= Lanfains =

Lanfains Lanfeun
- Commune
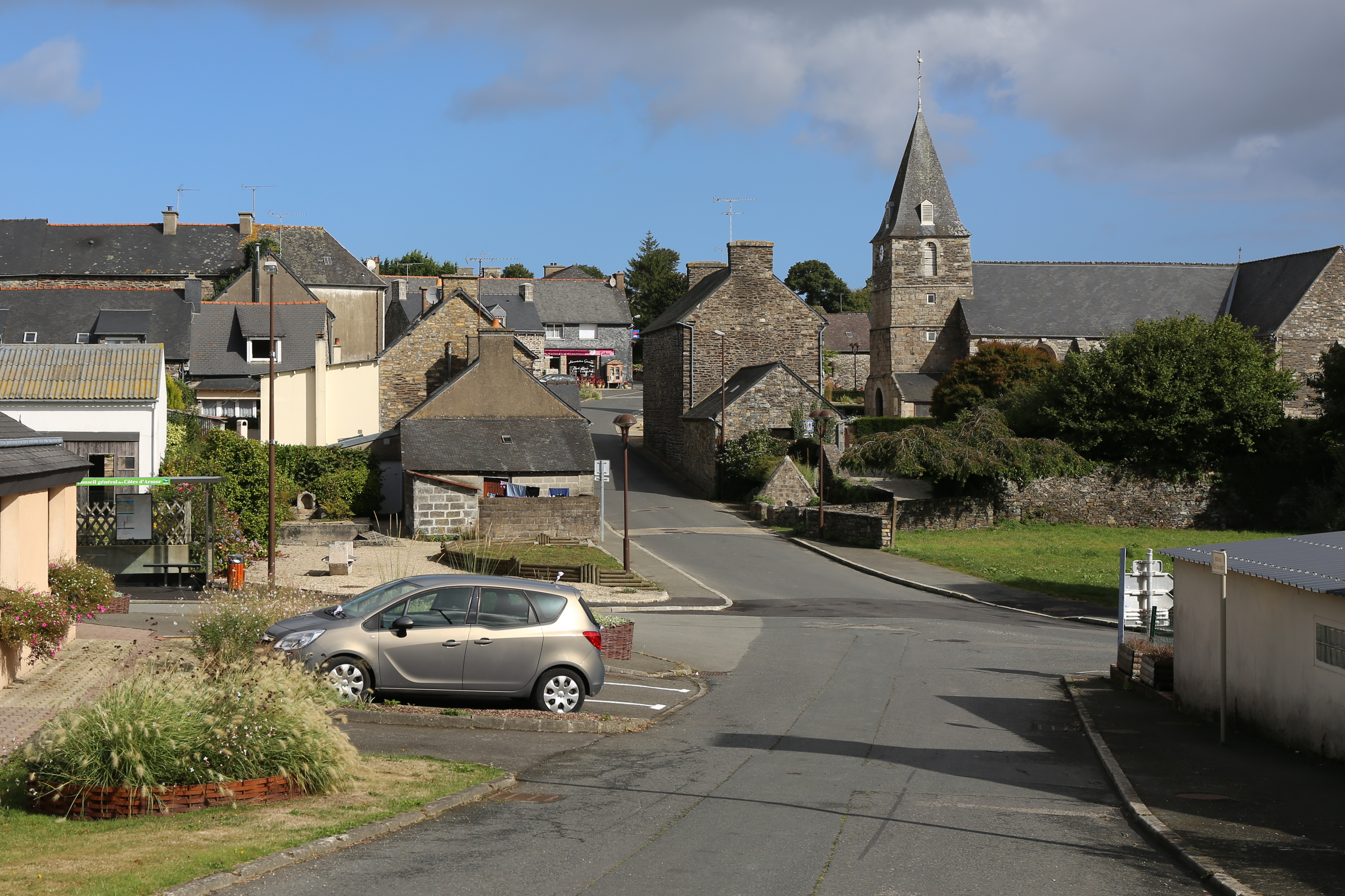
- The centre of Lanfains
- Location of Lanfains
- Location within France Location within Brittany
- Coordinates: 48°21′14″N 2°54′46″W
- Country: France
- Region: Brittany
- Department: Côtes-d'Armor
- Arrondissement: Saint-Brieuc
- Canton: Plélo
- Intercommunality: Saint-Brieuc Armor

Government
  - Mayor (2020–2026): Gérard Mérot
- Area^{1}: 21.87 km^{2} (8.44 sq mi)
- Highest elevation: 322 m (1,056 ft)
- Lowest elevation: 147 m (482 ft)
- Population (2023): 1,077
  - Density: 49.25/km^{2} (127.5/sq mi)
- Time zone: UTC+01:00 (CET)
  - Summer (DST): UTC+02:00 (CEST)
- INSEE/Postal code: 22099 /22800
- ^{1} French Land Register data, which excludes lakes, ponds, glaciers > 1 km^{2} (0.386 sq mi or 247 acres) and river estuaries.

Lanfains (French pronunciation: [lɑ̃fɛ̃]; Breton: Lanfeun) is a commune in the Côtes-d'Armor department of Brittany in northwestern France.

== Population ==
Historical population
Year	Pop.	±% p.a.
1968	978	—
1975	894	−1.27%
1982	796	−1.64%
1990	828	+0.49%
1999	868	+0.53%
2007	974	+1.45%
2012	1,055	+1.61%
2017	1,091	+0.67%
2023	1,077	−0.22%
Source: INSEE

Inhabitants of Lanfains are called lanfinois in French.

== Geography ==
The Lanfains countryside is bocage with undulating relief (Armorican Massif).

The highest point in the commune at 323 m is situated at Bel Air-Porpaire. This makes Lanfains one of the highest communes in Brittany, the church standing at an altitude of 310 m.

The neighbouring communes are Saint-Brandan, L'Hermitage-Lorge, Le Bodéo, La Harmoye, Saint-Bihy and Le Fœil. Quintin, Allineuc and Corlay are a few kilometres away.

== History ==
Lanfains' name comes from the Breton language "lann" (hermitage) and, it seems, from the Latin "fanum" (temple). Lanfains was situated at the border of the Gallo and Breton languages.

The parish of Lanfains was first mentioned in 1428.

A wind farm was installed in the commune in 2005.

== Economy ==
Agriculture is the main economic activity of the commune. It is essentially geared to husbandry of cattle, poultry and pigs and polyculture. The area of the commune is 2,187 hectares. Two food industry enterprises are present, the LDC abattoir and the Armoricaine dairy. Artisan work is represented by a roofer, a plumber, a sawmill, a fish farmer and a milk factory. There are several commercial firms in the commune including a café and bar, a crêperie, a garage, a public works firm and a poultry transporter.

== Sights ==
- Saint-Guyganton church - built 1717 and restored in 1845.
- Le Pas (with space for leisure, lake, camping and chapel, crossed by the Saint-Brieuc-Loudéac railway, the former foundry-forge of Le Pas which was active from 1828 to 1978)

== See also ==
- Communes of the Côtes-d'Armor department
