= Communes of the Côtes-d'Armor department =

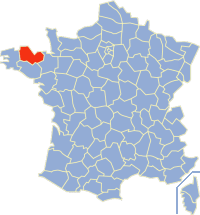

The following is a list of the 348 communes of the Côtes-d'Armor department of France.

The communes cooperate in the following intercommunalities (as of 2025):

- Communauté d'agglomération Dinan Agglomération
- Communauté d'agglomération Guingamp-Paimpol Agglomération
- Communauté d'agglomération Lamballe Terre et Mer
- Communauté d'agglomération Lannion-Trégor Communauté
- Communauté d'agglomération Saint-Brieuc Armor Agglomération
- Communauté de communes Côte d'Émeraude (partly)
- Communauté de communes du Kreiz-Breizh
- Communauté de communes Leff Armor Communauté
- Communauté de communes Loudéac Communauté − Bretagne Centre
- Communauté de communes Poher Communauté (partly)
- Communauté de communes Pontivy Communauté (partly)

INSEE code	Postal code	Commune
22001	22460	Allineuc
22002	22400	Andel
22003	22100	Aucaleuc
22209	22650	Beaussais-sur-Mer
22004	22140	Bégard
22005	22810	Belle-Isle-en-Terre
22006	22140	Berhet
22055	22680	Binic-Étables-sur-Mer
22008	22100	Bobital
22009	22320	Le Bodéo
22107	22570	Bon Repos sur Blavet
22011	22170	Boqueho
22012	22240	La Bouillie
22013	22390	Bourbriac
22014	22130	Bourseul
22015	22510	Bréhand
22018	22140	Brélidy
22019	22170	Bringolo
22020	22250	Broons
22021	22100	Brusvily
22023	22160	Bulat-Pestivien
22024	22160	Calanhel
22025	22160	Callac
22026	22100	Calorguen
22027	22210	Le Cambout
22028	22450	Camlez
22029	22480	Canihuel
22030	22300	Caouënnec-Lanvézéac
22031	22160	Carnoët
22032	22350	Caulnes
22033	22530	Caurel
22034	22140	Cavan
22035	22630	Les Champs-Géraux
22036	22350	La Chapelle-Blanche
22037	22160	La Chapelle-Neuve
22206	22170	Châtelaudren-Plouagat
22039	22210	La Chèze
22040	22970	Coadout
22041	22140	Coatascorn
22042	22450	Coatréven
22043	22210	Coëtlogon
22044	22400	Coëtmieux
22045	22800	Cohiniac
22047	22320	Corlay
22048	22130	Corseul
22049	22130	Créhen
22050	22100	Dinan
22052	22160	Duault
22053	22250	Éréac
22054	22430	Erquy
22056	22630	Évran
22057	22290	Le Faouët
22059	22800	Le Fœil
22179	22240	Fréhel
22060	22150	Gausson
22061	22110	Glomel
22062	22230	Gomené
22063	22290	Gommenec'h
22064	22570	Gouarec
22065	22290	Goudelin
22067	22200	Grâces
22068	22460	Grâce-Uzel
22069	22350	Guenroc
22158	22530	Guerlédan
22070	22200	Guingamp
22071	22350	Guitté
22072	22390	Gurunhuel
22073	22320	La Harmoye
22074	22320	Le Haut-Corlay
22075	22600	Hémonstoir
22076	22550	Hénanbihen
22077	22400	Hénansal
22079	22150	Hénon
22081	22120	Hillion
22082	22100	Le Hinglé
22016	22870	Île-de-Bréhat
22083	22230	Illifaut
22084	22270	Jugon-les-Lacs-Commune-Nouvelle
22085	22610	Kerbors
22086	22500	Kerfot
22087	22110	Kergrist-Moëlou
22088	22480	Kerien
22090	22450	Kermaria-Sulard
22091	22140	Kermoroc'h
22092	22480	Kerpert
22093	22400	Lamballe-Armor
22094	22770	Lancieux
22095	22140	Landebaëron
22096	22130	Landébia
22097	22980	La Landec
22098	22400	Landéhen
22099	22800	Lanfains
22101	22450	Langoat
22103	22490	Langrolay-sur-Rance
22104	22980	Languédias
22105	22130	Languenan
22106	22360	Langueux
22108	22290	Lanleff
22109	22580	Lanloup
22110	22300	Lanmérin
22111	22610	Lanmodez
22112	22290	Lannebert
22113	22300	Lannion
22114	22250	Lanrelas
22115	22480	Lanrivain
22116	22170	Lanrodec
22117	22410	Lantic
22118	22100	Lanvallay
22119	22420	Lanvellec
22121	22290	Lanvollon
22122	22230	Laurenan
22124	22570	Lescouët-Gouarec
22126	22800	Le Leslay
22127	22740	Lézardrieux
22128	22340	Locarn
22129	22810	Loc-Envel
22131	22780	Loguivy-Plougras
22132	22160	Lohuec
22133	22230	Loscouët-sur-Meu
22134	22700	Louannec
22135	22540	Louargat
22136	22600	Loudéac
22137	22340	Maël-Carhaix
22138	22160	Maël-Pestivien
22139	22480	Magoar
22140	22640	La Malhoure
22141	22450	Mantallot
22143	22550	Matignon
22144	22440	La Méaugon
22145	22270	Mégrit
22146	22110	Mellionnec
22046	22330	Le Mené
22147	22230	Merdrignac
22148	22230	Mérillac
22149	22460	Merléac
22150	22200	Le Merzer
22152	22220	Minihy-Tréguier
22153	22510	Moncontour
22155	22600	La Motte
22156	22200	Moustéru
22157	22340	Le Moustoir
22160	22400	Noyal
22161	22200	Pabu
22162	22500	Paimpol
22163	22340	Paule
22164	22540	Pédernec
22165	22510	Penguily
22166	22710	Penvénan
22168	22700	Perros-Guirec
22169	22480	Peumerit-Quintin
22170	22800	Plaine-Haute
22171	22940	Plaintel
22172	22130	Plancoët
22174	22550	Pléboulle
22175	22270	Plédéliac
22176	22960	Plédran
22177	22290	Pléguien
22178	22290	Pléhédel
22180	22980	Plélan-le-Petit
22181	22570	Plélauff
22182	22170	Plélo
22183	22210	Plémet
22184	22150	Plémy
22185	22640	Plénée-Jugon
22186	22370	Pléneuf-Val-André
22187	22190	Plérin
22188	22170	Plerneuf
22189	22720	Plésidy
22190	22490	Pleslin-Trigavou
22193	22640	Plestan
22194	22310	Plestin-les-Grèves
22195	22610	Pleubian

INSEE code	Postal code	Commune
22196	22740	Pleudaniel
22197	22690	Pleudihen-sur-Rance
22198	22560	Pleumeur-Bodou
22199	22740	Pleumeur-Gautier
22200	22130	Pléven
22201	22240	Plévenon
22202	22340	Plévin
22203	22150	Plœuc-l'Hermitage
22204	22260	Ploëzal
22205	22130	Plorec-sur-Arguenon
22207	22420	Plouaret
22208	22830	Plouasne
22210	22620	Ploubazlanec
22211	22300	Ploubezre
22212	22260	Plouëc-du-Trieux
22213	22490	Plouër-sur-Rance
22214	22470	Plouézec
22215	22440	Ploufragan
22216	22810	Plougonver
22217	22780	Plougras
22218	22820	Plougrescant
22219	22150	Plouguenast-Langast
22220	22110	Plouguernével
22221	22220	Plouguiel
22222	22580	Plouha
22223	22200	Plouisy
22224	22300	Ploulec'h
22225	22970	Ploumagoar
22226	22300	Ploumilliau
22227	22780	Plounérin
22228	22810	Plounévez-Moëdec
22229	22110	Plounévez-Quintin
22231	22160	Plourac'h
22232	22410	Plourhan
22233	22860	Plourivo
22234	22170	Plouvara
22235	22420	Plouzélambre
22236	22290	Pludual
22237	22130	Pluduno
22238	22310	Plufur
22239	22350	Plumaudan
22240	22250	Plumaugat
22241	22210	Plumieux
22242	22240	Plurien
22243	22160	Plusquellec
22244	22320	Plussulien
22245	22140	Pluzunet
22246	22120	Pommeret
22248	22200	Pommerit-le-Vicomte
22249	22390	Pont-Melvez
22250	22260	Pontrieux
22251	22590	Pordic
22254	22140	Prat
22255	22210	La Prénessaye
22256	22260	Quemper-Guézennec
22257	22450	Quemperven
22258	22120	Quessoy
22259	22100	Quévert
22260	22460	Le Quillio
22261	22400	Quintenic
22262	22800	Quintin
22263	22630	Le Quiou
22264	22450	La Roche-Jaudy
22265	22300	Rospez
22266	22110	Rostrenen
22267	22250	Rouillac
22268	22550	Ruca
22269	22260	Runan
22271	22390	Saint-Adrien
22272	22200	Saint-Agathon
22273	22400	Saint-Alban
22274	22630	Saint-André-des-Eaux
22275	22600	Saint-Barnabé
22276	22800	Saint-Bihy
22277	22800	Saint-Brandan
22278	22000	Saint-Brieuc
22279	22600	Saint-Caradec
22280	22100	Saint-Carné
22281	22150	Saint-Carreuc
22282	22380	Saint-Cast-le-Guildo
22283	22260	Saint-Clet
22284	22480	Saint-Connan
22285	22530	Saint-Connec
22286	22400	Saint-Denoual
22287	22800	Saint-Donan
22288	22210	Saint-Étienne-du-Gué-de-l'Isle
22331	22480	Sainte-Tréphine
22289	22720	Saint-Fiacre
22291	22800	Saint-Gildas
22293	22290	Saint-Gilles-les-Bois
22294	22480	Saint-Gilles-Pligeaux
22295	22530	Saint-Gilles-Vieux-Marché
22296	22510	Saint-Glen
22299	22100	Saint-Hélen
22300	22460	Saint-Hervé
22334	22570	Saint-Igeaux
22302	22750	Saint-Jacut-de-la-Mer
22304	22170	Saint-Jean-Kerdaniel
22305	22350	Saint-Jouan-de-l'Isle
22306	22630	Saint-Judoce
22307	22940	Saint-Julien
22308	22630	Saint-Juvat
22309	22230	Saint-Launeuc
22310	22140	Saint-Laurent
22311	22130	Saint-Lormel
22312	22350	Saint-Maden
22313	22320	Saint-Martin-des-Prés
22314	22600	Saint-Maudan
22315	22980	Saint-Maudez
22316	22320	Saint-Mayeux
22317	22980	Saint-Méloir-des-Bois
22318	22980	Saint-Michel-de-Plélan
22319	22300	Saint-Michel-en-Grève
22320	22160	Saint-Nicodème
22321	22480	Saint-Nicolas-du-Pélem
22322	22720	Saint-Péver
22323	22550	Saint-Pôtan
22324	22700	Saint-Quay-Perros
22325	22410	Saint-Quay-Portrieux
22326	22270	Saint-Rieul
22327	22100	Saint-Samson-sur-Rance
22328	22160	Saint-Servais
22330	22460	Saint-Thélo
22332	22510	Saint-Trimoël
22333	22230	Saint-Vran
22335	22720	Senven-Léhart
22337	22250	Sévignac
22338	22200	Squiffiec
22339	22100	Taden
22340	22140	Tonquédec
22341	22640	Tramain
22342	22980	Trébédan
22343	22560	Trébeurden
22344	22340	Trébrivan
22345	22510	Trébry
22346	22510	Trédaniel
22347	22220	Trédarzec
22348	22250	Trédias
22349	22300	Trédrez-Locquémeau
22350	22310	Tréduder
22351	22340	Treffrin
22352	22630	Tréfumel
22353	22730	Trégastel
22354	22540	Tréglamus
22356	22590	Trégomeur
22358	22200	Trégonneau
22359	22420	Trégrom
22360	22950	Trégueux
22361	22290	Tréguidel
22362	22220	Tréguier
22363	22660	Trélévern
22364	22100	Trélivan
22365	22110	Trémargat
22366	22310	Trémel
22368	22490	Tréméreuc
22369	22250	Trémeur
22370	22290	Tréméven
22371	22230	Trémorel
22372	22440	Trémuson
22373	22340	Tréogan
22375	22290	Tressignaux
22376	22600	Trévé
22377	22410	Tréveneuc
22378	22290	Trévérec
22379	22660	Trévou-Tréguignec
22380	22100	Trévron
22381	22450	Trézény
22383	22450	Troguéry
22384	22460	Uzel
22385	22690	La Vicomté-sur-Rance
22386	22800	Le Vieux-Bourg
22387	22420	Le Vieux-Marché
22388	22980	Vildé-Guingalan
22389	22120	Yffiniac
22390	22930	Yvias
22391	22350	Yvignac-la-Tour
