= Boqueho =

Boqueho Boskazoù
- Commune
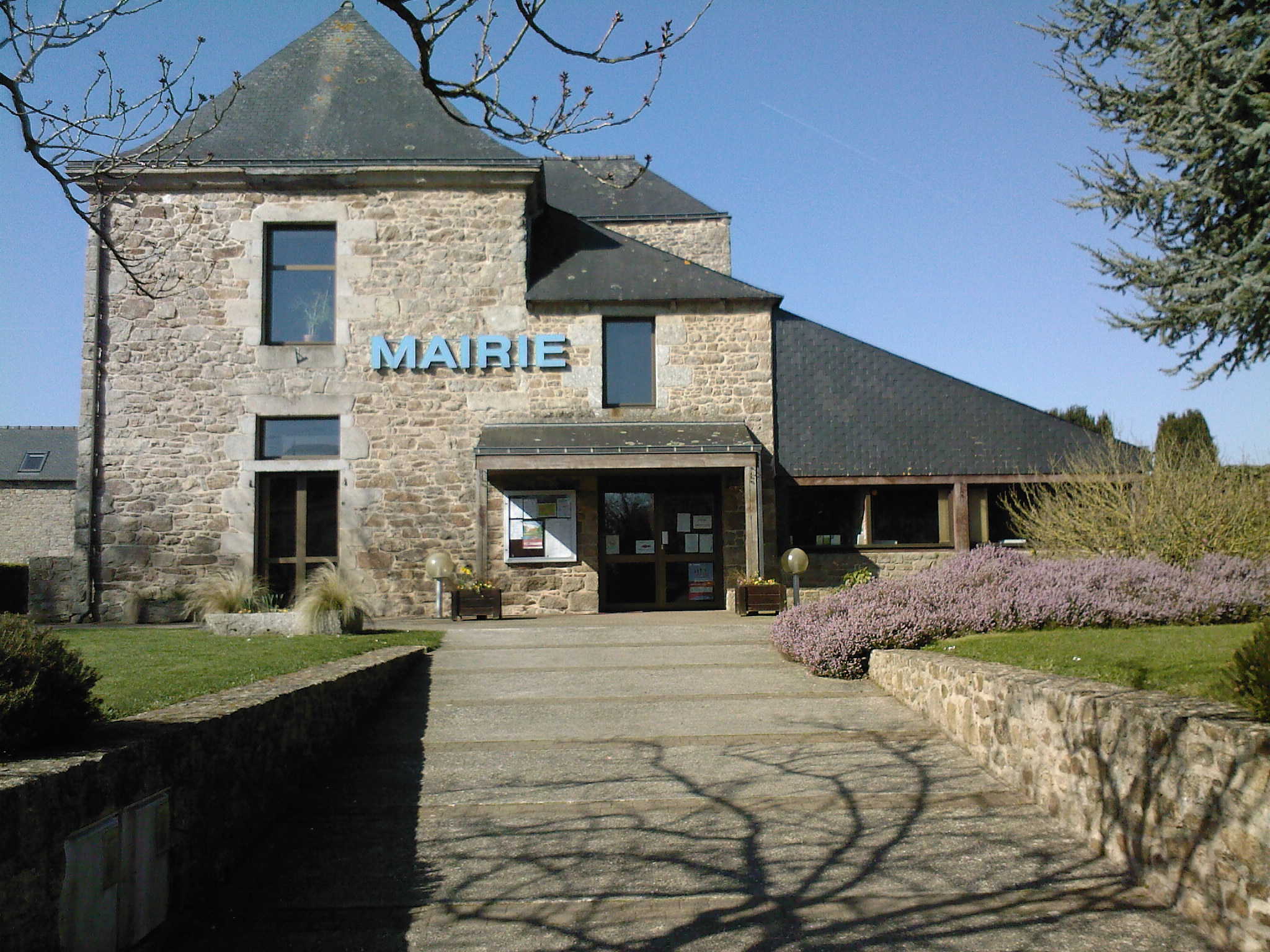
- Town hall
- Location of Boqueho
- Location within France Location within Brittany
- Coordinates: 48°29′02″N 2°57′36″W
- Country: France
- Region: Brittany
- Department: Côtes-d'Armor
- Arrondissement: Guingamp
- Canton: Plélo
- Intercommunality: Leff Armor Communauté

Government
  - Mayor (2020–2026): Nadia Le Hégarat
- Area^{1}: 27.12 km^{2} (10.47 sq mi)
- Highest elevation: 281 m (922 ft)
- Lowest elevation: 119 m (390 ft)
- Population (2023): 1,054
  - Density: 38.86/km^{2} (100.7/sq mi)
- Time zone: UTC+01:00 (CET)
  - Summer (DST): UTC+02:00 (CEST)
- INSEE/Postal code: 22011 /22170
- ^{1} French Land Register data, which excludes lakes, ponds, glaciers > 1 km^{2} (0.386 sq mi or 247 acres) and river estuaries.

Boqueho (French pronunciation: [bɔko] or [bɔkə.o]; Breton: Boskazoù; Gallo: Boco) is a commune in the Côtes-d'Armor department of Brittany in northwestern France.

== Population ==
Historical population
Year	Pop.	±% p.a.
1968	828	—
1975	755	−1.31%
1982	766	+0.21%
1990	791	+0.40%
1999	848	+0.78%
2007	983	+1.86%
2012	1,088	+2.05%
2017	1,078	−0.18%
2023	1,054	−0.37%
Source: INSEE

== See also ==
- Communes of the Côtes-d'Armor department
