= Saint-Péver =

Saint-Péver Sant-Pever
- Commune
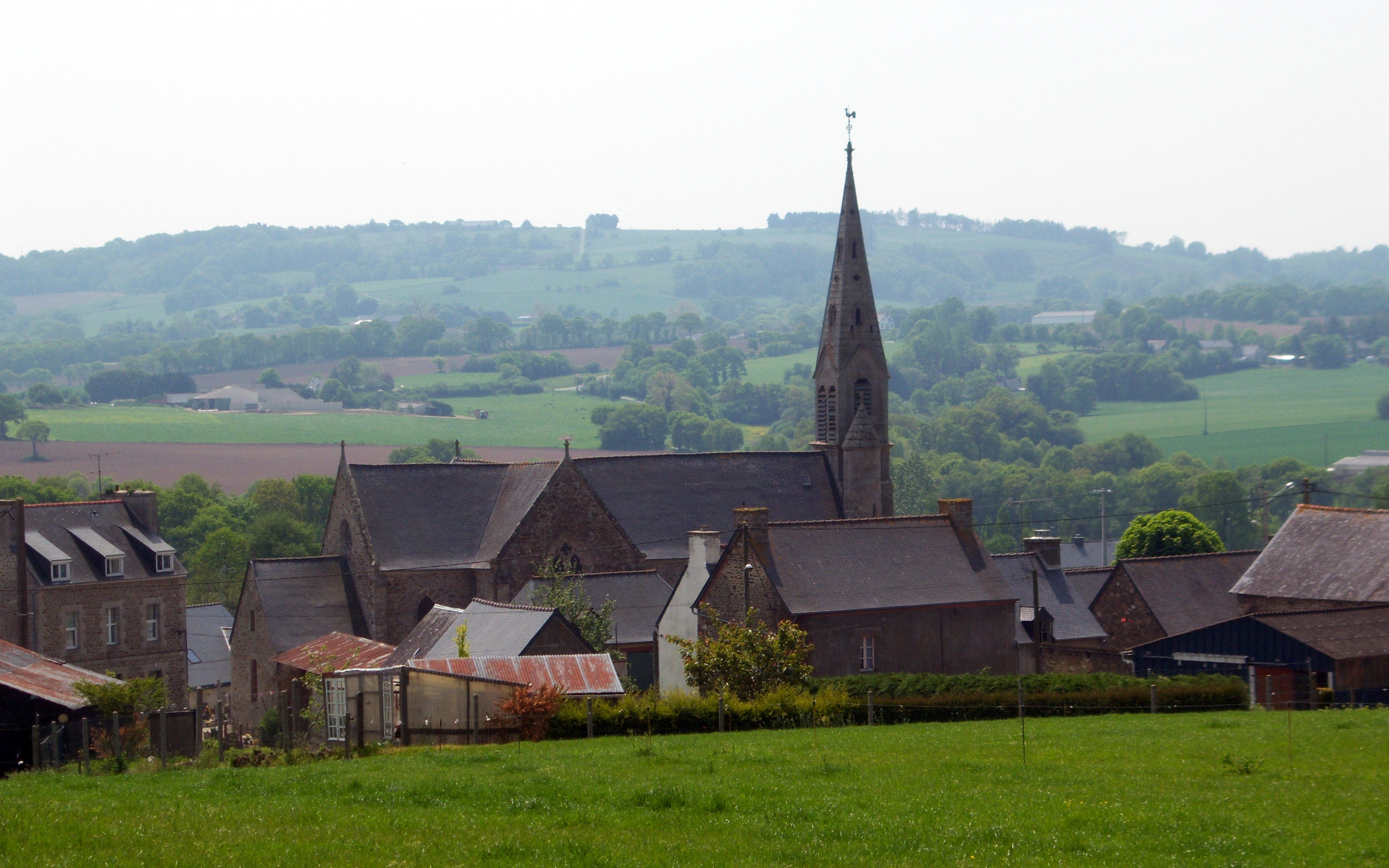
- The village of Saint-Péver
- Location of Saint-Péver
- Location within France Location within Brittany
- Coordinates: 48°28′55″N 3°06′02″W
- Country: France
- Region: Brittany
- Department: Côtes-d'Armor
- Arrondissement: Guingamp
- Canton: Plélo

Government
  - Mayor (2020–2026): Jean Jourden
- Area^{1}: 13.13 km^{2} (5.07 sq mi)
- Highest elevation: 203 m (666 ft)
- Lowest elevation: 89 m (292 ft)
- Population (2023): 397
  - Density: 30.2/km^{2} (78.3/sq mi)
- Time zone: UTC+01:00 (CET)
  - Summer (DST): UTC+02:00 (CEST)
- INSEE/Postal code: 22322 /22720
- ^{1} French Land Register data, which excludes lakes, ponds, glaciers > 1 km^{2} (0.386 sq mi or 247 acres) and river estuaries.

Saint-Péver (Breton: Sant-Pever) is a commune in the Côtes-d'Armor department of Brittany in northwestern France.

== Population ==
Historical population
Year	Pop.	±% p.a.
1968	358	—
1975	329	−1.20%
1982	303	−1.17%
1990	316	+0.53%
1999	328	+0.41%
2007	354	+0.96%
2012	389	+1.90%
2017	402	+0.66%
2023	397	−0.21%
Source: INSEE

== See also ==
- Communes of the Côtes-d'Armor department
