= Canton of Plélo =

Coordinates: 48.56°N 2.94°W

The canton of Plélo is an administrative division of the Côtes-d'Armor department, northwestern France. It was created at the French canton reorganisation which came into effect in March 2015. Its seat is in Plélo.

It consists of the following communes:

1. Boqueho
2. Bringolo
3. Châtelaudren-Plouagat
4. Cohiniac
5. Le Fœil
6. La Harmoye
7. Lanfains
8. Lanrodec
9. Le Leslay
10. Plaine-Haute
11. Plélo
12. Plerneuf
13. Plouvara
14. Quintin
15. Saint-Bihy
16. Saint-Brandan
17. Saint-Fiacre
18. Saint-Gildas
19. Saint-Jean-Kerdaniel
20. Saint-Péver
21. Trégomeur
22. Le Vieux-Bourg
