= Le Leslay =

Le Leslay Al Leslae
- Commune
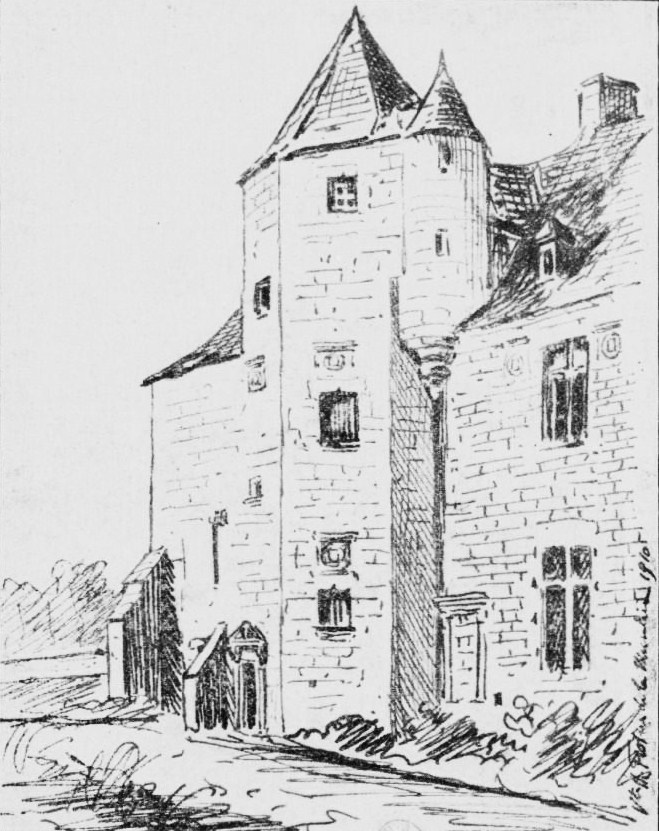
- The château of Beaumanoir
- Location of Le Leslay
- Location within France Location within Brittany
- Coordinates: 48°25′49″N 2°57′52″W
- Country: France
- Region: Brittany
- Department: Côtes-d'Armor
- Arrondissement: Saint-Brieuc
- Canton: Plélo
- Intercommunality: Saint-Brieuc Armor

Government
  - Mayor (2020–2026): Stéphane Ollivier
- Area^{1}: 5.01 km^{2} (1.93 sq mi)
- Highest elevation: 254 m (833 ft)
- Lowest elevation: 189 m (620 ft)
- Population (2023): 152
  - Density: 30.3/km^{2} (78.6/sq mi)
- Time zone: UTC+01:00 (CET)
  - Summer (DST): UTC+02:00 (CEST)
- INSEE/Postal code: 22126 /22800
- ^{1} French Land Register data, which excludes lakes, ponds, glaciers > 1 km^{2} (0.386 sq mi or 247 acres) and river estuaries.

Le Leslay (French pronunciation: [lə lɛlɛ]; Breton: Al Leslae) is a commune in the Côtes-d'Armor department of Brittany in northwestern France.

== Population ==
Historical population
Year	Pop.	±% p.a.
1968	134	—
1975	128	−0.65%
1982	118	−1.16%
1990	112	−0.65%
1999	113	+0.10%
2007	124	+1.17%
2012	145	+3.18%
2017	158	+1.73%
2023	152	−0.64%
Source: INSEE

Inhabitants of Le Leslay are called leslayens in French.

== See also ==
- Communes of the Côtes-d'Armor department
