= Saint-Donan =

Saint-Donan Sant-Donan
- Commune
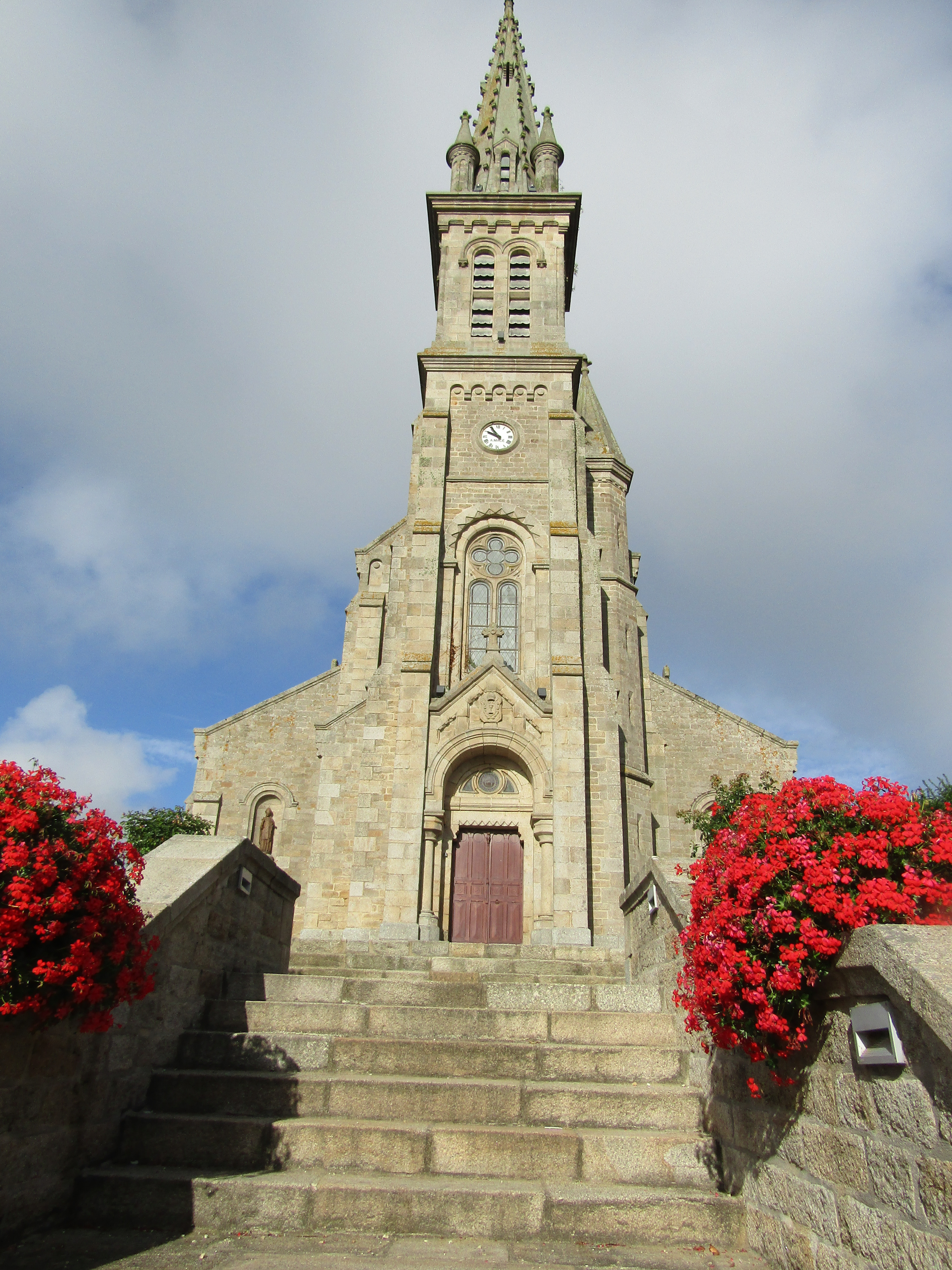
- The church in Saint-Donan
- Location of Saint-Donan
- Location within France Location within Brittany
- Coordinates: 48°28′14″N 2°53′01″W
- Country: France
- Region: Brittany
- Department: Côtes-d'Armor
- Arrondissement: Saint-Brieuc
- Canton: Ploufragan
- Intercommunality: Saint-Brieuc Armor

Government
  - Mayor (2020–2026): Michel Petra
- Area^{1}: 22.92 km^{2} (8.85 sq mi)
- Highest elevation: 227 m (745 ft)
- Lowest elevation: 87 m (285 ft)
- Population (2023): 1,477
  - Density: 64.44/km^{2} (166.9/sq mi)
- Time zone: UTC+01:00 (CET)
  - Summer (DST): UTC+02:00 (CEST)
- INSEE/Postal code: 22287 /22800
- ^{1} French Land Register data, which excludes lakes, ponds, glaciers > 1 km^{2} (0.386 sq mi or 247 acres) and river estuaries.

Saint-Donan (French pronunciation: [sɛ̃ dɔnɑ̃]; Breton: Sant-Donan) is a commune in the Côtes-d'Armor department of Brittany in northwestern France.

== Population ==
Historical population
Year	Pop.	±% p.a.
1968	863	—
1975	864	+0.02%
1982	1,074	+3.16%
1990	1,278	+2.20%
1999	1,347	+0.59%
2007	1,419	+0.65%
2012	1,462	+0.60%
2017	1,457	−0.07%
2023	1,477	+0.23%
Source: INSEE

Inhabitants of Saint-Donan are called donanais in French.

== See also ==
- Communes of the Côtes-d'Armor department
