= Plélo =

Plélo Pleuloc'h
- Commune
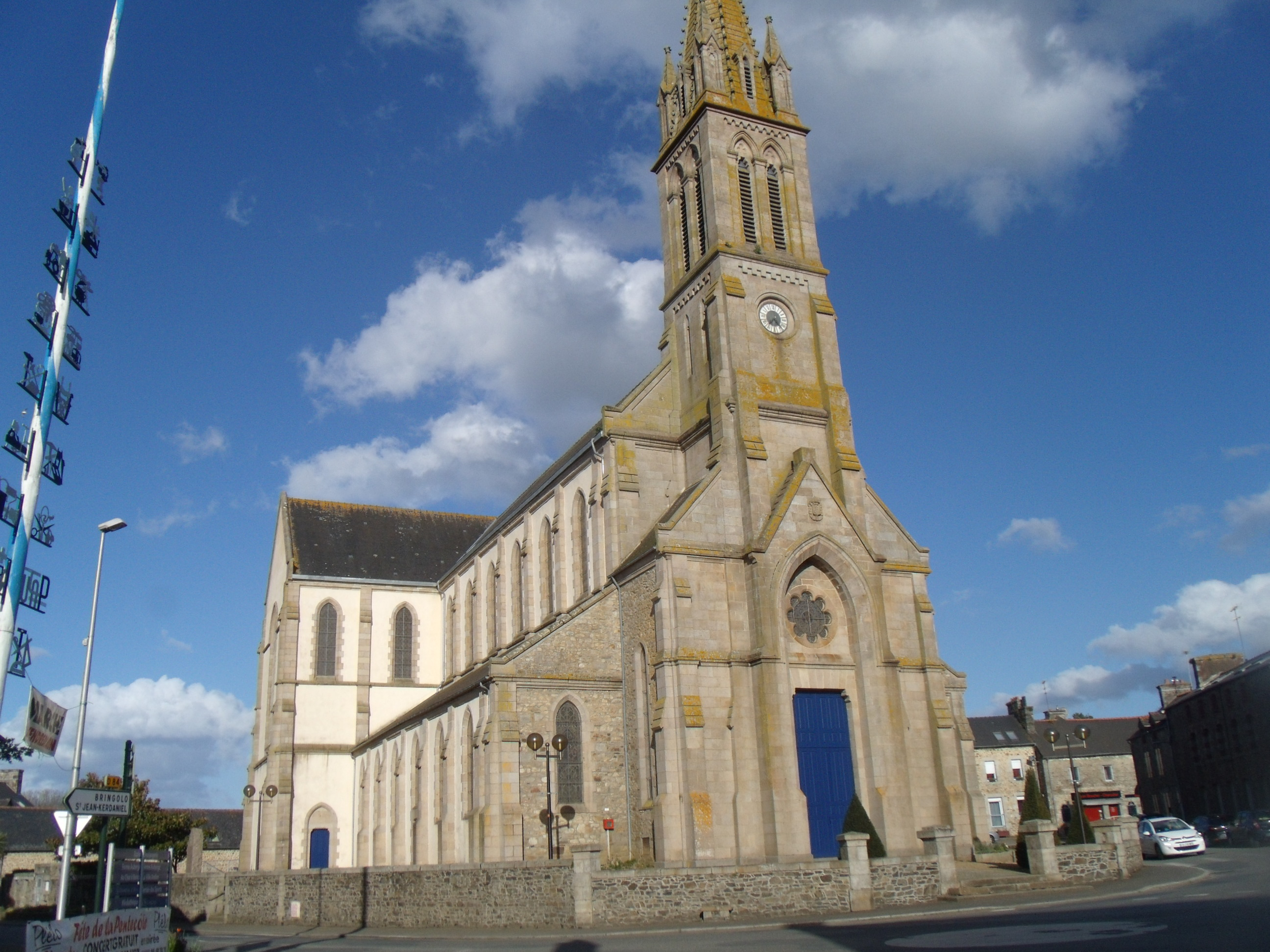
- The church of Saint-Pierre and Saint-Paul, in Plélo

- Coat of arms
- Location of Plélo
- Location within France Location within Brittany
- Coordinates: 48°33′26″N 2°56′44″W
- Country: France
- Region: Brittany
- Department: Côtes-d'Armor
- Arrondissement: Guingamp
- Canton: Plélo
- Intercommunality: Leff Armor Communauté

Government
  - Mayor (2020–2026): Jérémy Meuro
- Area^{1}: 43.38 km^{2} (16.75 sq mi)
- Highest elevation: 175 m (574 ft)
- Lowest elevation: 44 m (144 ft)
- Population (2023): 3,344
  - Density: 77.09/km^{2} (199.7/sq mi)
- Time zone: UTC+01:00 (CET)
  - Summer (DST): UTC+02:00 (CEST)
- INSEE/Postal code: 22182 /22170
- ^{1} French Land Register data, which excludes lakes, ponds, glaciers > 1 km^{2} (0.386 sq mi or 247 acres) and river estuaries.

Plélo (French pronunciation: [plelo]; Breton: Pleuloc'h; Gallo: Pléloc) is a commune in the Côtes-d'Armor department of Brittany in northwestern France.

== Population ==
Inhabitants of Plélo are called plélotins in French.

Historical population
Year	Pop.	±% p.a.
1968	2,084	—
1975	2,033	−0.35%
1982	2,177	+0.98%
1990	2,359	+1.01%
1999	2,631	+1.22%
2007	3,169	+2.35%
2012	3,289	+0.75%
2017	3,289	+0.00%
2023	3,344	+0.28%
Source: INSEE

== See also ==
- Communes of the Côtes-d'Armor department
