= Plerneuf =

Plerneuf Plerneg
- Commune
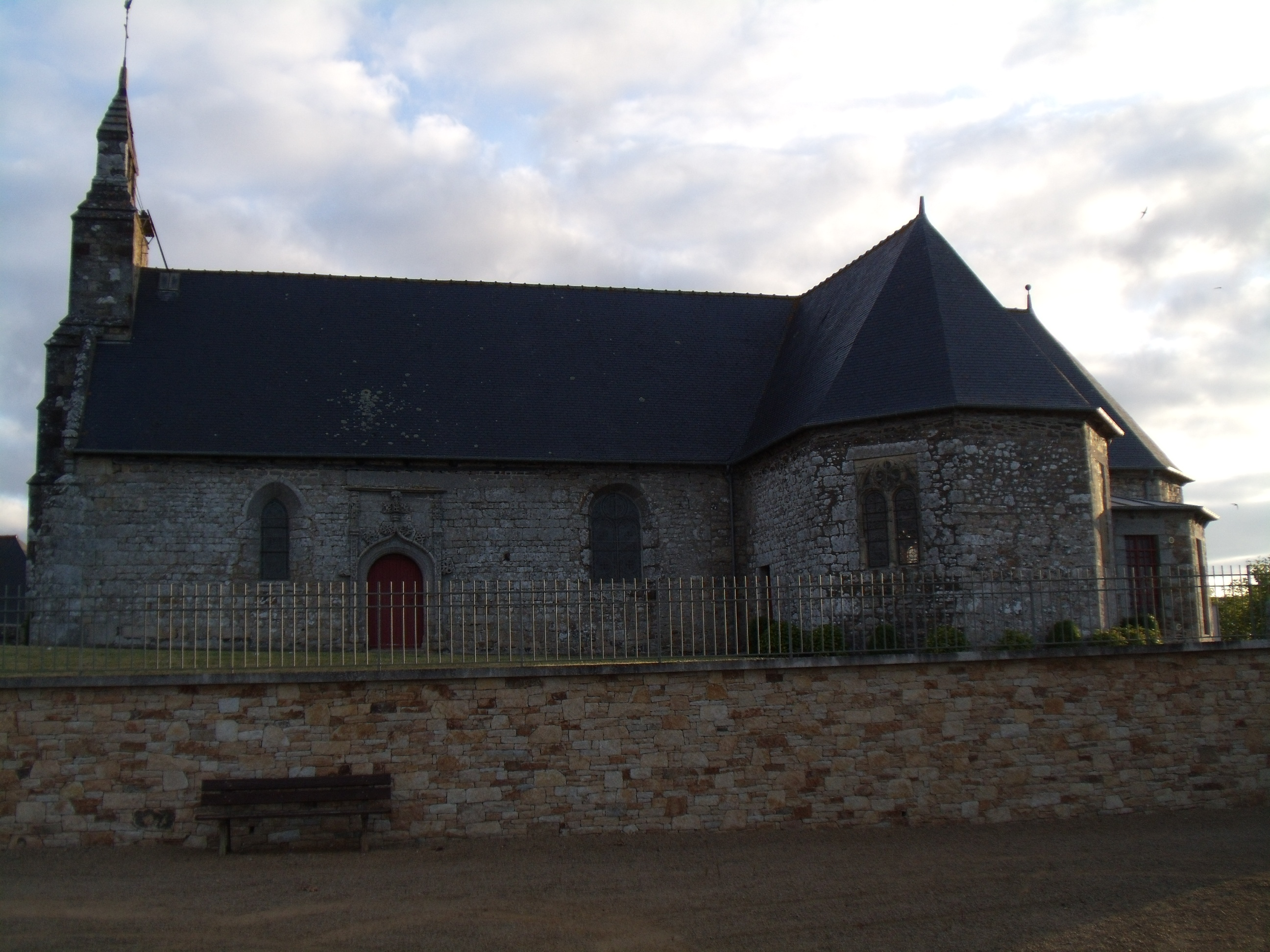
- The church of Saint-Pierre and Saint-Paul, in Plerneuf
- Location of Plerneuf
- Location within France Location within Brittany
- Coordinates: 48°30′55″N 2°53′01″W
- Country: France
- Region: Brittany
- Department: Côtes-d'Armor
- Arrondissement: Guingamp
- Canton: Plélo
- Intercommunality: Leff Armor Communauté

Government
  - Mayor (2020–2026): Philippe Le Méhauté
- Area^{1}: 8.30 km^{2} (3.20 sq mi)
- Highest elevation: 208 m (682 ft)
- Lowest elevation: 118 m (387 ft)
- Population (2023): 1,123
  - Density: 135/km^{2} (350/sq mi)
- Time zone: UTC+01:00 (CET)
  - Summer (DST): UTC+02:00 (CEST)
- INSEE/Postal code: 22188 /22170
- ^{1} French Land Register data, which excludes lakes, ponds, glaciers > 1 km^{2} (0.386 sq mi or 247 acres) and river estuaries.

Plerneuf (French pronunciation: [plɛʁnœf]; Breton: Plerneg; Gallo: Plèrnoec) is a commune in the Côtes-d'Armor department of Brittany in northwestern France.

== Population ==
Historical population
Year	Pop.	±% p.a.
1968	425	—
1975	545	+3.62%
1982	755	+4.77%
1990	844	+1.40%
1999	886	+0.54%
2007	1,019	+1.76%
2012	1,002	−0.34%
2017	1,053	+1.00%
2023	1,123	+1.08%
Source: INSEE

Inhabitants of Plerneuf are called plerneucois in French.

== See also ==
- Communes of the Côtes-d'Armor department
