= Saint-Jean-Kerdaniel =

Saint-Jean-Kerdaniel Sant-Yann-Gerdaniel
- Commune
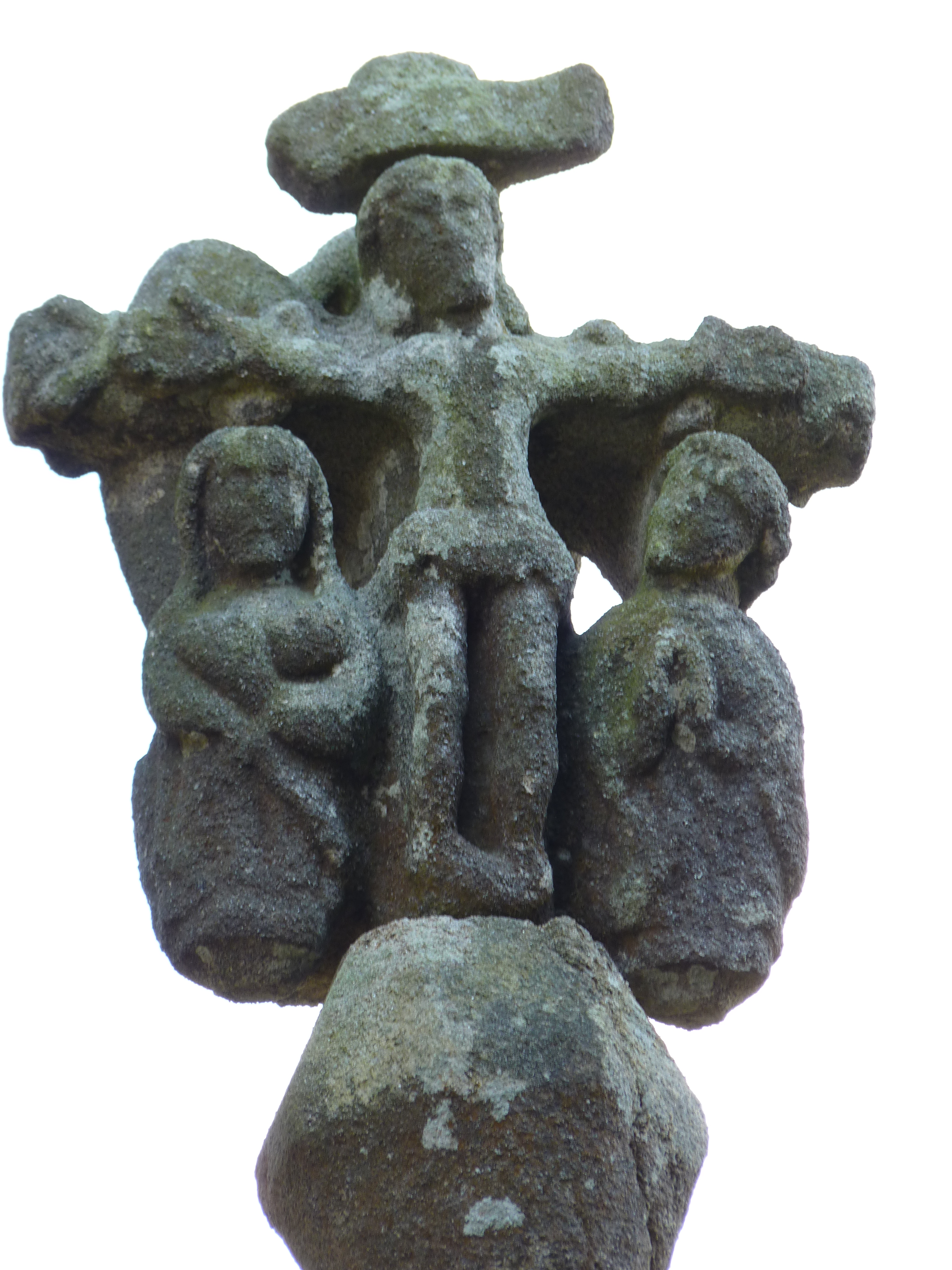
- The cross of Kerfontan, in Saint-Jean-Kerdaniel
- Location of Saint-Jean-Kerdaniel
- Location within France Location within Brittany
- Coordinates: 48°33′57″N 3°01′12″W
- Country: France
- Region: Brittany
- Department: Côtes-d'Armor
- Arrondissement: Guingamp
- Canton: Plélo

Government
  - Mayor (2020–2026): Jean-Baptiste Le Verre
- Area^{1}: 11.12 km^{2} (4.29 sq mi)
- Highest elevation: 174 m (571 ft)
- Lowest elevation: 102 m (335 ft)
- Population (2023): 694
  - Density: 62.4/km^{2} (162/sq mi)
- Time zone: UTC+01:00 (CET)
  - Summer (DST): UTC+02:00 (CEST)
- INSEE/Postal code: 22304 /22170
- ^{1} French Land Register data, which excludes lakes, ponds, glaciers > 1 km^{2} (0.386 sq mi or 247 acres) and river estuaries.

Saint-Jean-Kerdaniel (French pronunciation: [sɛ̃ ʒɑ̃ kɛʁdanjɛl]; Breton: Sant-Yann-Gerdaniel) is a commune in the Côtes-d'Armor département of Brittany in northwestern France.

== Population ==
Historical population
| Year | Pop. | ±% p.a. |
|---|---|---|
| 1968 | 379 | — |
| 1975 | 303 | −3.15% |
| 1982 | 289 | −0.67% |
| 1990 | 373 | +3.24% |
| 1999 | 461 | +2.38% |
| 2007 | 544 | +2.09% |
| 2012 | 586 | +1.50% |
| 2017 | 637 | +1.68% |
| 2023 | 694 | +1.44% |
Source: INSEE

Inhabitants of Saint-Jean-Kerdaniel are called kerdanielais in French.

== See also ==
- Communes of the Côtes-d'Armor department
