= Tréveneuc =

Tréveneuc Treveneg
- Commune
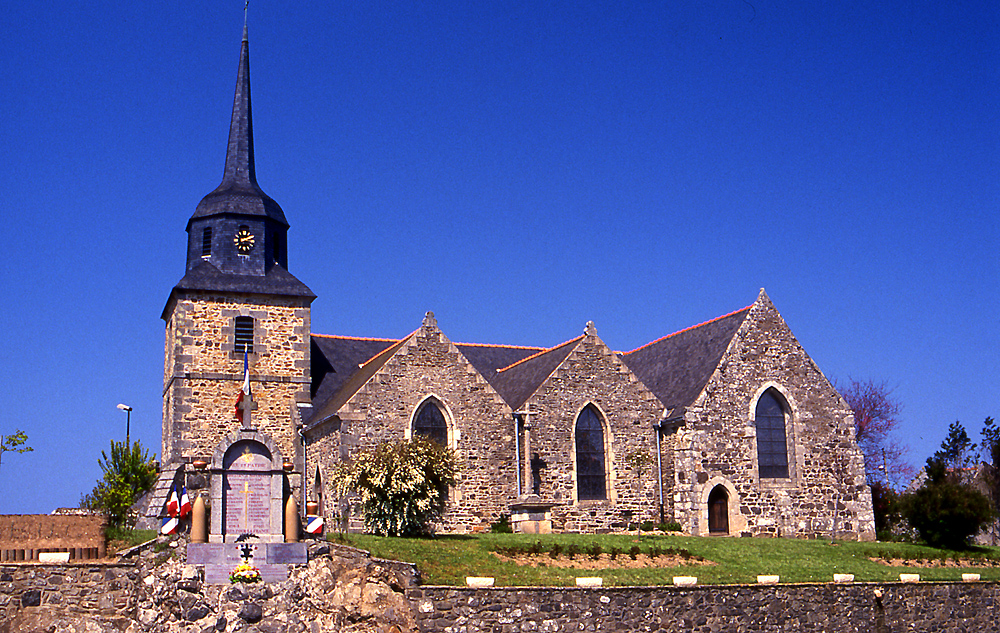
- The church of Tréveneuc

- Flag Coat of arms
- Location of Tréveneuc
- Location within France Location within Brittany
- Coordinates: 48°39′52″N 2°52′08″W
- Country: France
- Region: Brittany
- Department: Côtes-d'Armor
- Arrondissement: Saint-Brieuc
- Canton: Plouha
- Intercommunality: Saint-Brieuc Armor

Government
  - Mayor (2020–2026): Marcel Sérandour
- Area^{1}: 6.65 km^{2} (2.57 sq mi)
- Highest elevation: 87 m (285 ft)
- Lowest elevation: 0 m (0 ft)
- Population (2023): 813
  - Density: 122/km^{2} (317/sq mi)
- Time zone: UTC+01:00 (CET)
  - Summer (DST): UTC+02:00 (CEST)
- INSEE/Postal code: 22377 /22410
- ^{1} French Land Register data, which excludes lakes, ponds, glaciers > 1 km^{2} (0.386 sq mi or 247 acres) and river estuaries.

Tréveneuc (French pronunciation: [tʁevnœk]; Breton: Treveneg) is a commune in the Côtes-d'Armor department of Brittany in northwestern France.

== Population ==
Historical population
Year	Pop.	±% p.a.
1968	546	—
1975	553	+0.18%
1982	599	+1.15%
1990	607	+0.17%
1999	593	−0.26%
2007	759	+3.13%
2012	772	+0.34%
2017	794	+0.56%
2023	813	+0.39%
Source: INSEE

Inhabitants of Tréveneuc are called tréveneucois in French.

== See also ==
- Communes of the Côtes-d'Armor department
