= Lanrodec =

Lanrodec Lanrodeg
- Commune
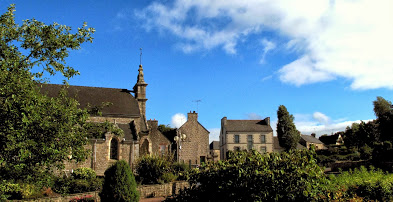
- The Rue des Écoliers in Lanrodec
- Location of Lanrodec
- Location within France Location within Brittany
- Coordinates: 48°31′01″N 3°01′47″W
- Country: France
- Region: Brittany
- Department: Côtes-d'Armor
- Arrondissement: Guingamp
- Canton: Plélo

Government
  - Mayor (2024–2026): Alain Ollivier-Henry
- Area^{1}: 31.92 km^{2} (12.32 sq mi)
- Highest elevation: 208 m (682 ft)
- Lowest elevation: 132 m (433 ft)
- Population (2023): 1,387
  - Density: 43.45/km^{2} (112.5/sq mi)
- Time zone: UTC+01:00 (CET)
  - Summer (DST): UTC+02:00 (CEST)
- INSEE/Postal code: 22116 /22170
- ^{1} French Land Register data, which excludes lakes, ponds, glaciers > 1 km^{2} (0.386 sq mi or 247 acres) and river estuaries.

Lanrodec (French pronunciation: [lɑ̃ʁɔdɛk]; Breton: Lanrodeg) is a commune in the Côtes-d'Armor department of Brittany in northwestern France.

== Population ==
Historical population
Year	Pop.	±% p.a.
1968	844	—
1975	724	−2.17%
1982	785	+1.16%
1990	801	+0.25%
1999	843	+0.57%
2007	1,001	+2.17%
2012	1,220	+4.04%
2017	1,327	+1.70%
2023	1,387	+0.74%
Source: INSEE

Inhabitants of Lanrodec are called lanrodéciens in French.

== See also ==
- Communes of the Côtes-d'Armor department
