= Plourhan =

Plourhan Plourc'han (Breton)
- Commune
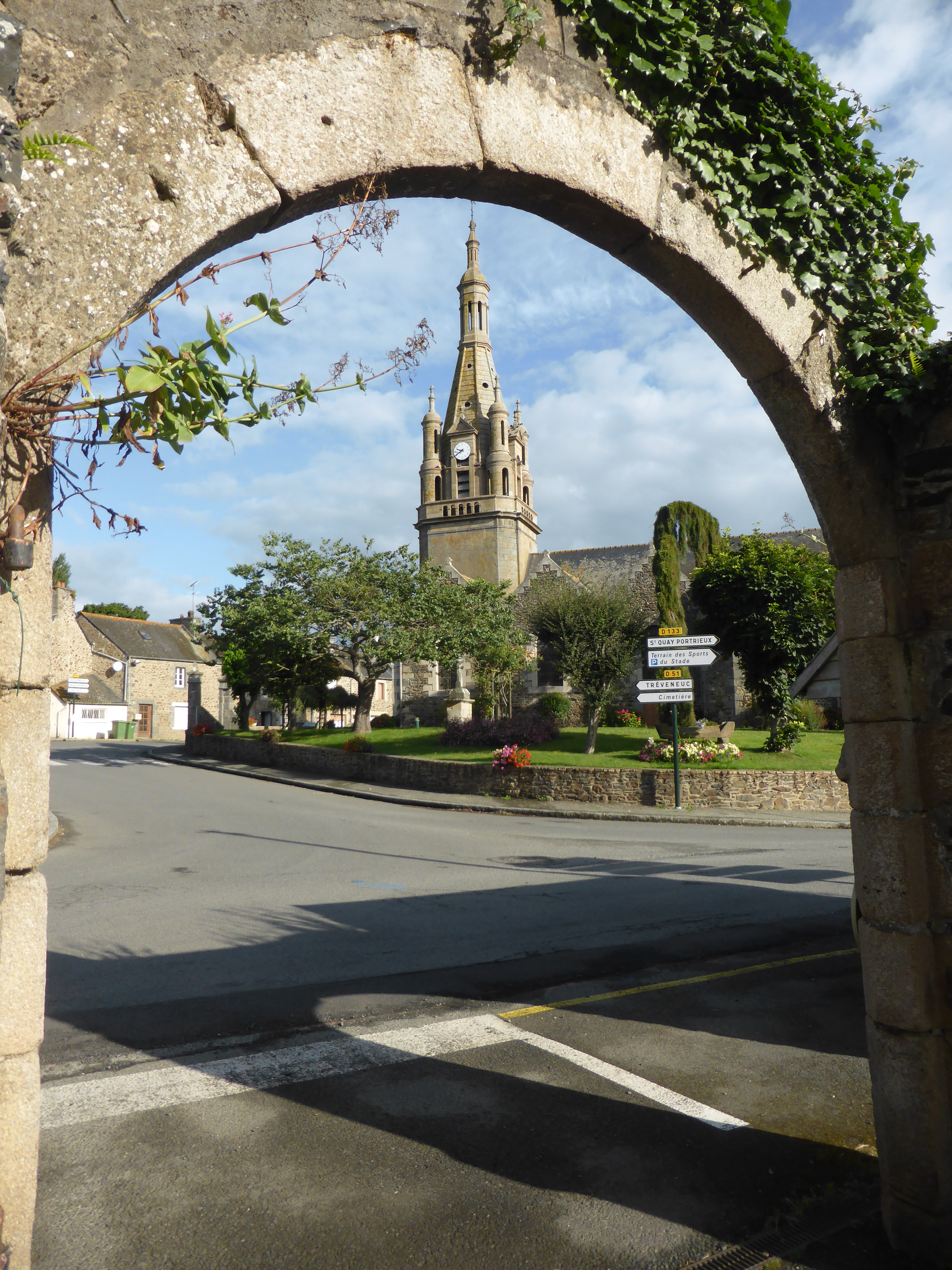
- The church of Saint-Pierre, seen from near the town hall

- Coat of arms
- Location of Plourhan
- Location within France Location within Brittany
- Coordinates: 48°37′53″N 2°52′13″W
- Country: France
- Region: Brittany
- Department: Côtes-d'Armor
- Arrondissement: Saint-Brieuc
- Canton: Plouha
- Intercommunality: Saint-Brieuc Armor

Government
  - Mayor (2020–2026): Loïc Raoult
- Area^{1}: 17.24 km^{2} (6.66 sq mi)
- Highest elevation: 111 m (364 ft)
- Lowest elevation: 21 m (69 ft)
- Population (2023): 2,155
  - Density: 125.0/km^{2} (323.7/sq mi)
- Time zone: UTC+01:00 (CET)
  - Summer (DST): UTC+02:00 (CEST)
- INSEE/Postal code: 22232 /22410
- ^{1} French Land Register data, which excludes lakes, ponds, glaciers > 1 km^{2} (0.386 sq mi or 247 acres) and river estuaries.

Plourhan (French pronunciation: [pluʁɑ̃]; Breton: Plourc'han) is a commune in the Côtes-d'Armor department of Brittany in northwestern France.

== Population ==
Inhabitants of Plourhan are called plourhannais in French.

Historical population
Year	Pop.	±% p.a.
1968	1,164	—
1975	1,157	−0.09%
1982	1,189	+0.39%
1990	1,326	+1.37%
1999	1,549	+1.74%
2007	1,912	+2.67%
2012	1,968	+0.58%
2017	1,996	+0.28%
2023	2,155	+1.29%
Source: INSEE

== See also ==
- Communes of the Côtes-d'Armor department
