= Saint-Carreuc =

Saint-Carreuc Sant-Kareg
- Commune
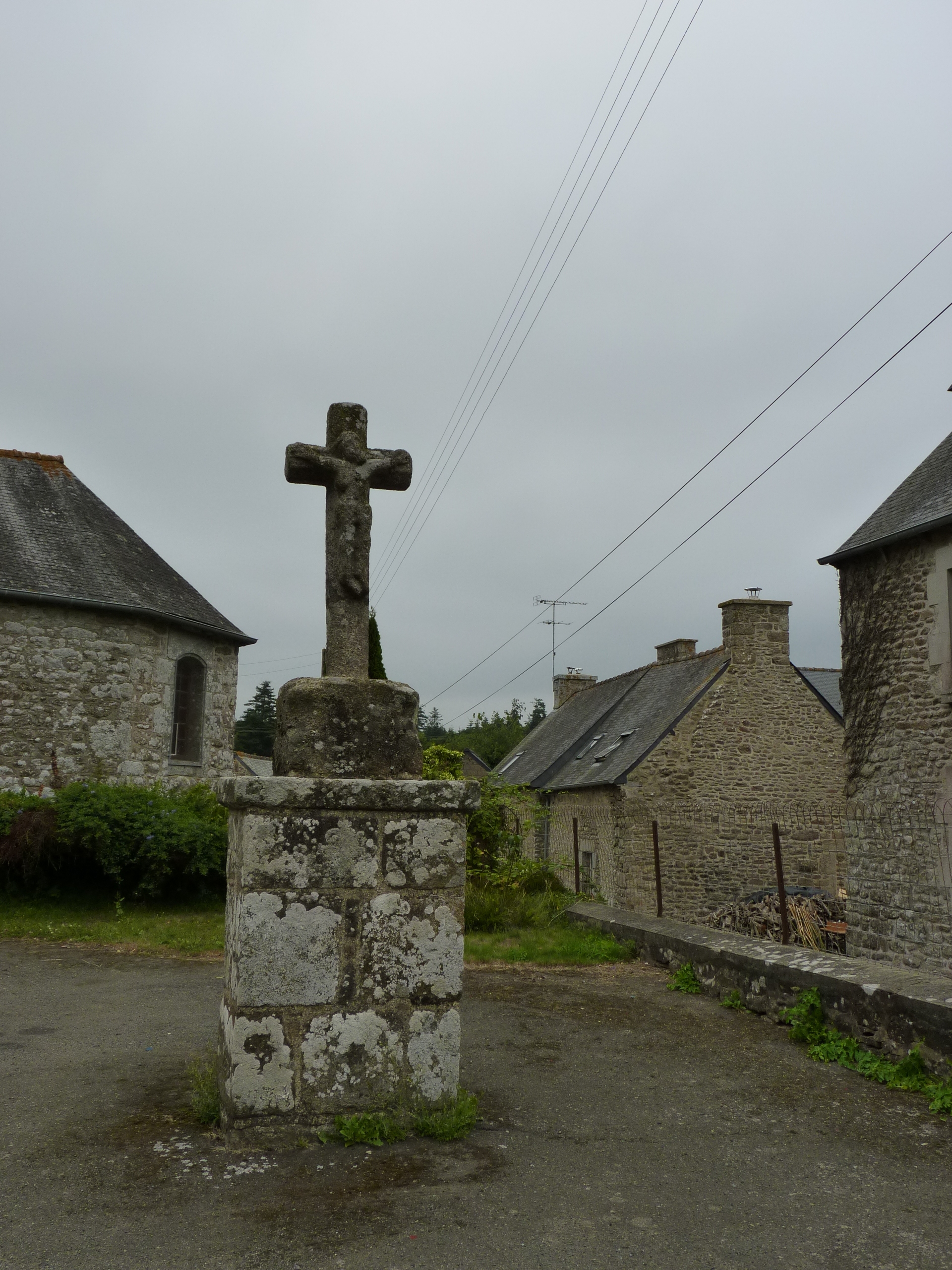
- The cross of Saint-Guéhen, in Saint-Carreuc
- Location of Saint-Carreuc
- Location within France Location within Brittany
- Coordinates: 48°23′57″N 2°43′49″W
- Country: France
- Region: Brittany
- Department: Côtes-d'Armor
- Arrondissement: Saint-Brieuc
- Canton: Plaintel
- Intercommunality: Saint-Brieuc Armor

Government
  - Mayor (2020–2026): Laurence Mahé
- Area^{1}: 12.69 km^{2} (4.90 sq mi)
- Highest elevation: 237 m (778 ft)
- Lowest elevation: 125 m (410 ft)
- Population (2023): 1,576
  - Density: 124.2/km^{2} (321.7/sq mi)
- Time zone: UTC+01:00 (CET)
  - Summer (DST): UTC+02:00 (CEST)
- INSEE/Postal code: 22281 /22150
- ^{1} French Land Register data, which excludes lakes, ponds, glaciers > 1 km^{2} (0.386 sq mi or 247 acres) and river estuaries.

Saint-Carreuc (French pronunciation: [sɛ̃ kaʁœk]; Gallo: Saent-Caroec) is a commune in the Côtes-d'Armor department of Brittany in northwestern France.

== Population ==
Historical population
Year	Pop.	±% p.a.
1968	917	—
1975	859	−0.93%
1982	1,072	+3.22%
1990	1,217	+1.60%
1999	1,227	+0.09%
2007	1,449	+2.10%
2012	1,498	+0.67%
2017	1,509	+0.15%
2023	1,576	+0.73%
Source: INSEE

Inhabitants of Saint-Carreuc are called carreucois in French.

== See also ==
- Communes of the Côtes-d'Armor department
