= Plaine-Haute =

Plaine-Haute Plenaod
- Commune
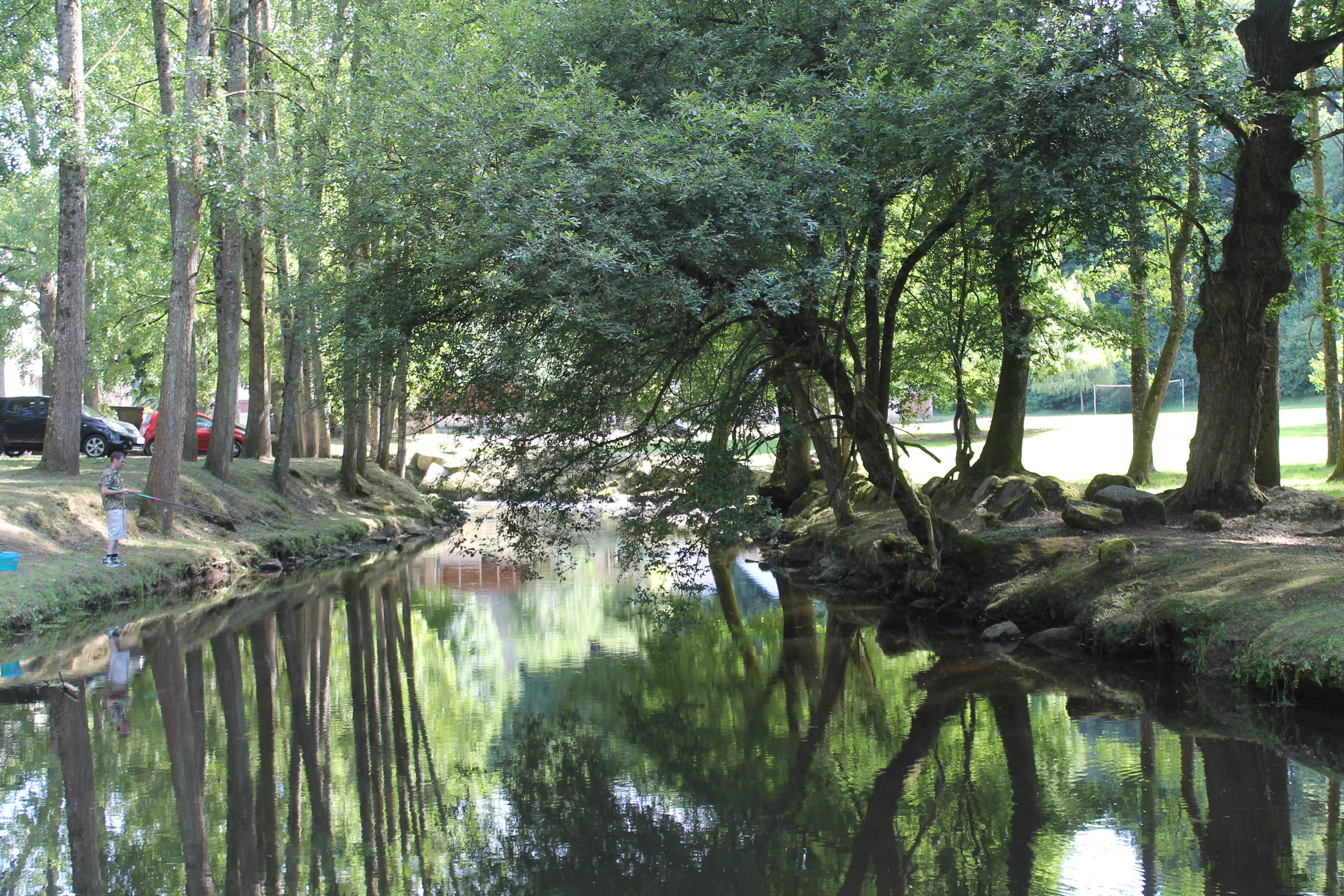
- The Gouët river, in Sainte-Anne-du-Houlin
- Location of Plaine-Haute
- Location within France Location within Brittany
- Coordinates: 48°26′46″N 2°51′09″W
- Country: France
- Region: Brittany
- Department: Côtes-d'Armor
- Arrondissement: Saint-Brieuc
- Canton: Plélo
- Intercommunality: Saint-Brieuc Armor

Government
  - Mayor (2020–2026): Philippe Pierre
- Area^{1}: 15.29 km^{2} (5.90 sq mi)
- Highest elevation: 199 m (653 ft)
- Lowest elevation: 87 m (285 ft)
- Population (2023): 1,712
  - Density: 112.0/km^{2} (290.0/sq mi)
- Time zone: UTC+01:00 (CET)
  - Summer (DST): UTC+02:00 (CEST)
- INSEE/Postal code: 22170 /22800
- ^{1} French Land Register data, which excludes lakes, ponds, glaciers > 1 km^{2} (0.386 sq mi or 247 acres) and river estuaries.

Plaine-Haute (French pronunciation: [plɛn ot]; Breton: Plenaod; Gallo: Plenautt) is a commune in the Côtes-d'Armor department of Brittany in northwestern France. It has economic links to nearby Dinard.

== Population ==
Historical population
Year	Pop.	±% p.a.
1968	918	—
1975	1,025	+1.59%
1982	1,102	+1.04%
1990	1,117	+0.17%
1999	1,211	+0.90%
2007	1,254	+0.44%
2012	1,485	+3.44%
2017	1,604	+1.55%
2023	1,712	+1.09%
Source: INSEE

Inhabitants of Plaine-Haute are called plénaltais in French.

== See also ==
- Communes of the Côtes-d'Armor department
