= Saint-Gildas =

Saint-Gildas Sant-Weltaz
- Commune
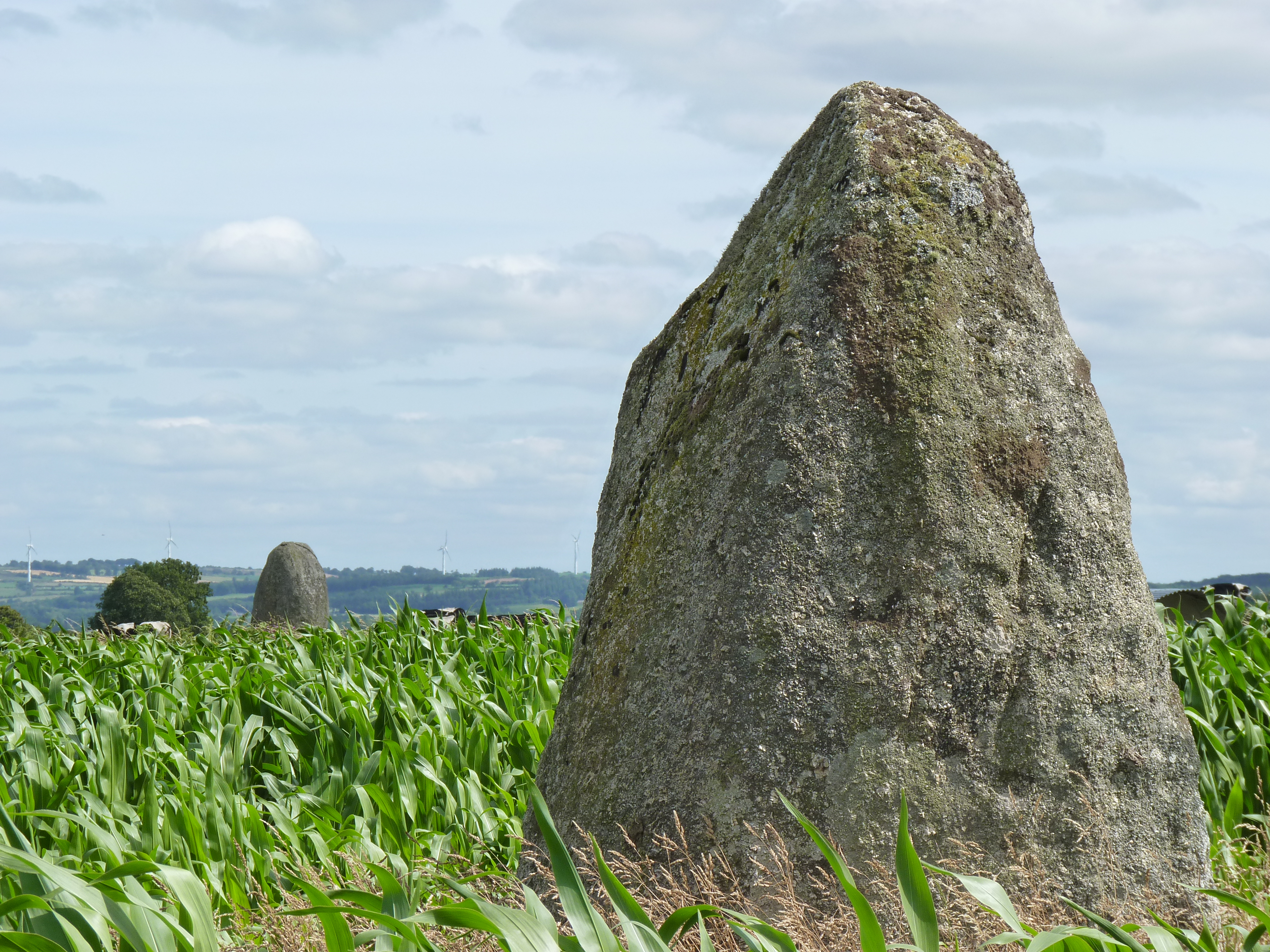
- The menhir of Keranhouët, in Saint-Gildas
- Location of Saint-Gildas
- Location within France Location within Brittany
- Coordinates: 48°25′23″N 3°00′07″W
- Country: France
- Region: Brittany
- Department: Côtes-d'Armor
- Arrondissement: Saint-Brieuc
- Canton: Plélo
- Intercommunality: Saint-Brieuc Armor

Government
  - Mayor (2020–2026): Annie Simon
- Area^{1}: 15.54 km^{2} (6.00 sq mi)
- Highest elevation: 286 m (938 ft)
- Lowest elevation: 195 m (640 ft)
- Population (2023): 248
  - Density: 16.0/km^{2} (41.3/sq mi)
- Time zone: UTC+01:00 (CET)
  - Summer (DST): UTC+02:00 (CEST)
- INSEE/Postal code: 22291 /22800
- ^{1} French Land Register data, which excludes lakes, ponds, glaciers > 1 km^{2} (0.386 sq mi or 247 acres) and river estuaries.

Saint-Gildas (Breton: Sant-Weltaz) is a commune in the Côtes-d'Armor department of Brittany in northwestern France.

== Population ==
Historical population
Year	Pop.	±% p.a.
1968	409	—
1975	351	−2.16%
1982	330	−0.88%
1990	277	−2.16%
1999	257	−0.83%
2007	265	+0.38%
2012	299	+2.44%
2017	269	−2.09%
2023	248	−1.35%
Source: INSEE

Inhabitants of Saint-Gildas are called Gildasiens and Gildasiennes in French.

== In legend and fiction ==
Breton legend connects Gildas with Brittany. The first book by the Irish writer Julia Kavanagh, Saint-Gildas, or, The Three Paths (1847) is largely set in the village in the eighteenth century.

== See also ==
- Communes of the Côtes-d'Armor department
