= Le Vieux-Bourg =

Le Vieux-Bourg Bourc'h-Kintin
- Commune
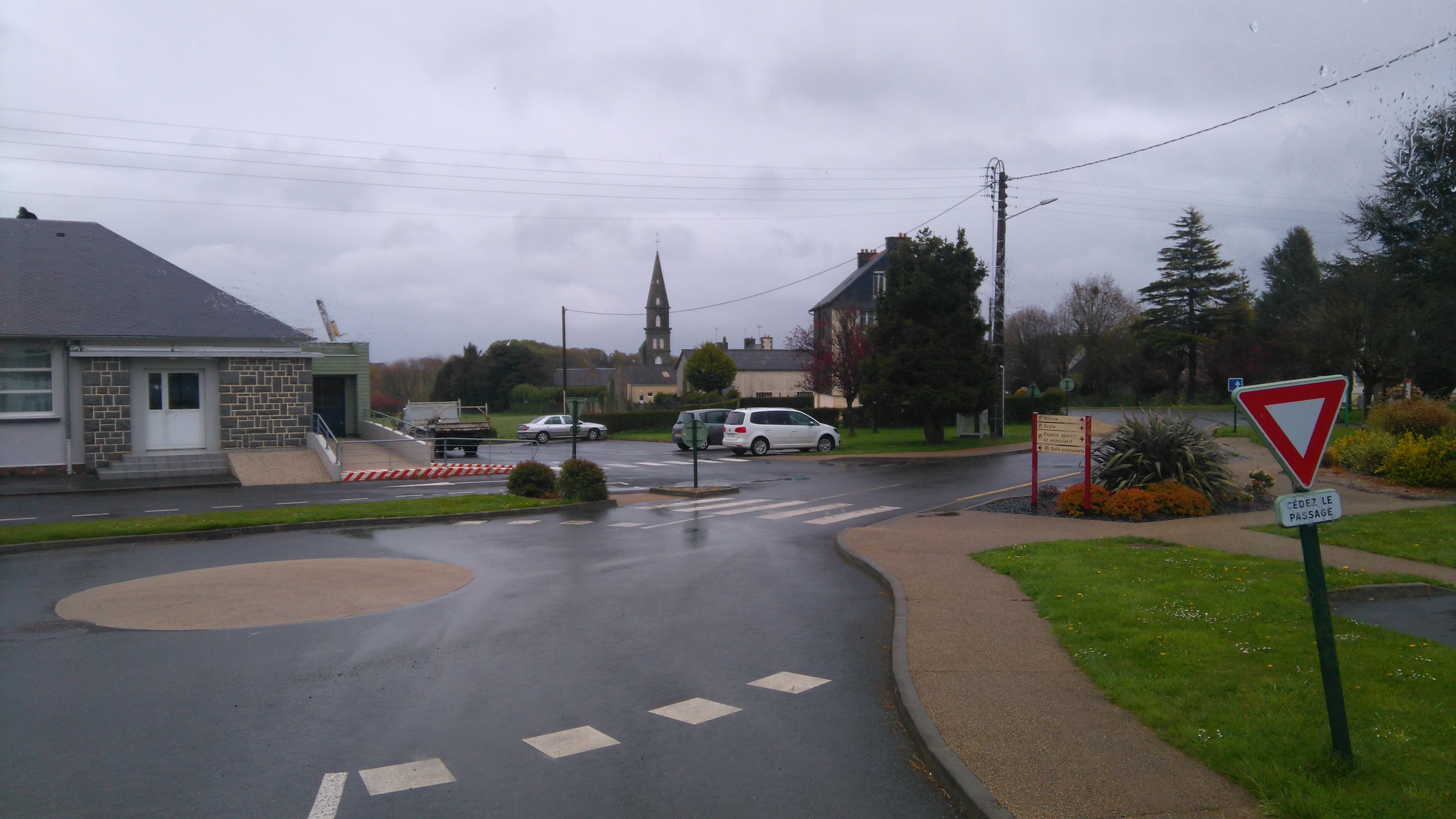
- A view within Le Vieux-Bourg
- Location of Le Vieux-Bourg
- Location within France Location within Brittany
- Coordinates: 48°23′21″N 2°59′57″W
- Country: France
- Region: Brittany
- Department: Côtes-d'Armor
- Arrondissement: Saint-Brieuc
- Canton: Plélo
- Intercommunality: Saint-Brieuc Armor

Government
  - Mayor (2020–2026): Christian Ranno
- Area^{1}: 25.13 km^{2} (9.70 sq mi)
- Highest elevation: 306 m (1,004 ft)
- Lowest elevation: 188 m (617 ft)
- Population (2023): 742
  - Density: 29.5/km^{2} (76.5/sq mi)
- Time zone: UTC+01:00 (CET)
  - Summer (DST): UTC+02:00 (CEST)
- INSEE/Postal code: 22386 /22800
- ^{1} French Land Register data, which excludes lakes, ponds, glaciers > 1 km^{2} (0.386 sq mi or 247 acres) and river estuaries.

Le Vieux-Bourg (French pronunciation: [lə vjø buʁ]; Breton: Bourc'h-Kintin) is a commune in the Côtes-d'Armor department of Brittany in northwestern France.

== Population ==
Historical population
Year	Pop.	±% p.a.
1968	816	—
1975	759	−1.03%
1982	665	−1.87%
1990	645	−0.38%
1999	608	−0.65%
2007	720	+2.14%
2012	776	+1.51%
2017	781	+0.13%
2023	742	−0.85%
Source: INSEE

The people of Le Vieux-Bourg are called vieux-bourgeois in French.

== See also ==
- Communes of the Côtes-d'Armor department
