= Cohiniac =

Cohiniac Kaouennieg
- Commune
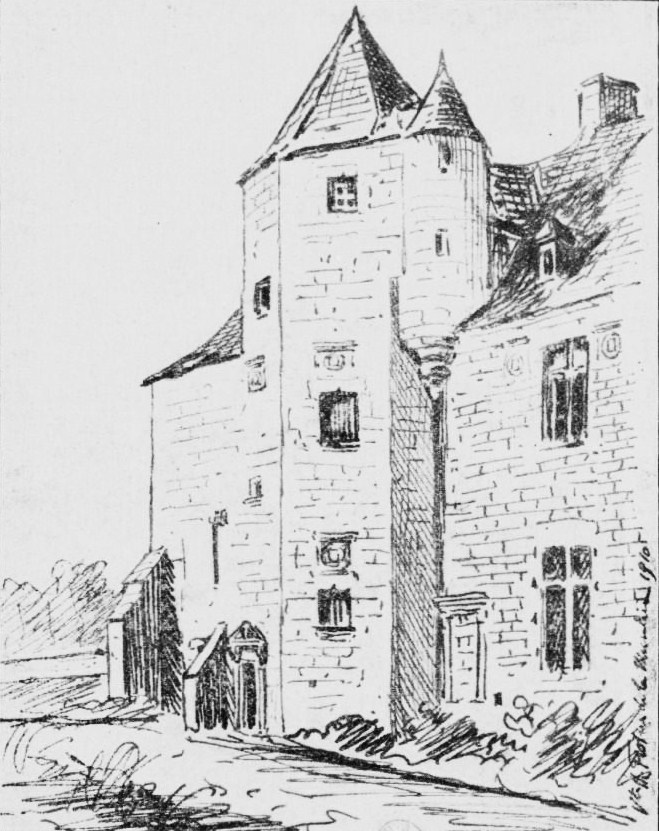
- The château of Beaumanoir-Eder

- Coat of arms
- Location of Cohiniac
- Location within France Location within Brittany
- Coordinates: 48°27′42″N 2°56′51″W
- Country: France
- Region: Brittany
- Department: Côtes-d'Armor
- Arrondissement: Guingamp
- Canton: Plélo
- Intercommunality: Leff Armor Communauté

Government
  - Mayor (2020–2026): Jean-Paul Héder
- Area^{1}: 12.26 km^{2} (4.73 sq mi)
- Highest elevation: 246 m (807 ft)
- Lowest elevation: 139 m (456 ft)
- Population (2023): 402
  - Density: 32.8/km^{2} (84.9/sq mi)
- Time zone: UTC+01:00 (CET)
  - Summer (DST): UTC+02:00 (CEST)
- INSEE/Postal code: 22045 /22800
- ^{1} French Land Register data, which excludes lakes, ponds, glaciers > 1 km^{2} (0.386 sq mi or 247 acres) and river estuaries.

Cohiniac (French pronunciation: [kɔinjak]; Breton: Kaouennieg; Gallo: Coheinyac) is a commune in the Côtes-d'Armor department of Brittany in northwestern France.

== Population ==
Historical population
Year	Pop.	±% p.a.
1968	408	—
1975	393	−0.53%
1982	390	−0.11%
1990	370	−0.66%
1999	351	−0.58%
2007	348	−0.11%
2012	409	+3.28%
2017	357	−2.68%
2023	402	+2.00%
Source: INSEE

Inhabitants of Cohiniac are called Cohiniacais in French.

== See also ==
- Communes of the Côtes-d'Armor department
