= Saint-Fiacre, Côtes-d'Armor =

Saint-Fiacre Sant-Fieg
- Commune
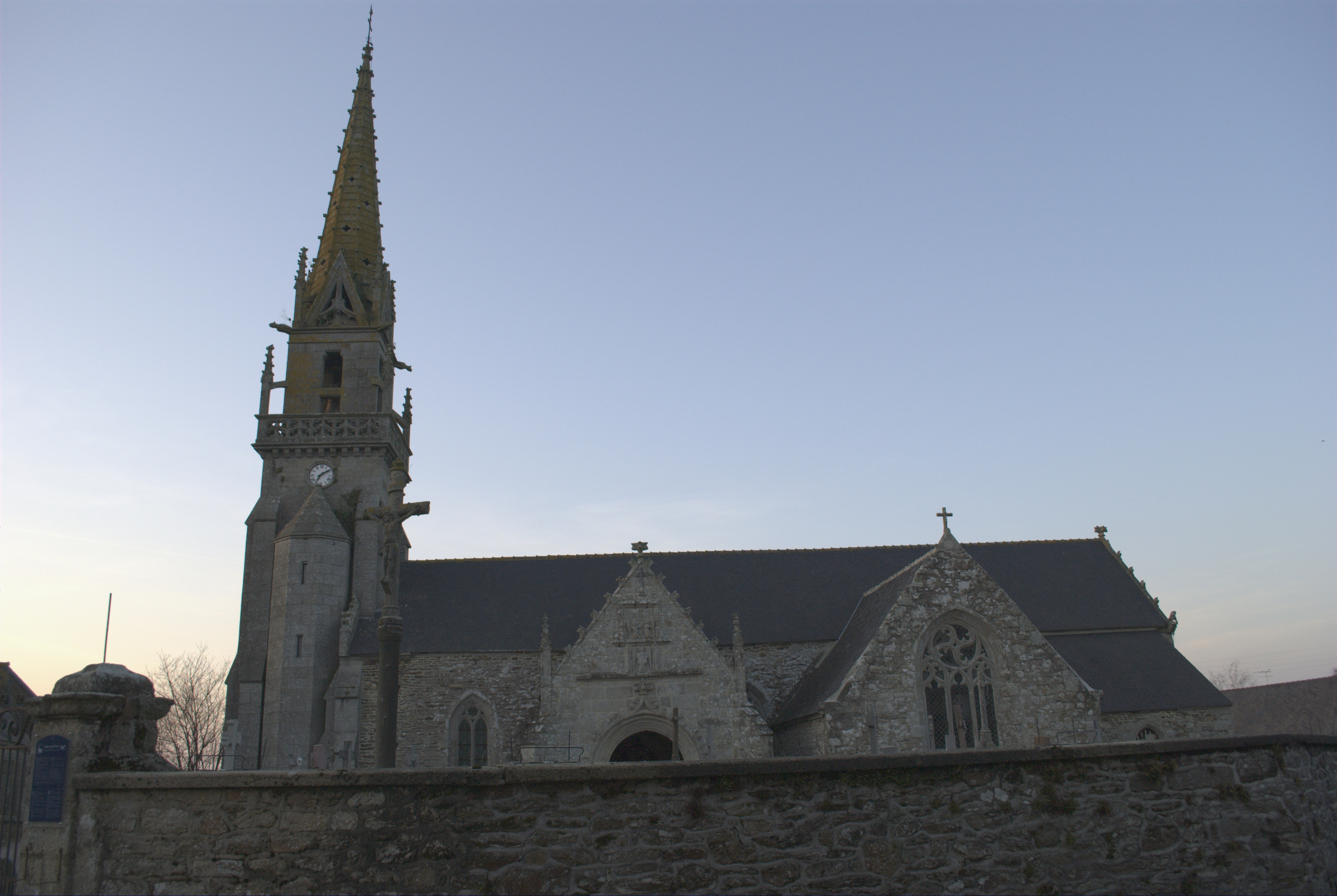
- The church in Saint-Fiacre
- Location of Saint-Fiacre
- Location within France Location within Brittany
- Coordinates: 48°27′42″N 3°03′34″W
- Country: France
- Region: Brittany
- Department: Côtes-d'Armor
- Arrondissement: Guingamp
- Canton: Plélo

Government
  - Mayor (2020–2026): Gilbert Le Bihan
- Area^{1}: 9.70 km^{2} (3.75 sq mi)
- Highest elevation: 228 m (748 ft)
- Lowest elevation: 114 m (374 ft)
- Population (2023): 210
  - Density: 22/km^{2} (56/sq mi)
- Time zone: UTC+01:00 (CET)
  - Summer (DST): UTC+02:00 (CEST)
- INSEE/Postal code: 22289 /22720
- ^{1} French Land Register data, which excludes lakes, ponds, glaciers > 1 km^{2} (0.386 sq mi or 247 acres) and river estuaries.

Saint-Fiacre (French pronunciation: [sɛ̃ fjakʁ]; Breton: Sant-Fieg) is a commune in the Côtes-d'Armor department of Brittany in northwestern France.

== Population ==
Historical population
Year	Pop.	±% p.a.
1968	299	—
1975	244	−2.86%
1982	232	−0.72%
1990	207	−1.42%
1999	197	−0.55%
2007	226	+1.73%
2012	225	−0.09%
2017	212	−1.18%
2023	210	−0.16%
Source: INSEE

== See also ==
- Communes of the Côtes-d'Armor department
