= Bringolo =

Bringolo Brengoloù
- Commune
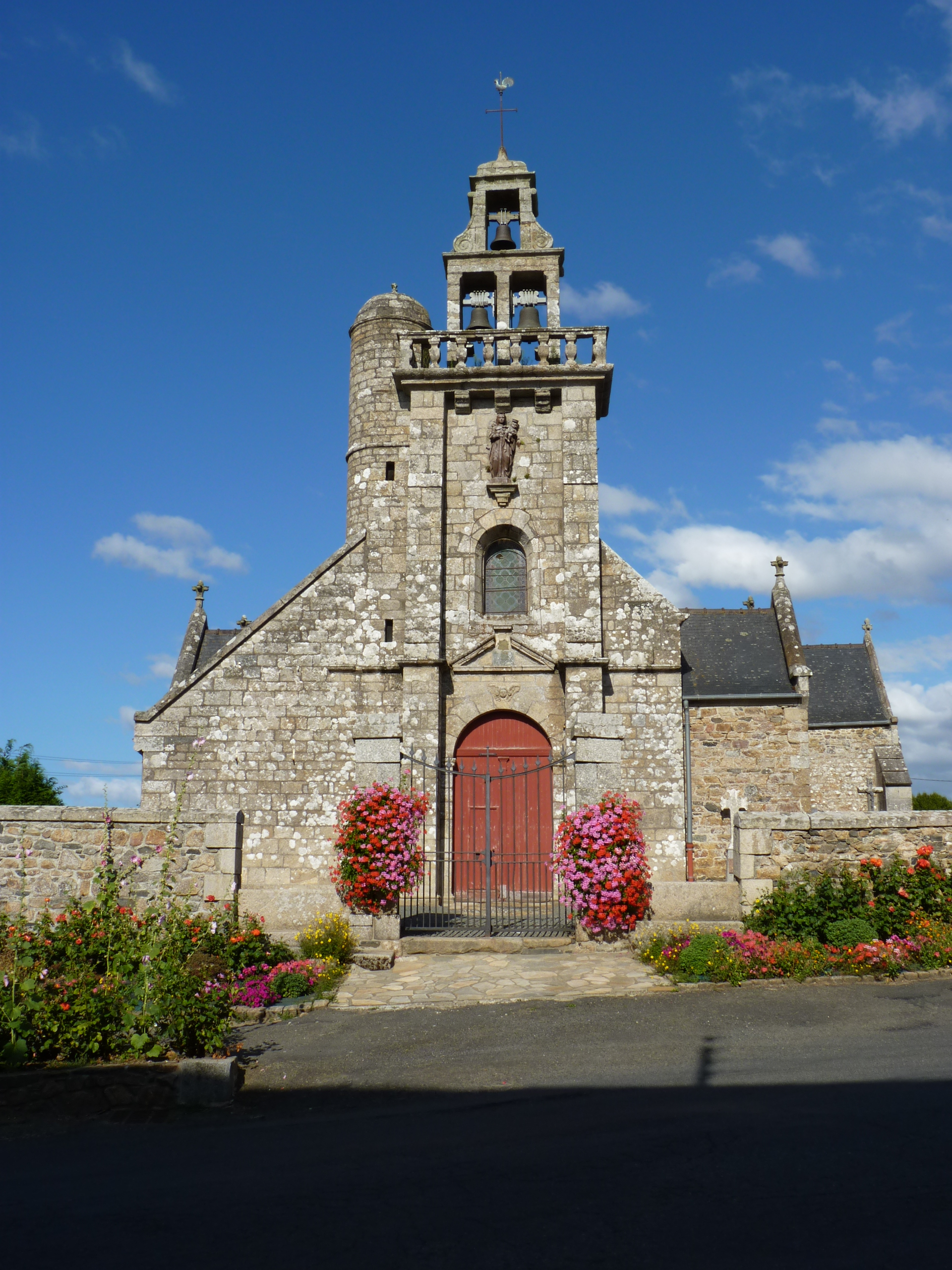
- The church of Notre-Dame, in Bringolo
- Location of Bringolo
- Location within France Location within Brittany
- Coordinates: 48°34′37″N 3°00′05″W
- Country: France
- Region: Brittany
- Department: Côtes-d'Armor
- Arrondissement: Guingamp
- Canton: Plélo
- Intercommunality: Leff Armor Communauté

Government
  - Mayor (2020–2026): Philippe Thomas
- Area^{1}: 9.38 km^{2} (3.62 sq mi)
- Highest elevation: 132 m (433 ft)
- Lowest elevation: 57 m (187 ft)
- Population (2023): 518
  - Density: 55.2/km^{2} (143/sq mi)
- Time zone: UTC+01:00 (CET)
  - Summer (DST): UTC+02:00 (CEST)
- INSEE/Postal code: 22019 /22170
- ^{1} French Land Register data, which excludes lakes, ponds, glaciers > 1 km^{2} (0.386 sq mi or 247 acres) and river estuaries.

Bringolo (French pronunciation: [bʁɛ̃gɔlo]; Breton: Brengoloù; Gallo: Brengolo) is a commune in the Côtes-d'Armor department of Brittany in north-western France.

== Population ==
Historical population
Year	Pop.	±% p.a.
1968	397	—
1975	348	−1.86%
1982	329	−0.80%
1990	301	−1.11%
1999	304	+0.11%
2007	361	+2.17%
2012	432	+3.66%
2017	470	+1.70%
2023	518	+1.63%
Source: INSEE

Inhabitants of Bringolo are called Bringolois in French.

== See also ==
- Communes of the Côtes-d'Armor department
