= Plouvara =

Plouvara Plouvara
- Commune
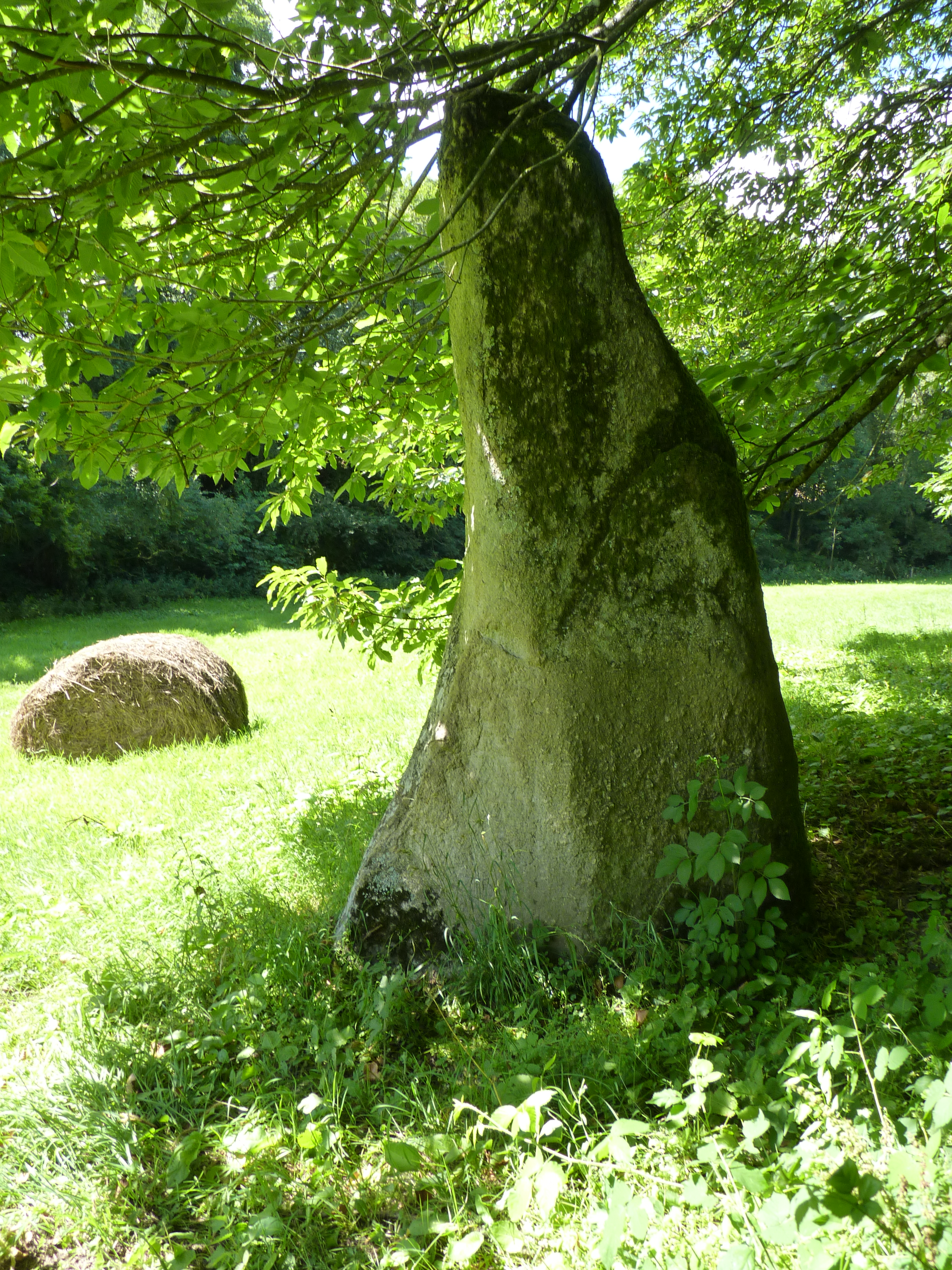
- The menhir of Le Pré de Camet, in Plouvara

- Coat of arms
- Location of Plouvara
- Location within France Location within Brittany
- Coordinates: 48°30′28″N 2°54′51″W
- Country: France
- Region: Brittany
- Department: Côtes-d'Armor
- Arrondissement: Guingamp
- Canton: Plélo
- Intercommunality: Leff Armor Communauté

Government
  - Mayor (2020–2026): Cyril Nicolas
- Area^{1}: 22.19 km^{2} (8.57 sq mi)
- Highest elevation: 213 m (699 ft)
- Lowest elevation: 114 m (374 ft)
- Population (2023): 1,144
  - Density: 51.55/km^{2} (133.5/sq mi)
- Time zone: UTC+01:00 (CET)
  - Summer (DST): UTC+02:00 (CEST)
- INSEE/Postal code: 22234 /22170
- ^{1} French Land Register data, which excludes lakes, ponds, glaciers > 1 km^{2} (0.386 sq mi or 247 acres) and river estuaries.

Plouvara (French pronunciation: [pluvaʁa]; Breton: Plouvara) is a commune in the Côtes-d'Armor departmentof Brittany in northwestern France.

== Population ==
Historical population
Year	Pop.	±% p.a.
1968	793	—
1975	780	−0.24%
1982	864	+1.47%
1990	933	+0.97%
1999	912	−0.25%
2007	1,068	+1.99%
2012	1,129	+1.12%
2017	1,147	+0.32%
2023	1,144	−0.04%
Source: INSEE

Inhabitants of Plouvara are called plouvaratins in French.

== See also ==
- Communes of the Côtes-d'Armor department
