= Saint-Brieuc Armor Agglomération =

- Communauté d'agglomération
- Interactive map of Saint-Brieuc Armor Agglomération
- Country: France
- Region: Brittany
- Department: Côtes-d'Armor
- No. of communes: {{{nbcomm}}}
- Established: 2017
- Area: 600.7 km^{2} (231.9 sq mi)
- Population (2017): 151,733
  - Density: 252.6/km^{2} (654.2/sq mi)
- Website: www.saintbrieuc-armor-agglo.bzh

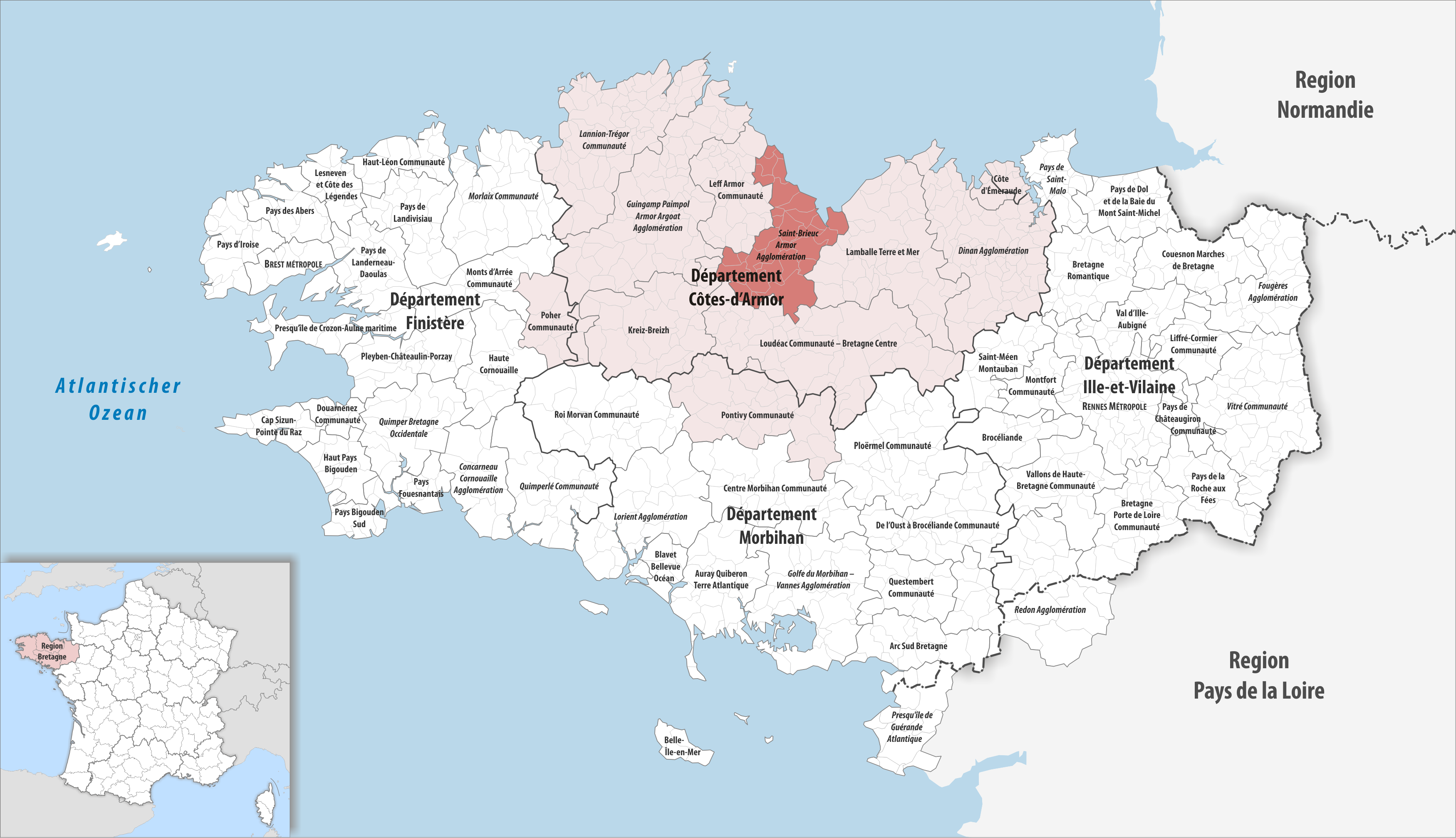
Saint-Brieuc Armor Agglomeration Municipal Associations

Saint-Brieuc Armor Agglomération (Breton: Bodadeg armoù Sant-Brieg) is the communauté d'agglomération, an intercommunal structure, centred on the city of Saint-Brieuc. It is located in the Côtes-d'Armor department, in the Brittany region, western France. It was created in January 2017. Its seat is in Saint-Brieuc. Its area is 600.7 km^{2} (231.9 sq mi). Its population was 151,733 in 2017, of which 44,372 in Saint-Brieuc proper.

== Composition ==
The communauté d'agglomération consists of the following 32 communes:

1. Binic-Étables-sur-Mer
2. Le Bodéo
3. Le Fœil
4. Hillion
5. La Harmoye
6. Lanfains
7. Langueux
8. Lantic
9. Le Leslay
10. La Méaugon
11. Plaine-Haute
12. Plaintel
13. Plédran
14. Plérin
15. Plœuc-l'Hermitage
16. Ploufragan
17. Plourhan
18. Pordic
19. Quintin
20. Saint-Bihy
21. Saint-Brandan
22. Saint-Brieuc
23. Saint-Carreuc
24. Saint-Donan
25. Saint-Gildas
26. Saint-Julien
27. Saint-Quay-Portrieux
28. Trégueux
29. Trémuson
30. Tréveneuc
31. Le Vieux-Bourg
32. Yffiniac
