= Quintin =

- Commune
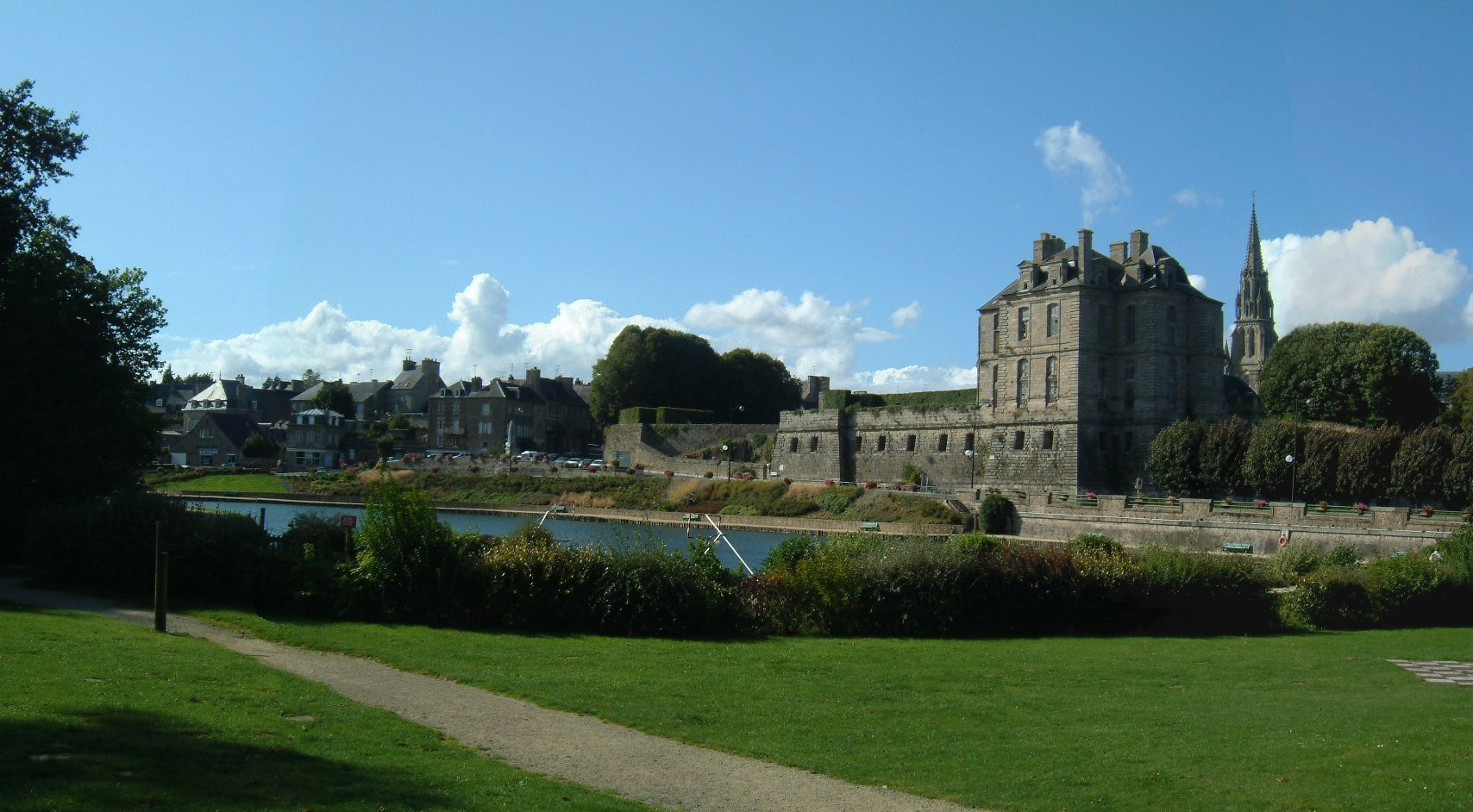
- The lake and chateau of Quintin

- Coat of arms
- Location of Quintin
- Location within France Location within Brittany
- Coordinates: 48°24′16″N 2°54′29″W
- Country: France
- Region: Brittany
- Department: Côtes-d'Armor
- Arrondissement: Saint-Brieuc
- Canton: Plélo
- Intercommunality: Saint-Brieuc Armor

Government
  - Mayor (2020–2026): Nicolas Carro
- Area^{1}: 3.12 km^{2} (1.20 sq mi)
- Highest elevation: 220 m (720 ft)
- Lowest elevation: 154 m (505 ft)
- Population (2023): 2,739
  - Density: 878/km^{2} (2,270/sq mi)
- Time zone: UTC+01:00 (CET)
  - Summer (DST): UTC+02:00 (CEST)
- INSEE/Postal code: 22262 /22800
- ^{1} French Land Register data, which excludes lakes, ponds, glaciers > 1 km^{2} (0.386 sq mi or 247 acres) and river estuaries.

Quintin (French pronunciation: [kɛ̃tɛ̃]; Breton: Kintin) is a commune in the Cotes-d'Armor department (Brittany region) in the northwest of France 16 kilometres (9.9 mi) from Saint-Brieuc, the department capital.

== History ==
The area around Quintin has been occupied since the Neolithic. Early Quintin was originally located near Vieux-Bourg but, following a plague epidemic, the city moved to its current location. Quintin in Roman times was located on a crossroads but significantly developed in the seventeenth and eighteenth centuries, due to the weaving industry and the trade of linen cloth. Still, the decline came with the French Revolution and cotton gradually taking the lead over linen. At the height Quintin had 300 weavers. Quintin was also a monastic center. But despite its monuments and mansions that one can still see the city, it no longer has the importance it once had. The French Revolution and the wars of religion have left the fabric of the ancient and medieval city devastated. In 1843, the geographical and historical dictionary of the province of Brittany, by Jean Ogée explains that the denizens of Quintin speak French and Breton.

== Population ==
Historical population

Year	Pop.	±% p.a.
1793	4,336	—
1800	4,073	−0.89%
1806	3,864	−0.87%
1821	4,252	+0.64%
1831	4,293	+0.10%
1836	4,454	+0.74%
1841	4,112	−1.59%
1846	4,021	−0.45%
1851	3,763	−1.32%
1856	3,617	−0.79%
1861	3,710	+0.51%
1866	3,690	−0.11%
1872	3,411	−1.30%
1876	3,331	−0.59%
1881	3,281	−0.30%
1886	3,319	+0.23%
1891	3,186	−0.81%
1896	3,194	+0.05%
1901	3,198	+0.03%

Year	Pop.	±% p.a.
1906	2,948	−1.61%
1911	2,823	−0.86%
1921	2,451	−1.40%
1926	2,300	−1.26%
1931	2,190	−0.98%
1936	2,574	+3.28%
1946	2,768	+0.73%
1954	2,643	−0.58%
1962	2,593	−0.24%
1968	2,727	+0.84%
1975	2,857	+0.67%
1982	2,814	−0.22%
1990	2,602	−0.97%
1999	2,611	+0.04%
2007	2,844	+1.07%
2012	2,826	−0.13%
2017	2,838	+0.08%
2023	2,739	−0.59%

Source: EHESS and INSEE (1968-2023)

Inhabitants of Quintin are called quintinais in French.

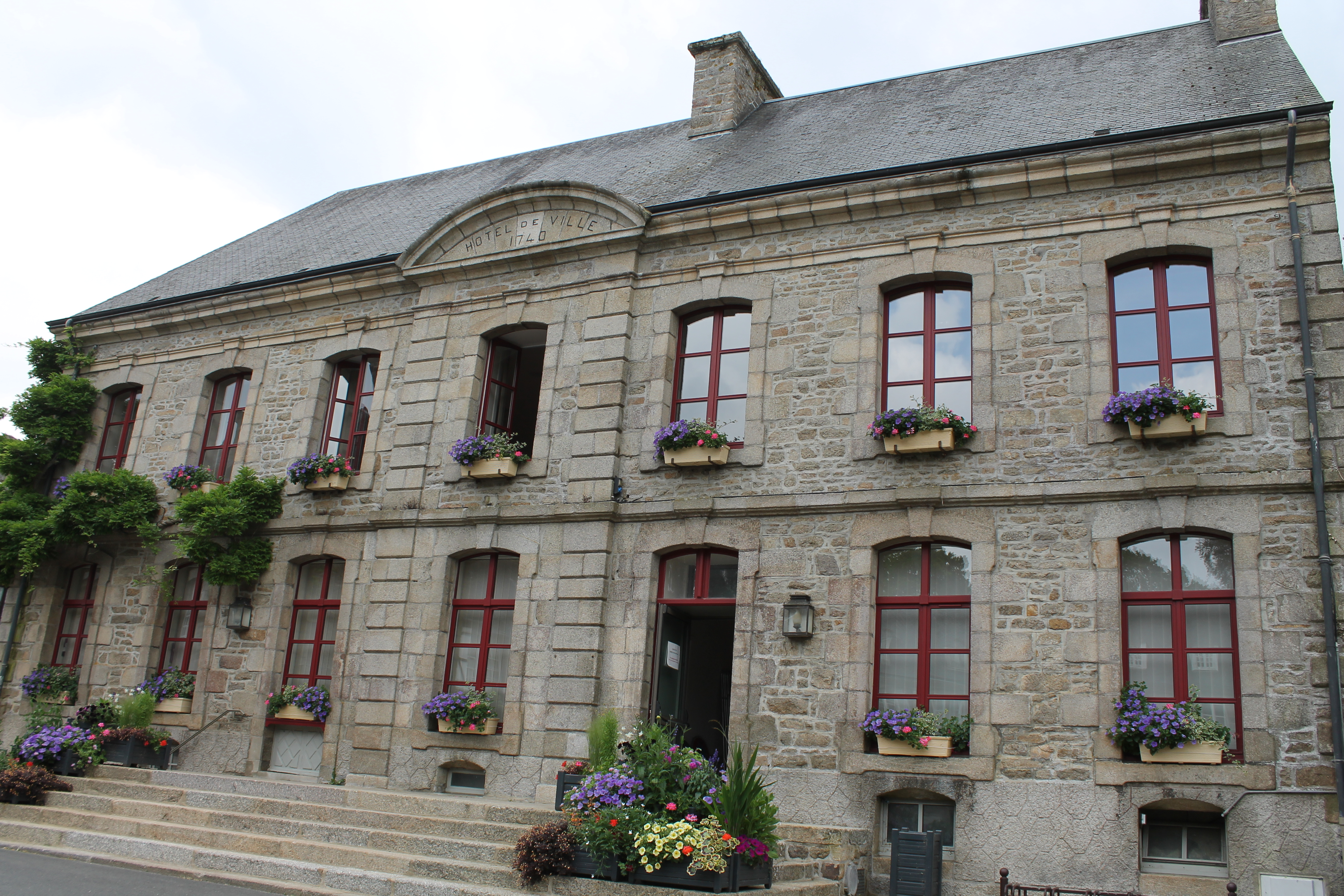
Quintin town hall

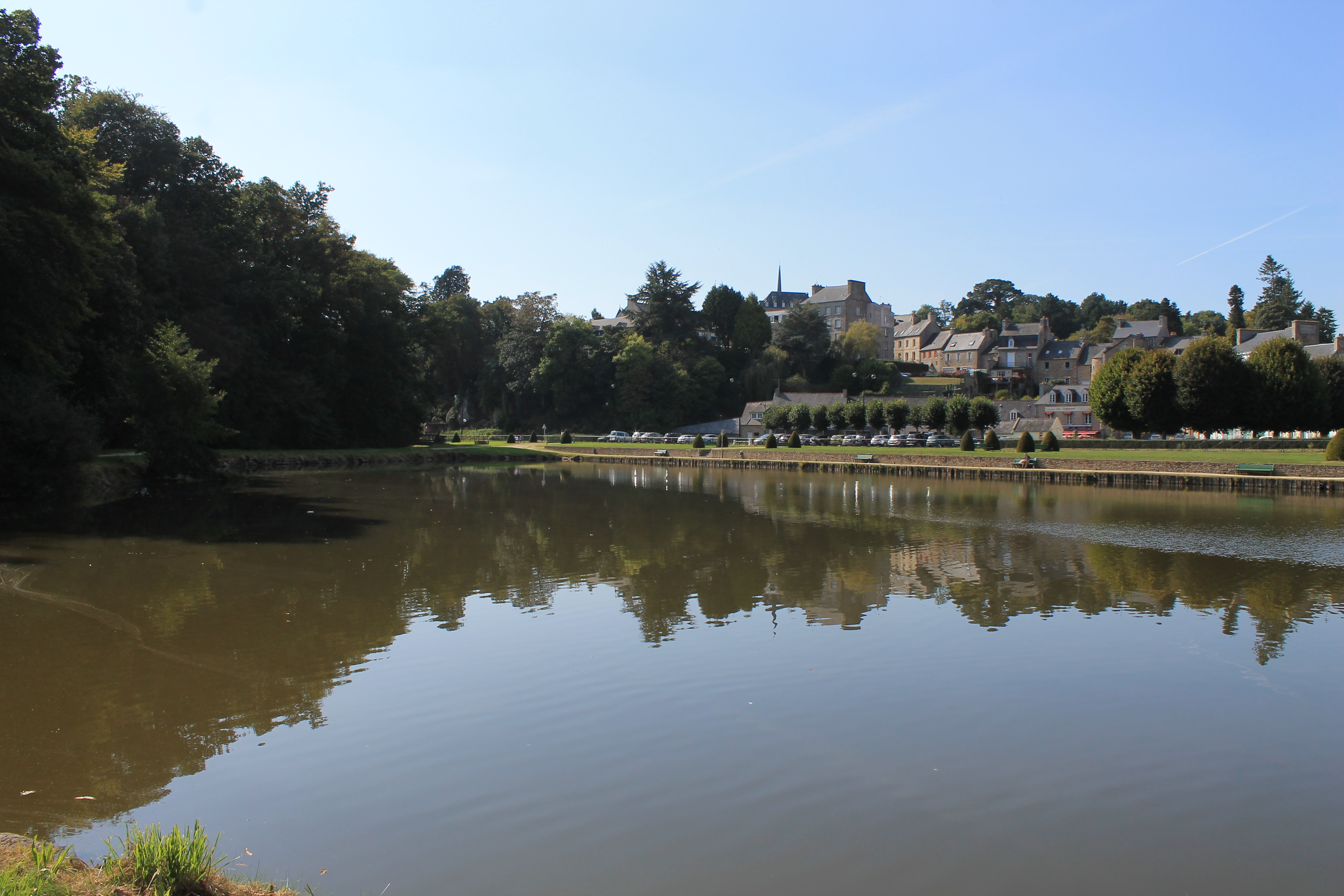
Quintin seen from the lake.

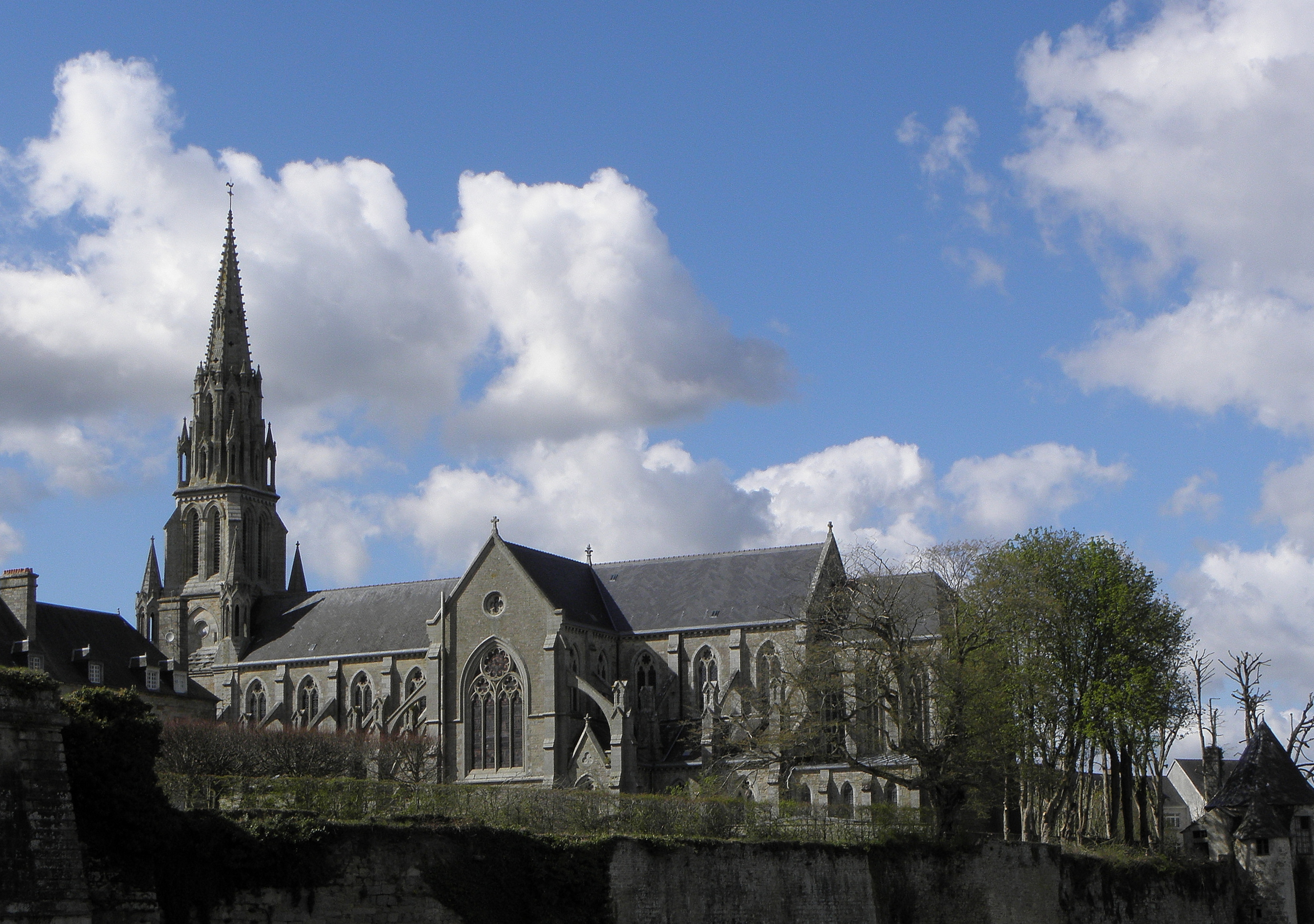
Quintin Basilica

== Mayor ==
- 1929 1940 Alfred Duault
- March 2001 2008 Claude Morin
- March 2008 March 2014 Yves Briens
- from March 2014 Mireille Airault

== See also ==
- Communes of the Côtes-d'Armor department
- Élie Le Goff. Sculptor of Quintin war memorial
- Frome St Quintin, Dorset, England
