= Saint-Bihy =

Saint-Bihy Sant-Bic'hi
- Commune
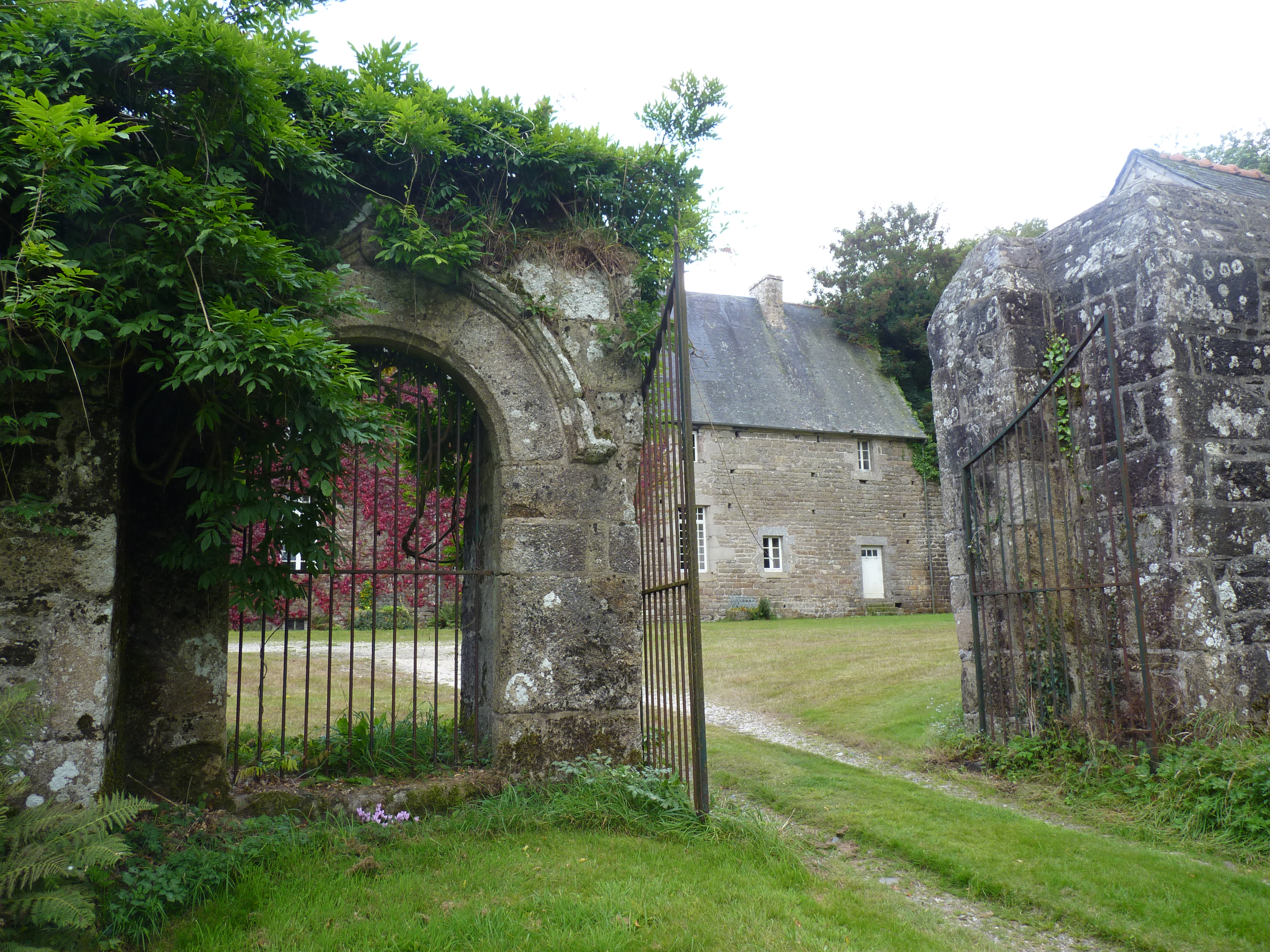
- The gateway to the Grand'Isle Manor, in Saint-Bihy
- Location of Saint-Bihy
- Location within France Location within Brittany
- Coordinates: 48°22′47″N 2°58′10″W
- Country: France
- Region: Brittany
- Department: Côtes-d'Armor
- Arrondissement: Saint-Brieuc
- Canton: Plélo
- Intercommunality: Saint-Brieuc Armor

Government
  - Mayor (2020–2026): Olivier Mérot
- Area^{1}: 8.22 km^{2} (3.17 sq mi)
- Highest elevation: 315 m (1,033 ft)
- Lowest elevation: 185 m (607 ft)
- Population (2023): 267
  - Density: 32.5/km^{2} (84.1/sq mi)
- Time zone: UTC+01:00 (CET)
  - Summer (DST): UTC+02:00 (CEST)
- INSEE/Postal code: 22276 /22800
- ^{1} French Land Register data, which excludes lakes, ponds, glaciers > 1 km^{2} (0.386 sq mi or 247 acres) and river estuaries.

Saint-Bihy (French pronunciation: [sɛ̃ biji]; Breton: Sant-Bic'hi; Gallo: Saent-Mehi) is a commune in the Côtes-d'Armor department of Brittany in northwestern France.

== Population ==
Historical population
Year	Pop.	±% p.a.
1968	158	—
1975	160	+0.18%
1982	173	+1.12%
1990	198	+1.70%
1999	201	+0.17%
2007	176	−1.65%
2012	222	+4.75%
2017	262	+3.37%
2023	267	+0.32%
Source: INSEE

Inhabitants of Saint-Bihy are called bihicois in French.

== See also ==
- Communes of the Côtes-d'Armor department
