= Le Fœil =

Le Fœil Ar Fouilh
- Commune
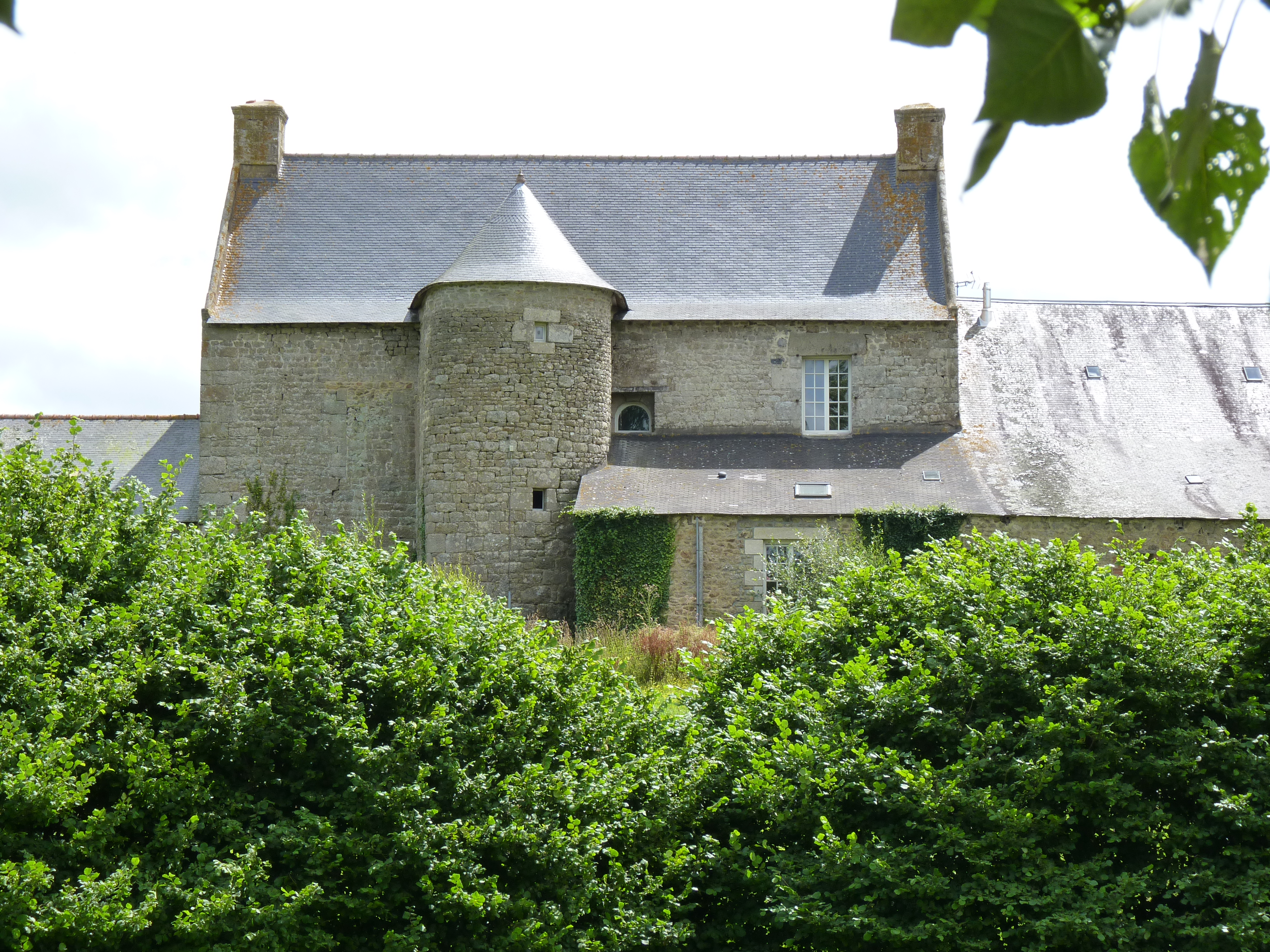
- Guermain Manor in Le Fœil
- Location of Le Fœil
- Location within France Location within Brittany
- Coordinates: 48°25′46″N 2°54′50″W
- Country: France
- Region: Brittany
- Department: Côtes-d'Armor
- Arrondissement: Saint-Brieuc
- Canton: Plélo
- Intercommunality: Saint-Brieuc Armor

Government
  - Mayor (2020–2026): Pascal Prido
- Area^{1}: 20.54 km^{2} (7.93 sq mi)
- Highest elevation: 256 m (840 ft)
- Lowest elevation: 129 m (423 ft)
- Population (2023): 1,375
  - Density: 66.94/km^{2} (173.4/sq mi)
- Time zone: UTC+01:00 (CET)
  - Summer (DST): UTC+02:00 (CEST)
- INSEE/Postal code: 22059 /22800
- ^{1} French Land Register data, which excludes lakes, ponds, glaciers > 1 km^{2} (0.386 sq mi or 247 acres) and river estuaries.

Le Fœil (French pronunciation: [lə fœj] or [lə faj]; Breton: Ar Fouilh) is a commune in the Côtes-d'Armor department of Brittany in northwestern France.

== Population ==
Historical population
Year	Pop.	±% p.a.
1968	884	—
1975	888	+0.06%
1982	1,084	+2.89%
1990	1,085	+0.01%
1999	1,124	+0.39%
2007	1,374	+2.54%
2012	1,509	+1.89%
2017	1,429	−1.08%
2023	1,375	−0.64%
Source: INSEE

Inhabitants of Le Fœil are called fœillais in French.

== See also ==
- Communes of the Côtes-d'Armor department
