= Saint-Brandan =

Saint-Brandan Sant-Vedan
- Commune
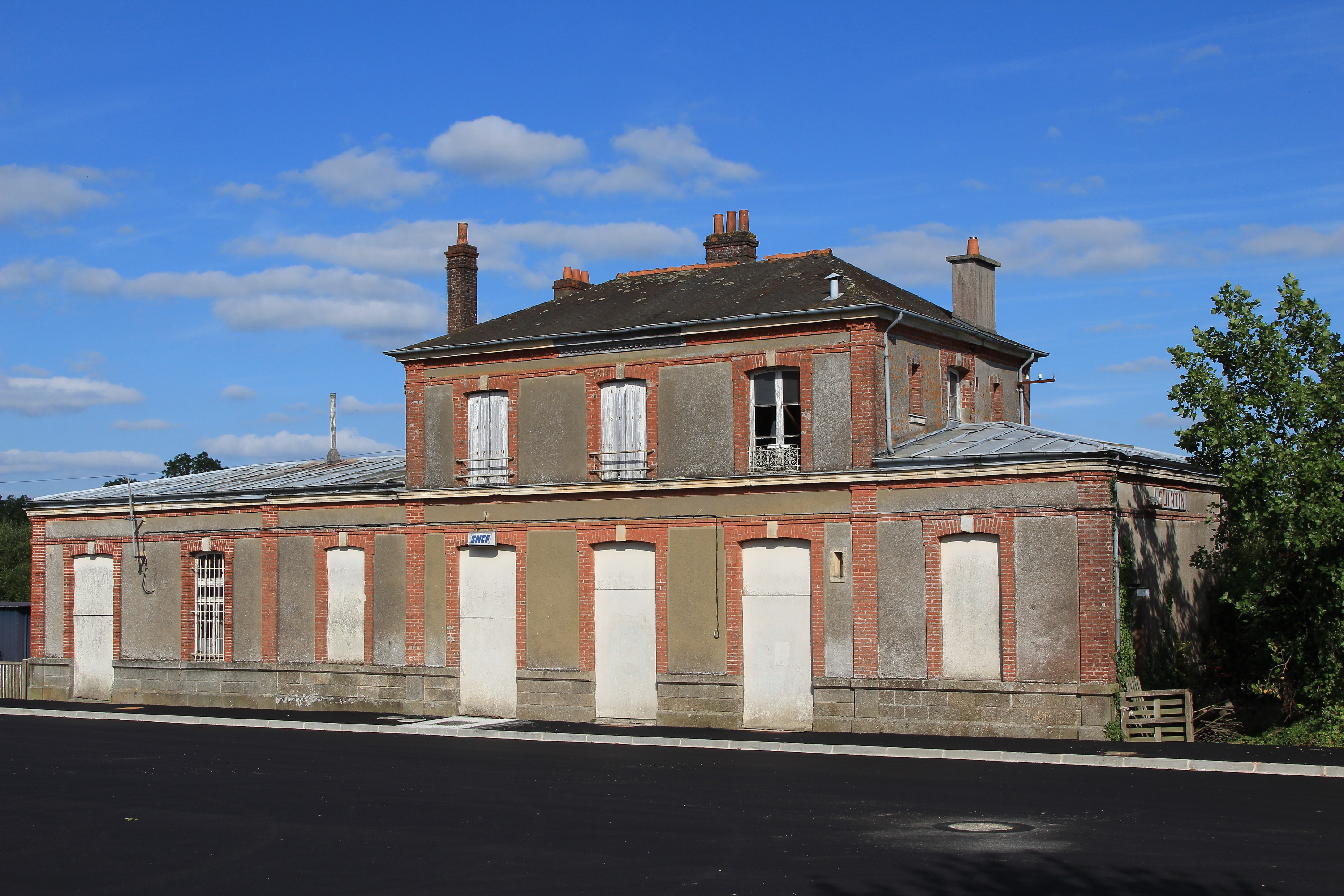
- The Gare de Quintin
- Location of Saint-Brandan
- Location within France Location within Brittany
- Coordinates: 48°23′25″N 2°52′08″W
- Country: France
- Region: Brittany
- Department: Côtes-d'Armor
- Arrondissement: Saint-Brieuc
- Canton: Plélo
- Intercommunality: Saint-Brieuc Armor

Government
  - Mayor (2020–2026): Christian Jolly
- Area^{1}: 25.16 km^{2} (9.71 sq mi)
- Highest elevation: 261 m (856 ft)
- Lowest elevation: 122 m (400 ft)
- Population (2023): 2,317
  - Density: 92.09/km^{2} (238.5/sq mi)
- Time zone: UTC+01:00 (CET)
  - Summer (DST): UTC+02:00 (CEST)
- INSEE/Postal code: 22277 /22800
- ^{1} French Land Register data, which excludes lakes, ponds, glaciers > 1 km^{2} (0.386 sq mi or 247 acres) and river estuaries.

Saint-Brandan (French pronunciation: [sɛ̃ bʁɑ̃dɑ̃]; Breton: Sant-Vedan; Gallo: Saent-Medan) is a commune in the Côtes-d'Armor department of Brittany in northwestern France.

== Population ==
Inhabitants of Saint-Brandan are called brandanais in French.

Historical population
Year	Pop.	±% p.a.
1968	1,741	—
1975	1,706	−0.29%
1982	2,032	+2.53%
1990	2,184	+0.91%
1999	2,240	+0.28%
2007	2,262	+0.12%
2012	2,380	+1.02%
2017	2,368	−0.10%
2023	2,317	−0.36%
Source: INSEE

== See also ==
- Brendan the Navigator
- Communes of the Côtes-d'Armor department
