= Le Bodéo =

Le Bodéo Bodeoù
- Commune
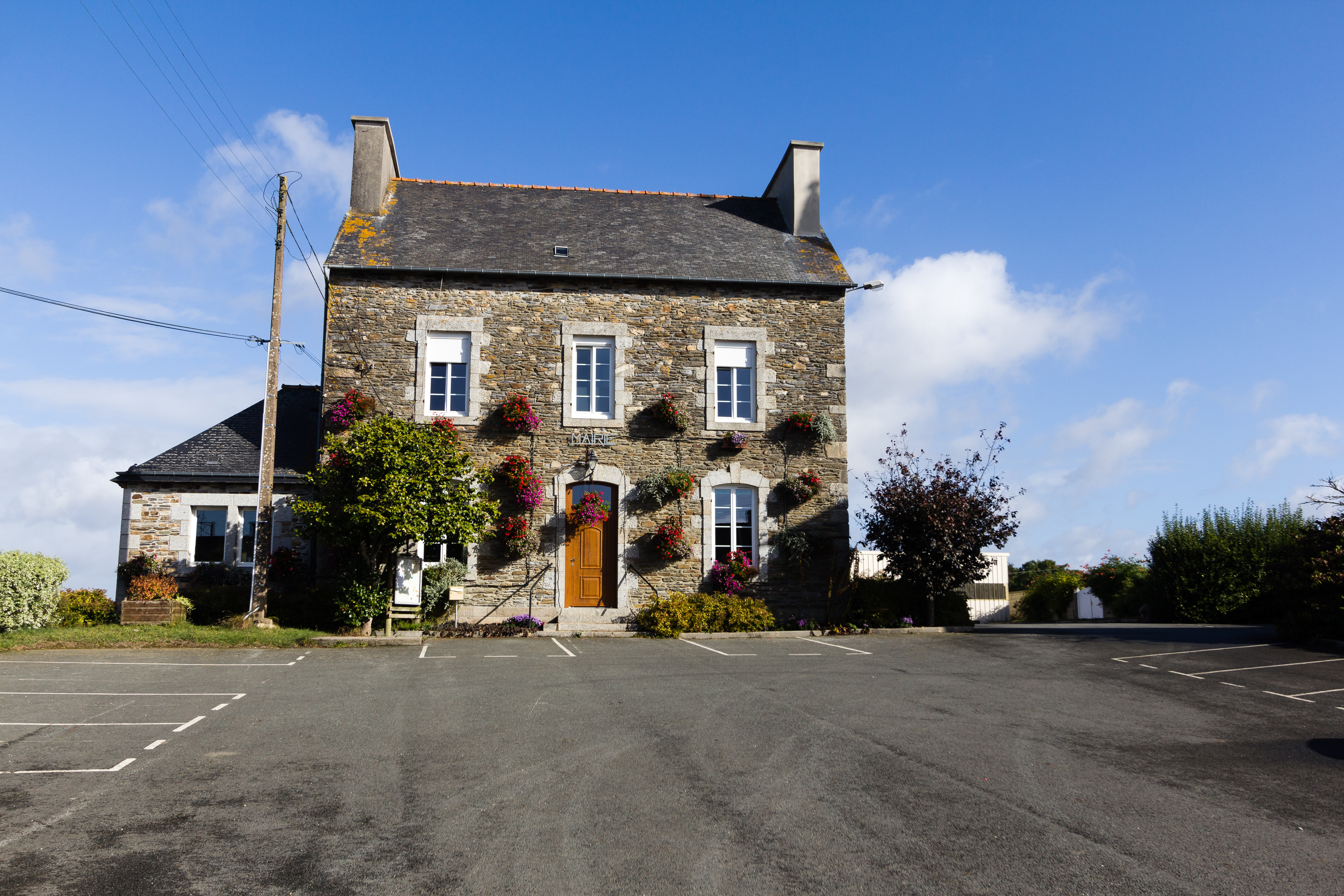
- The town hall of Le Bodéo
- Location of Le Bodéo
- Location within France Location within Brittany
- Coordinates: 48°19′23″N 2°55′56″W
- Country: France
- Region: Brittany
- Department: Côtes-d'Armor
- Arrondissement: Saint-Brieuc
- Canton: Plaintel
- Intercommunality: Saint-Brieuc Armor

Government
  - Mayor (2020–2026): Michel Jouan
- Area^{1}: 9.97 km^{2} (3.85 sq mi)
- Highest elevation: 297 m (974 ft)
- Lowest elevation: 165 m (541 ft)
- Population (2023): 186
  - Density: 18.7/km^{2} (48.3/sq mi)
- Time zone: UTC+01:00 (CET)
  - Summer (DST): UTC+02:00 (CEST)
- INSEE/Postal code: 22009 /22320
- ^{1} French Land Register data, which excludes lakes, ponds, glaciers > 1 km^{2} (0.386 sq mi or 247 acres) and river estuaries.

Le Bodéo (French pronunciation: [lə bɔdeo]; Breton: Bodeoù; Gallo: Le Bodéo) is a commune in the Côtes-d'Armor department of Brittany in north-western France.

== Population ==
Historical population
Year	Pop.	±% p.a.
1968	357	—
1975	271	−3.86%
1982	236	−1.96%
1990	201	−1.99%
1999	189	−0.68%
2007	185	−0.27%
2012	170	−1.68%
2017	162	−0.96%
2023	186	+2.33%
Source: INSEE

Inhabitants of Le Bodéo are called Bodéosiens in French.

== See also ==
- Communes of the Côtes-d'Armor department
