= Rieul =

Rieul or Saint Rieul may refer to:

== People ==
- Saint Rieul of Senlis (died 260) bishop of Senlis
- Saint Rieul of Reims (died 698) bishop of Reims
- Roland Rieul (born 1906), French soldier and British spy

== Geography ==
- Saint-Rieul, a commune in Brittany, France
- Church of Saint-Rieul, Brenouille, France
- Tour Saint-Rieul, a tower at Church of Saint-Justin in Louvres (Val-d'Oise)

== Language ==
- Rieul (hangul), the Korean letter "ㄹ"
