= Frank Darcel =

French guitarist (1958–2024)

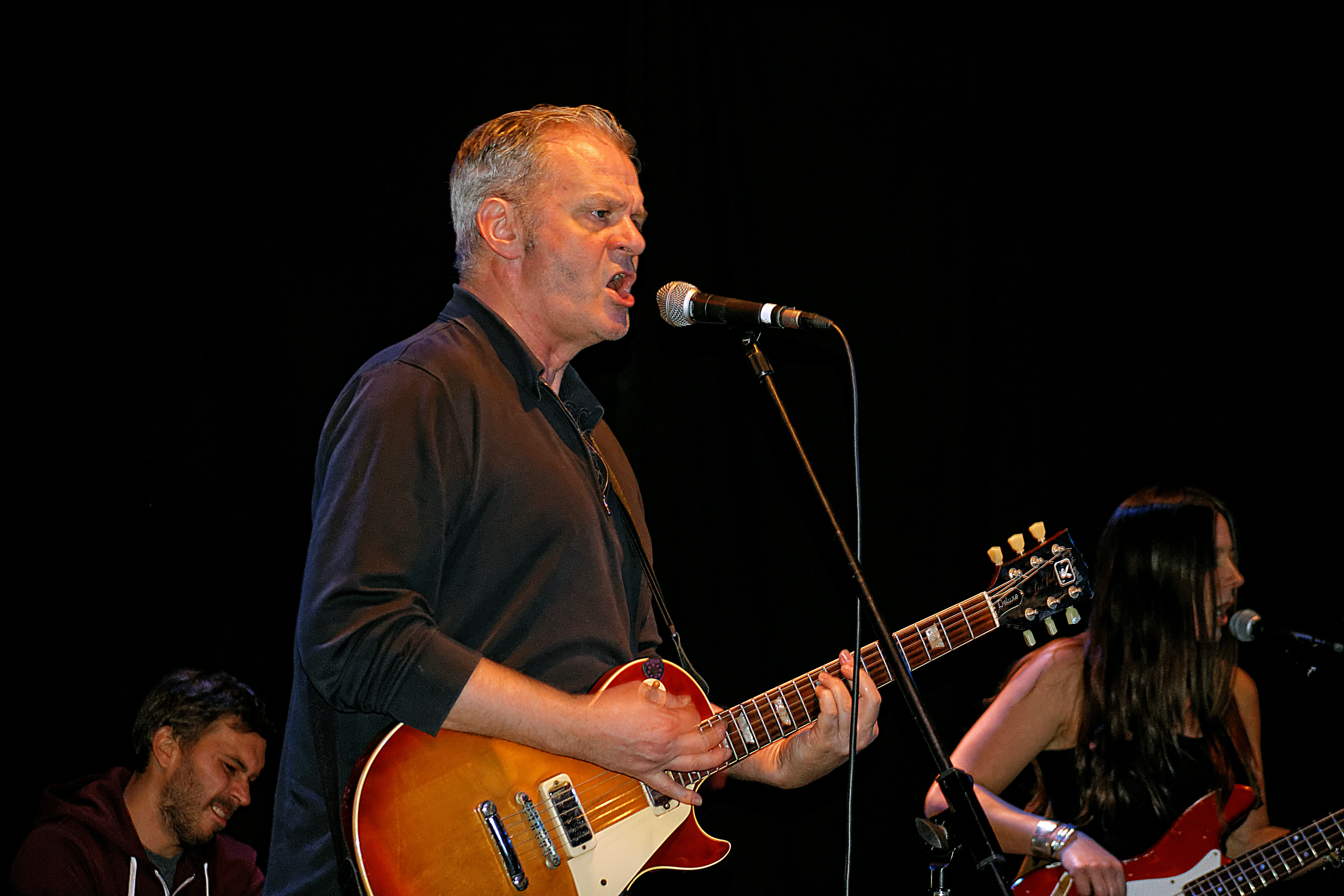
Darcel in 2015

Frank Darcel (26 September 1958 — 14 March 2024) was a French writer, musician and music producer. He was a leading French rock guitarist during the 1980s with the band Marquis de Sade and in his collaboration with Étienne Daho.

Darcel was also Breton nationalist activist and member of the Breton Party. He ran for municipal elections in Rennes on an autonomist list.

== Biography ==
Born in Plessala, a commune where his mother was 1st magistrate and regional councillor, Frank Darcel studied at the Lycée de Loudéac. He followed in his father's footsteps as a doctor in Rennes, but gave up when it was time for his third year and took up music.
