= Langourla =

Langourla Langourlae
- Part of Le Mené
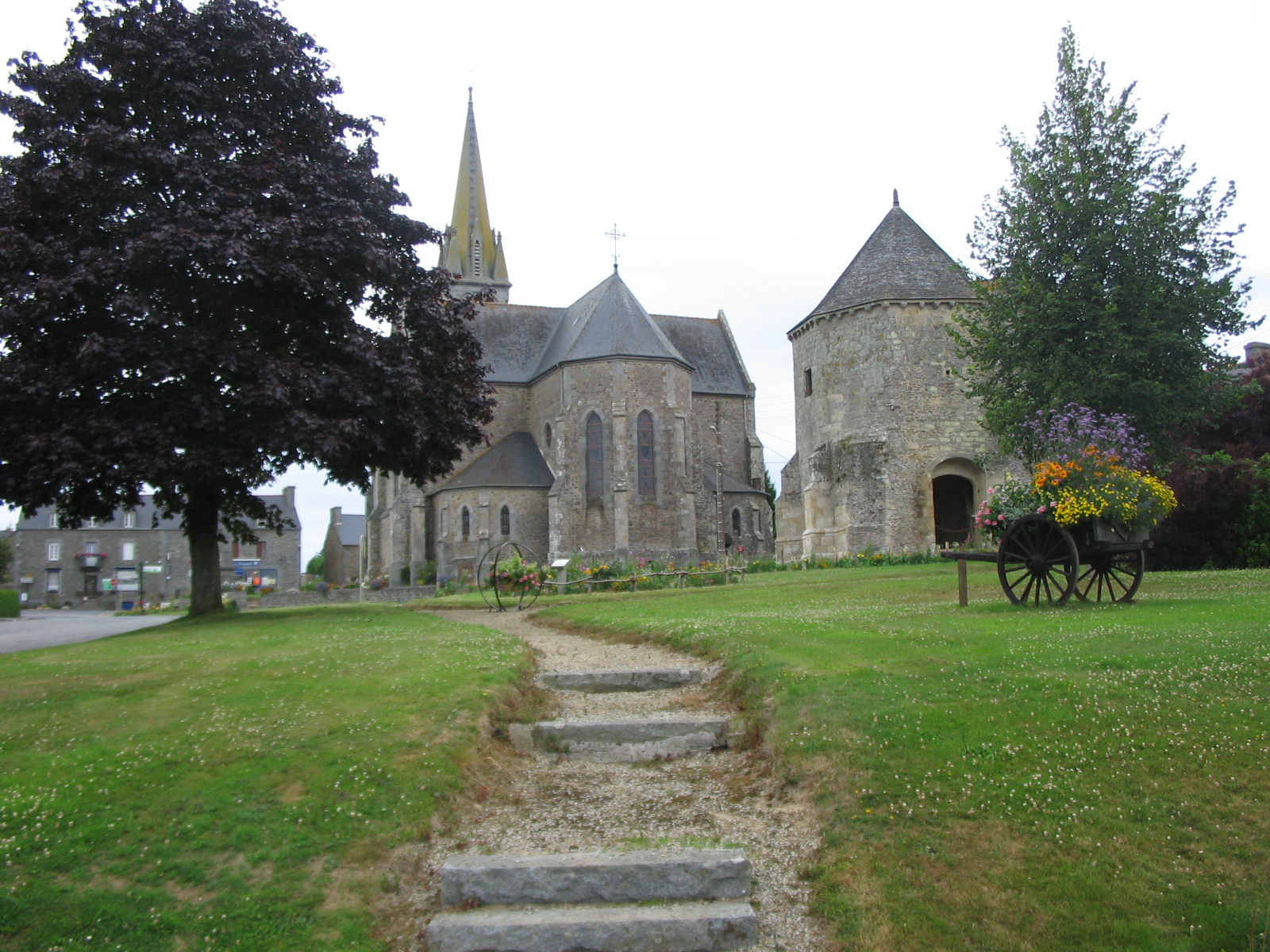

- Coat of arms
- Location of Langourla
- Location within France Location within Brittany
- Coordinates: 48°17′09″N 2°24′52″W
- Country: France
- Region: Brittany
- Department: Côtes-d'Armor
- Arrondissement: Dinan
- Canton: Plénée-Jugon
- Commune: Le Mené
- Area^{1}: 21.41 km^{2} (8.27 sq mi)
- Highest elevation: 218 m (715 ft)
- Lowest elevation: 127 m (417 ft)
- Population (2022): 536
  - Density: 25.0/km^{2} (64.8/sq mi)
- Time zone: UTC+01:00 (CET)
  - Summer (DST): UTC+02:00 (CEST)
- Postal code: 22330
- ^{1} French Land Register data, which excludes lakes, ponds, glaciers > 1 km^{2} (0.386 sq mi or 247 acres) and river estuaries.

Langourla (French pronunciation: [lɑ̃ɡuʁla]; Breton: Langourlae) is a former commune in the Côtes-d'Armor department of Brittany in north-western France. On 1 January 2016, it was merged into the new commune Le Mené.

== Population ==
Inhabitants of Langourla are called langourlaciens in French.

Historical population

| Year | Pop. | ±% p.a. |
|---|---|---|
| 1793 | 1,160 | — |
| 1800 | 1,142 | −0.22% |
| 1806 | 1,111 | −0.46% |
| 1821 | 1,155 | +0.26% |
| 1831 | 1,302 | +1.21% |
| 1836 | 1,300 | −0.03% |
| 1841 | 1,318 | +0.28% |
| 1846 | 1,370 | +0.78% |
| 1851 | 1,352 | −0.26% |
| 1856 | 1,274 | −1.18% |
| 1861 | 1,357 | +1.27% |
| 1866 | 1,469 | +1.60% |
| 1872 | 1,469 | +0.00% |
| 1876 | 1,586 | +1.93% |
| 1881 | 1,541 | −0.57% |
| 1886 | 1,548 | +0.09% |
| 1891 | 1,550 | +0.03% |
| 1896 | 1,579 | +0.37% |

| Year | Pop. | ±% p.a. |
|---|---|---|
| 1901 | 1,624 | +0.56% |
| 1906 | 1,588 | −0.45% |
| 1911 | 1,593 | +0.06% |
| 1921 | 1,351 | −1.63% |
| 1926 | 1,326 | −0.37% |
| 1931 | 1,302 | −0.36% |
| 1936 | 1,313 | +0.17% |
| 1946 | 1,187 | −1.00% |
| 1954 | 1,016 | −1.93% |
| 1962 | 967 | −0.62% |
| 1968 | 895 | −1.28% |
| 1975 | 765 | −2.22% |
| 1982 | 690 | −1.46% |
| 1990 | 631 | −1.11% |
| 1999 | 609 | −0.39% |
| 2006 | 631 | +0.51% |
| 2022 | 536 | −1.01% |

Source: EHESS and INSEE

== See also ==
- Communes of the Côtes-d'Armor department
