= Saint-Gouéno =

Saint-Gouéno Sant-Gouenoù
- Part of Le Mené
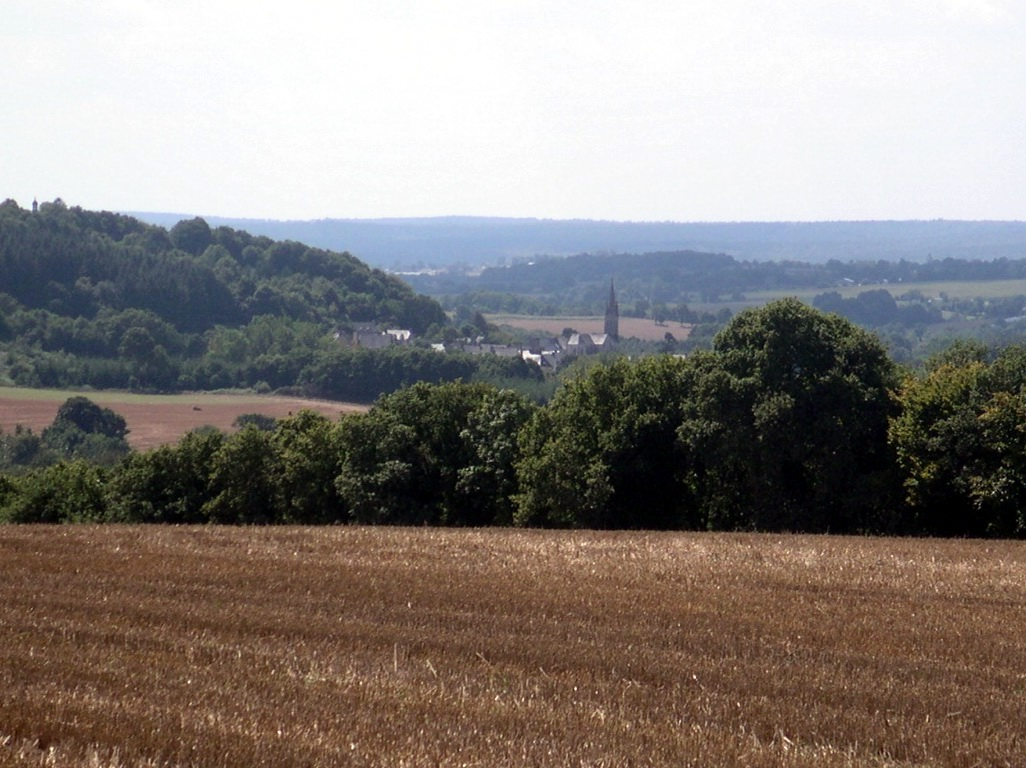
- Location of Saint-Gouéno
- Location within France Location within Brittany
- Coordinates: 48°16′06″N 2°34′02″W
- Country: France
- Region: Brittany
- Department: Côtes-d'Armor
- Arrondissement: Dinan
- Canton: Plénée-Jugon
- Commune: Le Mené
- Area^{1}: 20.08 km^{2} (7.75 sq mi)
- Highest elevation: 313 m (1,027 ft)
- Lowest elevation: 149 m (489 ft)
- Population (2023): 679
  - Density: 33.8/km^{2} (87.6/sq mi)
- Time zone: UTC+01:00 (CET)
  - Summer (DST): UTC+02:00 (CEST)
- Postal code: 22330
- ^{1} French Land Register data, which excludes lakes, ponds, glaciers > 1 km^{2} (0.386 sq mi or 247 acres) and river estuaries.

Saint-Gouéno (French pronunciation: [sɛ̃ ɡweno]; Breton: Sant-Gouenoù) is a former commune in the Côtes-d'Armor department of Brittany in northwestern France. On 1 January 2016, it was merged into the new commune Le Mené. Inhabitants of Saint-Gouéno are called gouénovais in French.

== See also ==
- Communes of the Côtes-d'Armor department
