= Saint-Jacut-du-Mené =

Saint-Jacut-du-Mené Sant-Yagu-ar-Menez
- Part of Le Mené
- Location of Saint-Jacut-du-Mené
- Location within France Location within Brittany
- Coordinates: 48°17′03″N 2°28′50″W
- Country: France
- Region: Brittany
- Department: Côtes-d'Armor
- Arrondissement: Dinan
- Canton: Plénée-Jugon
- Commune: Le Mené
- Area^{1}: 19.81 km^{2} (7.65 sq mi)
- Highest elevation: 296 m (971 ft)
- Lowest elevation: 150 m (490 ft)
- Population (2022): 729
  - Density: 36.8/km^{2} (95.3/sq mi)
- Time zone: UTC+01:00 (CET)
  - Summer (DST): UTC+02:00 (CEST)
- Postal code: 22330
- ^{1} French Land Register data, which excludes lakes, ponds, glaciers > 1 km^{2} (0.386 sq mi or 247 acres) and river estuaries.

Saint-Jacut-du-Mené (French pronunciation: [sɛ̃ ʒaky dy məne]; Breton: Sant-Yagu-ar-Menez) is a former commune in the Côtes-d'Armor département of Brittany in northwestern France. On 1 January 2016, it was merged into the new commune Le Mené.

Saint-Jacut-du-Mené is located in Central Brittany, equal distance from Saint-Brieuc, Rennes and Dinan. Its name comes from a 6th-century Saint called Jacut and the Breton word menez meaning "mount". The main employer is Kermené, subsidiary of E.Leclerc which specializes in meatworks.

== Population ==
Inhabitants of Saint-Jacut-du-Mené are called Jagüins in French.

Historical population

Year	Pop.	±% p.a.
1793	599	—
1800	598	−0.02%
1806	708	+2.85%
1821	616	−0.92%
1831	631	+0.24%
1836	684	+1.63%
1841	692	+0.23%
1846	773	+2.24%
1851	1,033	+5.97%
1856	1,039	+0.12%
1861	1,039	+0.00%
1866	1,116	+1.44%
1872	1,116	+0.00%
1876	1,300	+3.89%
1881	1,306	+0.09%
1886	1,349	+0.65%
1891	1,337	−0.18%

Year	Pop.	±% p.a.
1896	1,345	+0.12%
1901	1,364	+0.28%
1906	1,342	−0.32%
1911	1,276	−1.00%
1921	1,172	−0.85%
1926	1,056	−2.06%
1931	993	−1.22%
1936	1,006	+0.26%
1946	912	−0.98%
1954	776	−2.00%
1962	746	−0.49%
1968	725	−0.47%
1975	712	−0.26%
1982	677	−0.72%
1990	666	−0.20%
1999	716	+0.81%
2022	729	+0.08%

Source: EHESS and INSEE

== See also ==
- Communes of the Côtes-d'Armor department
