= Collinée =

Collinée Koedlinez
- Part of Le Mené
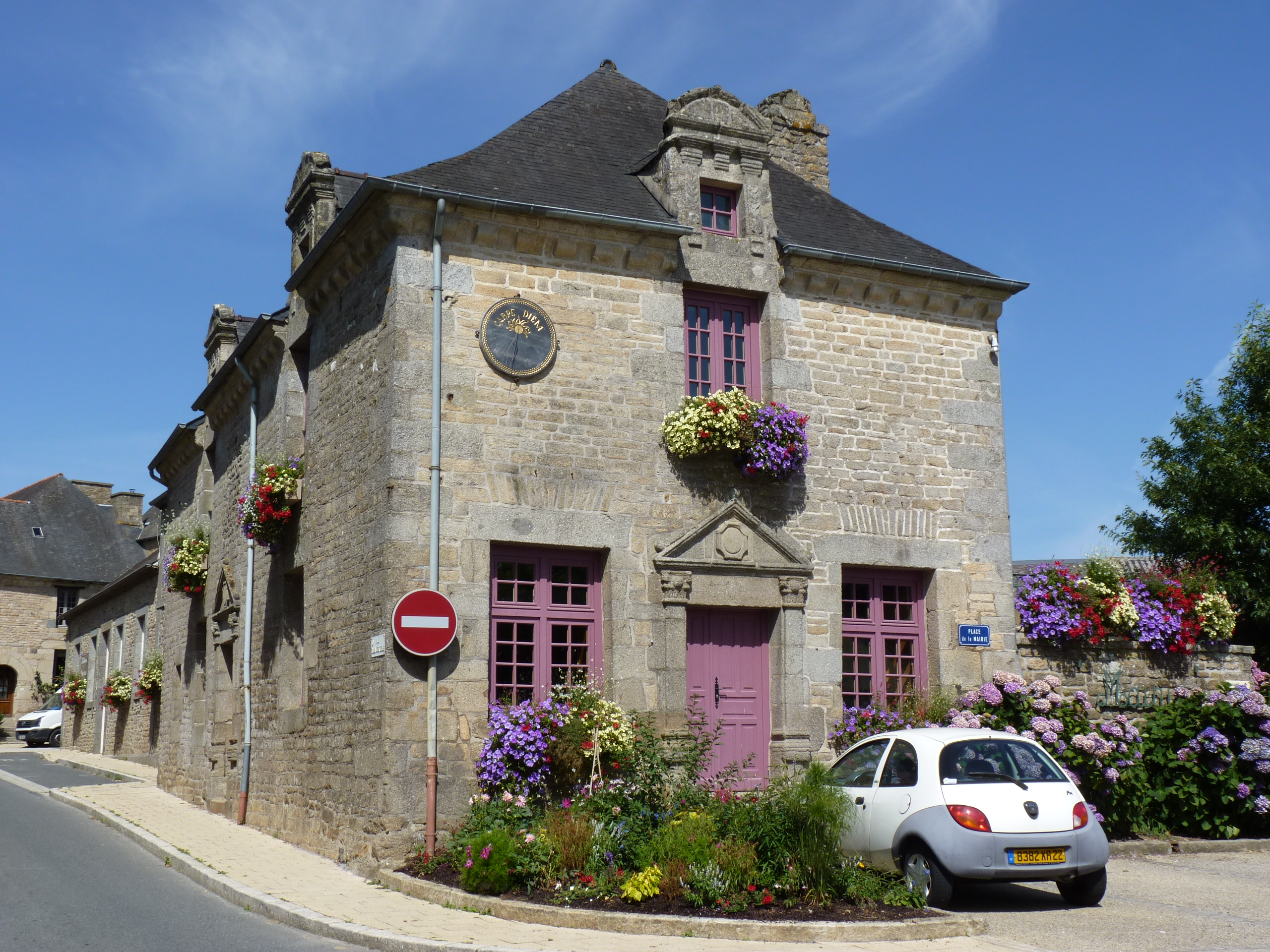
- Town hall

- Coat of arms
- Location of Collinée
- Location within France Location within Brittany
- Coordinates: 48°18′06″N 2°31′08″W
- Country: France
- Region: Brittany
- Department: Côtes-d'Armor
- Arrondissement: Dinan
- Canton: Plénée-Jugon
- Commune: Le Mené
- Area^{1}: 7.06 km^{2} (2.73 sq mi)
- Highest elevation: 305 m (1,001 ft)
- Lowest elevation: 163 m (535 ft)
- Population (2023): 970
  - Density: 140/km^{2} (360/sq mi)
- Time zone: UTC+01:00 (CET)
  - Summer (DST): UTC+02:00 (CEST)
- Postal code: 22330
- ^{1} French Land Register data, which excludes lakes, ponds, glaciers > 1 km^{2} (0.386 sq mi or 247 acres) and river estuaries.

Collinée (French pronunciation: [kɔline]; Breton: Koedlinez, Gallo: Coètneiz) was a commune in the Côtes-d'Armor department of Brittany in northwestern France. On 1 January 2016 (10 years ago), it was merged into the new commune Le Mené. Inhabitants of Collinée are called Collinéens in French.

== See also ==
- Communes of the Côtes-d'Armor department
