= Saint-Gilles-du-Mené =

Saint-Gilles-du-Mené Sant-Jili-ar-Menez
- Part of Le Mené
- Location of Saint-Gilles-du-Mené
- Location within France Location within Brittany
- Coordinates: 48°14′55″N 2°32′49″W
- Country: France
- Region: Brittany
- Department: Côtes-d'Armor
- Arrondissement: Dinan
- Canton: Plénée-Jugon
- Commune: Le Mené
- Area^{1}: 12.92 km^{2} (4.99 sq mi)
- Highest elevation: 297 m (974 ft)
- Lowest elevation: 150 m (490 ft)
- Population (2023): 473
  - Density: 36.6/km^{2} (94.8/sq mi)
- Time zone: UTC+01:00 (CET)
  - Summer (DST): UTC+02:00 (CEST)
- Postal code: 22330
- ^{1} French Land Register data, which excludes lakes, ponds, glaciers > 1 km^{2} (0.386 sq mi or 247 acres) and river estuaries.

Saint-Gilles-du-Mené (French pronunciation: [sɛ̃ ʒil dy məne]; Breton: Sant-Jili-ar-Menez; Gallo: Saent-Jill) is a former commune in the Côtes-d'Armor department of Brittany in northwestern France. On 1 January 2016, it was merged into the new commune Le Mené. Inhabitants of Saint-Gilles-du-Mené are called saint-gillois in French.

== See also ==
- Communes of the Côtes-d'Armor department
