= Penguily =

Penguily Pengilli
- Commune
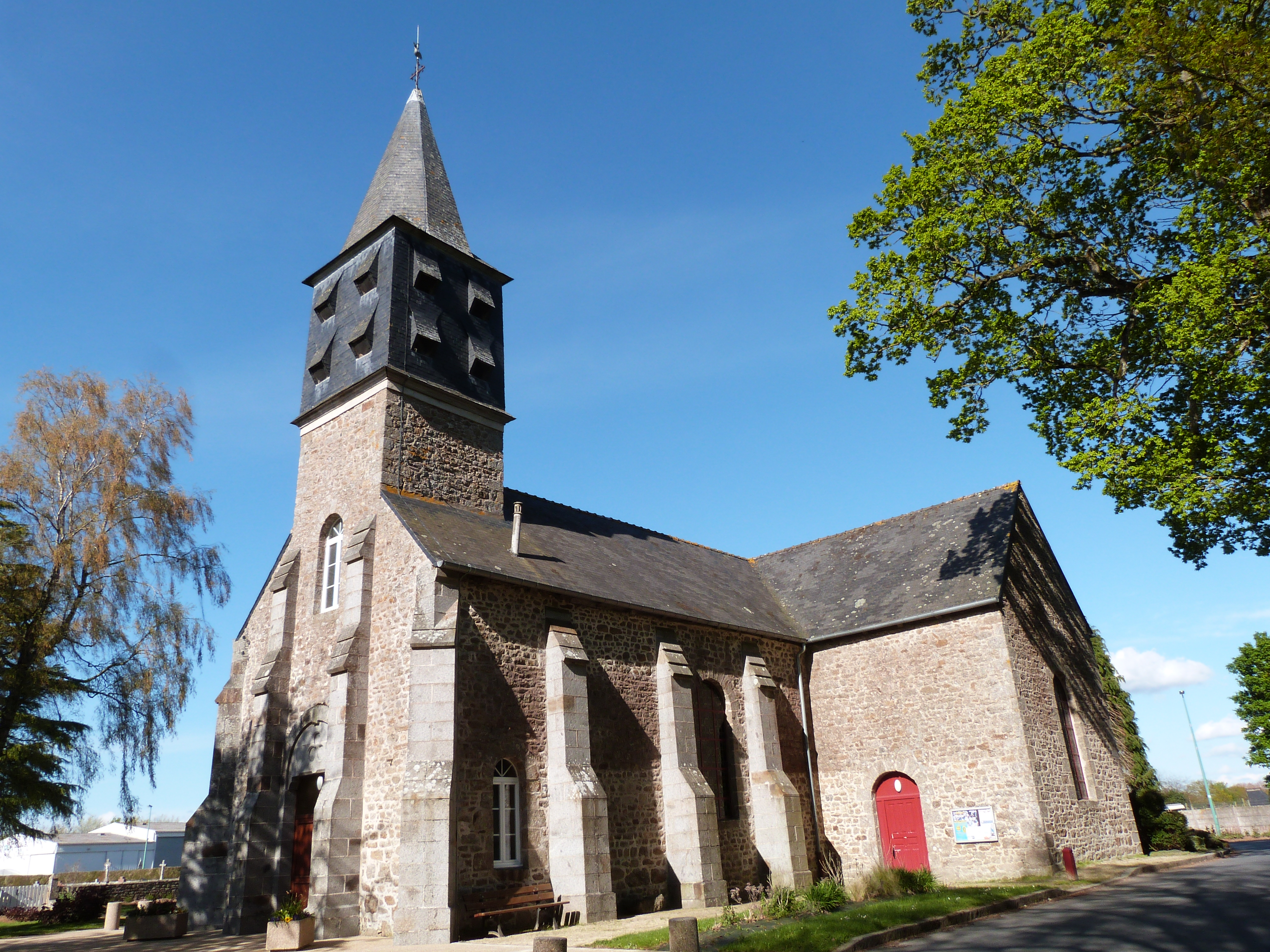
- The church of Saint-Théodule, in Penguily

- Coat of arms
- Location of Penguily
- Location within France Location within Brittany
- Coordinates: 48°22′22″N 2°29′37″W
- Country: France
- Region: Brittany
- Department: Côtes-d'Armor
- Arrondissement: Saint-Brieuc
- Canton: Plénée-Jugon
- Intercommunality: CA Lamballe Terre et Mer

Government
  - Mayor (2020–2026): Karine Clement
- Area^{1}: 10.49 km^{2} (4.05 sq mi)
- Highest elevation: 159 m (522 ft)
- Lowest elevation: 80 m (260 ft)
- Population (2023): 617
  - Density: 58.8/km^{2} (152/sq mi)
- Time zone: UTC+01:00 (CET)
  - Summer (DST): UTC+02:00 (CEST)
- INSEE/Postal code: 22165 /22510
- ^{1} French Land Register data, which excludes lakes, ponds, glaciers > 1 km^{2} (0.386 sq mi or 247 acres) and river estuaries.

Penguily (French pronunciation: [pɛ̃gili]; Breton: Pengilli; Gallo: Pengili) is a commune in the Côtes-d'Armor department of Brittany in northwestern France.

== Population ==
Historical population
Year	Pop.	±% p.a.
1968	371	—
1975	352	−0.75%
1982	334	−0.75%
1990	363	+1.05%
1999	422	+1.69%
2007	567	+3.76%
2012	625	+1.97%
2017	609	−0.52%
2023	617	+0.22%
Source: INSEE

Inhabitants of Penguily are called penguilais in French.

== See also ==
- Communes of the Côtes-d'Armor department
