= Saint-Glen =

Saint-Glen Sant-Glenn
- Commune
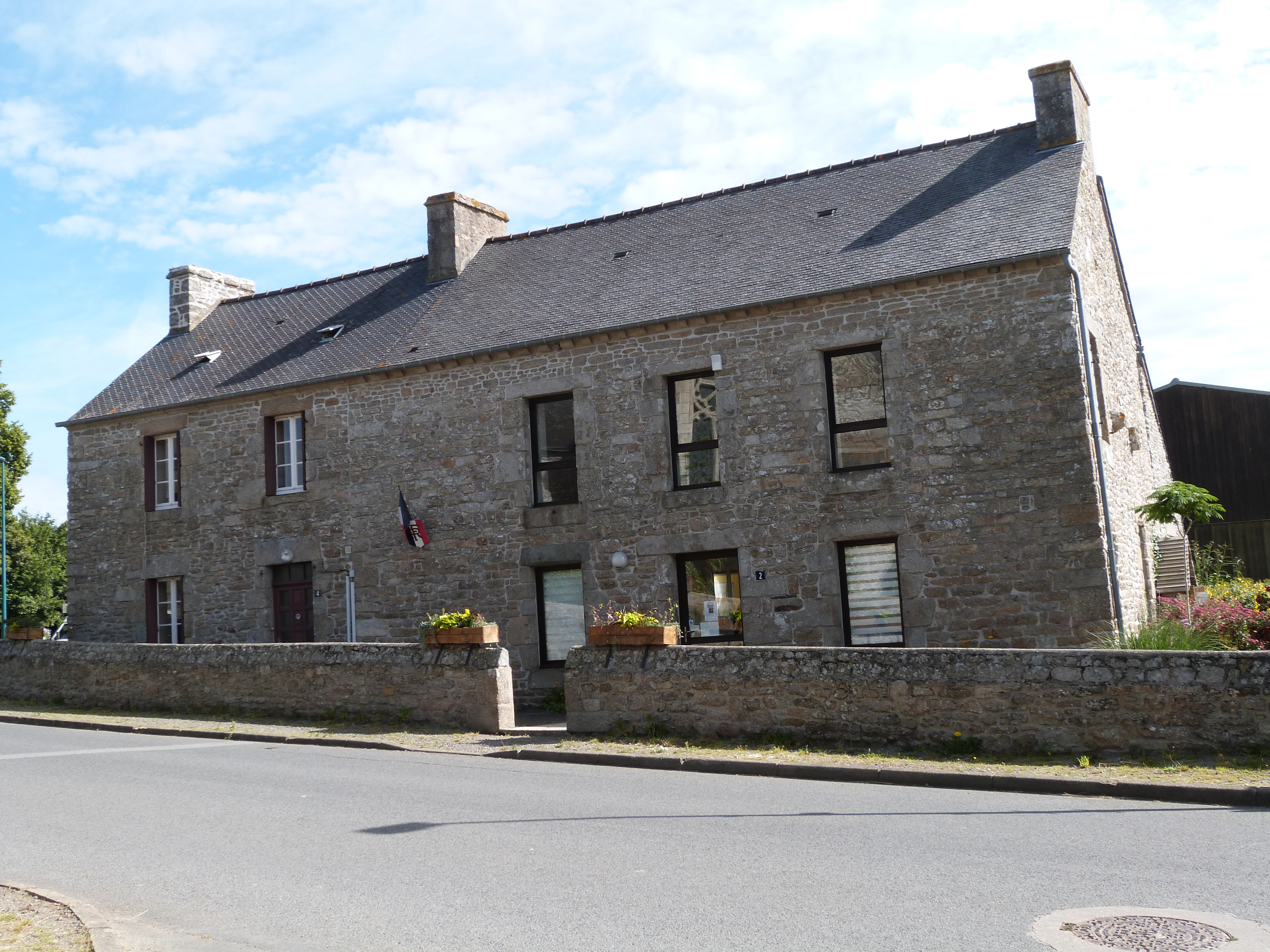
- The town hall of Saint-Glen

- Coat of arms
- Location of Saint-Glen
- Location within France Location within Brittany
- Coordinates: 48°21′37″N 2°31′20″W
- Country: France
- Region: Brittany
- Department: Côtes-d'Armor
- Arrondissement: Saint-Brieuc
- Canton: Plénée-Jugon
- Intercommunality: CA Lamballe Terre et Mer

Government
  - Mayor (2020–2026): Jean-François Cordon
- Area^{1}: 11.51 km^{2} (4.44 sq mi)
- Highest elevation: 311 m (1,020 ft)
- Lowest elevation: 104 m (341 ft)
- Population (2023): 664
  - Density: 57.7/km^{2} (149/sq mi)
- Time zone: UTC+01:00 (CET)
  - Summer (DST): UTC+02:00 (CEST)
- INSEE/Postal code: 22296 /22510
- ^{1} French Land Register data, which excludes lakes, ponds, glaciers > 1 km^{2} (0.386 sq mi or 247 acres) and river estuaries.

Saint-Glen (French pronunciation: [sɛ̃ ɡlɛ̃]; Breton: Sant-Glenn; Gallo: Saent-Glen) is a commune in the Côtes-d'Armor department of Brittany in northwestern France.

== Population ==
People from Saint-Glen are called Glénois in French.

== See also ==
- Communes of the Côtes-d'Armor department
