= Canton of Plaintel =

Coordinates: 48.41°N 2.82°W

The canton of Plaintel is an administrative division of the Côtes-d'Armor department, northwestern France. It was created at the French canton reorganisation which came into effect in March 2015. Its seat is in Plaintel.

It consists of the following communes:

1. Le Bodéo
2. Hénon
3. Moncontour
4. Plaintel
5. Plémy
6. Plœuc-l'Hermitage
7. Quessoy
8. Saint-Carreuc
9. Trédaniel
