= Quintenic =

Quintenic Kistenid
- Commune
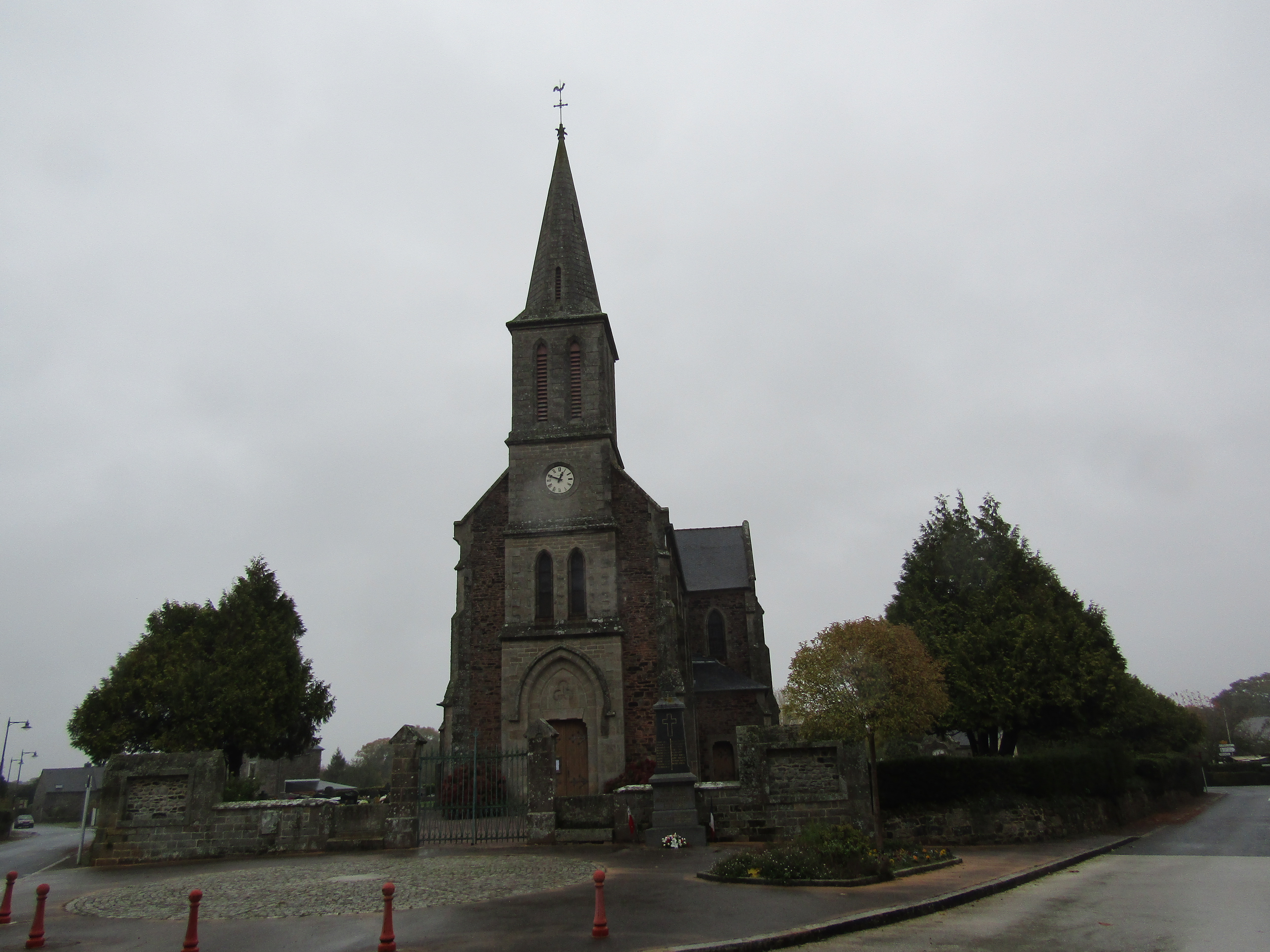
- The church of Saint-Pierre, in Quintenic
- Location of Quintenic
- Location within France Location within Brittany
- Coordinates: 48°30′58″N 2°25′36″W
- Country: France
- Region: Brittany
- Department: Côtes-d'Armor
- Arrondissement: Saint-Brieuc
- Canton: Lamballe-Armor
- Intercommunality: CA Lamballe Terre et Mer

Government
  - Mayor (2022–2026): Jérémy Boulard
- Area^{1}: 7.50 km^{2} (2.90 sq mi)
- Highest elevation: 106 m (348 ft)
- Lowest elevation: 44 m (144 ft)
- Population (2023): 363
  - Density: 48.4/km^{2} (125/sq mi)
- Time zone: UTC+01:00 (CET)
  - Summer (DST): UTC+02:00 (CEST)
- INSEE/Postal code: 22261 /22400
- ^{1} French Land Register data, which excludes lakes, ponds, glaciers > 1 km^{2} (0.386 sq mi or 247 acres) and river estuaries.

Quintenic (French pronunciation: [kɛ̃tnik]; Breton: Kistenid; Gallo: Qeintenit) is a commune in Côtes-d'Armor, a department of Brittany in northwestern France.

== Geography ==
=== Climate ===
Quintenic has an oceanic climate (Köppen climate classification Cfb). The average annual temperature in Quintenic is 11.3 °C (52.3 °F). The average annual rainfall is 743.4 mm (29.27 in) with November as the wettest month. The temperatures are highest on average in August, at around 17.5 °C (63.5 °F), and lowest in January, at around 5.8 °C (42.4 °F). The highest temperature ever recorded in Quintenic was 39.7 °C (103.5 °F) on 5 August 2003; the coldest temperature ever recorded was −14.7 °C (5.5 °F) on 19 February 1985.

Climate data for Quintenic (1981–2010 averages, extremes 1987−present)
Month	Jan	Feb	Mar	Apr	May	Jun	Jul	Aug	Sep	Oct	Nov	Dec	Year
Record high °C (°F)	16.3 (61.3)	21.0 (69.8)	23.7 (74.7)	26.4 (79.5)	29.0 (84.2)	33.4 (92.1)	37.3 (99.1)	39.7 (103.5)	31.7 (89.1)	30.6 (87.1)	20.9 (69.6)	17.5 (63.5)	39.7 (103.5)
Mean daily maximum °C (°F)	8.6 (47.5)	9.5 (49.1)	11.9 (53.4)	13.9 (57.0)	17.3 (63.1)	20.2 (68.4)	22.5 (72.5)	22.6 (72.7)	20.3 (68.5)	16.4 (61.5)	12.0 (53.6)	9.2 (48.6)	15.4 (59.7)
Daily mean °C (°F)	5.8 (42.4)	6.2 (43.2)	8.0 (46.4)	9.4 (48.9)	12.7 (54.9)	15.3 (59.5)	17.3 (63.1)	17.5 (63.5)	15.3 (59.5)	12.5 (54.5)	8.7 (47.7)	6.3 (43.3)	11.3 (52.3)
Mean daily minimum °C (°F)	3.0 (37.4)	2.9 (37.2)	4.1 (39.4)	5.0 (41.0)	8.0 (46.4)	10.4 (50.7)	12.2 (54.0)	12.4 (54.3)	10.3 (50.5)	8.5 (47.3)	5.5 (41.9)	3.4 (38.1)	7.2 (45.0)
Record low °C (°F)	−14.7 (5.5)	−14.7 (5.5)	−7.1 (19.2)	−4.3 (24.3)	−1.8 (28.8)	1.4 (34.5)	4.2 (39.6)	4.4 (39.9)	1.0 (33.8)	−5.5 (22.1)	−6.2 (20.8)	−8.2 (17.2)	−14.7 (5.5)
Average precipitation mm (inches)	65.9 (2.59)	60.0 (2.36)	55.2 (2.17)	57.3 (2.26)	60.1 (2.37)	49.6 (1.95)	48.1 (1.89)	45.2 (1.78)	65.1 (2.56)	75.2 (2.96)	84.1 (3.31)	77.6 (3.06)	743.4 (29.27)
Average precipitation days (≥ 1.0 mm)	12.7	11.7	10.9	10.8	9.6	7.6	7.9	8.2	9.4	12.4	14.5	13.7	129.5
Source: Météo France

== See also ==
- Communes of the Côtes-d'Armor department
