= Noyal =

Noyal Noual-Pentevr
- Commune
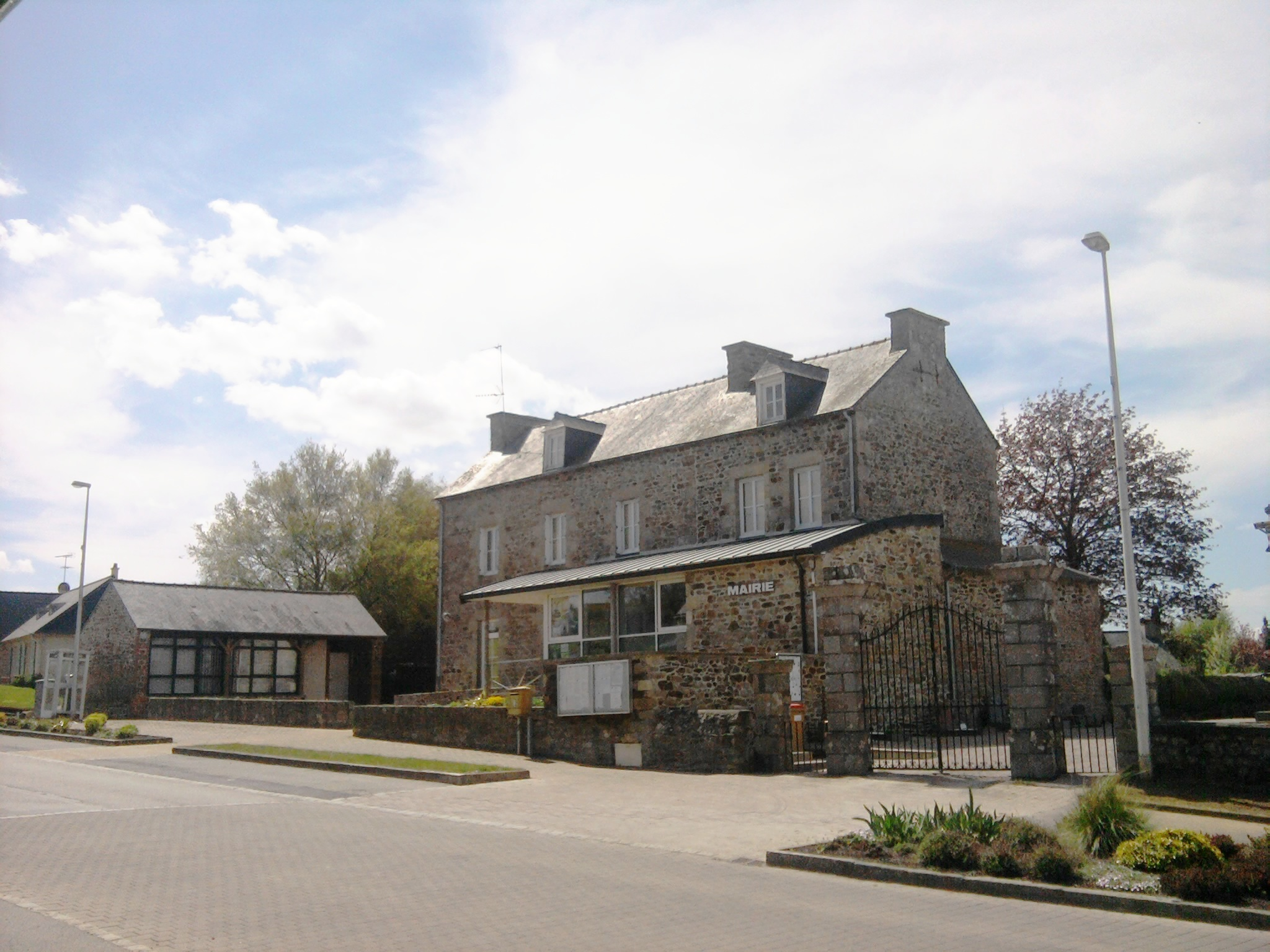
- The town hall of Noyal
- Location of Noyal
- Location within France Location within Brittany
- Coordinates: 48°26′54″N 2°29′09″W
- Country: France
- Region: Brittany
- Department: Côtes-d'Armor
- Arrondissement: Saint-Brieuc
- Canton: Lamballe-Armor
- Intercommunality: CA Lamballe Terre et Mer

Government
  - Mayor (2020–2026): Philippe Hello
- Area^{1}: 6.80 km^{2} (2.63 sq mi)
- Highest elevation: 95 m (312 ft)
- Lowest elevation: 52 m (171 ft)
- Population (2023): 985
  - Density: 145/km^{2} (375/sq mi)
- Time zone: UTC+01:00 (CET)
  - Summer (DST): UTC+02:00 (CEST)
- INSEE/Postal code: 22160 /22400
- ^{1} French Land Register data, which excludes lakes, ponds, glaciers > 1 km^{2} (0.386 sq mi or 247 acres) and river estuaries.

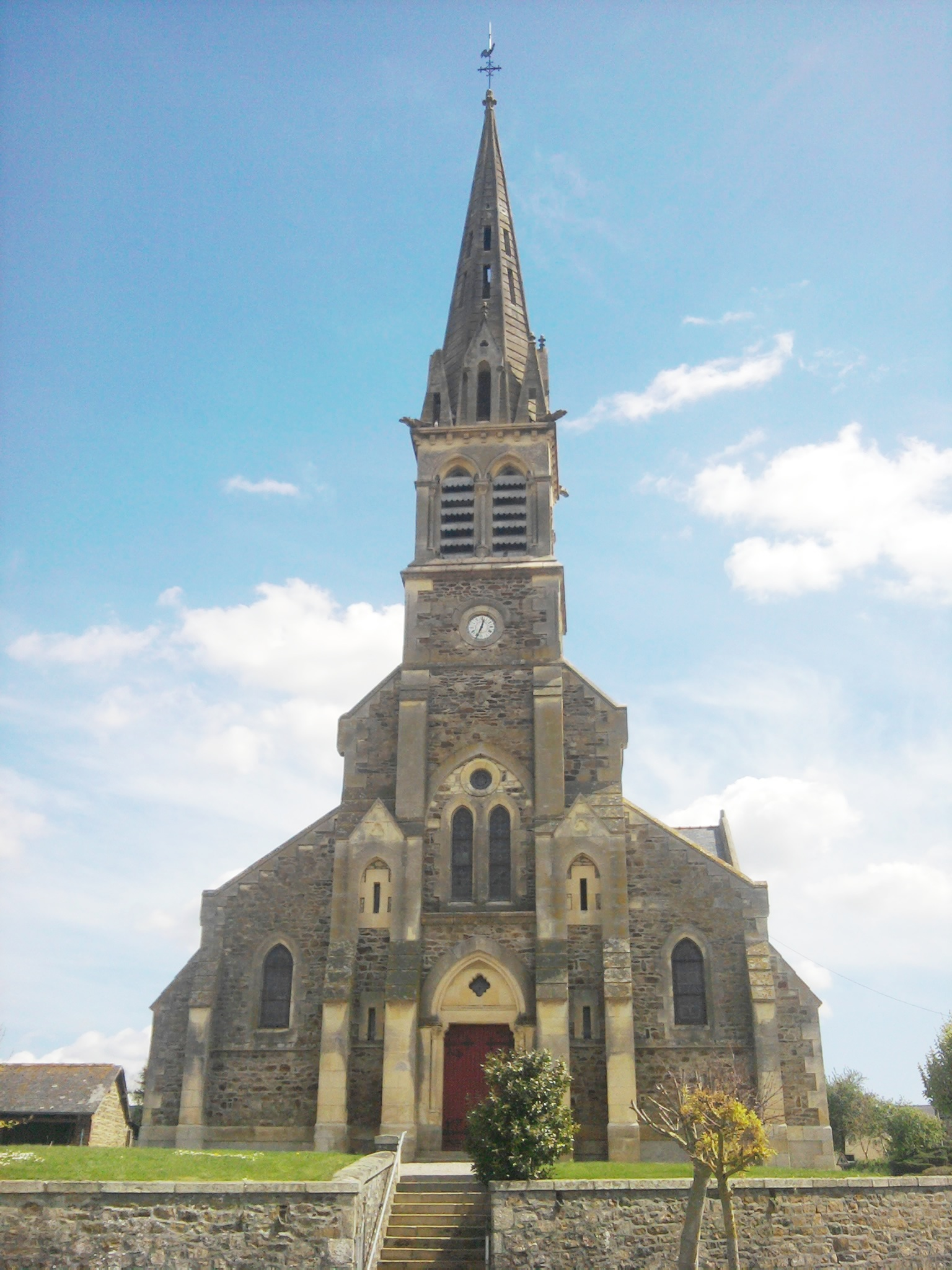

Noyal (French pronunciation: [nwajal]; Breton: Noual-Pentevr; Gallo: Nóyau) is a commune in the Côtes-d'Armor department of Brittany in northwestern France.

== Population ==
Historical population
Year	Pop.	±% p.a.
1968	463	—
1975	508	+1.33%
1982	616	+2.79%
1990	754	+2.56%
1999	770	+0.23%
2007	801	+0.49%
2012	848	+1.15%
2017	908	+1.38%
2023	985	+1.37%
Source: INSEE

The inhabitants of Noyal are known in French as noyalais.

== See also ==
- Communes of the Côtes-d'Armor department
