= Plessala =

Plessala Plesala
- Part of Le Mené
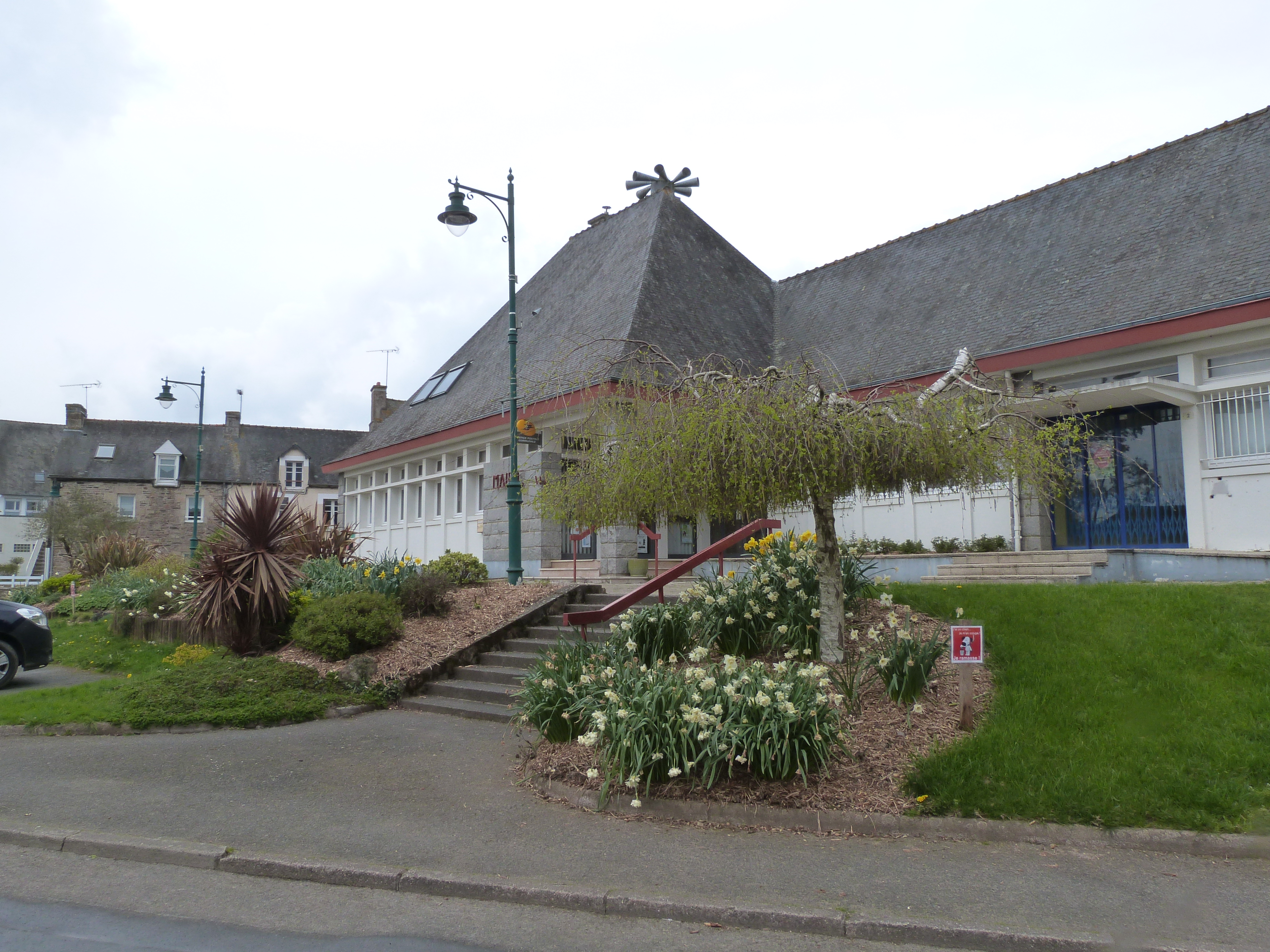
- Town hall
- Location of Plessala
- Location within France Location within Brittany
- Coordinates: 48°16′36″N 2°37′05″W
- Country: France
- Region: Brittany
- Department: Côtes-d'Armor
- Arrondissement: Saint-Brieuc
- Canton: Plénée-Jugon
- Commune: Le Mené
- Area^{1}: 51.45 km^{2} (19.86 sq mi)
- Highest elevation: 337 m (1,106 ft)
- Lowest elevation: 95 m (312 ft)
- Population (2022): 1,744
  - Density: 33.90/km^{2} (87.79/sq mi)
- Time zone: UTC+01:00 (CET)
  - Summer (DST): UTC+02:00 (CEST)
- Postal code: 22330
- ^{1} French Land Register data, which excludes lakes, ponds, glaciers > 1 km^{2} (0.386 sq mi or 247 acres) and river estuaries.

Plessala (French pronunciation: [plɛsala]; Breton: Plesala) is a former commune in the Côtes-d'Armor department of Brittany in northwestern France. On 1 January 2016, it was merged into the new commune Le Mené.

== Population ==
People from Plessala are called plessaliens in French.

Historical population
Year	Pop.	±% p.a.
1962	2,233	—
1968	2,071	−1.25%
1975	2,055	−0.11%
1982	1,979	−0.54%
1990	1,882	−0.63%
1999	1,821	−0.37%
2006	1,798	−0.18%
2022	1,744	−0.19%
Source: EHESS and INSEE

== See also ==
- Communes of the Côtes-d'Armor department
