= Le Mené =

- Commune
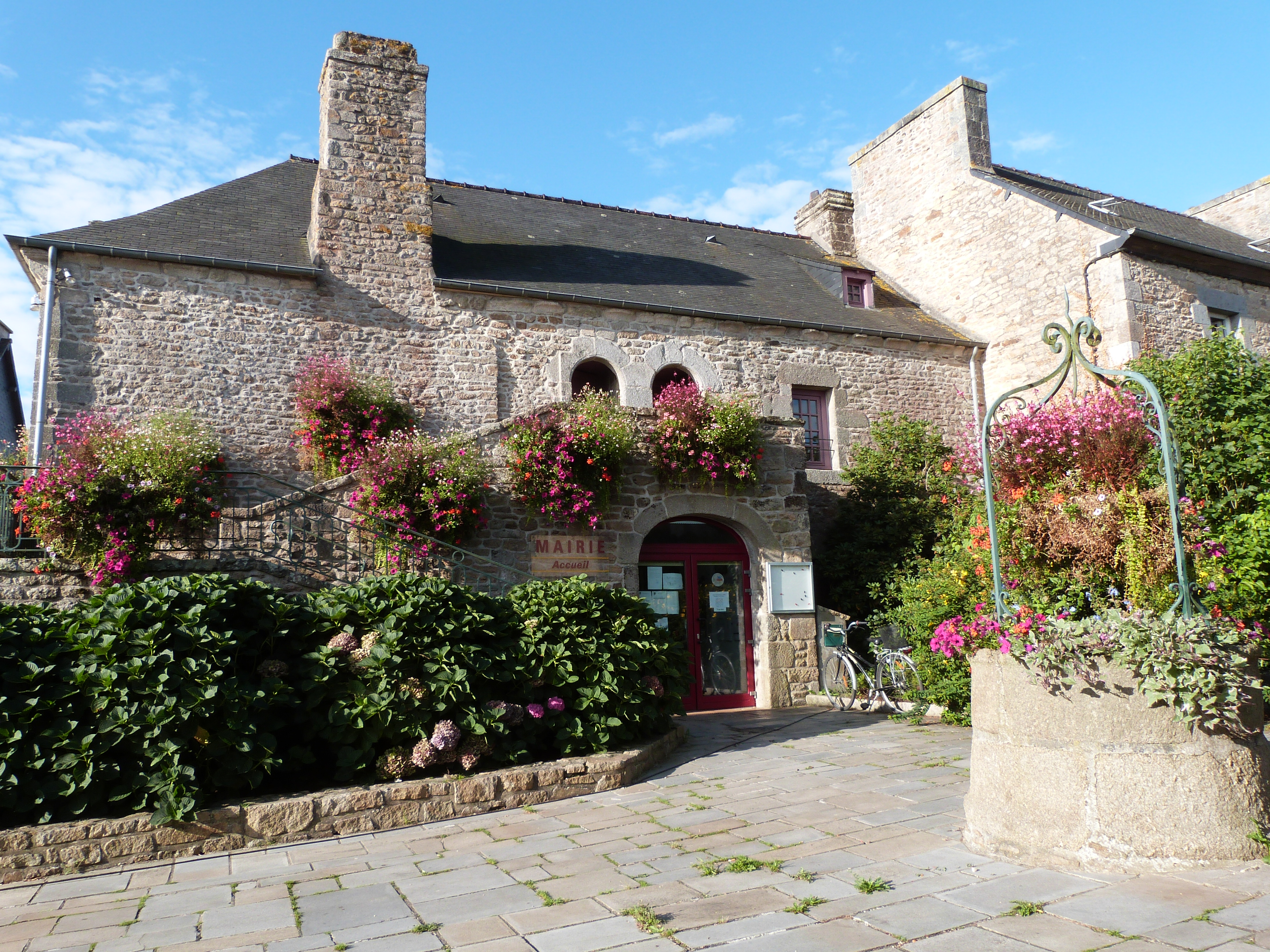
- The town hall of Le Mené
- Location of Le Mené
- Location within France Location within Brittany
- Coordinates: 48°18′07″N 2°31′08″W
- Country: France
- Region: Brittany
- Department: Côtes-d'Armor
- Arrondissement: Saint-Brieuc
- Canton: Plénée-Jugon

Government
  - Mayor (2020–2026): Gérard Daboudet
- Area^{1}: 163.23 km^{2} (63.02 sq mi)
- Population (2023): 6,556
  - Density: 40.16/km^{2} (104.0/sq mi)
- Time zone: UTC+01:00 (CET)
  - Summer (DST): UTC+02:00 (CEST)
- INSEE/Postal code: 22046 /22330
- ^{1} French Land Register data, which excludes lakes, ponds, glaciers > 1 km^{2} (0.386 sq mi or 247 acres) and river estuaries.

Le Mené (French pronunciation: [lə məne]; Breton: Ar Menez) is a commune in the Côtes-d'Armor department of western France. The municipality was established on 1 January 2016 and consists of the former communes of Collinée, Le Gouray, Langourla, Plessala, Saint-Gilles-du-Mené, Saint-Gouéno and Saint-Jacut-du-Mené.

== Population ==
Population data refer to the commune in its geography as of January 2025.

Historical population
Year	Pop.	±% p.a.
1968	6,840	—
1975	6,604	−0.50%
1982	6,306	−0.66%
1990	6,241	−0.13%
1999	6,136	−0.19%
2007	6,322	+0.37%
2012	6,453	+0.41%
2017	6,417	−0.11%
2023	6,556	+0.36%
Source: INSEE

== See also ==
- Communes of the Côtes-d'Armor department
