= Landéhen =

Landéhen Landehen
- Commune
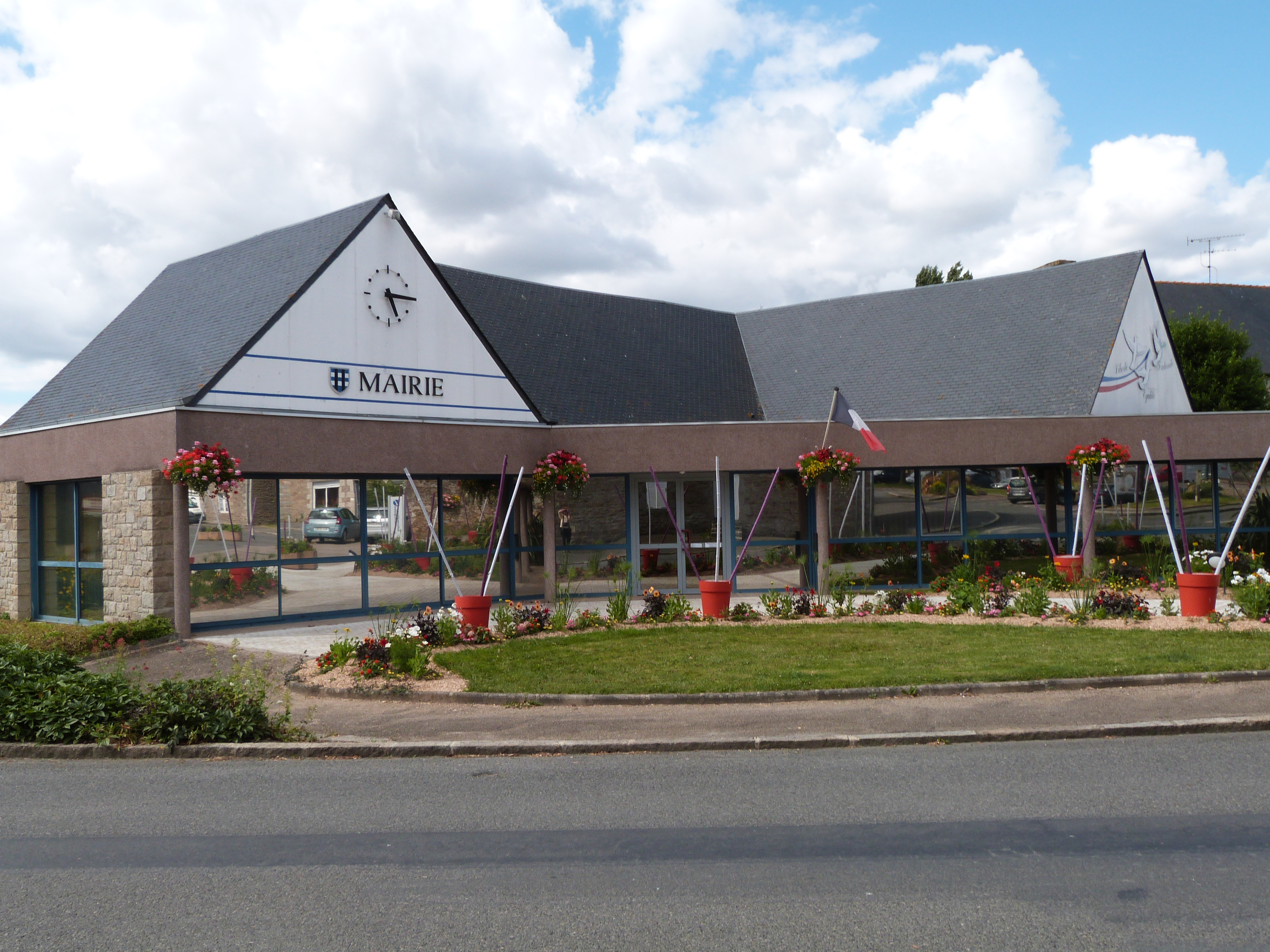
- The town hall of Landéhen

- Coat of arms
- Location of Landéhen
- Location within France Location within Brittany
- Coordinates: 48°25′45″N 2°32′22″W
- Country: France
- Region: Brittany
- Department: Côtes-d'Armor
- Arrondissement: Saint-Brieuc
- Canton: Lamballe-Armor
- Intercommunality: CA Lamballe Terre et Mer

Government
  - Mayor (2020–2026): Nathalie Travert Le Roux
- Area^{1}: 11.80 km^{2} (4.56 sq mi)
- Highest elevation: 113 m (371 ft)
- Lowest elevation: 58 m (190 ft)
- Population (2023): 1,444
  - Density: 122.4/km^{2} (316.9/sq mi)
- Time zone: UTC+01:00 (CET)
  - Summer (DST): UTC+02:00 (CEST)
- INSEE/Postal code: 22098 /22400
- ^{1} French Land Register data, which excludes lakes, ponds, glaciers > 1 km^{2} (0.386 sq mi or 247 acres) and river estuaries.

Landéhen (French pronunciation: [lɑ̃deɛ̃]; Breton: Landehen) is a commune in the Côtes-d'Armor department of Brittany in northwestern France.

== Population ==
Historical population
Year	Pop.	±% p.a.
1968	742	—
1975	750	+0.15%
1982	844	+1.70%
1990	941	+1.37%
1999	986	+0.52%
2007	1,251	+3.02%
2012	1,363	+1.73%
2017	1,415	+0.75%
2023	1,444	+0.34%
Source: INSEE

People from Landéhen are called landéhennais in French.

== See also ==
- Communes of the Côtes-d'Armor department
