= Hénansal =

Hénansal Henant-Sal
- Commune
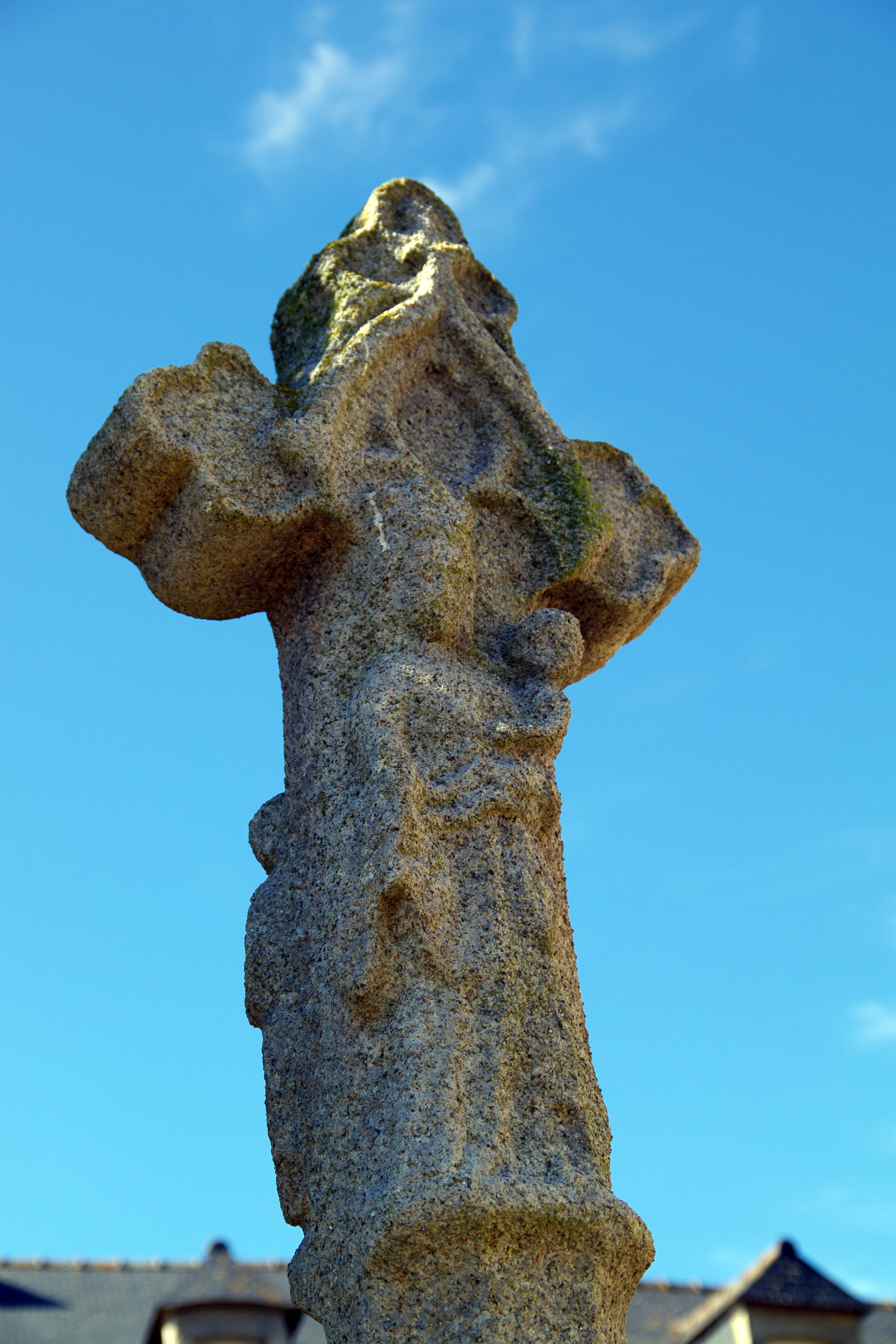
- The 11th century cemetery cross

- Coat of arms
- Location of Hénansal
- Location within France Location within Brittany
- Coordinates: 48°32′33″N 2°25′59″W
- Country: France
- Region: Brittany
- Department: Côtes-d'Armor
- Arrondissement: Saint-Brieuc
- Canton: Lamballe-Armor
- Intercommunality: CA Lamballe Terre et Mer

Government
  - Mayor (2020–2026): Sylvie Hervo
- Area^{1}: 29.00 km^{2} (11.20 sq mi)
- Highest elevation: 123 m (404 ft)
- Lowest elevation: 32 m (105 ft)
- Population (2023): 1,294
  - Density: 44.62/km^{2} (115.6/sq mi)
- Time zone: UTC+01:00 (CET)
  - Summer (DST): UTC+02:00 (CEST)
- INSEE/Postal code: 22077 /22400
- ^{1} French Land Register data, which excludes lakes, ponds, glaciers > 1 km^{2} (0.386 sq mi or 247 acres) and river estuaries.

Hénansal (French pronunciation: [enɑ̃sal]; Breton: Henant-Sal; Gallo: Henaunt-Sau) is a commune in the Côtes-d'Armor department of Brittany in northwestern France.

== Population ==
Historical population
Year	Pop.	±% p.a.
1968	1,016	—
1975	1,012	−0.06%
1982	1,007	−0.07%
1990	936	−0.91%
1999	935	−0.01%
2007	1,031	+1.23%
2012	1,148	+2.17%
2017	1,173	+0.43%
2023	1,294	+1.65%
Source: INSEE

Inhabitants of Hénansal are called hénansalais in French.

== See also ==
- Communes of the Côtes-d'Armor department
