= Trédaniel =

Trédaniel Trezeniel
- Commune
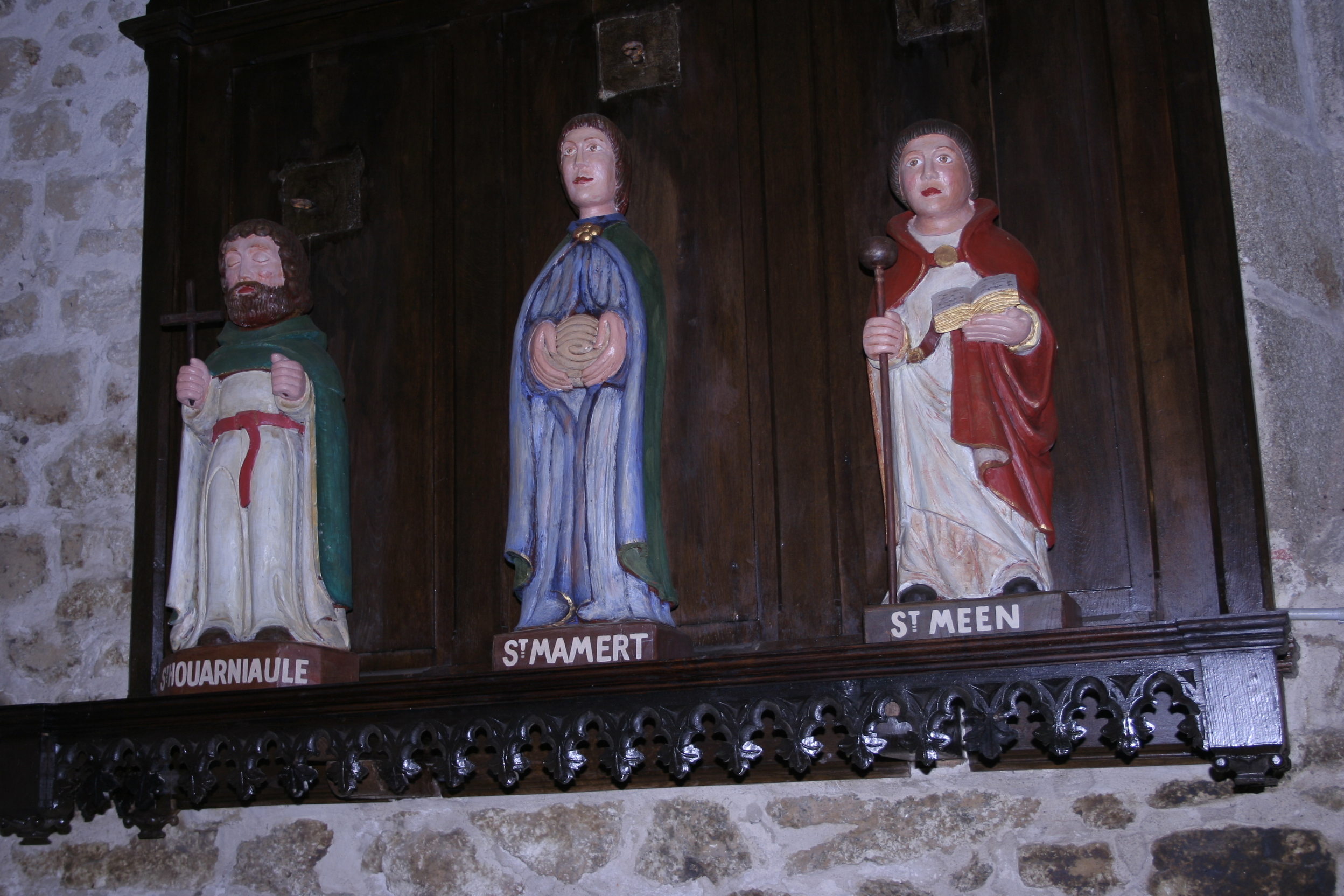
- Polychromatic sculptures in Notre Dame de Haut
- Location of Trédaniel
- Location within France Location within Brittany
- Coordinates: 48°21′31″N 2°37′04″W
- Country: France
- Region: Brittany
- Department: Côtes-d'Armor
- Arrondissement: Saint-Brieuc
- Canton: Plaintel
- Intercommunality: CA Lamballe Terre et Mer

Government
  - Mayor (2020–2026): Christophe Robin
- Area^{1}: 15.92 km^{2} (6.15 sq mi)
- Highest elevation: 331 m (1,086 ft)
- Lowest elevation: 86 m (282 ft)
- Population (2023): 906
  - Density: 56.9/km^{2} (147/sq mi)
- Time zone: UTC+01:00 (CET)
  - Summer (DST): UTC+02:00 (CEST)
- INSEE/Postal code: 22346 /22510
- ^{1} French Land Register data, which excludes lakes, ponds, glaciers > 1 km^{2} (0.386 sq mi or 247 acres) and river estuaries.

Trédaniel (French pronunciation: [tʁedanjɛl]; Breton: Trezeniel) is a commune in the Côtes-d'Armor department of Brittany in northwestern France.

== Population ==
Historical population
Year	Pop.	±% p.a.
1968	592	—
1975	636	+1.03%
1982	719	+1.77%
1990	747	+0.48%
1999	856	+1.52%
2007	961	+1.46%
2012	977	+0.33%
2017	926	−1.07%
2023	906	−0.36%
Source: INSEE

Inhabitants of Trédaniel are called trédanielais in French.

== See also ==
- Communes of the Côtes-d'Armor department

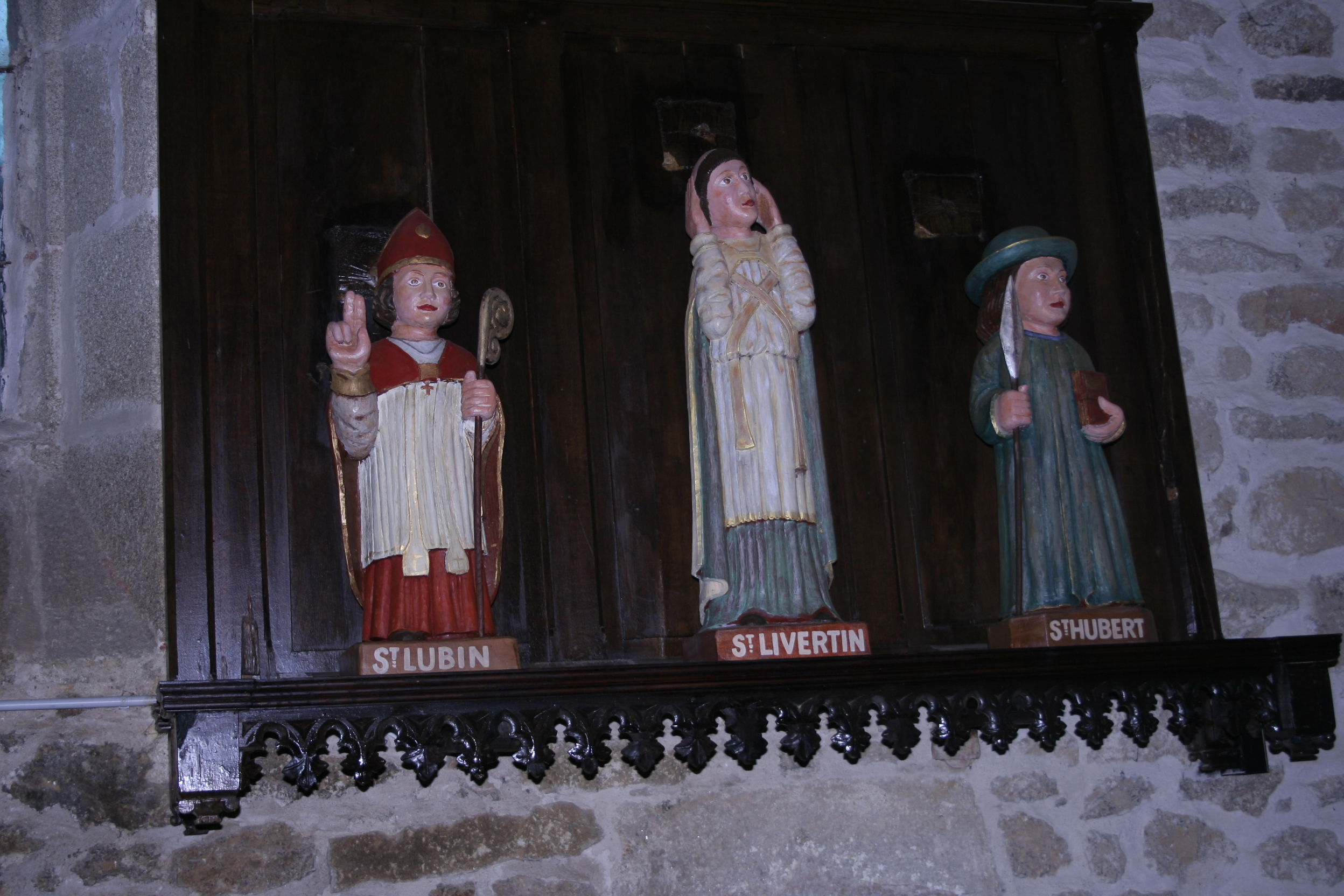
Polychromatic sculptures in Notre Dame de Haut nearby

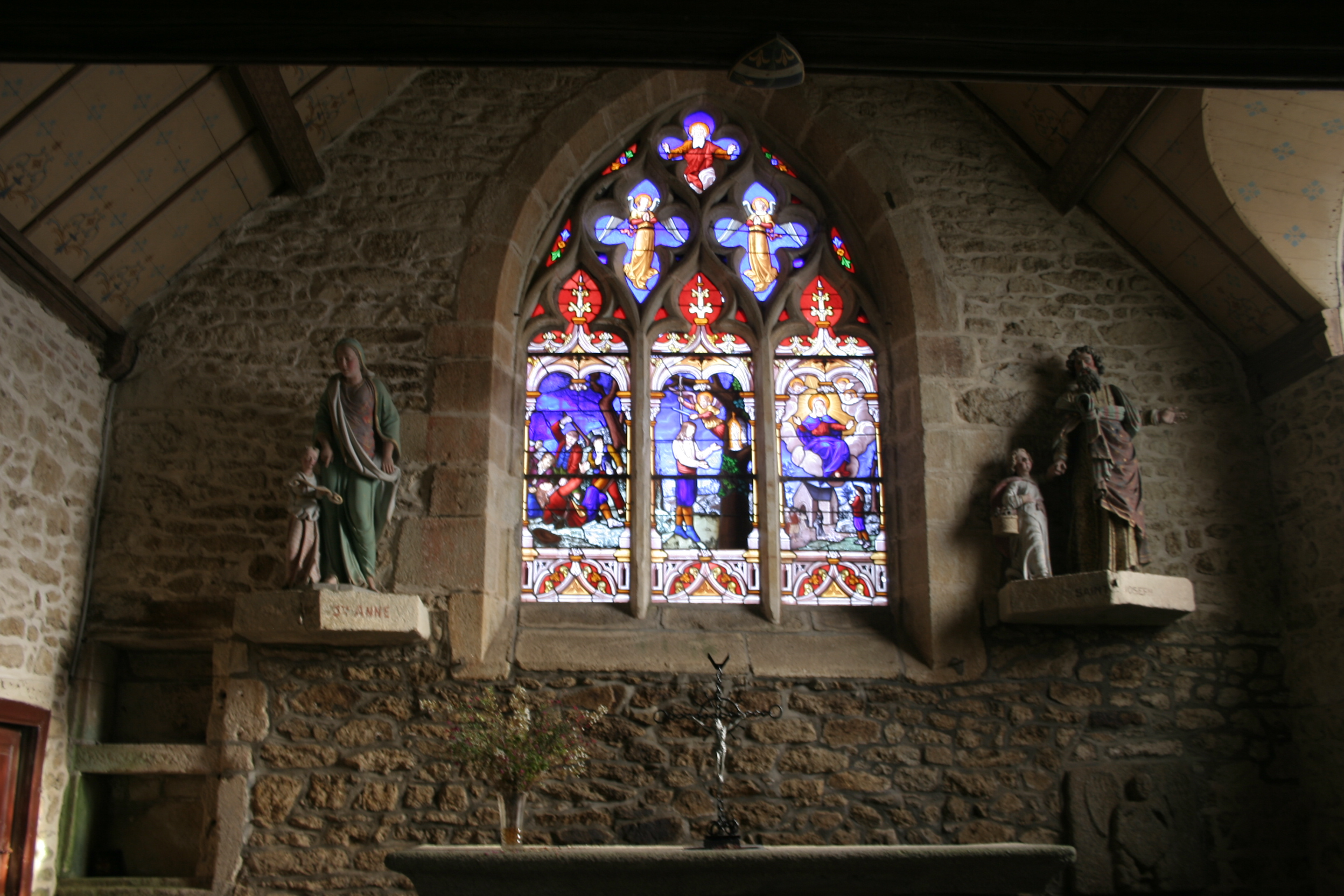
Notre Dame de Haut
