= Marquis de Sade (band) =

French post-punk band

- Origin: Rennes, Brittany, France
- Genres: Post-punk; cold wave
- Years active: 1977–1981
- Past members: Philippe Pascal (†); Frank Darcel (†); Anzia; Christian Dargelos; Pierre Thomas; Thierry Alexandre; Eric Morinière; Philippe Herpin; Daniel Pabœuf

Marquis de Sade were a French post-punk band, active between 1977 and 1981. In their time, the group produced two studio albums, 1979's Dantzig Twist and 1981's Rue de Siam.

== Background ==
AllMusic describe the band's sound as "witty, dark and exciting music comparable to Howard Devoto's Magazine, mixing post-punk and new wave with a drop of funk to produce an intensely nervous, modern, yet romantic sound, often copied but rarely equaled." Billboard called the band's two albums "highly influential".

== Discography ==
Studio albums

- Dantzig Twist (1979)
- Rue de Siam (1981)

Singles

- "Conrad Veidt" (1978)
- "Air Tight Cell" (1978)
- "Rhythmiques" (1980)
- "Wanda's Loving Boy" (1981)
