= Dantzig Twist =

Studio album by Marquis de Sade
- Released: 1979
- Studio: Studio DB, Melesse, France
- Genre: Post-punk
- Label: Pathé-Marconi
- Producer: Thierry Haupais

Marquis de Sade chronology
Dantzig Twist (1979)	Rue de Siam (1981)

Dantzig Twist is the debut studio album by French post-punk band Marquis de Sade, released in 1979 by record label Pathé.

== Track listing ==
Side A
No.	Title	Length
1.	"Set in Motion Memories"	3:50
2.	"Henry"	3:25
3.	"Walls"	3:37
4.	"Conrad Veidt"	4:54
5.	"Nacht Und Nebel"	0:55

Side B
No.	Title	Length
1.	"Who Said Why?"	3:25
2.	"Japanese Spy"	2:12
3.	"Skin Disease"	3:33
4.	"Boys-Boys"	4:50
5.	"Smiles"	2:35

CD version only
No.	Title	Length
1.	"Airtight Cell"
2.	"Henry" (original version)
3.	"Die"
