= Saint-Trimoël =

Saint-Trimoël Sant-Rivoued
- Commune
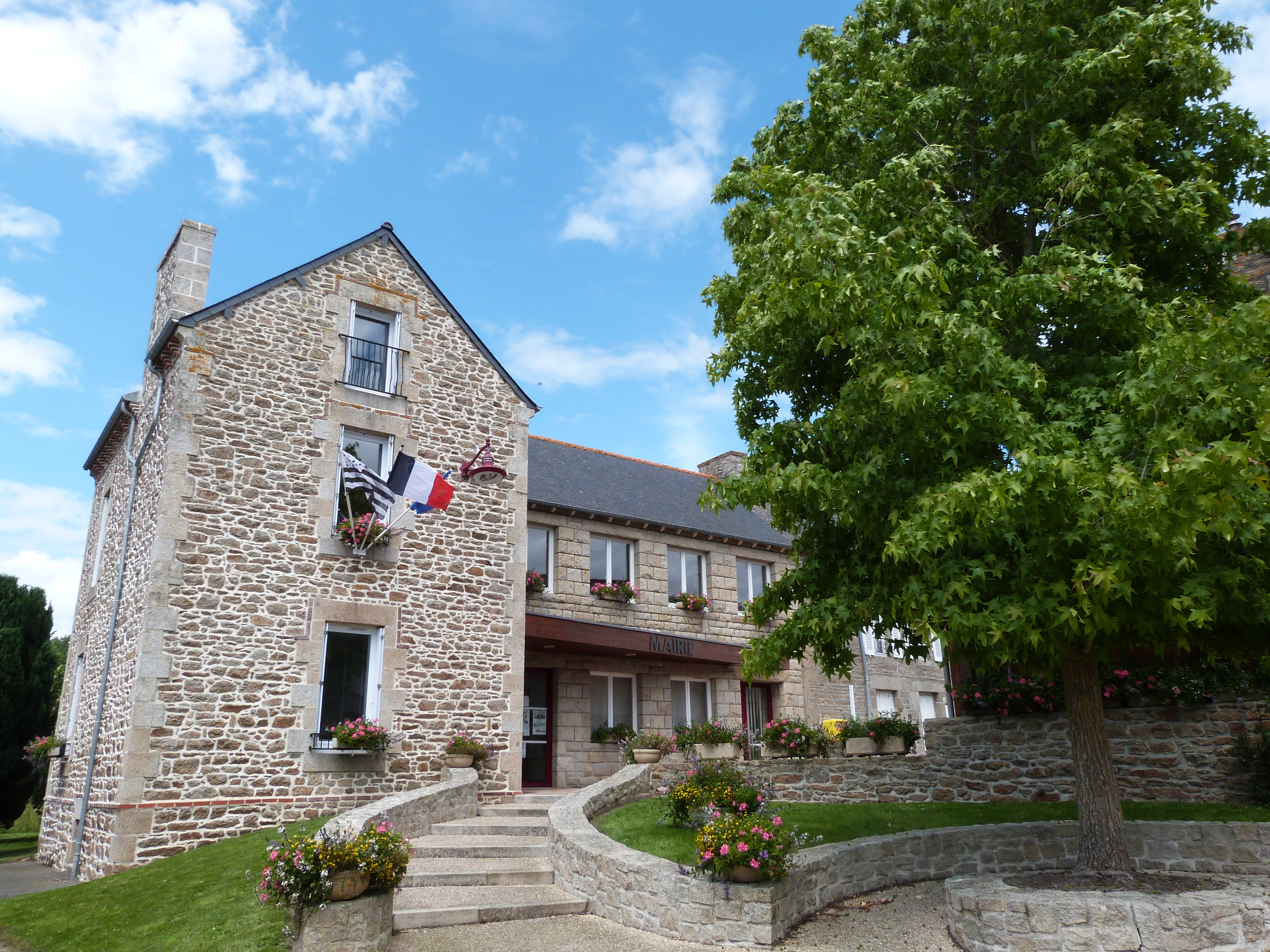
- The town hall of Saint-Trimoël
- Location of Saint-Trimoël
- Location within France Location within Brittany
- Coordinates: 48°23′13″N 2°32′52″W
- Country: France
- Region: Brittany
- Department: Côtes-d'Armor
- Arrondissement: Saint-Brieuc
- Canton: Plénée-Jugon
- Intercommunality: CA Lamballe Terre et Mer

Government
  - Mayor (2024–2026): Annie Valo
- Area^{1}: 8.35 km^{2} (3.22 sq mi)
- Highest elevation: 154 m (505 ft)
- Lowest elevation: 68 m (223 ft)
- Population (2023): 526
  - Density: 63.0/km^{2} (163/sq mi)
- Time zone: UTC+01:00 (CET)
  - Summer (DST): UTC+02:00 (CEST)
- INSEE/Postal code: 22332 /22510
- ^{1} French Land Register data, which excludes lakes, ponds, glaciers > 1 km^{2} (0.386 sq mi or 247 acres) and river estuaries.

Saint-Trimoël (French pronunciation: [sɛ̃ tʁimwɛl]; Breton: Sant-Rivoued) is a commune in the Côtes-d'Armor department of Brittany in northwestern France.

== Population ==
Historical population
Year	Pop.	±% p.a.
1968	393	—
1975	347	−1.76%
1982	314	−1.42%
1990	296	−0.74%
1999	319	+0.83%
2007	391	+2.58%
2012	458	+3.21%
2017	544	+3.50%
2023	526	−0.56%
Source: INSEE

Inhabitants of Saint-Trimoël are called trimoeliens in French.

== See also ==
- Communes of the Côtes-d'Armor department
