= Plestan =

Plestan Plestan
- Commune
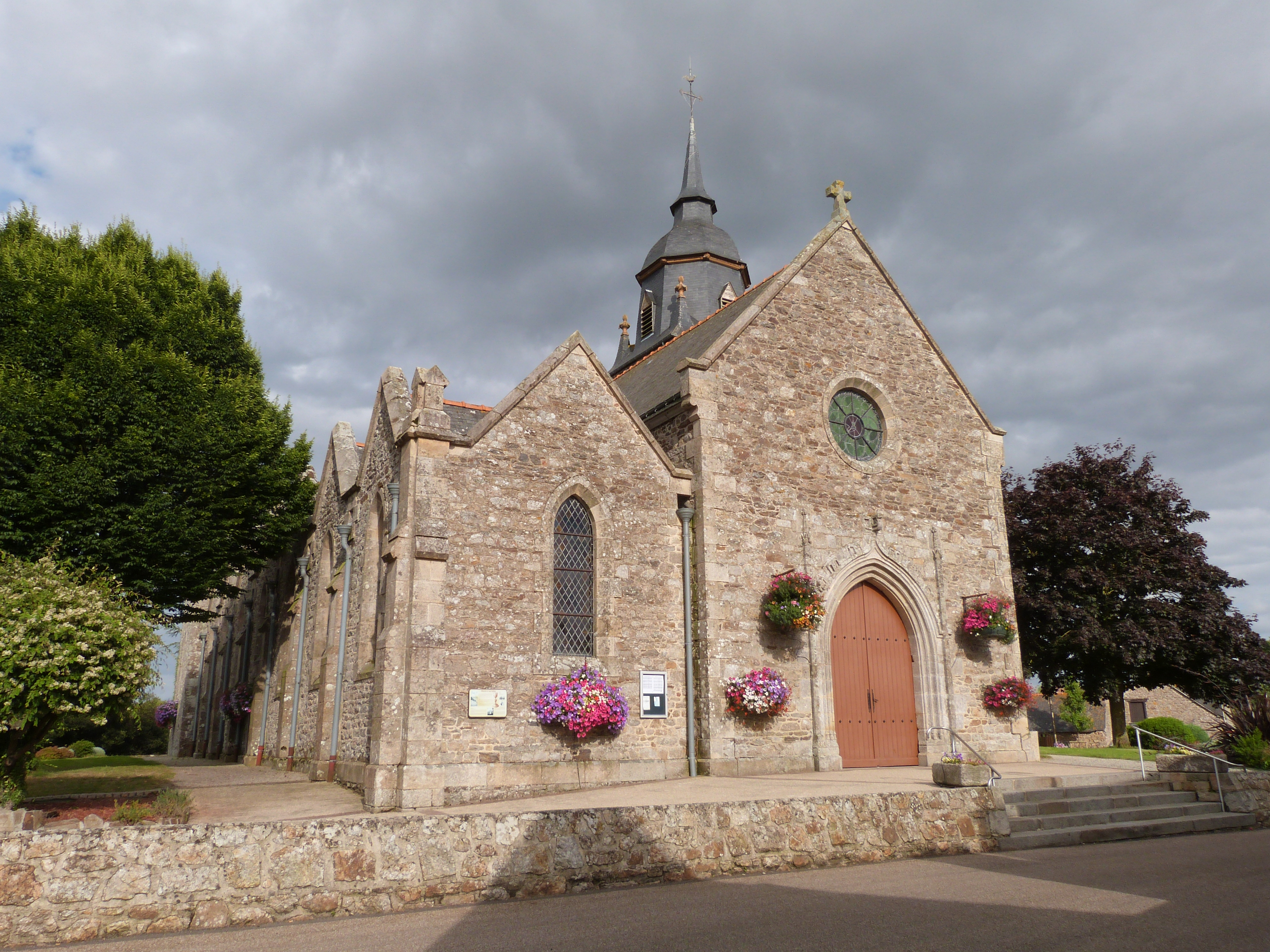
- Church of Saint-Pierre in Plestan
- Location of Plestan
- Location within France Location within Brittany
- Coordinates: 48°25′28″N 2°26′44″W
- Country: France
- Region: Brittany
- Department: Côtes-d'Armor
- Arrondissement: Saint-Brieuc
- Canton: Plénée-Jugon
- Intercommunality: CA Lamballe Terre et Mer

Government
  - Mayor (2020–2026): Claudine Aillet
- Area^{1}: 32.81 km^{2} (12.67 sq mi)
- Highest elevation: 142 m (466 ft)
- Lowest elevation: 55 m (180 ft)
- Population (2023): 1,635
  - Density: 49.83/km^{2} (129.1/sq mi)
- Time zone: UTC+01:00 (CET)
  - Summer (DST): UTC+02:00 (CEST)
- INSEE/Postal code: 22193 /22640
- ^{1} French Land Register data, which excludes lakes, ponds, glaciers > 1 km^{2} (0.386 sq mi or 247 acres) and river estuaries.

Plestan (French pronunciation: [plɛtɑ̃]; Breton: Plestan) is a commune in the Côtes-d'Armor department of Brittany in northwestern France.

== Population ==
Historical population
Year	Pop.	±% p.a.
1968	1,317	—
1975	1,233	−0.94%
1982	1,245	+0.14%
1990	1,306	+0.60%
1999	1,396	+0.74%
2007	1,524	+1.10%
2012	1,539	+0.20%
2017	1,598	+0.76%
2023	1,635	+0.38%
Source: INSEE

Inhabitants of Plestan are called plestannais in French.

== See also ==
- Communes of the Côtes-d'Armor department
