= La Malhoure =

La Malhoure Lanvelor
- Commune
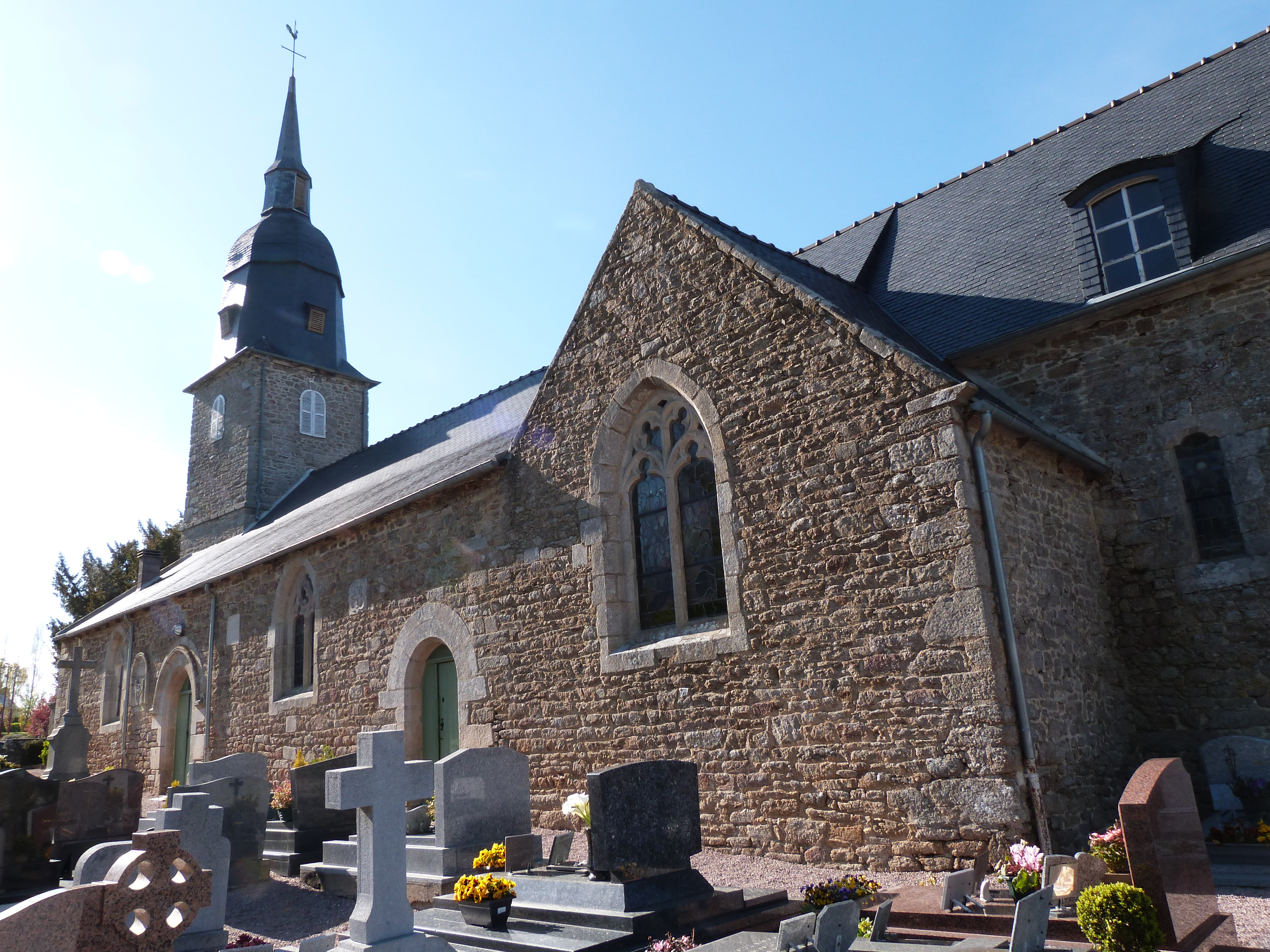
- The church of Saint-Event

- Coat of arms
- Location of La Malhoure
- Location within France Location within Brittany
- Coordinates: 48°23′52″N 2°29′36″W
- Country: France
- Region: Brittany
- Department: Côtes-d'Armor
- Arrondissement: Saint-Brieuc
- Canton: Lamballe-Armor
- Intercommunality: CA Lamballe Terre et Mer

Government
  - Mayor (2020–2026): Valérie Morfouasse
- Area^{1}: 5.02 km^{2} (1.94 sq mi)
- Highest elevation: 141 m (463 ft)
- Lowest elevation: 77 m (253 ft)
- Population (2023): 626
  - Density: 125/km^{2} (323/sq mi)
- Time zone: UTC+01:00 (CET)
  - Summer (DST): UTC+02:00 (CEST)
- INSEE/Postal code: 22140 /22640
- ^{1} French Land Register data, which excludes lakes, ponds, glaciers > 1 km^{2} (0.386 sq mi or 247 acres) and river estuaries.

La Malhoure (French pronunciation: [la maluʁ]; Breton: Lanvelor) is a commune in the Côtes-d'Armor department of Brittany in northwestern France.

== Population ==
Historical population
Year	Pop.	±% p.a.
1968	238	—
1975	229	−0.55%
1982	237	+0.49%
1990	266	+1.45%
1999	348	+3.03%
2007	450	+3.27%
2012	513	+2.66%
2017	594	+2.98%
2023	626	+0.88%
Source: INSEE

Inhabitants of La Malhoure are called malhourins or malhourains in French.

== See also ==
- Communes of the Côtes-d'Armor department
