= Andel, Côtes-d'Armor =

Andel Andel
- Commune
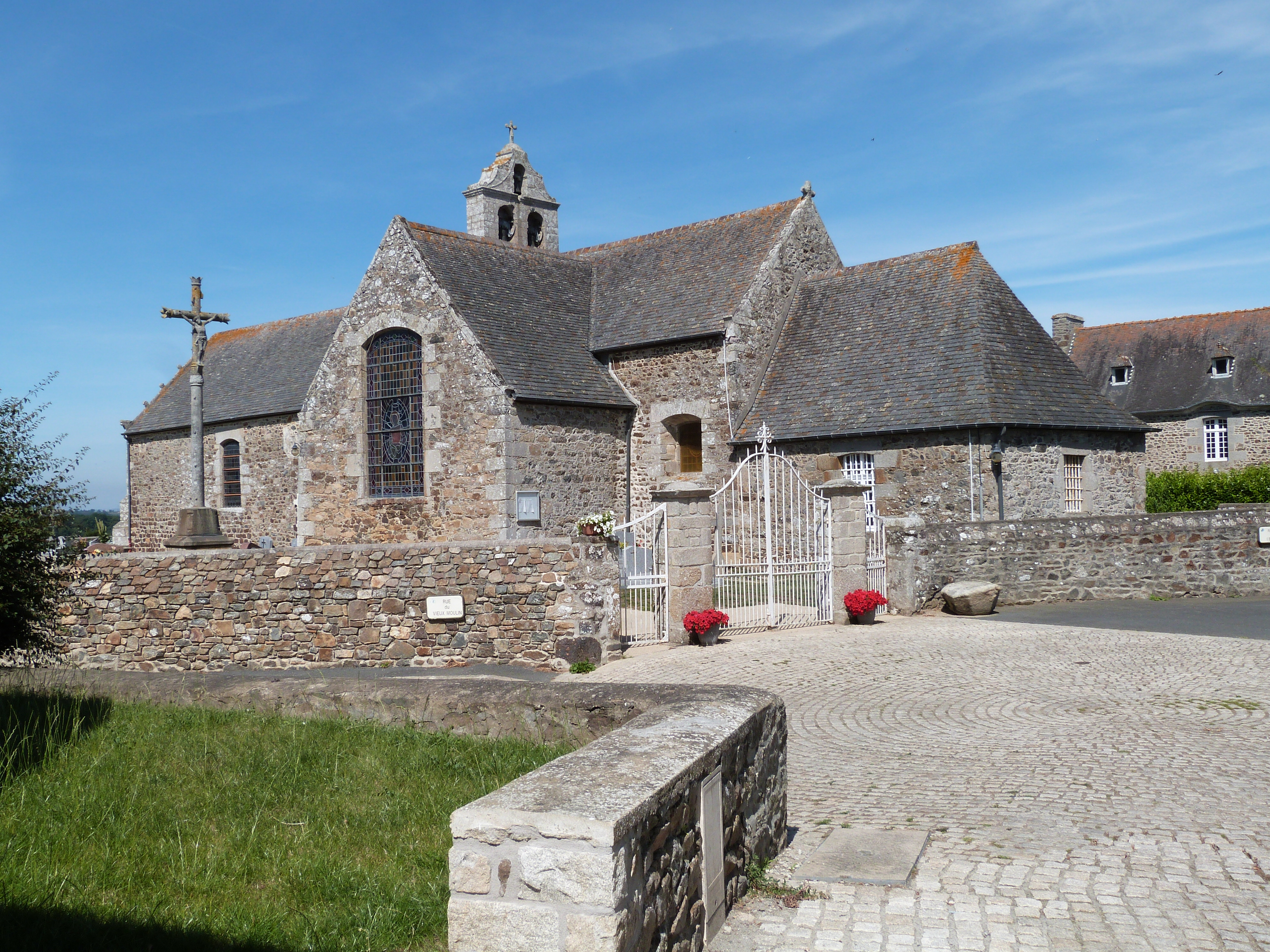
- The church of Saint-Pierre and Saint-Jean-Baptiste
- Location of Andel
- Location within France Location within Brittany
- Coordinates: 48°29′27″N 2°33′59″W
- Country: France
- Region: Brittany
- Department: Côtes-d'Armor
- Arrondissement: Saint-Brieuc
- Canton: Lamballe-Armor
- Intercommunality: CA Lamballe Terre et Mer

Government
  - Mayor (2020–2026): Nicole Poulain
- Area^{1}: 12.20 km^{2} (4.71 sq mi)
- Highest elevation: 122 m (400 ft)
- Lowest elevation: 32 m (105 ft)
- Population (2023): 1,180
  - Density: 96.7/km^{2} (251/sq mi)
- Time zone: UTC+01:00 (CET)
  - Summer (DST): UTC+02:00 (CEST)
- INSEE/Postal code: 22002 /22400
- ^{1} French Land Register data, which excludes lakes, ponds, glaciers > 1 km^{2} (0.386 sq mi or 247 acres) and river estuaries.

Andel (French pronunciation: [ɑ̃dɛl]; Breton: Andel; Gallo: Andèu) is a commune in the Côtes-d'Armor department of Brittany in north-western France.

== Population ==
Historical population
Year	Pop.	±% p.a.
1968	517	—
1975	565	+1.28%
1982	717	+3.46%
1990	727	+0.17%
1999	900	+2.40%
2007	1,024	+1.63%
2012	1,119	+1.79%
2017	1,124	+0.09%
2023	1,180	+0.81%
Source: INSEE

Inhabitants of Andel are called Andelais in French.

== See also ==
- Communes of the Côtes-d'Armor department
