= Hénon, Côtes-d'Armor =

Hénon Henon
- Commune
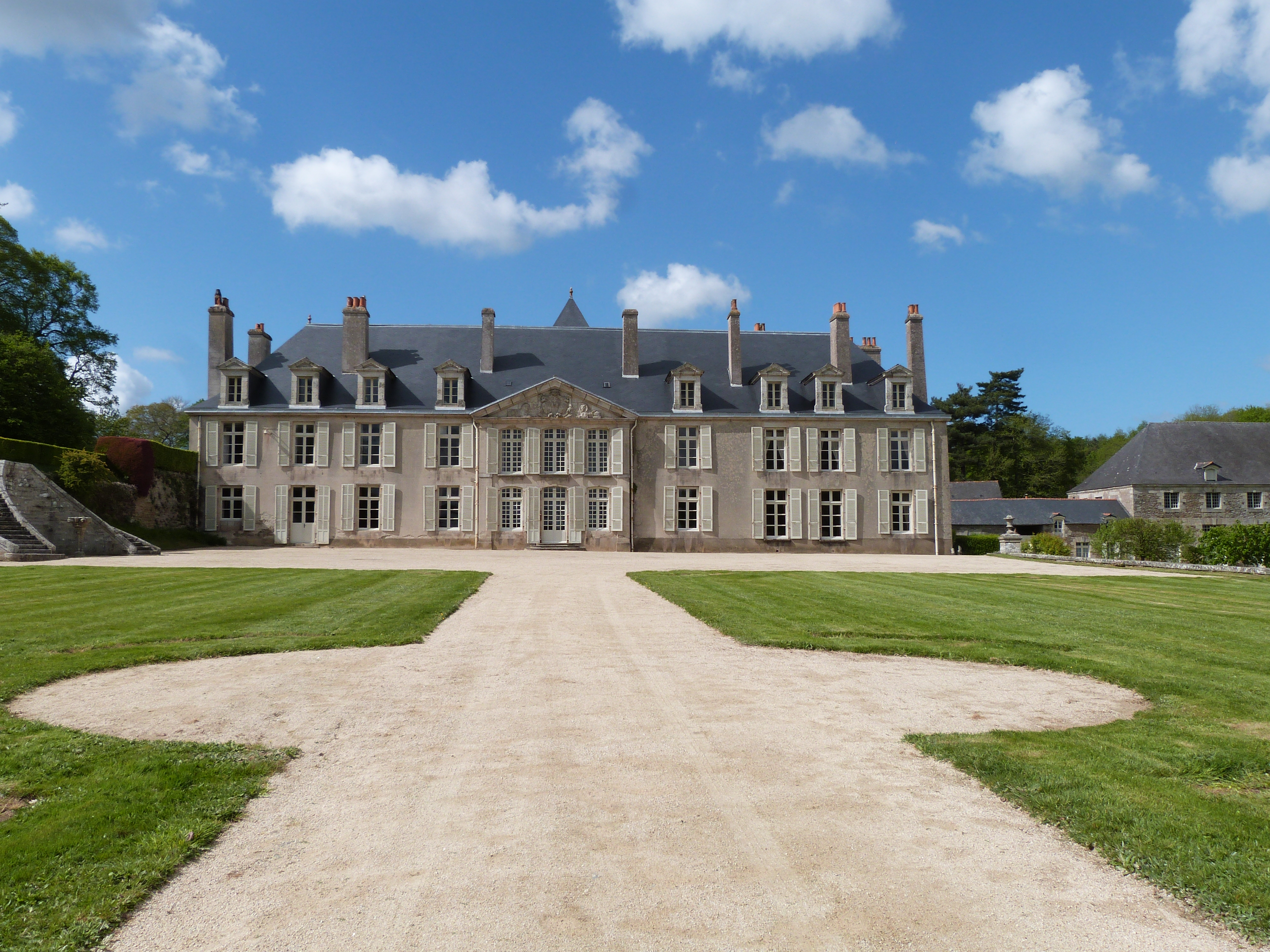
- The château of Catuelan, in Hénon
- Location of Hénon
- Location within France Location within Brittany
- Coordinates: 48°23′07″N 2°40′57″W
- Country: France
- Region: Brittany
- Department: Côtes-d'Armor
- Arrondissement: Saint-Brieuc
- Canton: Plaintel
- Intercommunality: CA Lamballe Terre et Mer

Government
  - Mayor (2020–2026): Thierry Andrieux
- Area^{1}: 40.87 km^{2} (15.78 sq mi)
- Highest elevation: 251 m (823 ft)
- Lowest elevation: 64 m (210 ft)
- Population (2023): 2,310
  - Density: 56.5/km^{2} (146/sq mi)
- Time zone: UTC+01:00 (CET)
  - Summer (DST): UTC+02:00 (CEST)
- INSEE/Postal code: 22079 /22150
- ^{1} French Land Register data, which excludes lakes, ponds, glaciers > 1 km^{2} (0.386 sq mi or 247 acres) and river estuaries.

Hénon (French pronunciation: [enɔ̃]; Breton: Henon; Gallo: Hénon) is a commune in the Côtes-d'Armor department of Brittany in northwestern France.

== Population ==
Inhabitants of Hénon are called hénonnais in French.

Historical population
Year	Pop.	±% p.a.
1968	1,889	—
1975	1,735	−1.21%
1982	1,747	+0.10%
1990	1,740	−0.05%
1999	1,733	−0.04%
2007	2,064	+2.21%
2012	2,211	+1.39%
2017	2,242	+0.28%
2023	2,310	+0.50%
Source: INSEE

== See also ==
- Communes of the Côtes-d'Armor department
