= Canton of Lamballe-Armor =

Coordinates: 48.47°N 2.51°W

The canton of Lamballe-Armor (before 2021: Lamballe) is an administrative division of the Côtes-d'Armor department, northwestern France. Its borders were modified at the French canton reorganisation which came into effect in March 2015. Its seat is in Lamballe-Armor.

It consists of the following communes:

1. Andel
2. Coëtmieux
3. Hénansal
4. Lamballe-Armor (partly)
5. Landéhen
6. La Malhoure
7. Noyal
8. Pommeret
9. Quintenic
10. Saint-Rieul
