= Plaintel =

Plaintel Pleneventer
- Commune
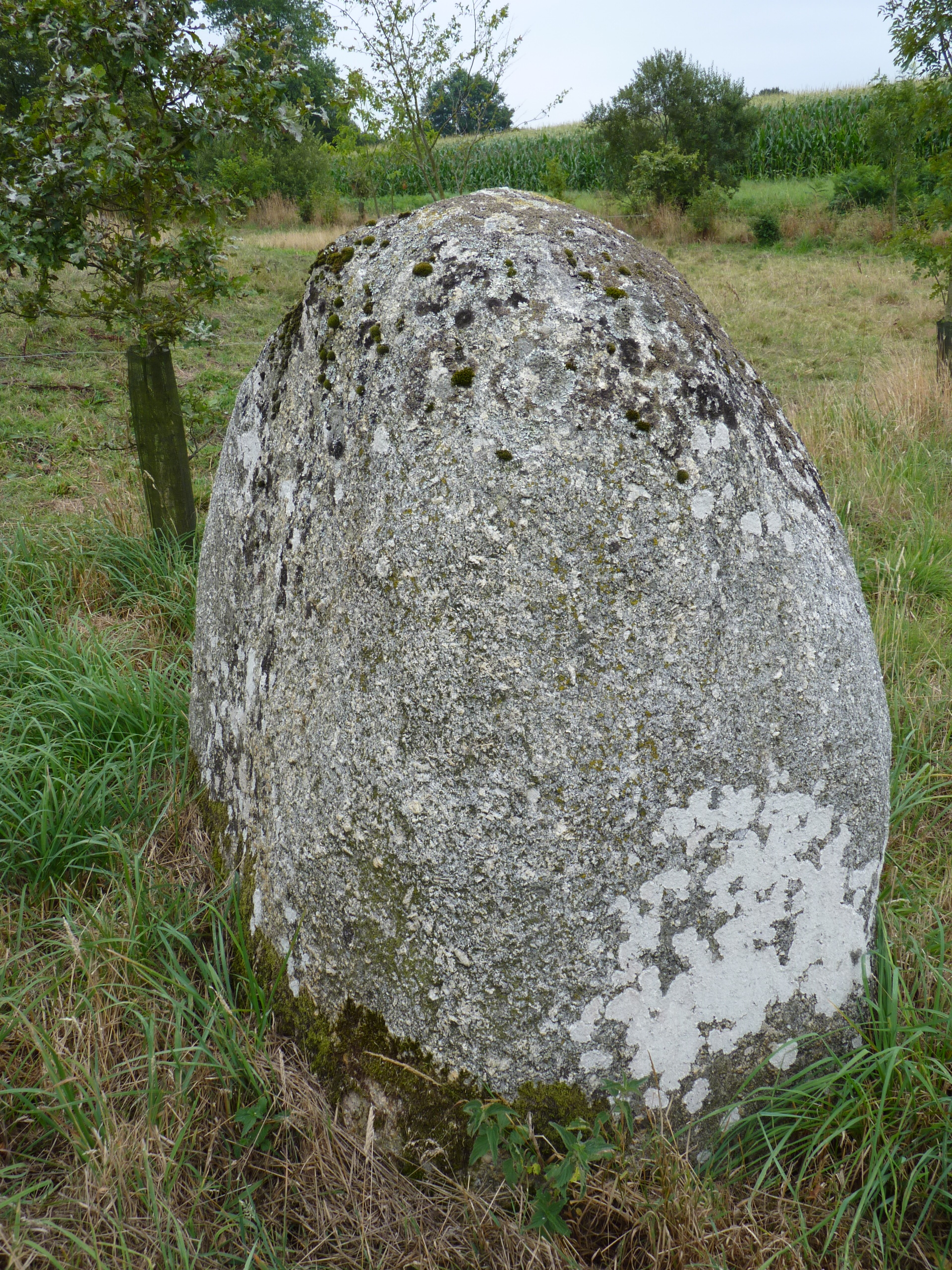
- The Menhir du Petit Vauridel, in Plaintel

- Coat of arms
- Location of Plaintel
- Location within France Location within Brittany
- Coordinates: 48°24′32″N 2°49′01″W
- Country: France
- Region: Brittany
- Department: Côtes-d'Armor
- Arrondissement: Saint-Brieuc
- Canton: Plaintel
- Intercommunality: Saint-Brieuc Armor

Government
  - Mayor (2020–2026): Vincent Alleno
- Area^{1}: 26.76 km^{2} (10.33 sq mi)
- Highest elevation: 246 m (807 ft)
- Lowest elevation: 100 m (330 ft)
- Population (2023): 4,602
  - Density: 172.0/km^{2} (445.4/sq mi)
- Time zone: UTC+01:00 (CET)
  - Summer (DST): UTC+02:00 (CEST)
- INSEE/Postal code: 22171 /22940
- ^{1} French Land Register data, which excludes lakes, ponds, glaciers > 1 km^{2} (0.386 sq mi or 247 acres) and river estuaries.

Plaintel (French pronunciation: [plɛ̃tɛl]; Breton: Pleneventer; Gallo: Plentèr) is a commune in the Côtes-d'Armor department of Brittany in northwestern France.

== Population ==
Inhabitants of Plaintel are called plaintelois or plaintelais in French.

Historical population
Year	Pop.	±% p.a.
1968	2,322	—
1975	2,885	+3.15%
1982	3,436	+2.53%
1990	3,557	+0.43%
1999	3,471	−0.27%
2007	3,800	+1.14%
2012	4,206	+2.05%
2017	4,344	+0.65%
2023	4,602	+0.97%
Source: INSEE

== See also ==
- Communes of the Côtes-d'Armor department
