= Coëtmieux =

Coëtmieux Koedmaeg
- Commune
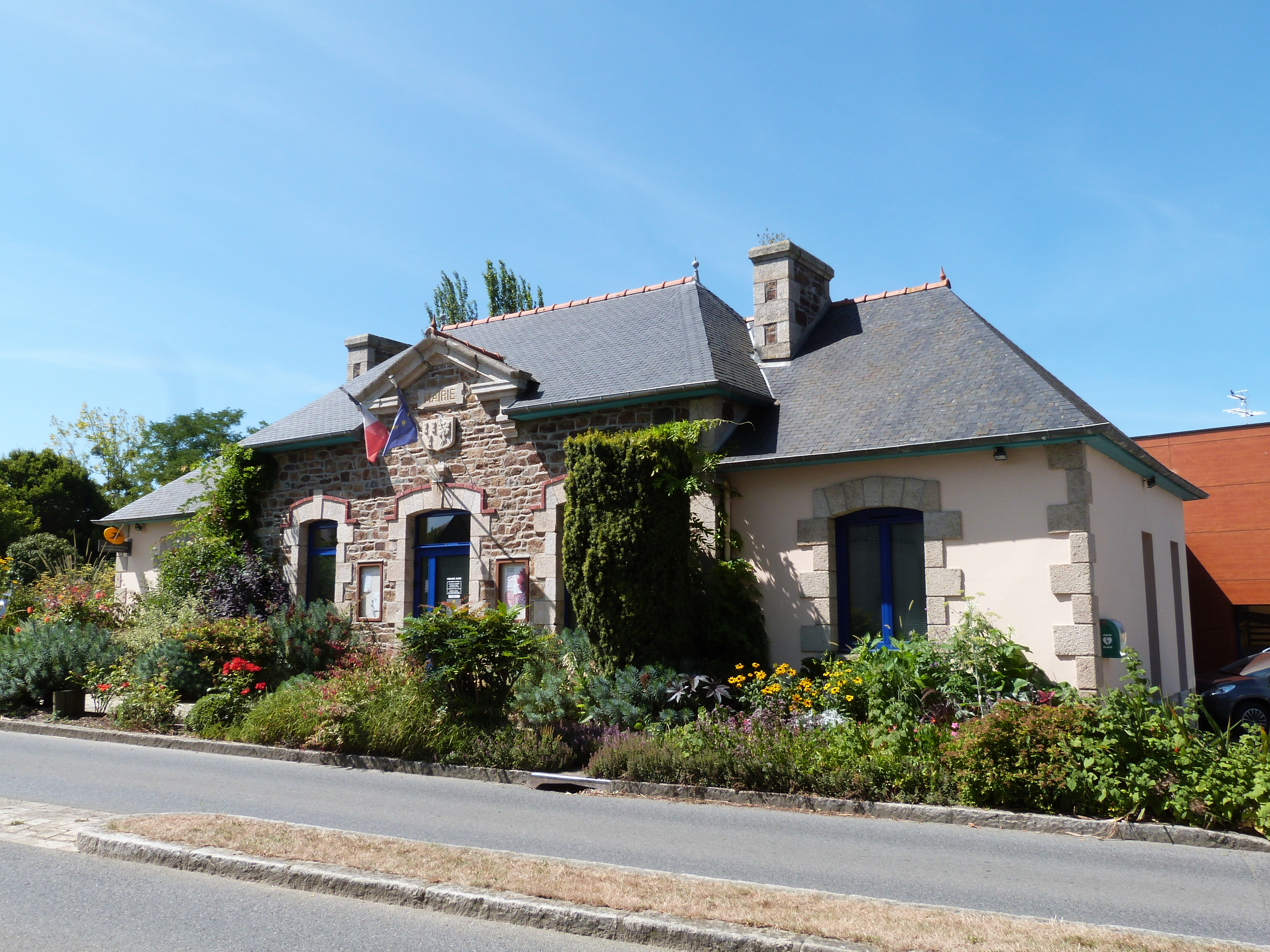
- The town hall of Coëtmieux

- Coat of arms
- Location of Coëtmieux
- Location within France Location within Brittany
- Coordinates: 48°29′33″N 2°35′57″W
- Country: France
- Region: Brittany
- Department: Côtes-d'Armor
- Arrondissement: Saint-Brieuc
- Canton: Lamballe-Armor
- Intercommunality: CA Lamballe Terre et Mer

Government
  - Mayor (2020–2026): Dominique Tirel
- Area^{1}: 8.02 km^{2} (3.10 sq mi)
- Highest elevation: 83 m (272 ft)
- Lowest elevation: 32 m (105 ft)
- Population (2023): 1,869
  - Density: 233/km^{2} (604/sq mi)
- Time zone: UTC+01:00 (CET)
  - Summer (DST): UTC+02:00 (CEST)
- INSEE/Postal code: 22044 /22400
- ^{1} French Land Register data, which excludes lakes, ponds, glaciers > 1 km^{2} (0.386 sq mi or 247 acres) and river estuaries.

Coëtmieux (French pronunciation: [kwɛtmjø]; Breton: Koedmaeg; Gallo: Coétmioec) is a commune in the Côtes-d'Armor department of Brittany in northwestern France.

== Population ==
Historical population
Year	Pop.	±% p.a.
1968	624	—
1975	874	+4.93%
1982	1,041	+2.53%
1990	1,236	+2.17%
1999	1,253	+0.15%
2007	1,515	+2.40%
2012	1,662	+1.87%
2017	1,772	+1.29%
2023	1,869	+0.89%
Source: INSEE

Inhabitants of Coëtmieux are called Coëtmieusiens in French.

== See also ==
- Communes of the Côtes-d'Armor department
