= Trébry =

Trébry Trebrid
- Commune
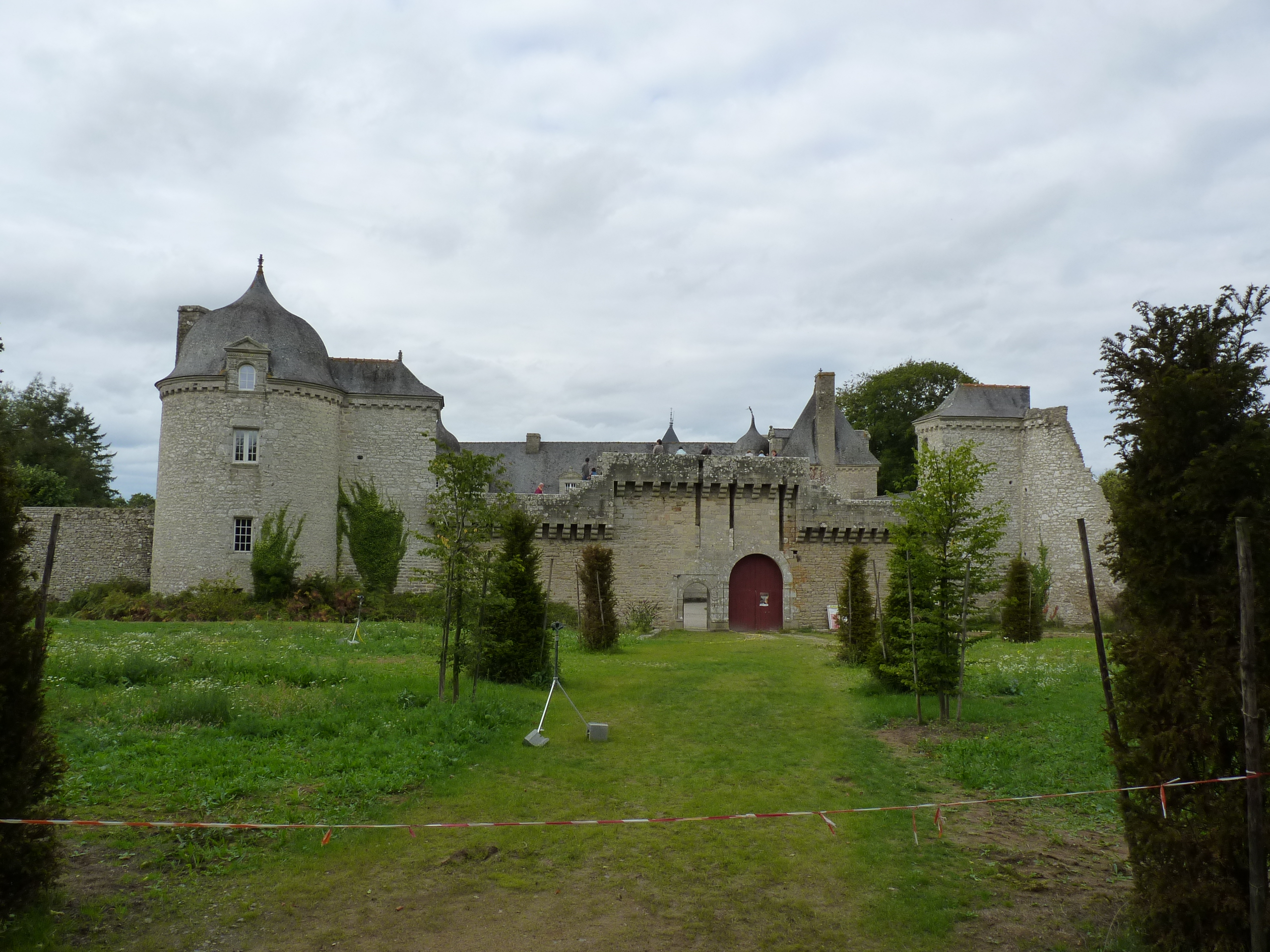
- The château de la Touche, in Trébry
- Location of Trébry
- Location within France Location within Brittany
- Coordinates: 48°21′21″N 2°33′02″W
- Country: France
- Region: Brittany
- Department: Côtes-d'Armor
- Arrondissement: Saint-Brieuc
- Canton: Plénée-Jugon
- Intercommunality: CA Lamballe Terre et Mer

Government
  - Mayor (2020–2026): Daniel Commault
- Area^{1}: 25.12 km^{2} (9.70 sq mi)
- Highest elevation: 340 m (1,120 ft)
- Lowest elevation: 105 m (344 ft)
- Population (2023): 844
  - Density: 33.6/km^{2} (87.0/sq mi)
- Time zone: UTC+01:00 (CET)
  - Summer (DST): UTC+02:00 (CEST)
- INSEE/Postal code: 22345 /22510
- ^{1} French Land Register data, which excludes lakes, ponds, glaciers > 1 km^{2} (0.386 sq mi or 247 acres) and river estuaries.

Trébry (French pronunciation: [tʁebʁi]; Breton: Trebrid; Gallo: Trébrit) is a commune in the Côtes-d'Armor department of Brittany in northwestern France.

== Population ==
Historical population
Year	Pop.	±% p.a.
1968	850	—
1975	758	−1.62%
1982	728	−0.58%
1990	742	+0.24%
1999	720	−0.33%
2007	719	−0.02%
2012	825	+2.79%
2017	798	−0.66%
2023	844	+0.94%
Source: INSEE

Inhabitants of Trébry are called trébritiens in French.

== See also ==
- Communes of the Côtes-d'Armor department
