= Pommeret =

Pommeret Peuñvrid
- Commune
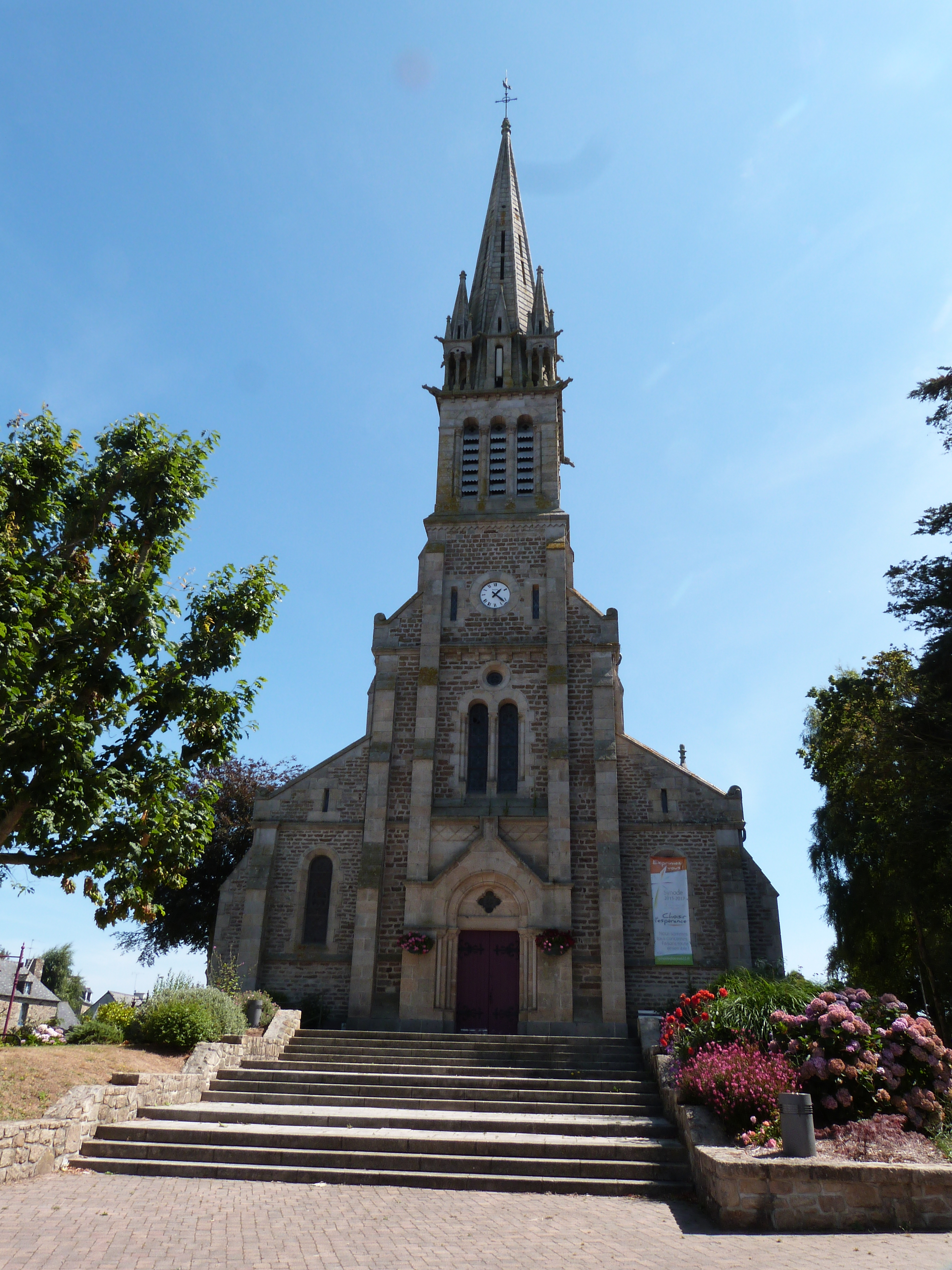
- The church of Saint-Pierre, in Pommeret
- Location of Pommeret
- Location within France Location within Brittany
- Coordinates: 48°27′48″N 2°37′30″W
- Country: France
- Region: Brittany
- Department: Côtes-d'Armor
- Arrondissement: Saint-Brieuc
- Canton: Lamballe-Armor
- Intercommunality: CA Lamballe Terre et Mer

Government
  - Mayor (2020–2026): Serge Guinard
- Area^{1}: 13.35 km^{2} (5.15 sq mi)
- Highest elevation: 80 m (260 ft)
- Lowest elevation: 35 m (115 ft)
- Population (2023): 2,116
  - Density: 158.5/km^{2} (410.5/sq mi)
- Time zone: UTC+01:00 (CET)
  - Summer (DST): UTC+02:00 (CEST)
- INSEE/Postal code: 22246 /22120
- ^{1} French Land Register data, which excludes lakes, ponds, glaciers > 1 km^{2} (0.386 sq mi or 247 acres) and river estuaries.

Pommeret (French pronunciation: [pɔmʁɛ]; Breton: Peuñvrid; Gallo: Pomerèt) is a commune in the Côtes-d'Armor department of Brittany in northwestern France.

== Population ==
Inhabitants of Pommeret are called pommeretois or pommeretin in French.

Historical population
Year	Pop.	±% p.a.
1968	1,108	—
1975	1,148	+0.51%
1982	1,426	+3.15%
1990	1,696	+2.19%
1999	1,709	+0.08%
2007	1,845	+0.96%
2012	2,028	+1.91%
2017	2,075	+0.46%
2023	2,116	+0.33%
Source: INSEE

== See also ==
- Communes of the Côtes-d'Armor department
