= Lamballe Terre et Mer =

Guingamp-Paimpol Agglomération
- Communauté d'agglomération
- Interactive map of Guingamp-Paimpol Agglomération
- Coordinates: 48°26′N 02°27′W
- Country: France
- Region: Brittany
- Department: Côtes-d'Armor
- No. of communes: {{{nbcomm}}}
- Established: 2017
- Area: 912.9 km^{2} (352.5 sq mi)
- Population (2019): 67,875
  - Density: 74.35/km^{2} (192.6/sq mi)
- Website: www.lamballe-terre-mer.bzh

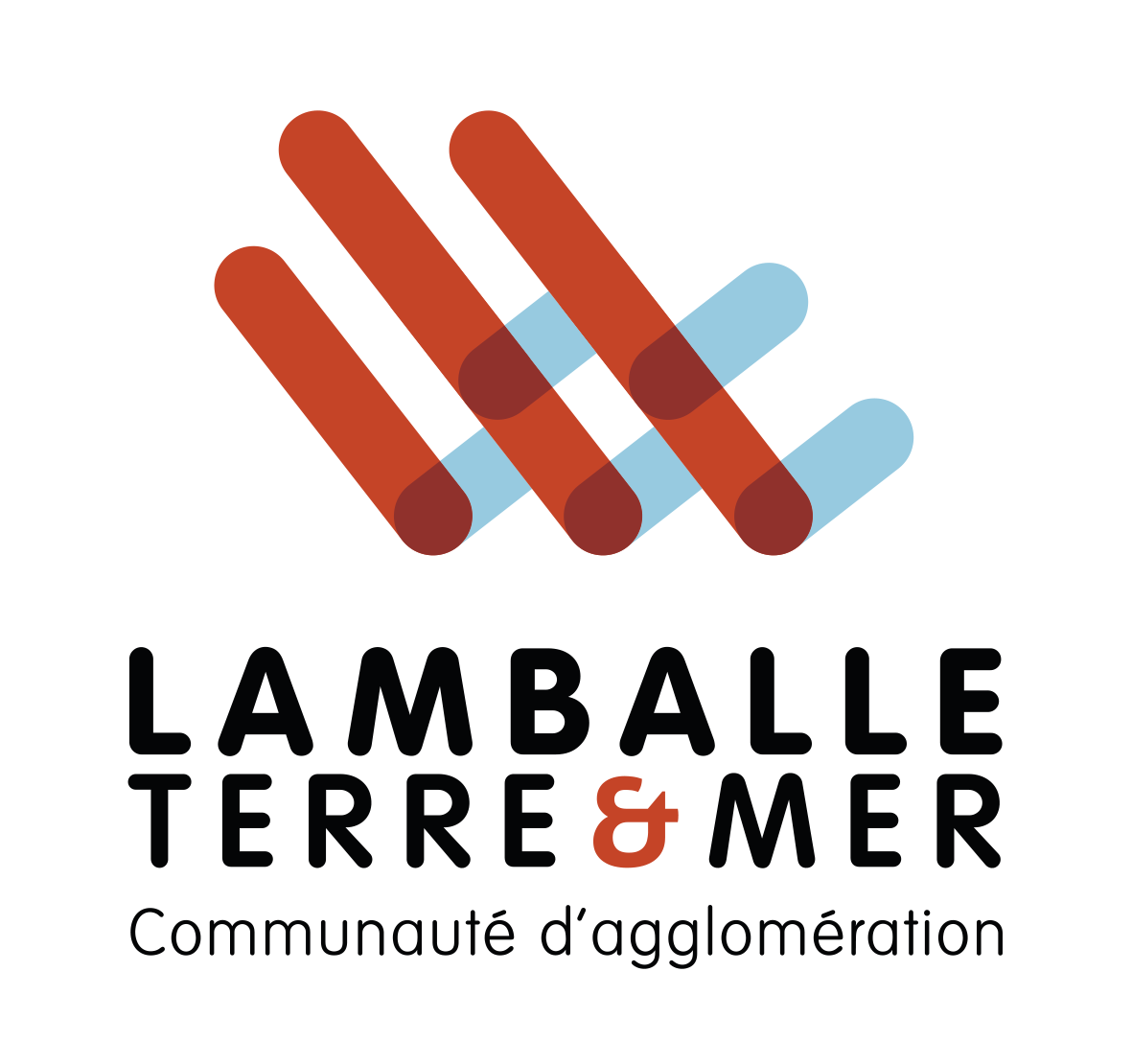
Logo of the Lamballe Terre & Mer agglomeration community

Lamballe Terre et Mer (Breton: Douar ha Mor Lamballe) is the communauté d'agglomération, an intercommunal structure, centred on the town of Lamballe-Armor. It is located in the Côtes-d'Armor department, in the Brittany region, northwestern France. Created in 2017, its seat is in Lamballe-Armor. Its area is 912.9 km^{2}. Its population was 67,875 in 2019, of which 16,688 in Lamballe-Armor proper.

== Composition ==
The communauté d'agglomération consists of the following 38 communes:

1. Andel
2. La Bouillie
3. Bréhand
4. Coëtmieux
5. Éréac
6. Erquy
7. Hénanbihen
8. Hénansal
9. Hénon
10. Jugon-les-Lacs-Commune-Nouvelle
11. La Malhoure
12. Lamballe-Armor
13. Landéhen
14. Lanrelas
15. Moncontour
16. Noyal
17. Penguily
18. Plédéliac
19. Plémy
20. Plénée-Jugon
21. Pléneuf-Val-André
22. Plestan
23. Plurien
24. Pommeret
25. Quessoy
26. Quintenic
27. Rouillac
28. Saint-Alban
29. Saint-Denoual
30. Saint-Glen
31. Saint-Rieul
32. Saint-Trimoël
33. Sévignac
34. Tramain
35. Trébry
36. Trédaniel
37. Trédias
38. Trémeur
