= Saint-Rieul =

Saint-Rieul Sant-Rieg
- Commune
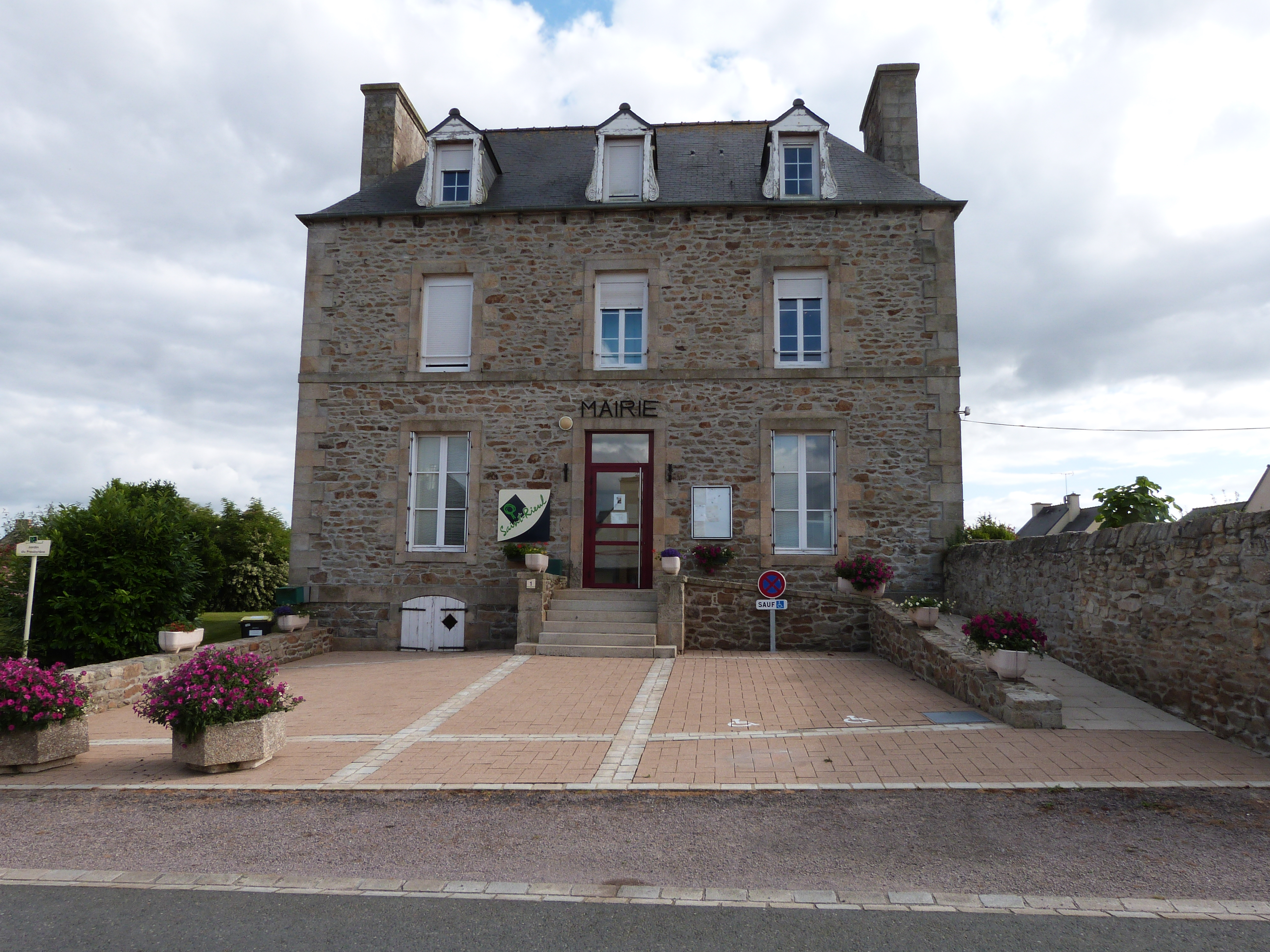
- The town hall of Saint-Rieul
- Location of Saint-Rieul
- Location within France Location within Brittany
- Coordinates: 48°26′35″N 2°25′06″W
- Country: France
- Region: Brittany
- Department: Côtes-d'Armor
- Arrondissement: Saint-Brieuc
- Canton: Lamballe-Armor
- Intercommunality: CA Lamballe Terre et Mer

Government
  - Mayor (2020–2026): Catherine Drezet
- Area^{1}: 6.37 km^{2} (2.46 sq mi)
- Highest elevation: 106 m (348 ft)
- Lowest elevation: 64 m (210 ft)
- Population (2023): 551
  - Density: 86.5/km^{2} (224/sq mi)
- Time zone: UTC+01:00 (CET)
  - Summer (DST): UTC+02:00 (CEST)
- INSEE/Postal code: 22326 /22270
- ^{1} French Land Register data, which excludes lakes, ponds, glaciers > 1 km^{2} (0.386 sq mi or 247 acres) and river estuaries.

Saint-Rieul (French pronunciation: [sɛ̃ ʁjœl]; Breton: Sant-Rieg) is a commune in the Côtes-d'Armor department of Brittany in northwestern France.

== Population ==
Historical population
Year	Pop.	±% p.a.
1968	306	—
1975	281	−1.21%
1982	312	+1.51%
1990	344	+1.23%
1999	328	−0.53%
2007	412	+2.89%
2012	510	+4.36%
2017	550	+1.52%
2023	551	+0.03%
Source: INSEE

Inhabitants of Saint-Rieul are called rieulais in French.

== See also ==
- Communes of the Côtes-d'Armor department
