= Roland Rieul =

Roland Edouard Rieul (8 January 1906 – 17 May 1995) was a French soldier, a member of the 6th French Division, a prisoner of war, and then after his escape a secret agent for the British SIS. He wrote a memoir Escape Into Espionage: The True Story of a French Patriot.

His memoirs were published in 1986 as Soldier into Spy: the memoirs of Roland Rieul (Kimber, ISBN 0718306139) Rieul later lived on the Isle of Wight, where he died in May 1995 at the age of 89.
