= Canton of Plénée-Jugon =

Coordinates: 48.36°N 2.40°W

The canton of Plénée-Jugon is an administrative division of the Côtes-d'Armor department, northwestern France. It was created at the French canton reorganisation which came into effect in March 2015. Its seat is in Plénée-Jugon.

It consists of the following communes:

- Bréhand
- Jugon-les-Lacs-Commune-Nouvelle
- Le Mené
- Penguily
- Plédéliac
- Plénée-Jugon
- Plestan
- Saint-Glen
- Saint-Trimoël
- Tramain
- Trébry
