= Langast =

Commune in Côtes-d'Armor, France

Langast Lanwal
- Part of Plouguenast-Langast
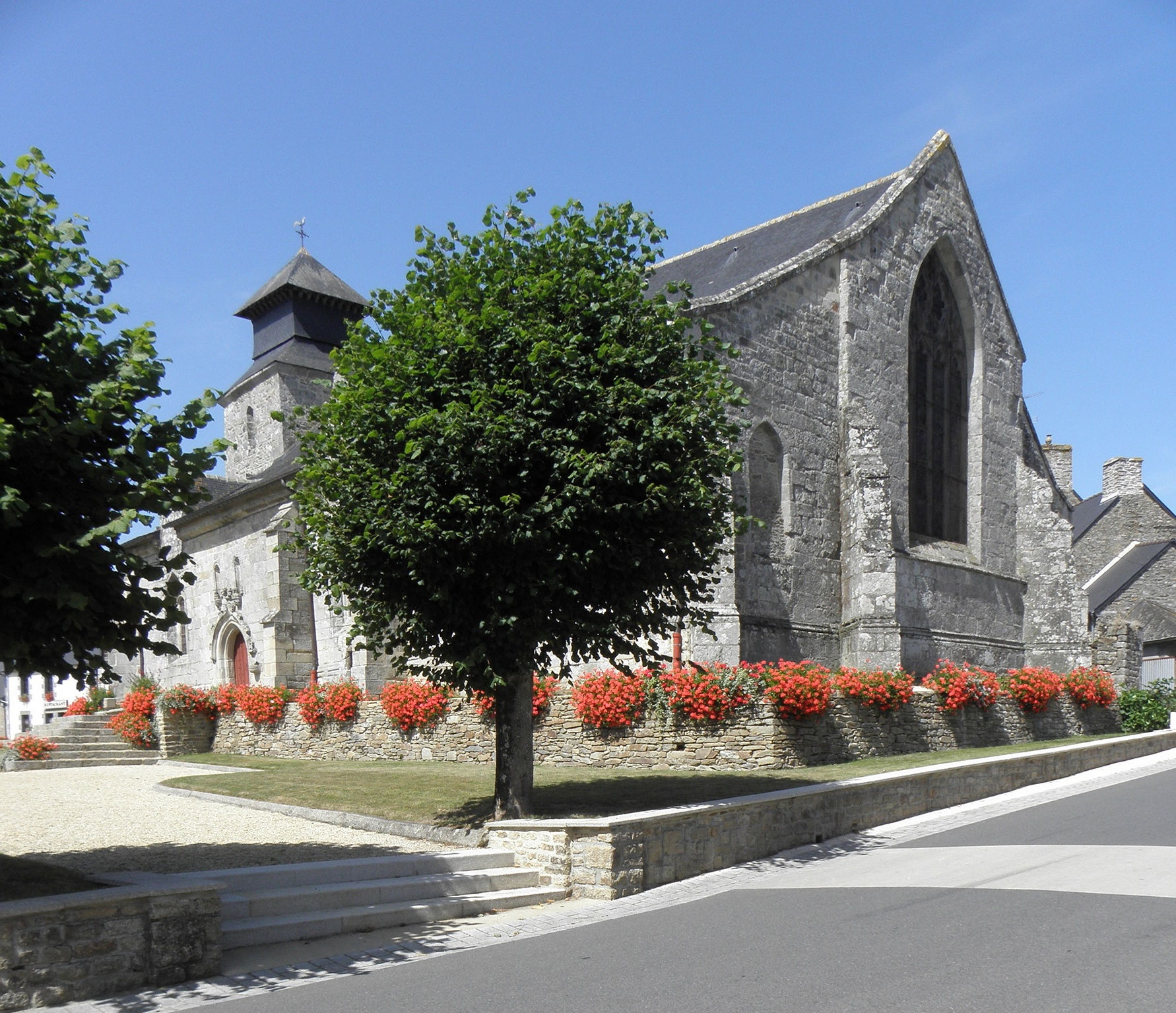
- The church of Saint-Gal, in Langast
- Location of Langast
- Location within France Location within Brittany
- Coordinates: 48°16′51″N 2°39′45″W
- Country: France
- Region: Brittany
- Department: Côtes-d'Armor
- Arrondissement: Saint-Brieuc
- Canton: Guerlédan
- Commune: Plouguenast-Langast
- Area^{1}: 20.45 km^{2} (7.90 sq mi)
- Highest elevation: 240 m (790 ft)
- Lowest elevation: 104 m (341 ft)
- Population (2023): 563
  - Density: 27.5/km^{2} (71.3/sq mi)
- Time zone: UTC+01:00 (CET)
  - Summer (DST): UTC+02:00 (CEST)
- Postal code: 22150
- ^{1} French Land Register data, which excludes lakes, ponds, glaciers > 1 km^{2} (0.386 sq mi or 247 acres) and river estuaries.

Langast (French pronunciation: [lɑ̃ɡa]; Breton: Lanwal; Gallo: Langau) is a former commune in the Côtes-d'Armor department of Brittany in northwestern France. On 1 January 2019, it was merged into the new commune Plouguenast-Langast. Inhabitants of Langast are called langastiens or langastais in French.

== See also ==
- Communes of the Côtes-d'Armor department
