= Plouguenast =

Commune in Côtes-d'Armor, France

Plouguenast Plougonwaz
- Part of Plouguenast-Langast
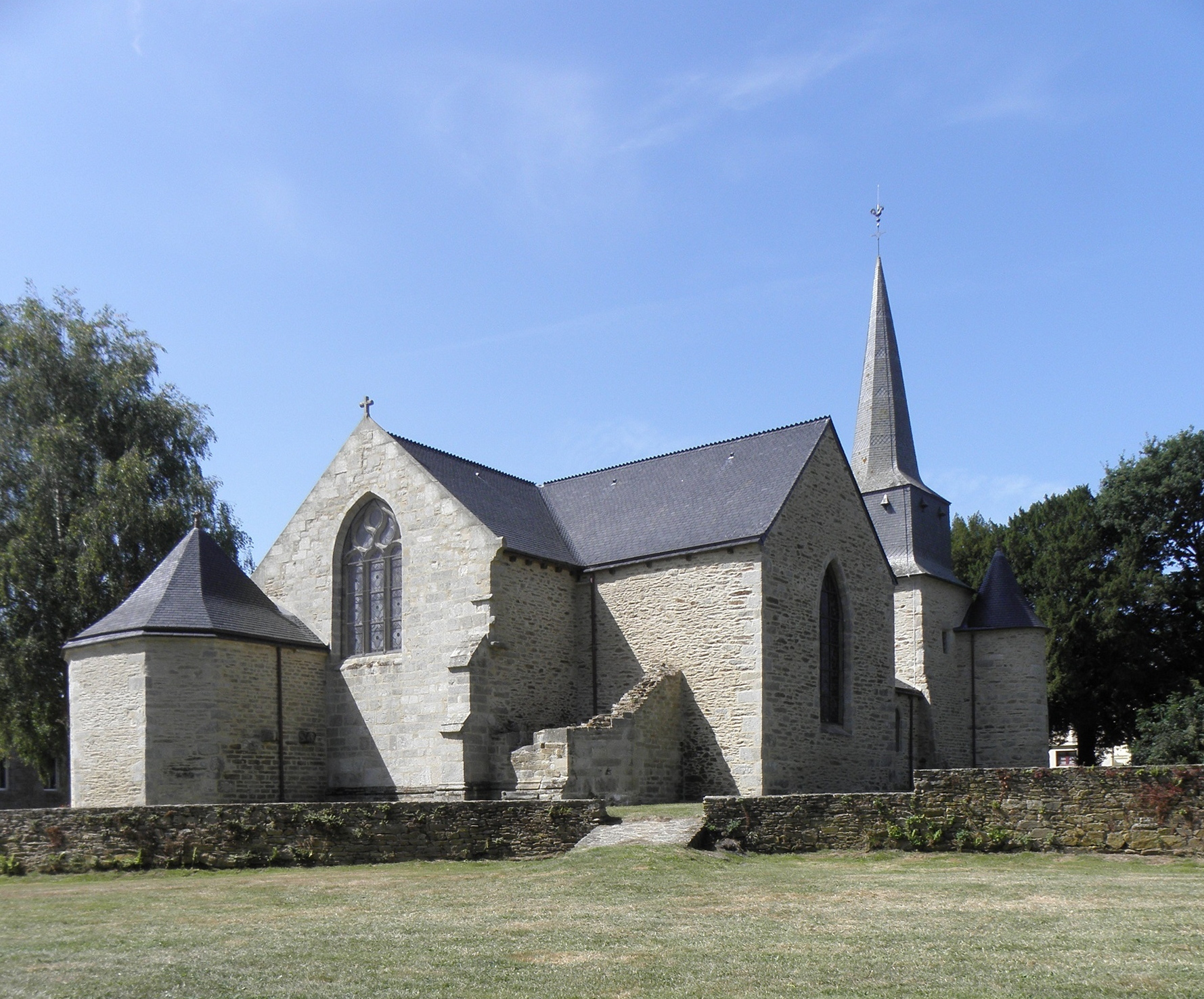
- The church of the old village, in Plouguenast

- Coat of arms
- Location of Plouguenast
- Location within France Location within Brittany
- Coordinates: 48°16′56″N 2°42′11″W
- Country: France
- Region: Brittany
- Department: Côtes-d'Armor
- Arrondissement: Saint-Brieuc
- Canton: Guerlédan
- Commune: Plouguenast-Langast
- Area^{1}: 35.12 km^{2} (13.56 sq mi)
- Highest elevation: 253 m (830 ft)
- Lowest elevation: 112 m (367 ft)
- Population (2022): 1,825
  - Density: 51.96/km^{2} (134.6/sq mi)
- Time zone: UTC+01:00 (CET)
  - Summer (DST): UTC+02:00 (CEST)
- Postal code: 22150
- ^{1} French Land Register data, which excludes lakes, ponds, glaciers > 1 km^{2} (0.386 sq mi or 247 acres) and river estuaries.

Plouguenast (French pronunciation: [pluɡna]; Breton: Plougonwaz; Gallo: Ploegenas) is a former commune in the Côtes-d'Armor department of Brittany in northwestern France. On 1 January 2019, it was merged into the new commune Plouguenast-Langast.

== Climate ==
Plouguenast has an oceanic climate (Köppen climate classification Cfb). The average annual temperature in Plouguenast is 11.0 °C (51.8 °F). The average annual rainfall is 966.8 mm (38.06 in) with January as the wettest month. The temperatures are highest on average in August, at around 17.5 °C (63.5 °F), and lowest in January, at around 5.3 °C (41.5 °F). The highest temperature ever recorded in Plouguenast was 36.9 °C (98.4 °F) on 9 August 2003; the coldest temperature ever recorded was −12.4 °C (9.7 °F) on 2 January 1997.

Climate data for Plouguenast (1981–2010 averages, extremes 1987−present)
| Month | Jan | Feb | Mar | Apr | May | Jun | Jul | Aug | Sep | Oct | Nov | Dec | Year |
|---|---|---|---|---|---|---|---|---|---|---|---|---|---|
| Record high °C (°F) | 17.4 (63.3) | 20.7 (69.3) | 22.9 (73.2) | 26.3 (79.3) | 29.5 (85.1) | 32.9 (91.2) | 35.6 (96.1) | 36.9 (98.4) | 30.2 (86.4) | 27.5 (81.5) | 19.8 (67.6) | 15.6 (60.1) | 36.9 (98.4) |
| Mean daily maximum °C (°F) | 7.8 (46.0) | 8.7 (47.7) | 11.3 (52.3) | 13.3 (55.9) | 16.9 (62.4) | 20.0 (68.0) | 22.0 (71.6) | 22.4 (72.3) | 19.6 (67.3) | 15.3 (59.5) | 10.8 (51.4) | 7.9 (46.2) | 14.7 (58.5) |
| Daily mean °C (°F) | 5.3 (41.5) | 5.8 (42.4) | 7.8 (46.0) | 9.3 (48.7) | 12.6 (54.7) | 15.3 (59.5) | 17.2 (63.0) | 17.5 (63.5) | 15.1 (59.2) | 11.9 (53.4) | 8.0 (46.4) | 5.4 (41.7) | 11.0 (51.8) |
| Mean daily minimum °C (°F) | 2.8 (37.0) | 2.9 (37.2) | 4.2 (39.6) | 5.2 (41.4) | 8.2 (46.8) | 10.6 (51.1) | 12.4 (54.3) | 12.5 (54.5) | 10.6 (51.1) | 8.5 (47.3) | 5.2 (41.4) | 3.0 (37.4) | 7.2 (45.0) |
| Record low °C (°F) | −12.4 (9.7) | −11.1 (12.0) | −5.6 (21.9) | −2.9 (26.8) | 0.0 (32.0) | 4.0 (39.2) | 6.8 (44.2) | 6.1 (43.0) | 3.5 (38.3) | −3.4 (25.9) | −5.0 (23.0) | −9.0 (15.8) | −12.4 (9.7) |
| Average precipitation mm (inches) | 117.1 (4.61) | 93.3 (3.67) | 72.7 (2.86) | 75.5 (2.97) | 65.1 (2.56) | 54.2 (2.13) | 55.2 (2.17) | 50.6 (1.99) | 70.1 (2.76) | 101.0 (3.98) | 101.3 (3.99) | 110.7 (4.36) | 966.8 (38.06) |
| Average precipitation days (≥ 1.0 mm) | 15.5 | 13.6 | 12.7 | 12.2 | 10.0 | 8.2 | 9.3 | 8.4 | 9.8 | 13.9 | 14.8 | 14.5 | 142.8 |
Source: Météo France

== Population ==
Inhabitants of Plouguenast are called plouguenastais in French.

Historical population
| Year | Pop. | ±% p.a. |
|---|---|---|
| 1968 | 1,943 | — |
| 1975 | 1,865 | −0.58% |
| 1982 | 1,821 | −0.34% |
| 1990 | 1,781 | −0.28% |
| 1999 | 1,719 | −0.39% |
| 2006 | 1,773 | +0.44% |
| 2022 | 1,825 | +0.18% |
Source: EHESS and INSEE

== See also ==
- Communes of the Côtes-d'Armor department
