= Le Haut-Corlay =

Le Haut-Corlay Ar Gozh-Korle
- Commune
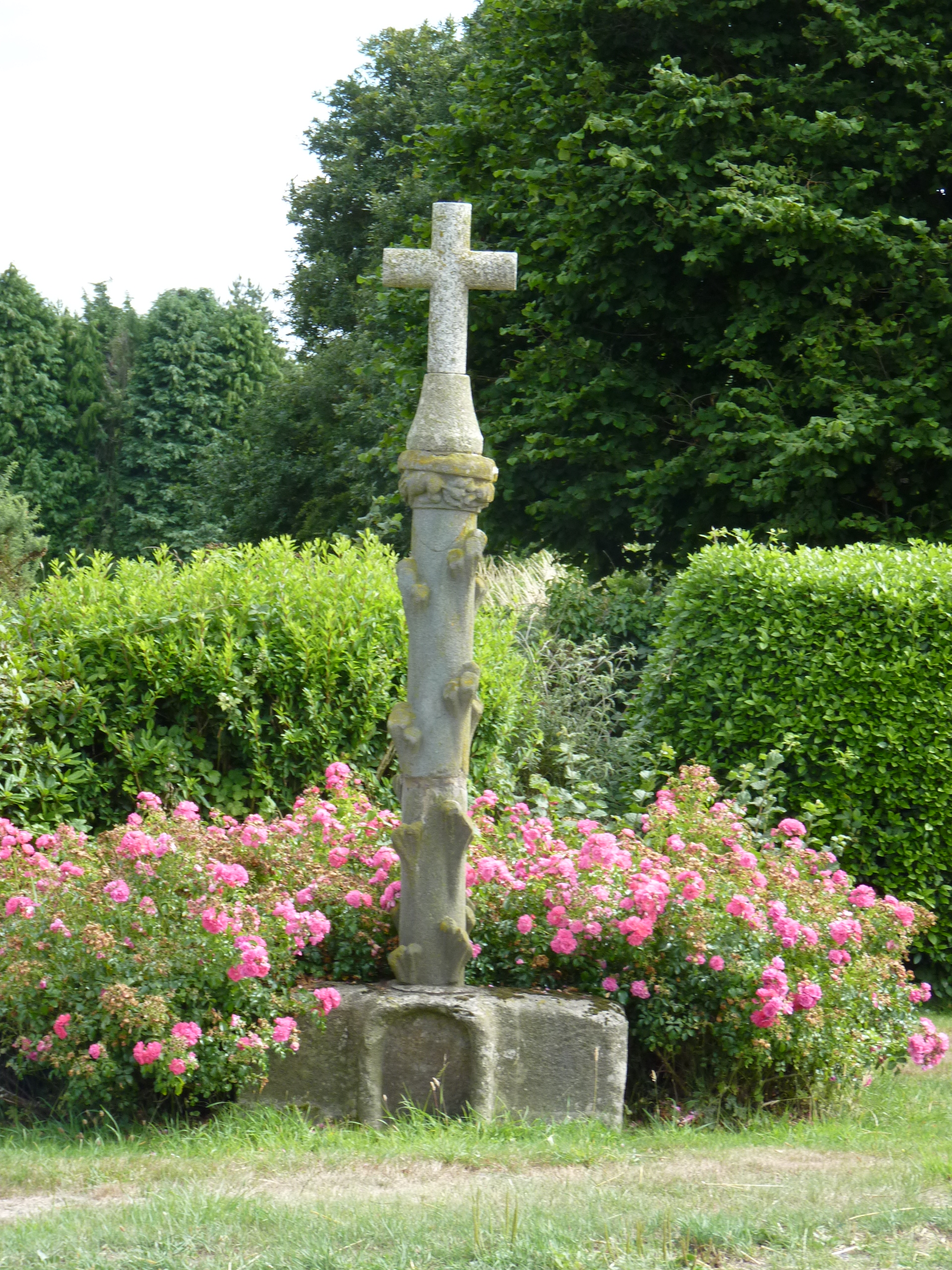
- The cross in Le Haut-Corlay
- Location of Le Haut-Corlay
- Location within France Location within Brittany
- Coordinates: 48°19′20″N 3°03′20″W
- Country: France
- Region: Brittany
- Department: Côtes-d'Armor
- Arrondissement: Saint-Brieuc
- Canton: Guerlédan
- Intercommunality: Loudéac Communauté - Bretagne Centre

Government
  - Mayor (2020–2026): Jean-Pierre Le Bihan
- Area^{1}: 25.64 km^{2} (9.90 sq mi)
- Highest elevation: 306 m (1,004 ft)
- Lowest elevation: 163 m (535 ft)
- Population (2023): 658
  - Density: 25.7/km^{2} (66.5/sq mi)
- Time zone: UTC+01:00 (CET)
  - Summer (DST): UTC+02:00 (CEST)
- INSEE/Postal code: 22074 /22320
- ^{1} French Land Register data, which excludes lakes, ponds, glaciers > 1 km^{2} (0.386 sq mi or 247 acres) and river estuaries.

Le Haut-Corlay (French pronunciation: [lə o kɔʁlɛ], literally The Upper Corlay; Breton: Ar Gozh-Korle) is a commune in the Côtes-d'Armor department of Brittany in northwestern France.

== Population ==
Historical population
Year	Pop.	±% p.a.
1968	851	—
1975	785	−1.15%
1982	751	−0.63%
1990	734	−0.29%
1999	714	−0.31%
2007	706	−0.14%
2012	690	−0.46%
2017	659	−0.92%
2023	658	−0.03%
Source: INSEE

Inhabitants of Le Haut-Corlay are called haut-corlaysiens in French.

== See also ==
- Communes of the Côtes-d'Armor department
