= Caurel =

Caurel is the name of the following communes of France:

- Caurel, Côtes-d'Armor, in the Côtes-d'Armor department
- Caurel, Marne, in the Marne department
