= Hémonstoir =

Hémonstoir Henvoustoer
- Commune
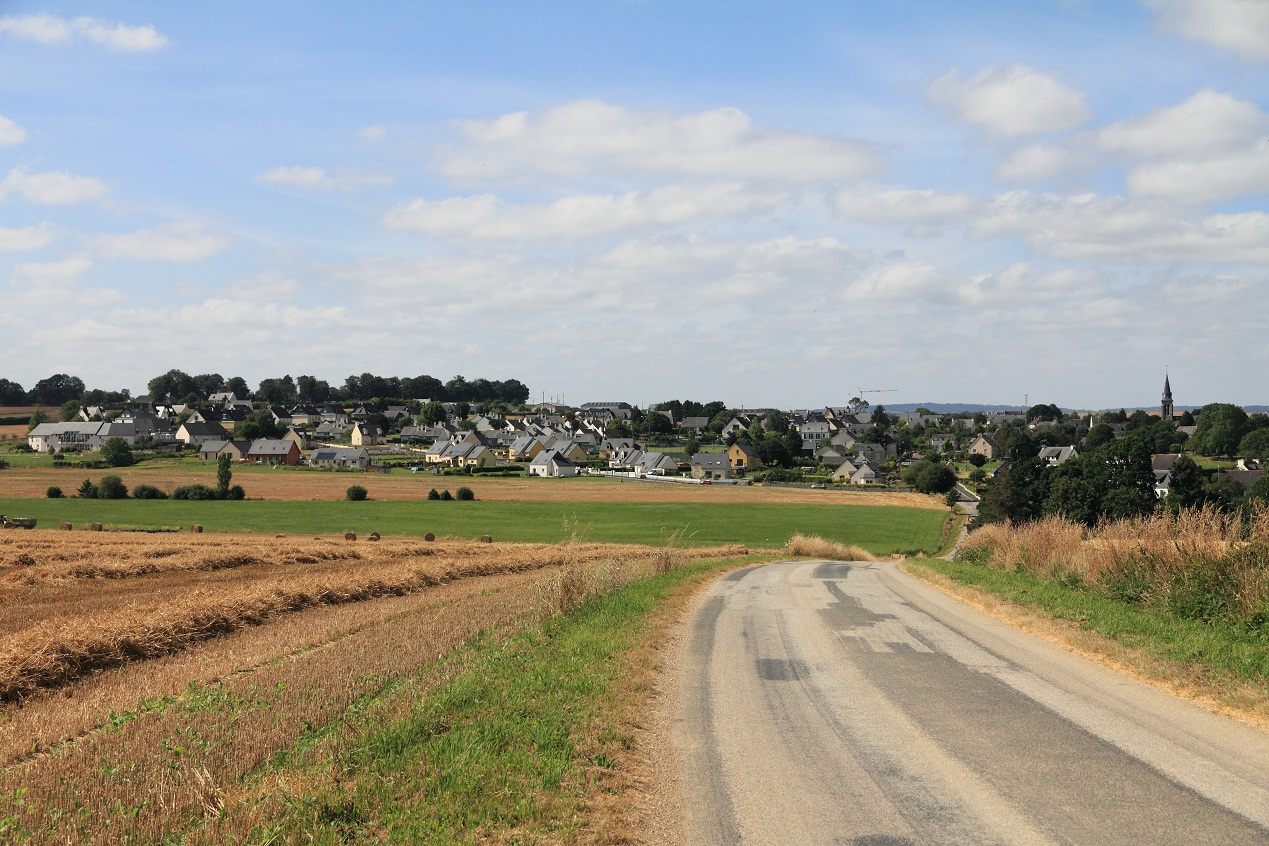
- A general view of Hémonstoir
- Location of Hémonstoir
- Location within France Location within Brittany
- Coordinates: 48°09′34″N 2°49′47″W
- Country: France
- Region: Brittany
- Department: Côtes-d'Armor
- Arrondissement: Saint-Brieuc
- Canton: Guerlédan
- Intercommunality: Loudéac Communauté - Bretagne Centre

Government
  - Mayor (2020–2026): Benoît Larvor
- Area^{1}: 14.03 km^{2} (5.42 sq mi)
- Highest elevation: 166 m (545 ft)
- Lowest elevation: 77 m (253 ft)
- Population (2023): 687
  - Density: 49.0/km^{2} (127/sq mi)
- Time zone: UTC+01:00 (CET)
  - Summer (DST): UTC+02:00 (CEST)
- INSEE/Postal code: 22075 /22600
- ^{1} French Land Register data, which excludes lakes, ponds, glaciers > 1 km^{2} (0.386 sq mi or 247 acres) and river estuaries.

Hémonstoir (French pronunciation: [emɔ̃stwaʁ]; Breton: Henvoustoer; Gallo: Hémontoèr) is a commune in the Côtes-d'Armor department of Brittany in northwestern France.

== Population ==
Historical population
Year	Pop.	±% p.a.
1968	470	—
1975	561	+2.56%
1982	676	+2.70%
1990	671	−0.09%
1999	639	−0.54%
2007	658	+0.37%
2012	698	+1.19%
2017	715	+0.48%
2023	687	−0.66%
Source: INSEE

Inhabitants of Hémonstoir are called hémonstoiriens in French.

== See also ==
- Communes of the Côtes-d'Armor department
