= Saint-Connec =

Saint-Connec Sant-Koneg
- Commune
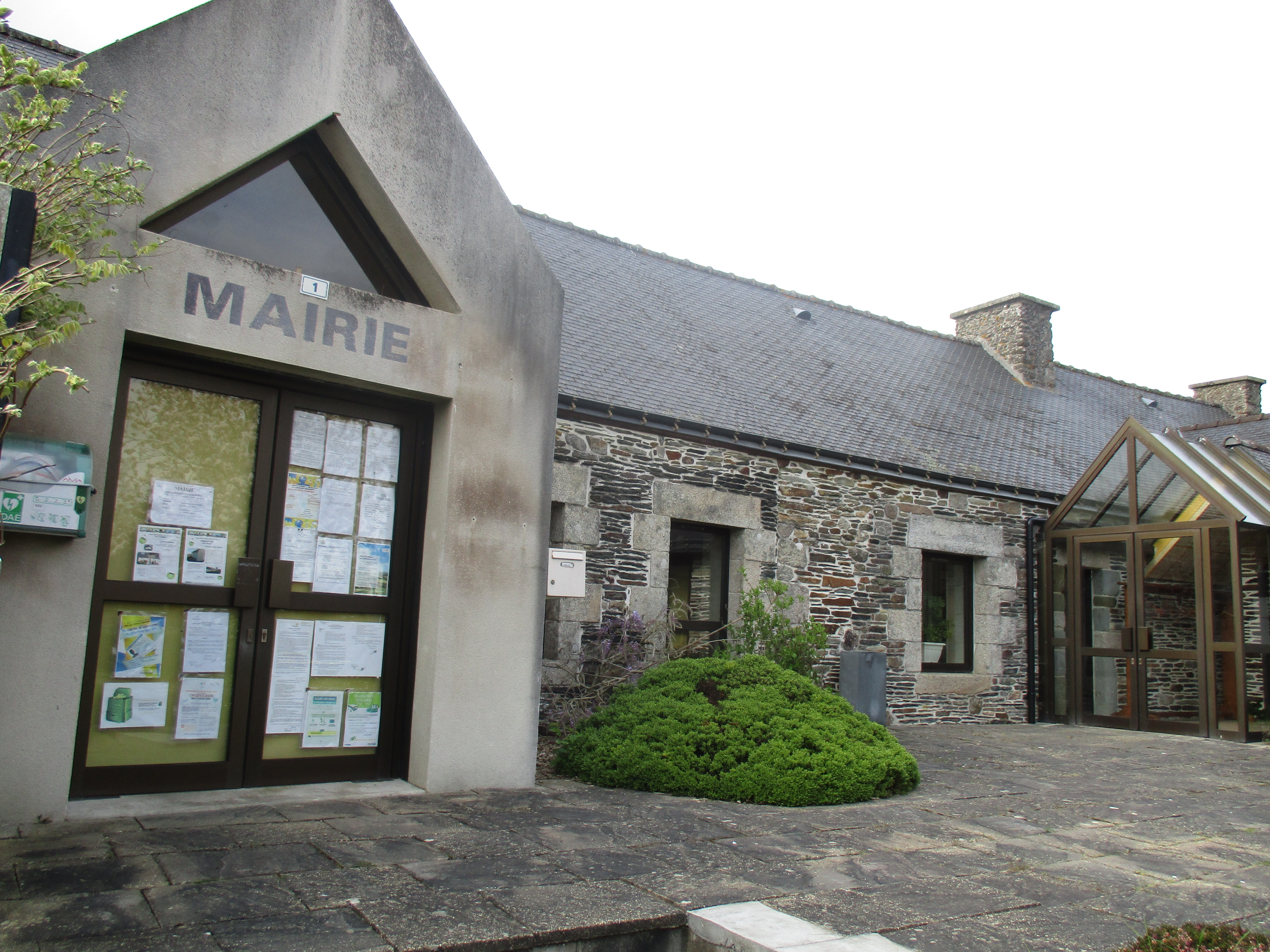
- Town hall.
- Location of Saint-Connec
- Location within France Location within Brittany
- Coordinates: 48°10′42″N 2°55′12″W
- Country: France
- Region: Brittany
- Department: Côtes-d'Armor
- Arrondissement: Saint-Brieuc
- Canton: Guerlédan

Government
  - Mayor (2020–2026): Rolland Le Lostec
- Area^{1}: 10.93 km^{2} (4.22 sq mi)
- Highest elevation: 170 m (560 ft)
- Lowest elevation: 89 m (292 ft)
- Population (2023): 258
  - Density: 23.6/km^{2} (61.1/sq mi)
- Time zone: UTC+01:00 (CET)
  - Summer (DST): UTC+02:00 (CEST)
- INSEE/Postal code: 22285 /22530
- ^{1} French Land Register data, which excludes lakes, ponds, glaciers > 1 km^{2} (0.386 sq mi or 247 acres) and river estuaries.

Saint-Connec (French pronunciation: [sɛ̃ kɔnɛk]; Breton: Sant-Koneg) is a commune in the Côtes-d'Armor department of Brittany in northwestern France.

== Population ==
Inhabitants of Saint-Connec are called saint-connecois in French.

== See also ==
- Communes of the Côtes-d'Armor department
