= Quelfénnec =

Coordinates: 48°15′23″N 3°03′10″W

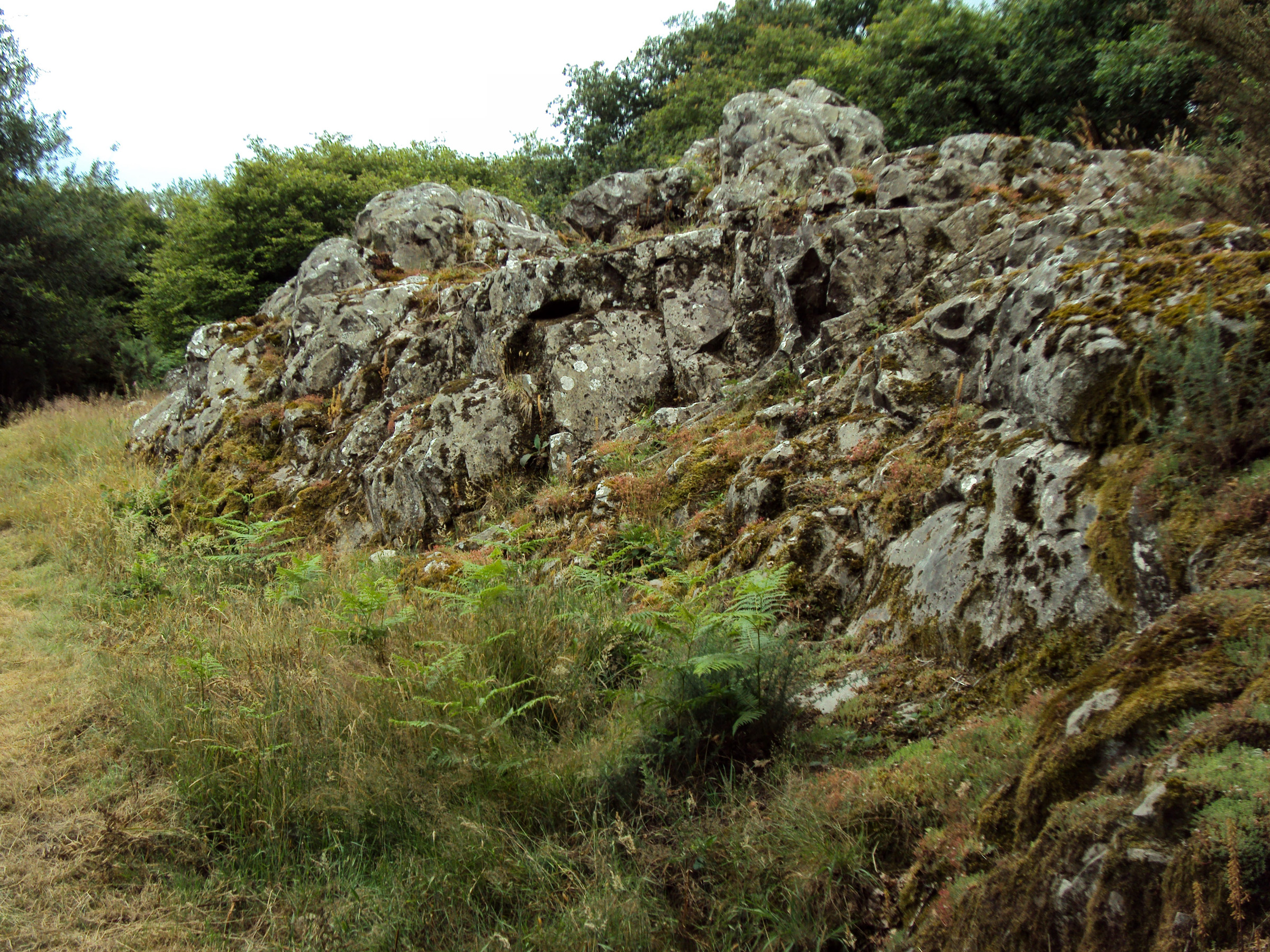

- Quelfénnec (France)
- Periods: Neolithic
- Location: Plussulien, Brittany

Site notes
- Excavation dates: 1964 - 1976
- Discovered: 1964
- Public access: Yes

Quelfénnec is an archaeological site in the French commune of Plussulien, in the Côtes-d'Armor department of Brittany. Discovered in 1964 by retired French Historian Charles-Tanguy Le Roux, excavation of the site started upon discovery and continued until 1976.

== Archeology ==
The site is a dolerite quarry which was exploited in the Neolithic period, from 3500 BC to 1800 BC, for the production of polished stone tools.

This production is estimated at 5,000 axes per year, various other tools besides axes were produced and widely exported beyond the limits of Armorica. Quelfennec's axes have been found throughout western France (from Normandy to Languedoc), but also in North-West Europe, the British Isles, and Belgium, These polished stone axes were used to carry out deforestation to allow for the expansion of agriculture. It is the particular hardness of dolerite, without excessive brittleness, which explains its particular interest in making axes and adzes (hatchets with curved edges like the muzzle of an ermine) but also strikers.

By around 2000 BC the site gradually went out of use with the introduction of metal tools, which ultimately replaced their stone predecessors.
