= Allineuc =

Allineuc Alineg (Breton)
- Commune
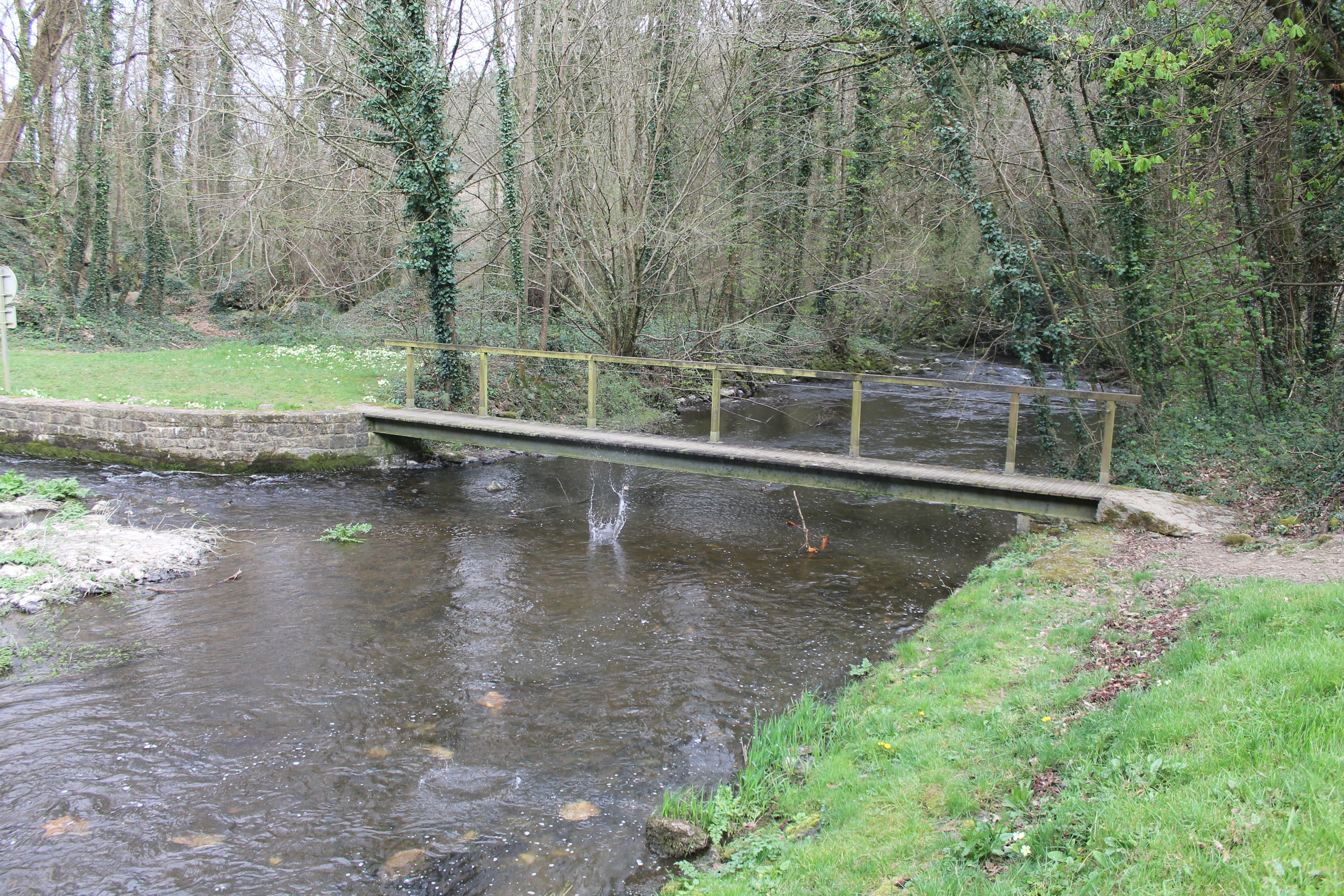
- Location of Allineuc
- Location within France Location within Brittany
- Coordinates: 48°18′41″N 2°52′17″W
- Country: France
- Region: Brittany
- Department: Côtes-d'Armor
- Arrondissement: Saint-Brieuc
- Canton: Guerlédan

Government
  - Mayor (2020–2026): Yohann Hervo
- Area^{1}: 24.09 km^{2} (9.30 sq mi)
- Highest elevation: 271 m (889 ft)
- Lowest elevation: 124 m (407 ft)
- Population (2023): 589
  - Density: 24.4/km^{2} (63.3/sq mi)
- Time zone: UTC+01:00 (CET)
  - Summer (DST): UTC+02:00 (CEST)
- INSEE/Postal code: 22001 /22460
- ^{1} French Land Register data, which excludes lakes, ponds, glaciers > 1 km^{2} (0.386 sq mi or 247 acres) and river estuaries.

Allineuc (French pronunciation: [alinœk]; Breton: Alineg; Gallo: Aleinoec) is a commune in the Côtes-d'Armor department of Brittany in north-western France.

== Population ==
Historical population
Year	Pop.	±% p.a.
1968	744	—
1975	660	−1.70%
1982	608	−1.17%
1990	545	−1.36%
1999	497	−1.02%
2007	505	+0.20%
2012	593	+3.26%
2017	604	+0.37%
2023	589	−0.42%
Source: INSEE

Inhabitants of Allineuc are called Allineucois in French.

== See also ==
- Communes of the Côtes-d'Armor department
