= Saint-Hervé =

Saint-Hervé Sant-Herve
- Commune
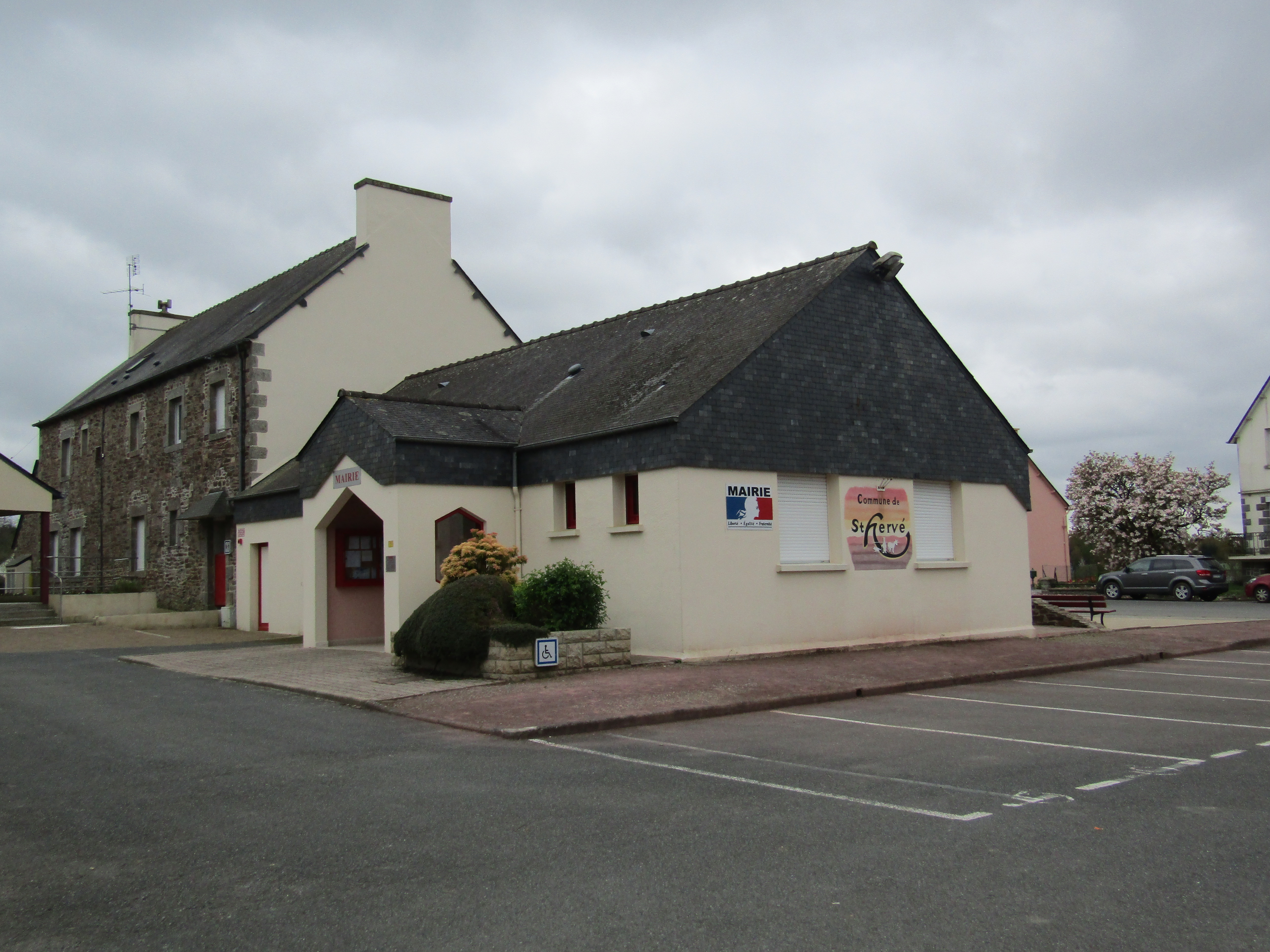
- Town hall
- Location of Saint-Hervé
- Location within France Location within Brittany
- Coordinates: 48°16′40″N 2°49′35″W
- Country: France
- Region: Brittany
- Department: Côtes-d'Armor
- Arrondissement: Saint-Brieuc
- Canton: Guerlédan

Government
  - Mayor (2020–2026): Nicole Le Couédic
- Area^{1}: 9.83 km^{2} (3.80 sq mi)
- Highest elevation: 262 m (860 ft)
- Lowest elevation: 138 m (453 ft)
- Population (2023): 425
  - Density: 43.2/km^{2} (112/sq mi)
- Time zone: UTC+01:00 (CET)
  - Summer (DST): UTC+02:00 (CEST)
- INSEE/Postal code: 22300 /22460
- ^{1} French Land Register data, which excludes lakes, ponds, glaciers > 1 km^{2} (0.386 sq mi or 247 acres) and river estuaries.

Saint-Hervé (Breton: Sant-Herve) is a commune in the Côtes-d'Armor département of Brittany in northwestern France.

== Population ==
Historical population
Year	Pop.	±% p.a.
1968	435	—
1975	378	−1.99%
1982	414	+1.31%
1990	409	−0.15%
1999	397	−0.33%
2007	386	−0.35%
2012	421	+1.75%
2017	400	−1.02%
2023	425	+1.02%
Source: INSEE

== See also ==
- Communes of the Côtes-d'Armor department
