= Saint-Gilles-Vieux-Marché =

Saint-Gilles-Vieux-Marché Sant-Jili-ar-C'hozhvarc'had
- Commune
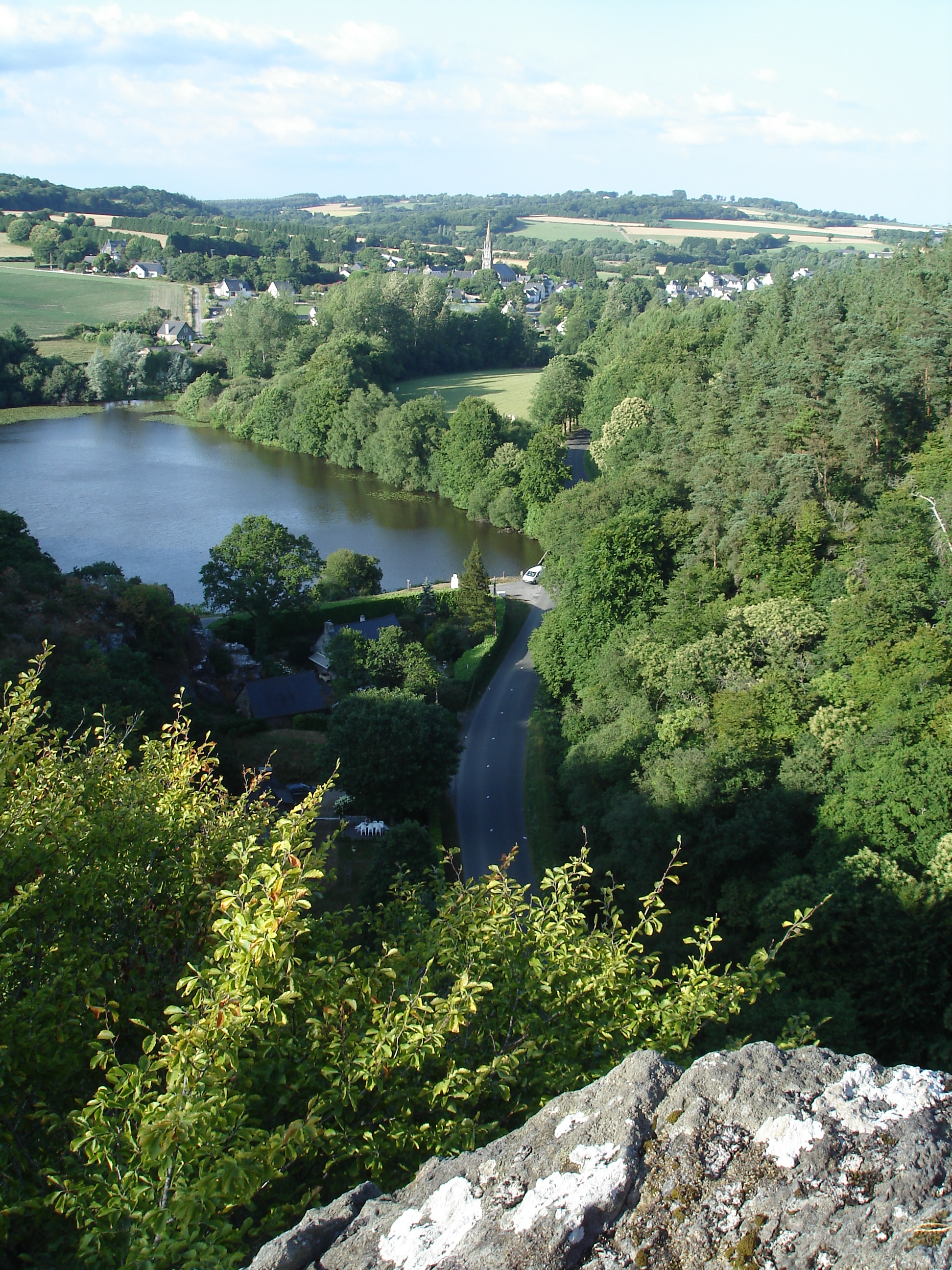
- The village and Poulancre lake

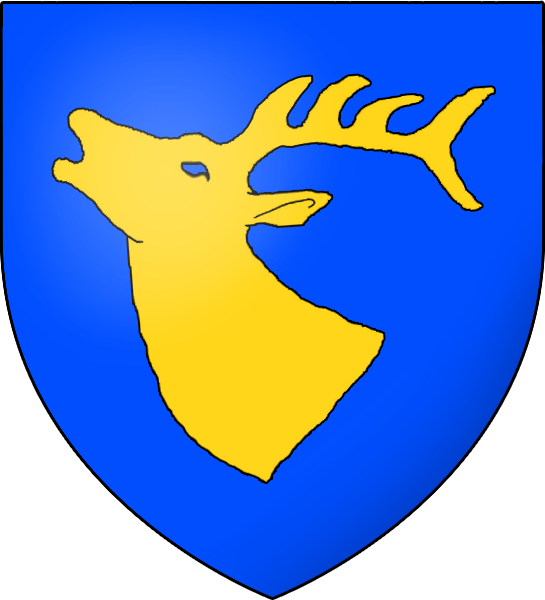
- Coat of arms
- Location of Saint-Gilles-Vieux-Marché
- Location within France Location within Brittany
- Coordinates: 48°14′38″N 2°58′23″W
- Country: France
- Region: Brittany
- Department: Côtes-d'Armor
- Arrondissement: Saint-Brieuc
- Canton: Guerlédan

Government
  - Mayor (2020–2026): Laurent Bertho
- Area^{1}: 21.95 km^{2} (8.47 sq mi)
- Highest elevation: 311 m (1,020 ft)
- Lowest elevation: 110 m (360 ft)
- Population (2023): 307
  - Density: 14.0/km^{2} (36.2/sq mi)
- Time zone: UTC+01:00 (CET)
  - Summer (DST): UTC+02:00 (CEST)
- INSEE/Postal code: 22295 /22530
- ^{1} French Land Register data, which excludes lakes, ponds, glaciers > 1 km^{2} (0.386 sq mi or 247 acres) and river estuaries.

Saint-Gilles-Vieux-Marché (French pronunciation: [sɛ̃ ʒil vjø maʁʃe]; Breton: Sant-Jili-ar-C'hozhvarc'had) is a commune in the Côtes-d'Armor department of Brittany in northwestern France.

== Population ==
People from Saint-Gilles-Vieux-Marché are called saint-gillois in French.

== See also ==
- Communes of the Côtes-d'Armor department
