= Saint-Caradec =

Saint-Caradec Sant-Karadeg
- Commune
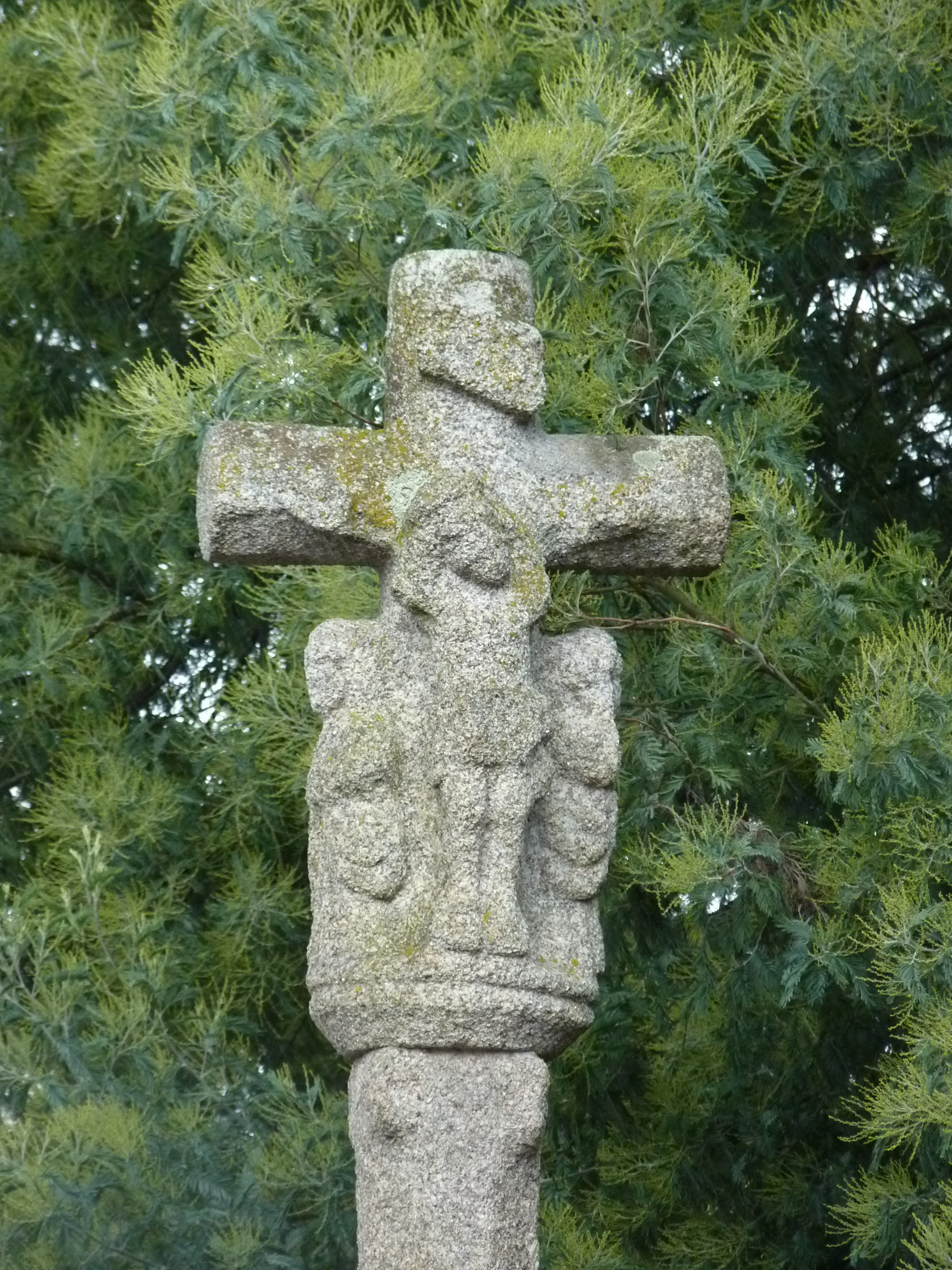
- The 18th century cross, in Saint-Caradec

- Coat of arms
- Location of Saint-Caradec
- Location within France Location within Brittany
- Coordinates: 48°11′30″N 2°50′53″W
- Country: France
- Region: Brittany
- Department: Côtes-d'Armor
- Arrondissement: Saint-Brieuc
- Canton: Guerlédan
- Intercommunality: Loudéac Communauté - Bretagne Centre

Government
  - Mayor (2020–2026): Alain Guillaume
- Area^{1}: 21.94 km^{2} (8.47 sq mi)
- Highest elevation: 191 m (627 ft)
- Lowest elevation: 84 m (276 ft)
- Population (2023): 1,132
  - Density: 51.60/km^{2} (133.6/sq mi)
- Time zone: UTC+01:00 (CET)
  - Summer (DST): UTC+02:00 (CEST)
- INSEE/Postal code: 22279 /22600
- ^{1} French Land Register data, which excludes lakes, ponds, glaciers > 1 km^{2} (0.386 sq mi or 247 acres) and river estuaries.

Saint-Caradec (French pronunciation: [sɛ̃ kaʁadɛk]; Breton: Sant-Karadeg; Gallo: Saent-Caradéc) is a commune in the Côtes-d'Armor department of Brittany in northwestern France.

== Population ==
The people of Saint-Caradec are called caradocéens in French.

== See also ==
- Communes of the Côtes-d'Armor department
