= Saint-Thélo =

Saint-Thélo Sant-Teliav
- Commune
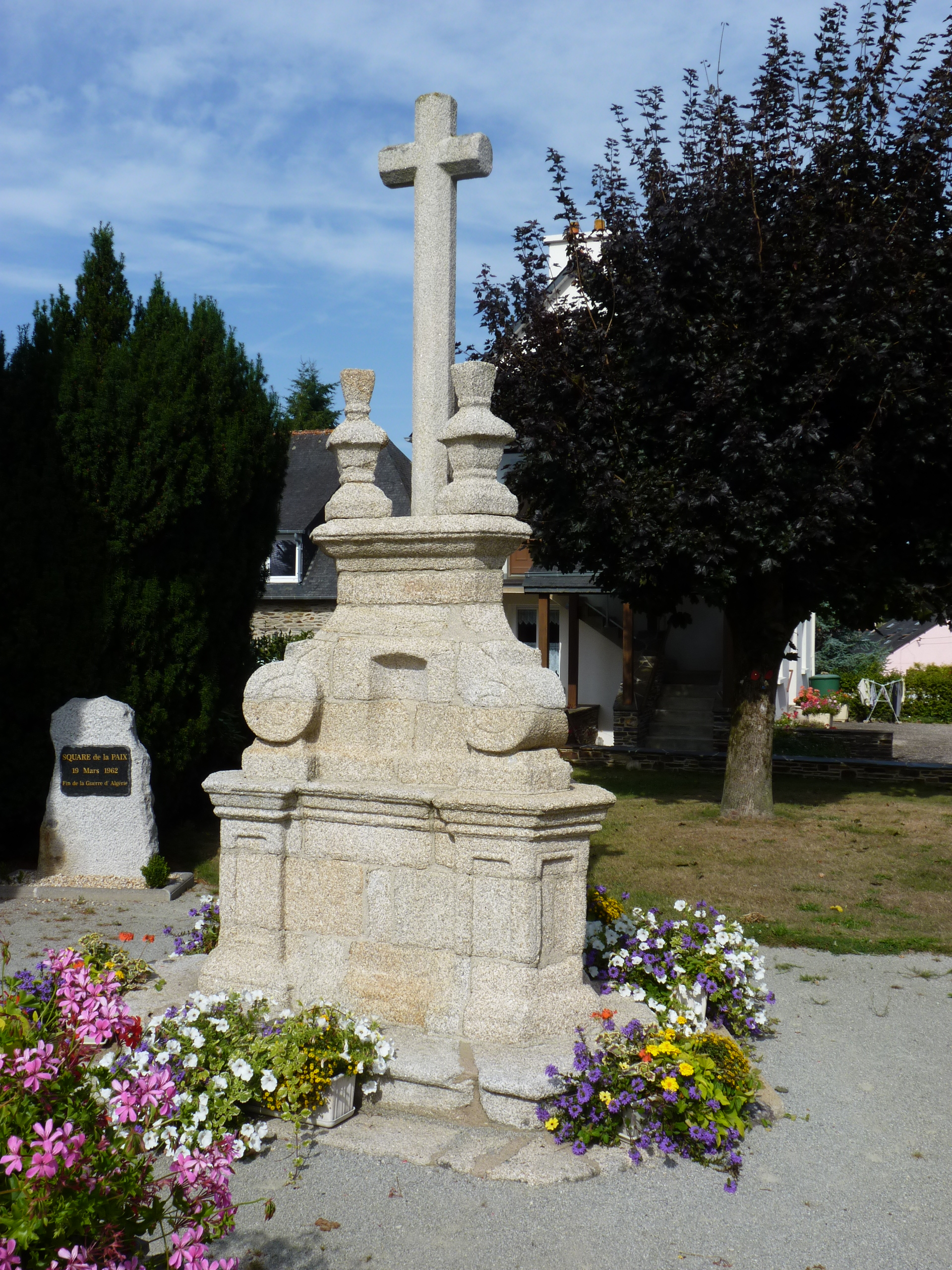
- The 18th century cemetery cross, in Saint-Thélo
- Location of Saint-Thélo
- Location within France Location within Brittany
- Coordinates: 48°13′45″N 2°51′10″W
- Country: France
- Region: Brittany
- Department: Côtes-d'Armor
- Arrondissement: Saint-Brieuc
- Canton: Guerlédan
- Intercommunality: Loudéac Communauté - Bretagne Centre

Government
  - Mayor (2023–2026): Anne-Laure Duedal
- Area^{1}: 14.56 km^{2} (5.62 sq mi)
- Highest elevation: 227 m (745 ft)
- Lowest elevation: 97 m (318 ft)
- Population (2023): 371
  - Density: 25.5/km^{2} (66.0/sq mi)
- Time zone: UTC+01:00 (CET)
  - Summer (DST): UTC+02:00 (CEST)
- INSEE/Postal code: 22330 /22460
- ^{1} French Land Register data, which excludes lakes, ponds, glaciers > 1 km^{2} (0.386 sq mi or 247 acres) and river estuaries.

Saint-Thélo (French pronunciation: [sɛ̃ telo]; Breton: Sant-Teliav) is a commune in the Côtes-d'Armor department of Brittany in northwestern France.

== Population ==
Historical population
Year	Pop.	±% p.a.
1968	676	—
1975	554	−2.80%
1982	531	−0.60%
1990	458	−1.83%
1999	444	−0.34%
2007	437	−0.20%
2012	420	−0.79%
2017	420	+0.00%
2023	371	−2.05%
Source: INSEE

Inhabitants of Saint-Thélo are called thélossiens in French.

== See also ==
- Communes of the Côtes-d'Armor department
