= Saint-Martin-des-Prés =

Saint-Martin-des-Prés Sant-Varzhin-Korle
- Commune
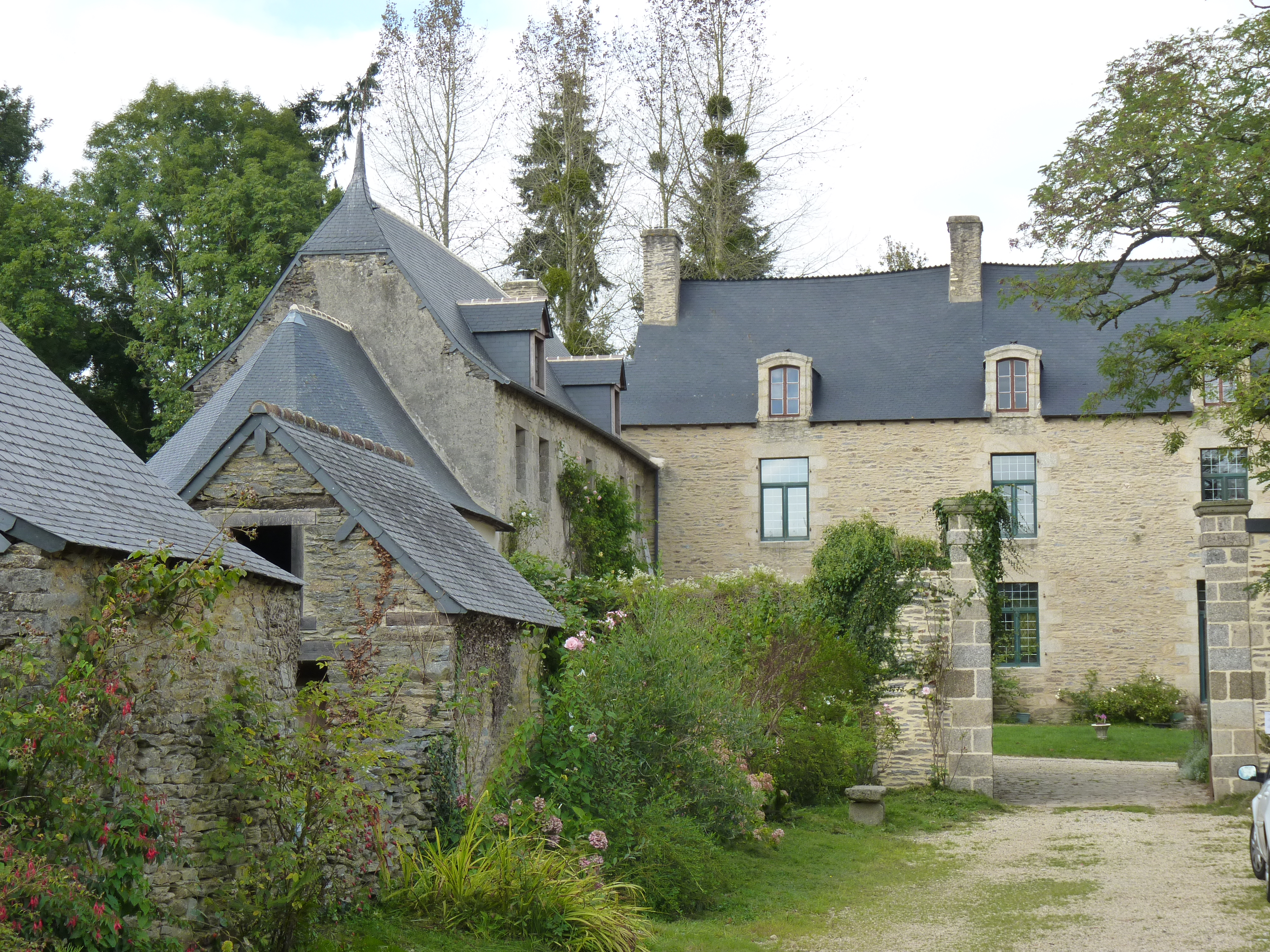
- Cléhunault Manor
- Location of Saint-Martin-des-Prés
- Location within France Location within Brittany
- Coordinates: 48°18′28″N 2°57′11″W
- Country: France
- Region: Brittany
- Department: Côtes-d'Armor
- Arrondissement: Saint-Brieuc
- Canton: Guerlédan

Government
  - Mayor (2020–2026): Christian Le Riguier
- Area^{1}: 20.30 km^{2} (7.84 sq mi)
- Highest elevation: 322 m (1,056 ft)
- Lowest elevation: 166 m (545 ft)
- Population (2023): 319
  - Density: 15.7/km^{2} (40.7/sq mi)
- Time zone: UTC+01:00 (CET)
  - Summer (DST): UTC+02:00 (CEST)
- INSEE/Postal code: 22313 /22320
- ^{1} French Land Register data, which excludes lakes, ponds, glaciers > 1 km^{2} (0.386 sq mi or 247 acres) and river estuaries.

Saint-Martin-des-Prés (French pronunciation: [sɛ̃ maʁtɛ̃ de pʁe]; Breton: Sant-Varzhin-Korle) is a commune in the Côtes-d'Armor department of Brittany in northwestern France.

== Population ==
Historical population
Year	Pop.	±% p.a.
1968	592	—
1975	509	−2.13%
1982	416	−2.84%
1990	385	−0.96%
1999	366	−0.56%
2007	351	−0.52%
2012	331	−1.17%
2017	315	−0.99%
2023	319	+0.21%
Source: INSEE

People from Saint-Martin-des-Prés are called martinais in French.

== See also ==
- Communes of the Côtes-d'Armor department
