= Plussulien =

Plussulien Plusulian
- Commune
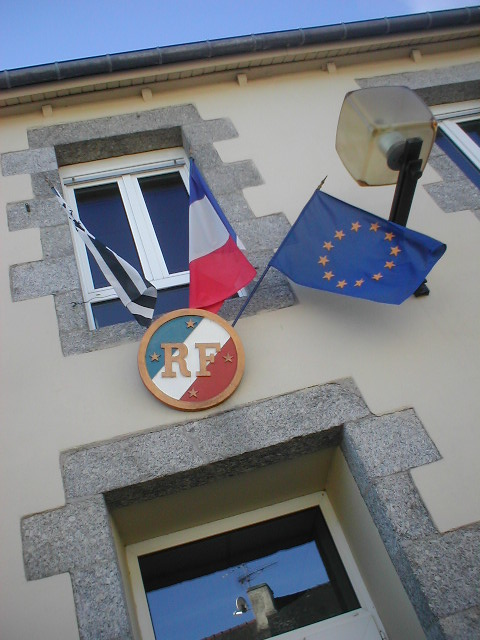
- Town hall
- Location of Plussulien
- Location within France Location within Brittany
- Coordinates: 48°17′01″N 3°04′09″W
- Country: France
- Region: Brittany
- Department: Côtes-d'Armor
- Arrondissement: Saint-Brieuc
- Canton: Guerlédan

Government
  - Mayor (2024–2026): Claudine Brossard
- Area^{1}: 22.49 km^{2} (8.68 sq mi)
- Highest elevation: 305 m (1,001 ft)
- Lowest elevation: 152 m (499 ft)
- Population (2023): 520
  - Density: 23/km^{2} (60/sq mi)
- Time zone: UTC+01:00 (CET)
  - Summer (DST): UTC+02:00 (CEST)
- INSEE/Postal code: 22244 /22320
- ^{1} French Land Register data, which excludes lakes, ponds, glaciers > 1 km^{2} (0.386 sq mi or 247 acres) and river estuaries.

Plussulien (French pronunciation: [plysyljɛ̃]; Breton: Plusulian) is a commune in the Côtes-d'Armor department of Brittany in northwestern France. It is home to the archeological site of Quelfénnec.

== Population ==
Historical population
Year	Pop.	±% p.a.
1968	761	—
1975	707	−1.05%
1982	660	−0.98%
1990	596	−1.27%
1999	515	−1.61%
2007	488	−0.67%
2012	508	+0.81%
2017	487	−0.84%
2023	520	+1.10%
Source: INSEE

Inhabitants of Plussulien are called plussulianais in French.

== See also ==
- Communes of the Côtes-d'Armor department
