= Saint-Mayeux =

Saint-Mayeux Sant-Vaeg
- Commune
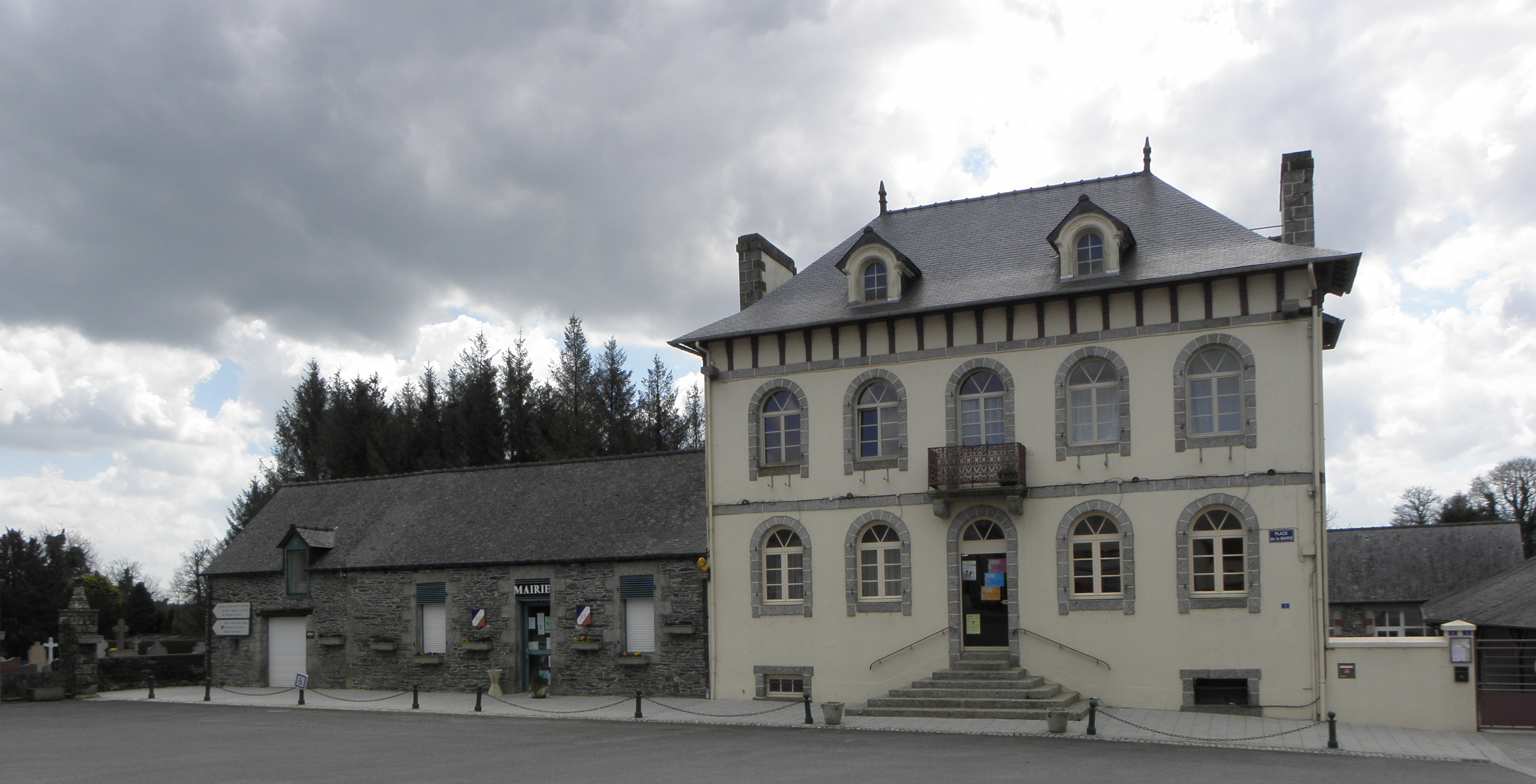
- The town hall of Saint-Mayeux
- Location of Saint-Mayeux
- Location within France Location within Brittany
- Coordinates: 48°15′24″N 3°00′17″W
- Country: France
- Region: Brittany
- Department: Côtes-d'Armor
- Arrondissement: Saint-Brieuc
- Canton: Guerlédan
- Intercommunality: Loudéac Communauté - Bretagne Centre

Government
  - Mayor (2020–2026): Gilles Hellard
- Area^{1}: 30.63 km^{2} (11.83 sq mi)
- Highest elevation: 316 m (1,037 ft)
- Lowest elevation: 189 m (620 ft)
- Population (2023): 454
  - Density: 14.8/km^{2} (38.4/sq mi)
- Time zone: UTC+01:00 (CET)
  - Summer (DST): UTC+02:00 (CEST)
- INSEE/Postal code: 22316 /22320
- ^{1} French Land Register data, which excludes lakes, ponds, glaciers > 1 km^{2} (0.386 sq mi or 247 acres) and river estuaries.

Saint-Mayeux (French pronunciation: [sɛ̃ majø]; Breton: Sant-Vaeg) is a commune in the Côtes-d'Armor department of Brittany in northwestern France.

== Demographics ==
Historical population
| Year | Pop. | ±% p.a. |
|---|---|---|
| 1968 | 874 | — |
| 1975 | 773 | −1.74% |
| 1982 | 664 | −2.15% |
| 1990 | 539 | −2.57% |
| 1999 | 484 | −1.19% |
| 2007 | 525 | +1.02% |
| 2012 | 503 | −0.85% |
| 2017 | 470 | −1.35% |
| 2023 | 454 | −0.58% |
Source: INSEE

Inhabitants of Saint-Mayeux are known in French as mayochins.

== Sights ==
- The church bell, reconstructed in 1730, previously said to have been at the Abbey of Bon Repos.
- Saint-Maurice chapel, its altarpiece is listed as historically significant and it has a "miraculous" font.
- The Roch ar lien, steeped in history and legend.
- The menhirs, Mein al has (French: la Pierre du chat) and Roch ar len (French: le Rocher du sommet)
- The tomb of the Gauls (a gallery grave, or Neolithic tomb)

== Personalities ==
- Jules-Charles Le Bozec, sculptor

== See also ==
- Communes of the Côtes-d'Armor department
