= Le Quillio =

Le Quillio Ar C'hillioù
- Commune
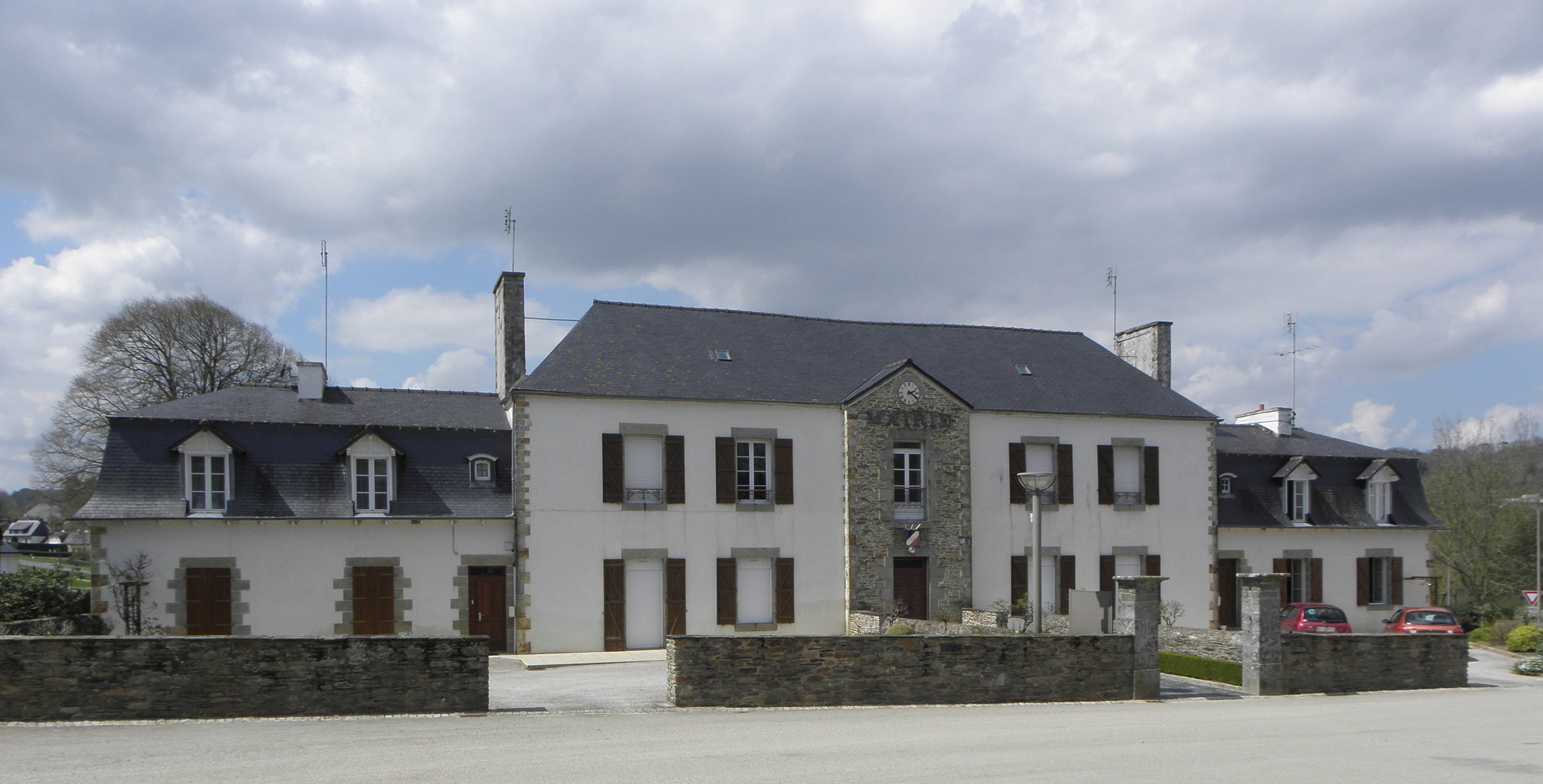
- The town hall in Le Quillio
- Location of Le Quillio
- Location within France Location within Brittany
- Coordinates: 48°14′30″N 2°52′56″W
- Country: France
- Region: Brittany
- Department: Côtes-d'Armor
- Arrondissement: Saint-Brieuc
- Canton: Guerlédan
- Intercommunality: Loudéac Communauté - Bretagne Centre

Government
  - Mayor (2020–2026): Xavier Hamon
- Area^{1}: 16.16 km^{2} (6.24 sq mi)
- Highest elevation: 297 m (974 ft)
- Lowest elevation: 100 m (330 ft)
- Population (2023): 597
  - Density: 36.9/km^{2} (95.7/sq mi)
- Time zone: UTC+01:00 (CET)
  - Summer (DST): UTC+02:00 (CEST)
- INSEE/Postal code: 22260 /22460
- ^{1} French Land Register data, which excludes lakes, ponds, glaciers > 1 km^{2} (0.386 sq mi or 247 acres) and river estuaries.

Le Quillio (French pronunciation: [lə kiljo]; Breton: Ar C'hillioù) is a commune in the Côtes-d'Armor department of Brittany in northwestern France.

== Population ==
Historical population
Year	Pop.	±% p.a.
1968	706	—
1975	657	−1.02%
1982	613	−0.99%
1990	542	−1.53%
1999	554	+0.24%
2007	539	−0.34%
2012	549	+0.37%
2017	555	+0.22%
2023	597	+1.22%
Source: INSEE

Inhabitants of Le Quillio are called quilliotais in French.

== See also ==
- Communes of the Côtes-d'Armor department
