= Grâce-Uzel =

Grâce-Uzel Gras-Uzel
- Commune
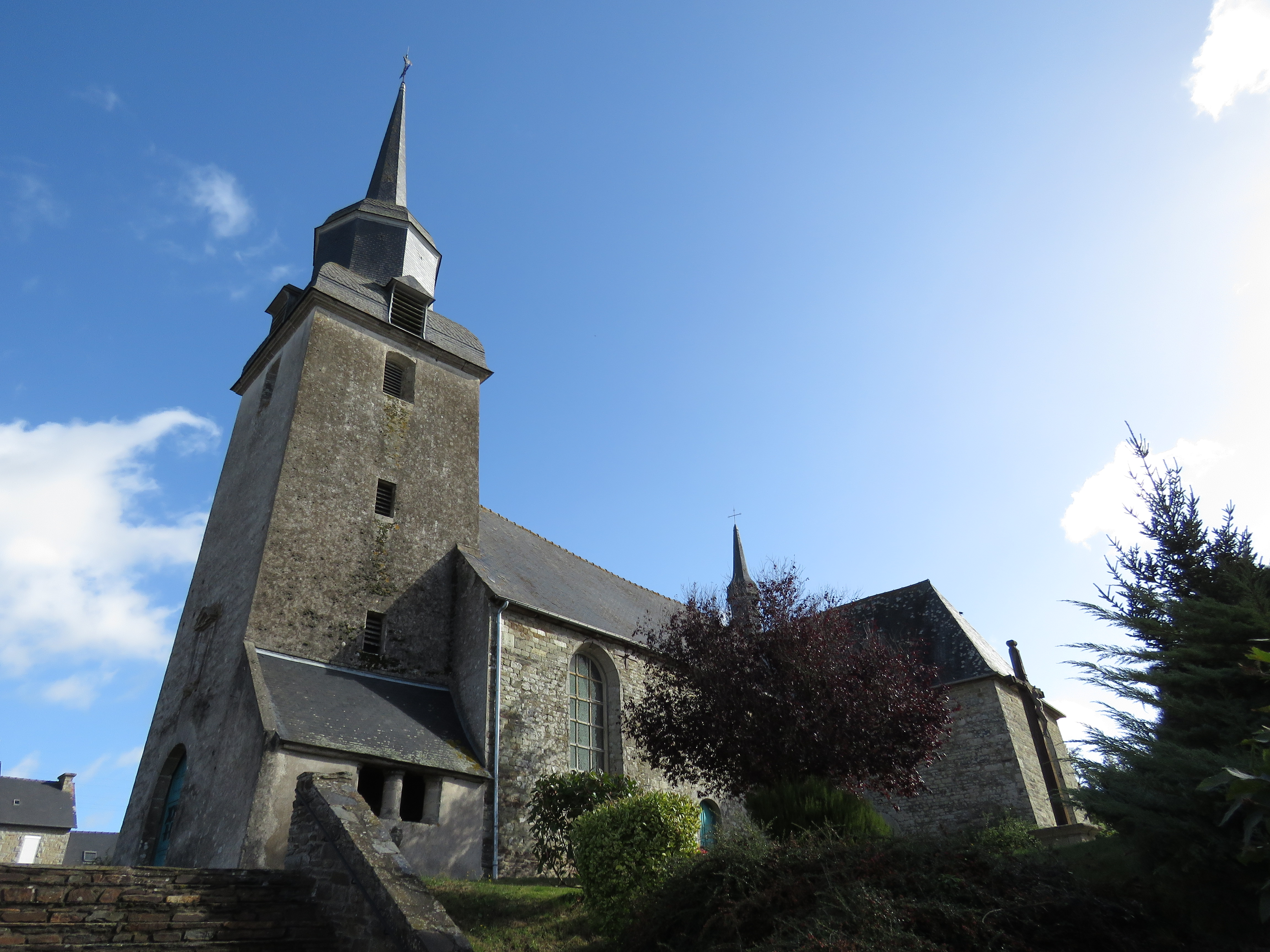
- The church of Notre-Dame
- Location of Grâce-Uzel
- Location within France Location within Brittany
- Coordinates: 48°14′32″N 2°47′58″W
- Country: France
- Region: Brittany
- Department: Côtes-d'Armor
- Arrondissement: Saint-Brieuc
- Canton: Guerlédan
- Intercommunality: Loudéac Communauté - Bretagne Centre

Government
  - Mayor (2020–2026): François Hindré
- Area^{1}: 7.95 km^{2} (3.07 sq mi)
- Highest elevation: 261 m (856 ft)
- Lowest elevation: 146 m (479 ft)
- Population (2023): 423
  - Density: 53.2/km^{2} (138/sq mi)
- Time zone: UTC+01:00 (CET)
  - Summer (DST): UTC+02:00 (CEST)
- INSEE/Postal code: 22068 /22460
- ^{1} French Land Register data, which excludes lakes, ponds, glaciers > 1 km^{2} (0.386 sq mi or 247 acres) and river estuaries.

Grâce-Uzel (French: [ɡʁɑs yzɛl]; Breton: Gras-Uzel) is a commune in the Côtes-d'Armor department of Brittany in northwestern France.

== Population ==
Historical population
Year	Pop.	±% p.a.
1968	435	—
1975	386	−1.69%
1982	365	−0.80%
1990	418	+1.71%
1999	401	−0.46%
2007	402	+0.03%
2012	423	+1.02%
2017	432	+0.42%
2023	423	−0.35%
Source: INSEE

Inhabitants of Grâce-Uzel are called gracieux in French.

== See also ==
- Communes of the Côtes-d'Armor department
