= Merléac =

Merléac Merleag
- Commune
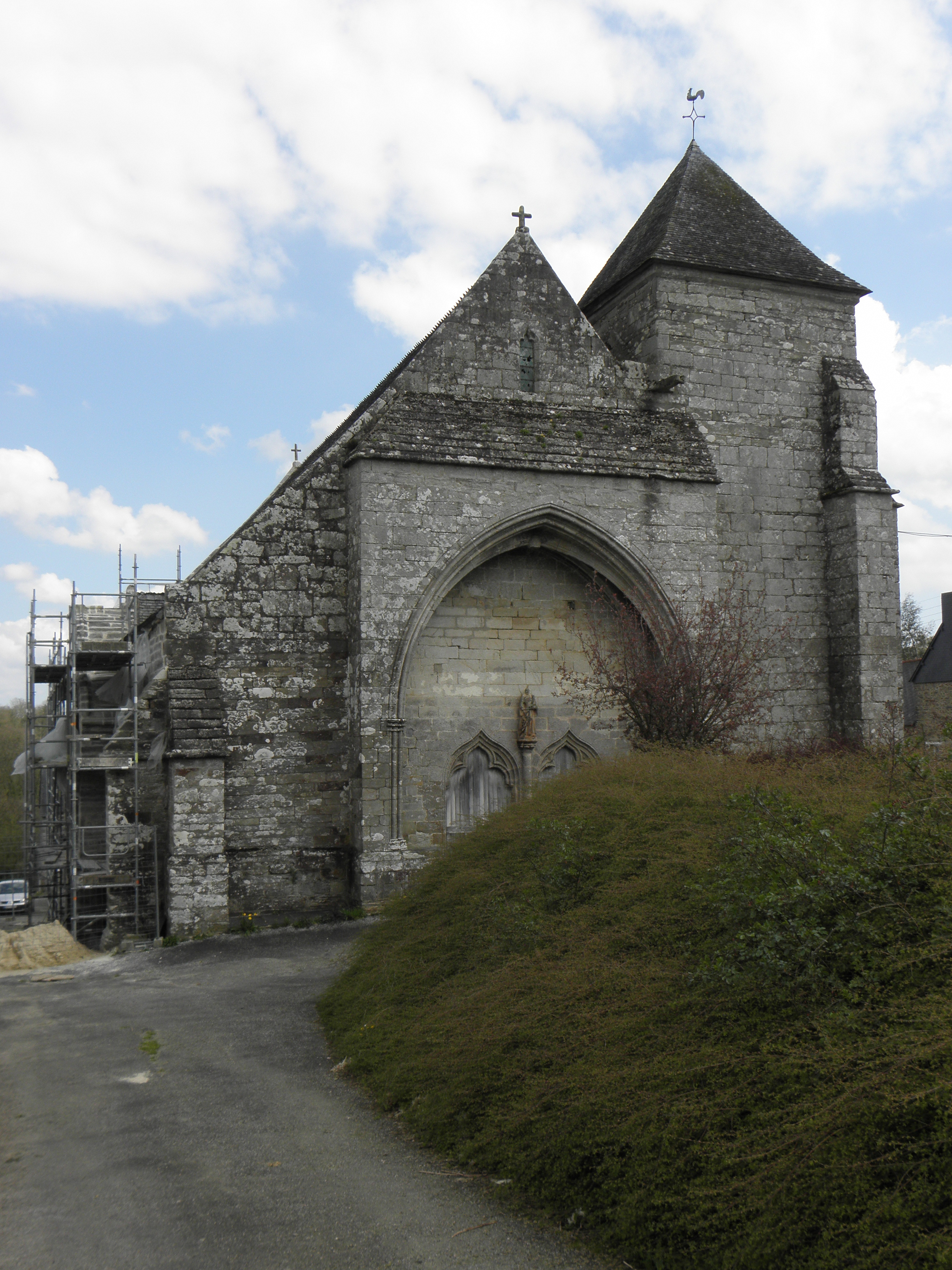
- The chapel of Saint-Jacques, in Merléac
- Location of Merléac
- Location within France Location within Brittany
- Coordinates: 48°16′41″N 2°53′51″W
- Country: France
- Region: Brittany
- Department: Côtes-d'Armor
- Arrondissement: Saint-Brieuc
- Canton: Guerlédan
- Intercommunality: Loudéac Communauté - Bretagne Centre

Government
  - Mayor (2020–2026): Joël Carrée
- Area^{1}: 30.03 km^{2} (11.59 sq mi)
- Highest elevation: 311 m (1,020 ft)
- Lowest elevation: 114 m (374 ft)
- Population (2023): 481
  - Density: 16.0/km^{2} (41.5/sq mi)
- Time zone: UTC+01:00 (CET)
  - Summer (DST): UTC+02:00 (CEST)
- INSEE/Postal code: 22149 /22460
- ^{1} French Land Register data, which excludes lakes, ponds, glaciers > 1 km^{2} (0.386 sq mi or 247 acres) and river estuaries.

Merléac (French pronunciation: [mɛʁleak]; Breton: Merleag) is a commune in the Côtes-d'Armor department of Brittany in northwestern France.

== Population ==
Historical population
Year	Pop.	±% p.a.
1968	885	—
1975	763	−2.10%
1982	639	−2.50%
1990	506	−2.87%
1999	509	+0.07%
2007	509	+0.00%
2012	479	−1.21%
2017	434	−1.95%
2023	481	+1.73%
Source: INSEE

Inhabitants of Merléac are called merléaciens in French.

== Sights ==
The Saint-Jacques chapel in the hamlet of Saint-Léon, which is located on the territory of the commune of Merléac, was declared a historic site on December 1, 1908.

== See also ==
- Communes of the Côtes-d'Armor department
