= Gausson =

Gausson Gwalc'hion
- Commune
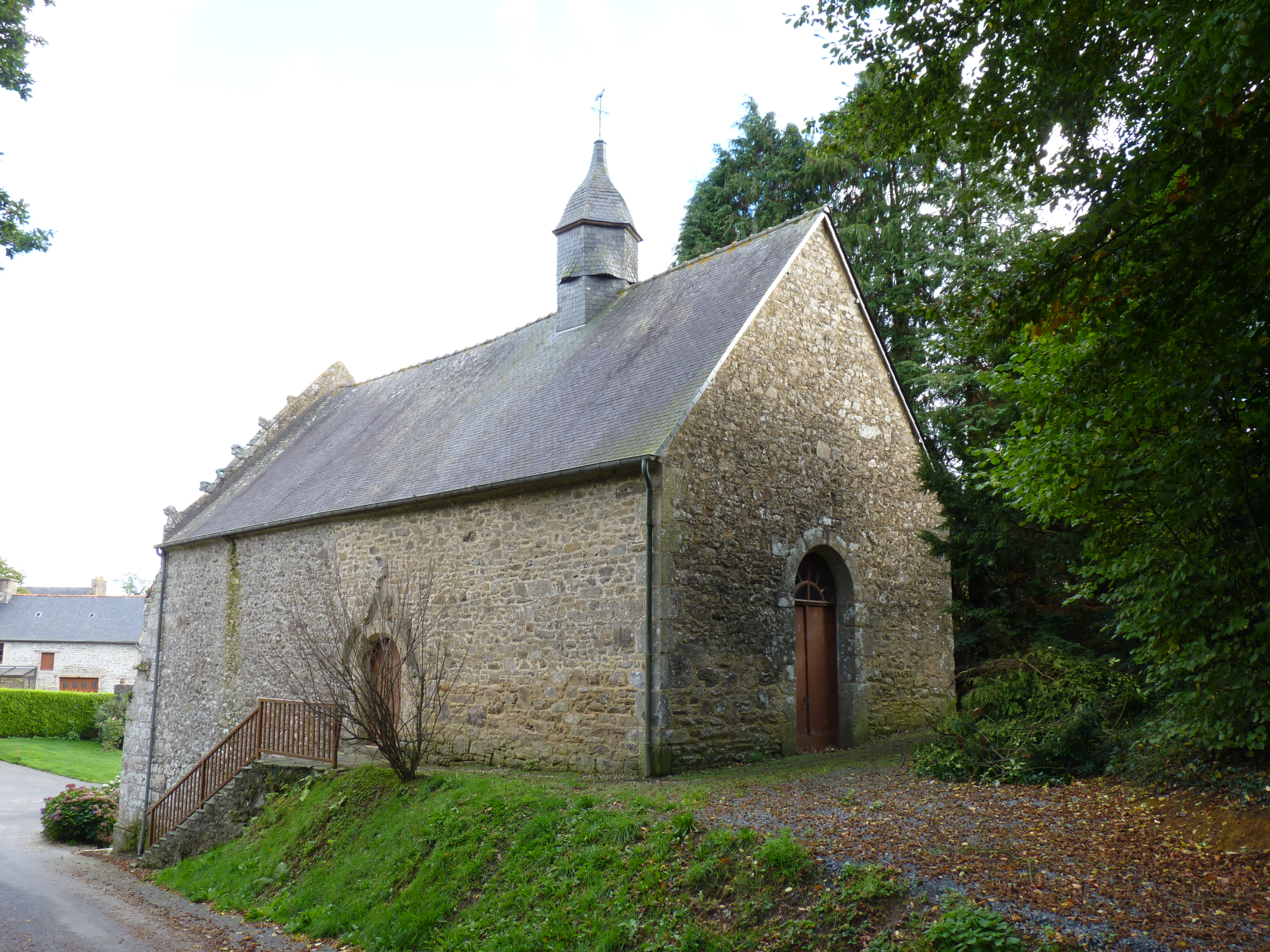
- The chapel of Saint-Nicolas in Gausson
- Location of Gausson
- Location within France Location within Brittany
- Coordinates: 48°18′00″N 2°45′12″W
- Country: France
- Region: Brittany
- Department: Côtes-d'Armor
- Arrondissement: Saint-Brieuc
- Canton: Guerlédan
- Intercommunality: Loudéac Communauté - Bretagne Centre

Government
  - Mayor (2020–2026): Arlette Michel
- Area^{1}: 16.71 km^{2} (6.45 sq mi)
- Highest elevation: 254 m (833 ft)
- Lowest elevation: 133 m (436 ft)
- Population (2023): 648
  - Density: 38.8/km^{2} (100/sq mi)
- Time zone: UTC+01:00 (CET)
  - Summer (DST): UTC+02:00 (CEST)
- INSEE/Postal code: 22060 /22150
- ^{1} French Land Register data, which excludes lakes, ponds, glaciers > 1 km^{2} (0.386 sq mi or 247 acres) and river estuaries.

Gausson (French pronunciation: [ɡosɔ̃]; Breton: Gwalc'hion; Gallo: Gauczon) is a commune in the Côtes-d'Armor department of Brittany in northwestern France.

== Population ==
Historical population
Year	Pop.	±% p.a.
1968	806	—
1975	691	−2.18%
1982	662	−0.61%
1990	603	−1.16%
1999	580	−0.43%
2007	581	+0.02%
2012	652	+2.33%
2017	616	−1.13%
2023	648	+0.85%
Source: INSEE

Inhabitants of Gausson are called gaussonnais in French.

== See also ==
- Communes of the Côtes-d'Armor department
