= Trévé =

Trévé Treve
- Commune
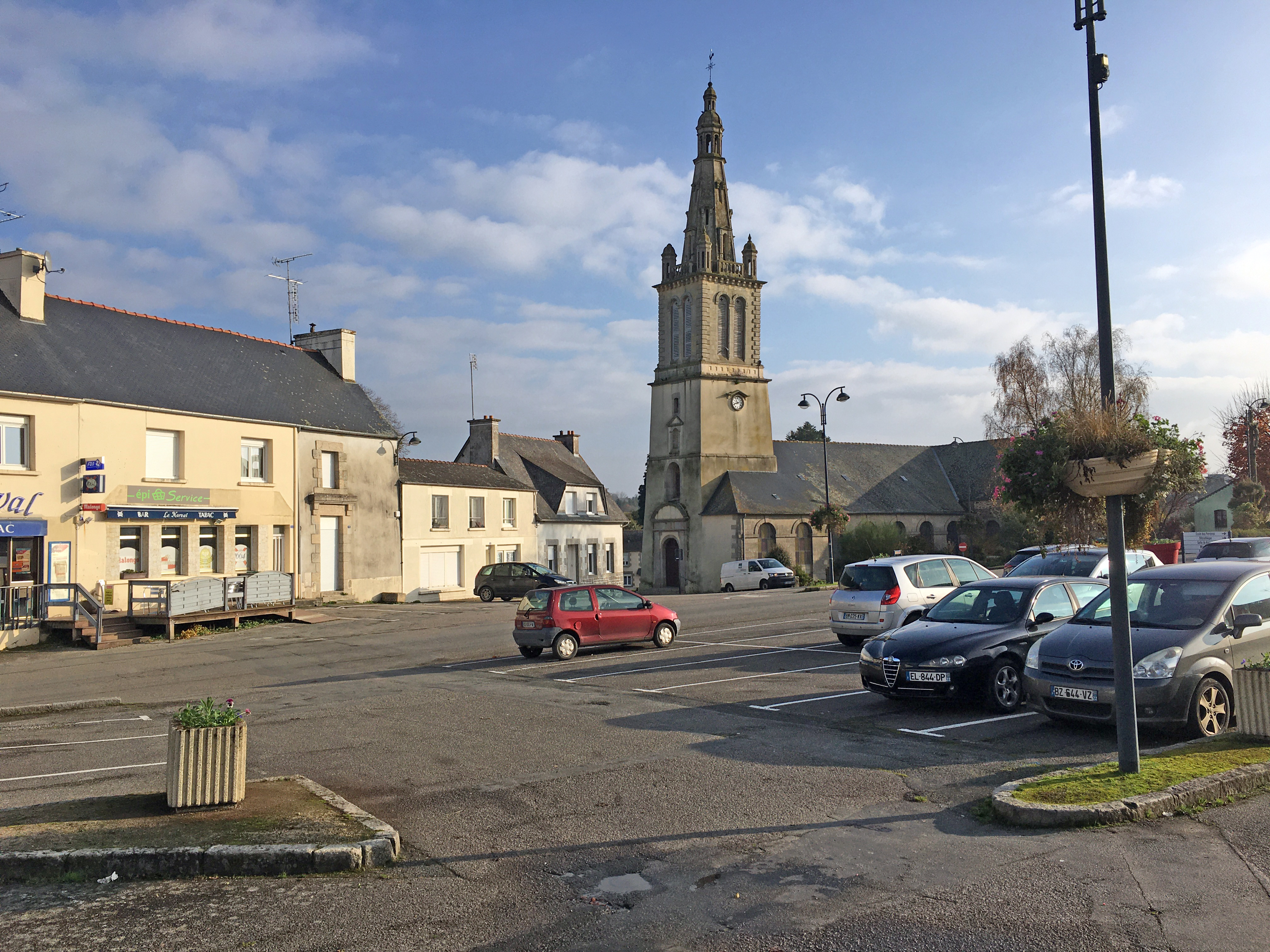
- The church of Saint-Just, in Trévé
- Location of Trévé
- Location within France Location within Brittany
- Coordinates: 48°12′50″N 2°47′39″W
- Country: France
- Region: Brittany
- Department: Côtes-d'Armor
- Arrondissement: Saint-Brieuc
- Canton: Guerlédan
- Intercommunality: Loudéac Communauté - Bretagne Centre

Government
  - Mayor (2020–2026): Gildas Adelis
- Area^{1}: 26.63 km^{2} (10.28 sq mi)
- Highest elevation: 256 m (840 ft)
- Lowest elevation: 87 m (285 ft)
- Population (2023): 1,681
  - Density: 63.12/km^{2} (163.5/sq mi)
- Time zone: UTC+01:00 (CET)
  - Summer (DST): UTC+02:00 (CEST)
- INSEE/Postal code: 22376 /22600
- ^{1} French Land Register data, which excludes lakes, ponds, glaciers > 1 km^{2} (0.386 sq mi or 247 acres) and river estuaries.

Trévé (French pronunciation: [tʁeve]; Breton: Treve) is a commune in the Côtes-d'Armor department of Brittany in northwestern France.

== Population ==
Historical population
Year	Pop.	±% p.a.
1968	1,217	—
1975	1,115	−1.24%
1982	1,276	+1.95%
1990	1,345	+0.66%
1999	1,312	−0.28%
2007	1,474	+1.47%
2012	1,617	+1.87%
2017	1,657	+0.49%
2023	1,681	+0.24%
Source: INSEE

Inhabitants of Trévé are called trévéens in French.

== See also ==
- Communes of the Côtes-d'Armor department
- Treve castle
