= Plouguenast-Langast =

- Commune
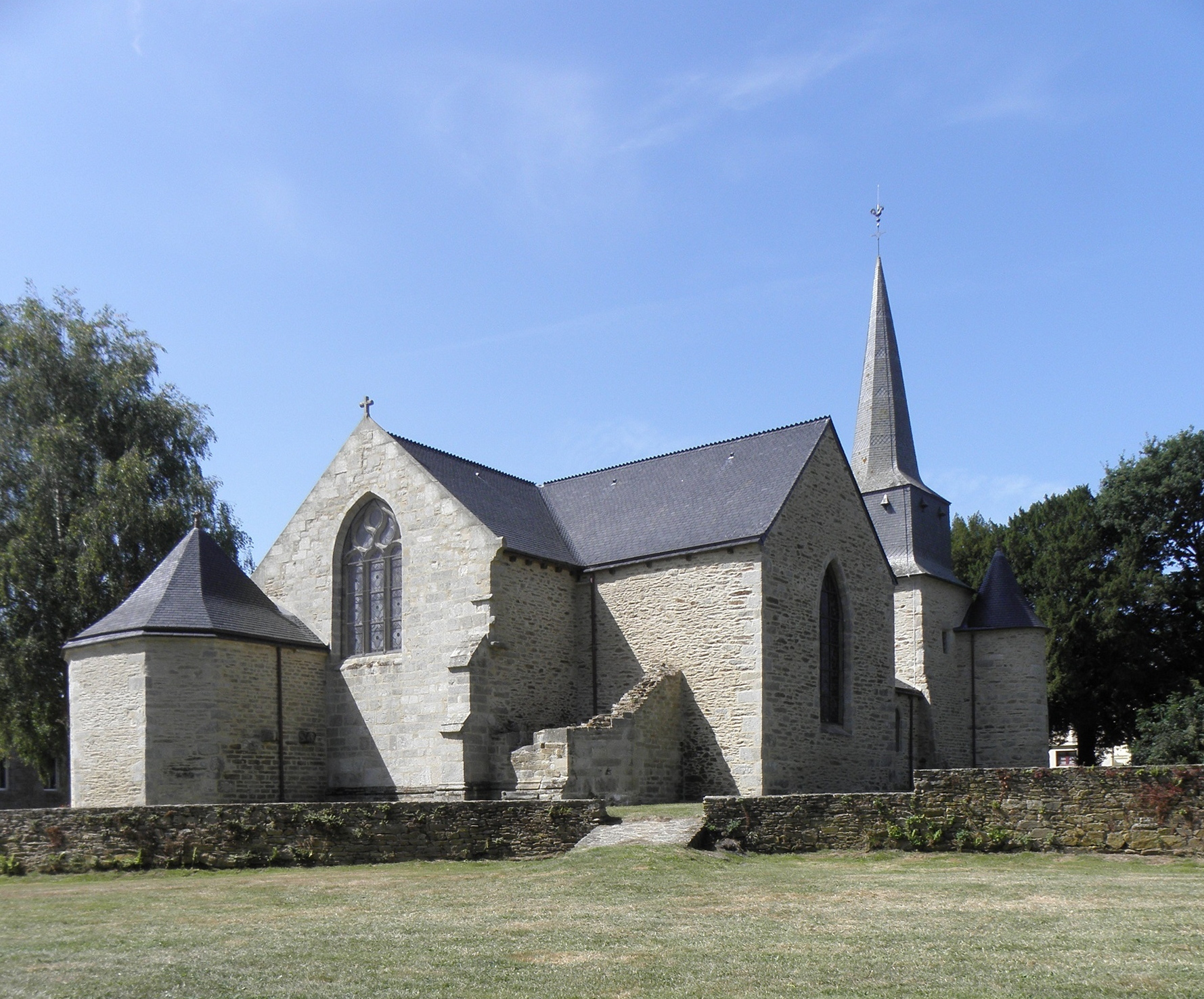
- The church of the old village, in Plouguenast
- Location of Plouguenast-Langast
- Location within France Location within Brittany
- Coordinates: 48°16′56″N 2°42′11″W
- Country: France
- Region: Brittany
- Department: Côtes-d'Armor
- Arrondissement: Saint-Brieuc
- Canton: Guerlédan
- Intercommunality: Loudéac Communauté - Bretagne Centre

Government
  - Mayor (2021–2026): Yvon Le Jan
- Area^{1}: 55.57 km^{2} (21.46 sq mi)
- Highest elevation: 253 m (830 ft)
- Lowest elevation: 104 m (341 ft)
- Population (2023): 2,380
  - Density: 42.8/km^{2} (111/sq mi)
- Time zone: UTC+01:00 (CET)
  - Summer (DST): UTC+02:00 (CEST)
- INSEE/Postal code: 22219 /22150
- ^{1} French Land Register data, which excludes lakes, ponds, glaciers > 1 km^{2} (0.386 sq mi or 247 acres) and river estuaries.

Plouguenast-Langast (French pronunciation: [pluɡna lɑ̃ɡa]; Breton: Plougonwaz-Lanwal) is a commune in the Côtes-d'Armor department of Brittany in northwestern France. It was established on 1 January 2019 by merger of the former communes of Plouguenast (the seat) and Langast.

== Geography ==
=== Climate ===
Plouguenast-Langast has an oceanic climate (Köppen climate classification Cfb). The average annual temperature in Plouguenast-Langast is 11.0 °C (51.8 °F). The average annual rainfall is 966.8 mm (38.06 in) with January as the wettest month. The temperatures are highest on average in August, at around 17.5 °C (63.5 °F), and lowest in January, at around 5.3 °C (41.5 °F). The highest temperature ever recorded in Plouguenast-Langast was 36.9 °C (98.4 °F) on 9 August 2003; the coldest temperature ever recorded was −12.4 °C (9.7 °F) on 2 January 1997.

Climate data for Plouguenast-Langast (1981–2010 averages, extremes 1987−present)
Month	Jan	Feb	Mar	Apr	May	Jun	Jul	Aug	Sep	Oct	Nov	Dec	Year
Record high °C (°F)	17.4 (63.3)	20.7 (69.3)	22.9 (73.2)	26.3 (79.3)	29.5 (85.1)	32.9 (91.2)	35.6 (96.1)	36.9 (98.4)	30.2 (86.4)	27.5 (81.5)	19.8 (67.6)	15.6 (60.1)	36.9 (98.4)
Mean daily maximum °C (°F)	7.8 (46.0)	8.7 (47.7)	11.3 (52.3)	13.3 (55.9)	16.9 (62.4)	20.0 (68.0)	22.0 (71.6)	22.4 (72.3)	19.6 (67.3)	15.3 (59.5)	10.8 (51.4)	7.9 (46.2)	14.7 (58.5)
Daily mean °C (°F)	5.3 (41.5)	5.8 (42.4)	7.8 (46.0)	9.3 (48.7)	12.6 (54.7)	15.3 (59.5)	17.2 (63.0)	17.5 (63.5)	15.1 (59.2)	11.9 (53.4)	8.0 (46.4)	5.4 (41.7)	11.0 (51.8)
Mean daily minimum °C (°F)	2.8 (37.0)	2.9 (37.2)	4.2 (39.6)	5.2 (41.4)	8.2 (46.8)	10.6 (51.1)	12.4 (54.3)	12.5 (54.5)	10.6 (51.1)	8.5 (47.3)	5.2 (41.4)	3.0 (37.4)	7.2 (45.0)
Record low °C (°F)	−12.4 (9.7)	−11.1 (12.0)	−5.6 (21.9)	−2.9 (26.8)	0.0 (32.0)	4.0 (39.2)	6.8 (44.2)	6.1 (43.0)	3.5 (38.3)	−3.4 (25.9)	−5.0 (23.0)	−9.0 (15.8)	−12.4 (9.7)
Average precipitation mm (inches)	117.1 (4.61)	93.3 (3.67)	72.7 (2.86)	75.5 (2.97)	65.1 (2.56)	54.2 (2.13)	55.2 (2.17)	50.6 (1.99)	70.1 (2.76)	101.0 (3.98)	101.3 (3.99)	110.7 (4.36)	966.8 (38.06)
Average precipitation days (≥ 1.0 mm)	15.5	13.6	12.7	12.2	10.0	8.2	9.3	8.4	9.8	13.9	14.8	14.5	142.8
Source: Météo France

== Population ==
Population data refer to the commune in its geography as of January 2025.

Historical population
Year	Pop.	±% p.a.
1968	2,721	—
1975	2,560	−0.87%
1982	2,466	−0.53%
1990	2,434	−0.16%
1999	2,365	−0.32%
2007	2,427	+0.32%
2012	2,527	+0.81%
2017	2,487	−0.32%
2023	2,380	−0.73%
Source: INSEE

== See also ==
- Communes of the Côtes-d'Armor department
