= La Motte, Côtes-d'Armor =

La Motte Ar Voudenn
- Commune
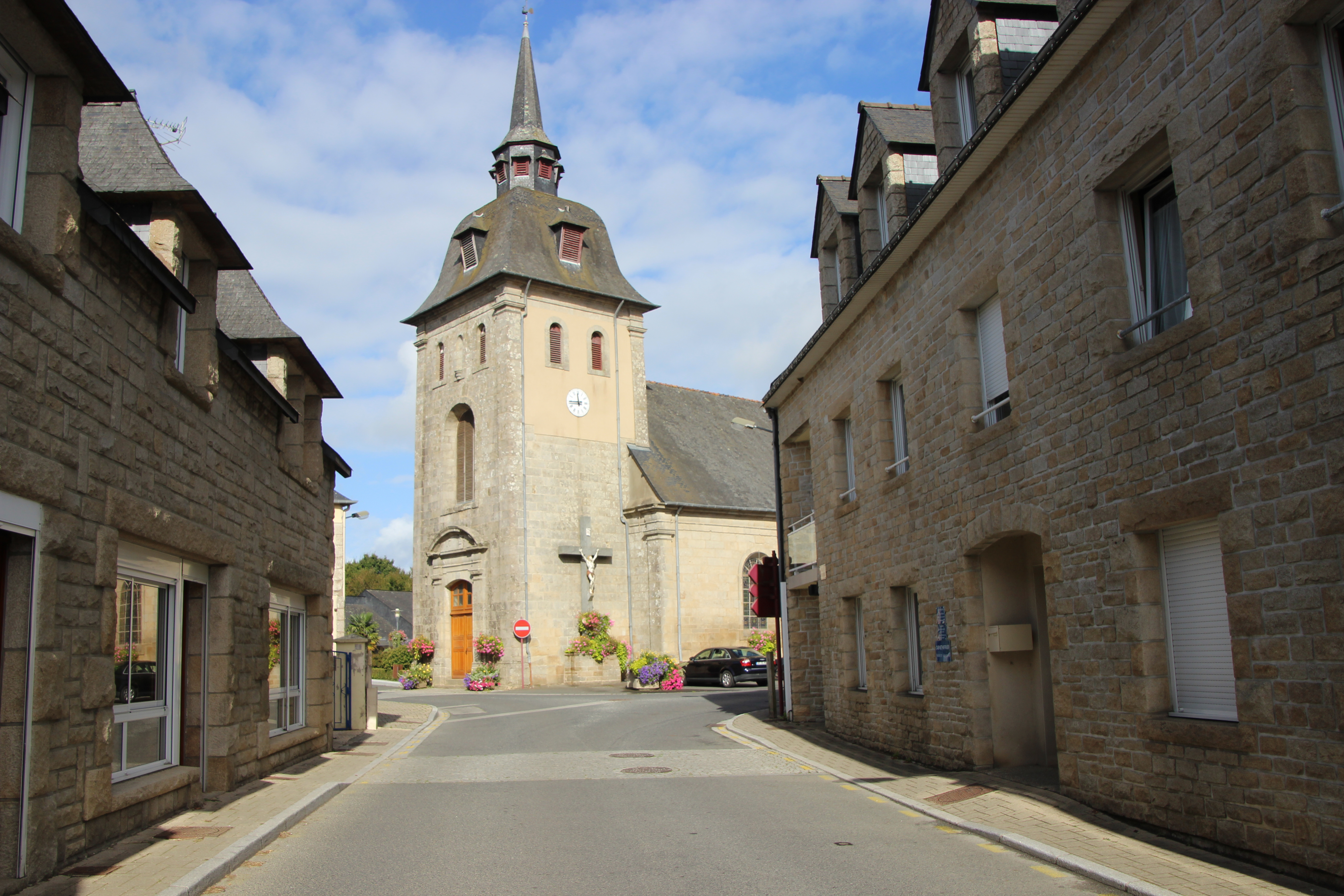
- The church of La Motte
- Location of La Motte
- Location within France Location within Brittany
- Coordinates: 48°14′09″N 2°43′52″W
- Country: France
- Region: Brittany
- Department: Côtes-d'Armor
- Arrondissement: Saint-Brieuc
- Canton: Guerlédan
- Intercommunality: Loudéac Communauté - Bretagne Centre

Government
  - Mayor (2020–2026): Henri Flageul
- Area^{1}: 43.03 km^{2} (16.61 sq mi)
- Highest elevation: 278 m (912 ft)
- Lowest elevation: 96 m (315 ft)
- Population (2023): 2,173
  - Density: 50.50/km^{2} (130.8/sq mi)
- Time zone: UTC+01:00 (CET)
  - Summer (DST): UTC+02:00 (CEST)
- INSEE/Postal code: 22155 /22600
- ^{1} French Land Register data, which excludes lakes, ponds, glaciers > 1 km^{2} (0.386 sq mi or 247 acres) and river estuaries.

La Motte (French pronunciation: [la mɔt]; Breton: ar Voudenn; Gallo: La Mott) is a commune in the Côtes-d'Armor department of Brittany in northwestern France.

== Population ==
Inhabitants of La Motte are called mottérieux in French.

Historical population
| Year | Pop. | ±% p.a. |
|---|---|---|
| 1968 | 1,473 | — |
| 1975 | 1,536 | +0.60% |
| 1982 | 1,834 | +2.57% |
| 1990 | 1,838 | +0.03% |
| 1999 | 1,773 | −0.40% |
| 2007 | 1,992 | +1.47% |
| 2012 | 2,088 | +0.95% |
| 2017 | 2,131 | +0.41% |
| 2023 | 2,173 | +0.33% |
Source: INSEE

== See also ==
- Communes of the Côtes-d'Armor department
