= Uzel =

Uzel Uzel
- Commune
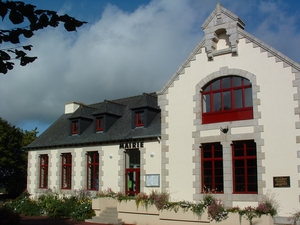
- The town hall of Uzel

- Coat of arms
- Location of Uzel
- Location within France Location within Brittany
- Coordinates: 48°17′N 2°50′W
- Country: France
- Region: Brittany
- Department: Côtes-d'Armor
- Arrondissement: Saint-Brieuc
- Canton: Guerlédan
- Intercommunality: Loudéac Communauté - Bretagne Centre

Government
  - Mayor (2020–2026): Guénaël Choupaux
- Area^{1}: 6.79 km^{2} (2.62 sq mi)
- Highest elevation: 238 m (781 ft)
- Lowest elevation: 116 m (381 ft)
- Population (2023): 1,134
  - Density: 167/km^{2} (433/sq mi)
- Time zone: UTC+01:00 (CET)
  - Summer (DST): UTC+02:00 (CEST)
- INSEE/Postal code: 22384 /22460
- ^{1} French Land Register data, which excludes lakes, ponds, glaciers > 1 km^{2} (0.386 sq mi or 247 acres) and river estuaries.

Uzel (French pronunciation: [yzɛl]; or Uzel-près-l'Oust) is a commune in the Côtes-d'Armor department in Brittany in northwestern France. It is about 100 km (62 mi) west-northwest of Rennes and 15 km (9.3 mi) north-northwest of Loudéac.

The old school, in the centre of Uzel, was the scene of torture and killings by the Nazis and by the collaborationist Bezen Perrot, in 1944.

== Population ==
Historical population
Year	Pop.	±% p.a.
1968	899	—
1975	926	+0.42%
1982	990	+0.96%
1990	943	−0.61%
1999	897	−0.55%
2007	1,028	+1.72%
2012	1,113	+1.60%
2017	1,046	−1.23%
2023	1,134	+1.36%
Source: INSEE

The inhabitants of Uzel are known in French as uzelais.

== Personalities ==
- Fulgence Bienvenüe, chief engineer for the Paris Métro in 1896, was born in Uzel in 1852.
- Alphonse Guépin, architect, born in Uzel in 1808.
- Yves Morvan, romanesque art specialist, born in Uzel in 1932.

== See also ==
- Communes of the Côtes-d'Armor department
