= Corlay =

Corlay Korle (Breton)
- Commune
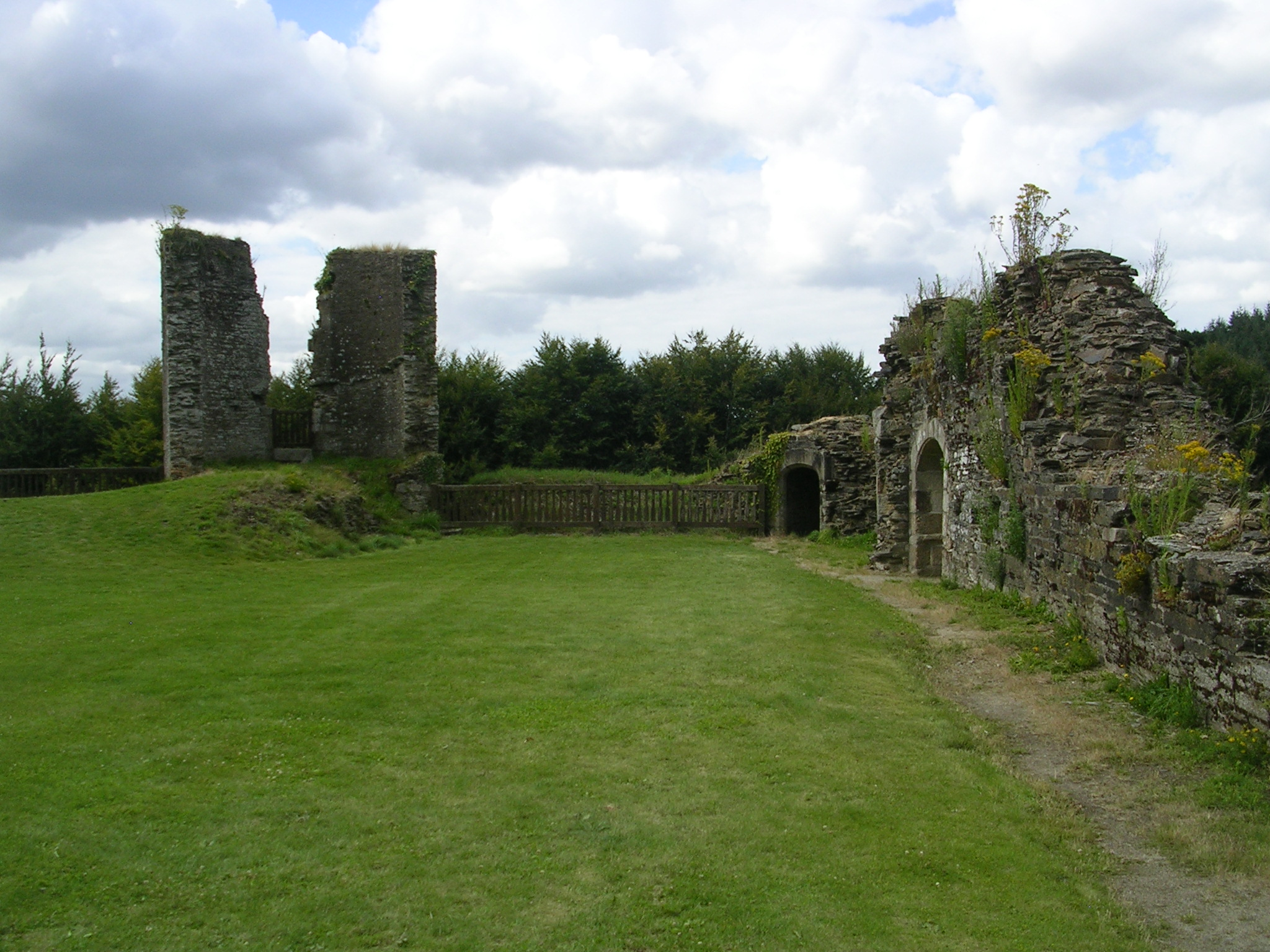
- Ruins of the chateau

- Coat of arms
- Location of Corlay
- Location within France Location within Brittany
- Coordinates: 48°19′05″N 3°03′20″W
- Country: France
- Region: Brittany
- Department: Côtes-d'Armor
- Arrondissement: Saint-Brieuc
- Canton: Guerlédan
- Intercommunality: Loudéac Communauté - Bretagne Centre

Government
  - Mayor (2020–2026): Olivier Allain
- Area^{1}: 13.80 km^{2} (5.33 sq mi)
- Highest elevation: 257 m (843 ft)
- Lowest elevation: 157 m (515 ft)
- Population (2023): 914
  - Density: 66.2/km^{2} (172/sq mi)
- Time zone: UTC+01:00 (CET)
  - Summer (DST): UTC+02:00 (CEST)
- INSEE/Postal code: 22047 /22320
- ^{1} French Land Register data, which excludes lakes, ponds, glaciers > 1 km^{2} (0.386 sq mi or 247 acres) and river estuaries.

Corlay (French pronunciation: [kɔʁlɛ]; Breton: Korle) is a commune in the Côtes-d'Armor department of Brittany in northwestern France.

== Population ==
Historical population
| Year | Pop. | ±% p.a. |
|---|---|---|
| 1968 | 1,088 | — |
| 1975 | 1,133 | +0.58% |
| 1982 | 1,071 | −0.80% |
| 1990 | 1,044 | −0.32% |
| 1999 | 978 | −0.72% |
| 2007 | 1,064 | +1.06% |
| 2012 | 994 | −1.35% |
| 2017 | 957 | −0.76% |
| 2023 | 914 | −0.76% |
Source: INSEE

Inhabitants of Corlay are called corlaisiens in French.

== See also ==
- Communes of the Côtes-d'Armor department
