= Caurel, Côtes-d'Armor =

Caurel Kaorel
- Commune
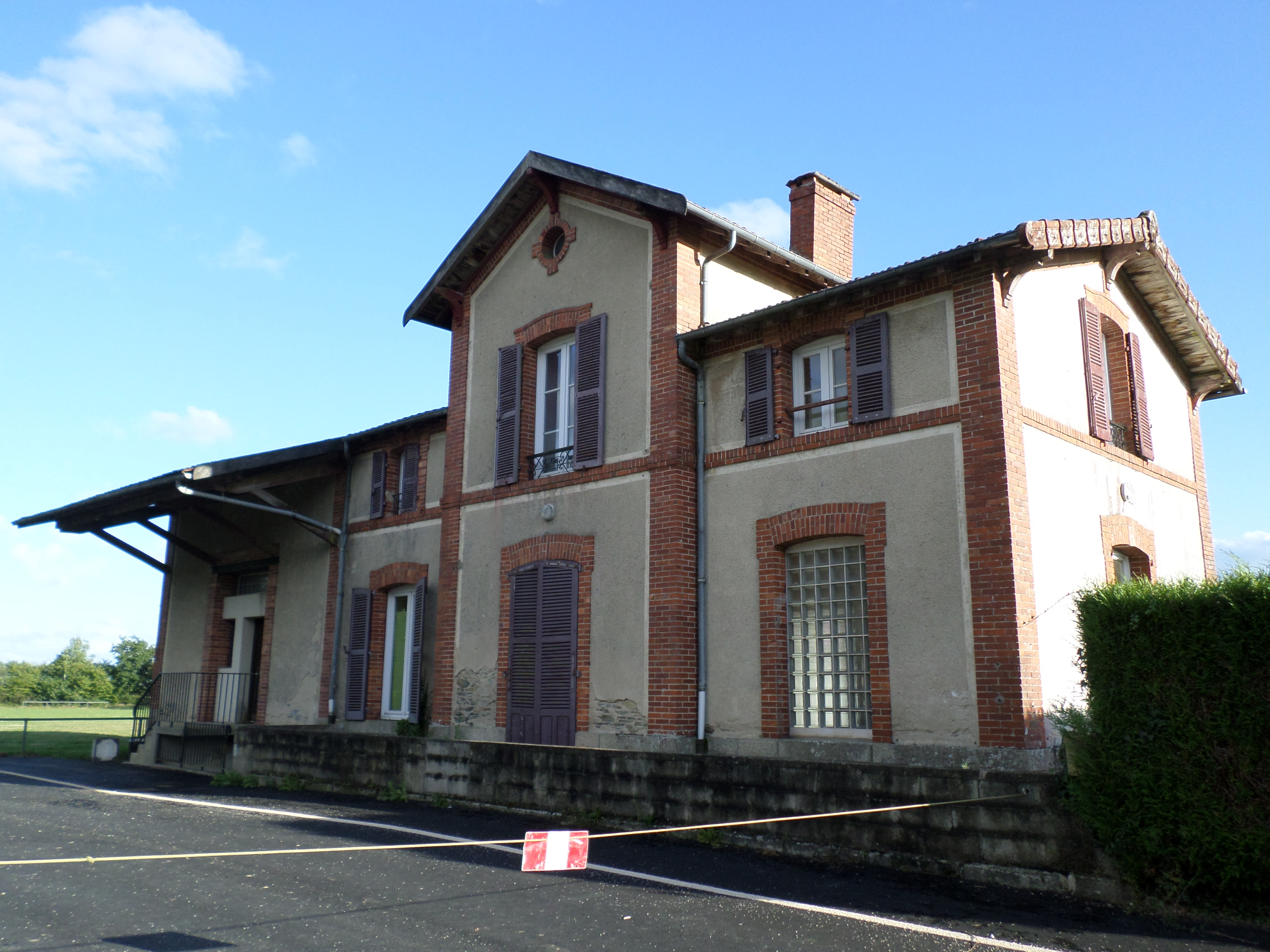
- The old train station in Caurel
- Location of Caurel
- Location within France Location within Brittany
- Coordinates: 48°13′01″N 3°02′14″W
- Country: France
- Region: Brittany
- Department: Côtes-d'Armor
- Arrondissement: Saint-Brieuc
- Canton: Guerlédan
- Intercommunality: Loudéac Communauté - Bretagne Centre

Government
  - Mayor (2020–2026): Jean-Louis Martigné
- Area^{1}: 11.65 km^{2} (4.50 sq mi)
- Highest elevation: 308 m (1,010 ft)
- Lowest elevation: 120 m (390 ft)
- Population (2023): 353
  - Density: 30.3/km^{2} (78.5/sq mi)
- Time zone: UTC+01:00 (CET)
  - Summer (DST): UTC+02:00 (CEST)
- INSEE/Postal code: 22033 /22530
- ^{1} French Land Register data, which excludes lakes, ponds, glaciers > 1 km^{2} (0.386 sq mi or 247 acres) and river estuaries.

Caurel (French pronunciation: [koʁɛl]; Breton: Kaorel) is a commune in the Côtes-d'Armor department of Brittany in northwestern France.

== Geography ==
The village is located on the north shore of the Lake Guerlédan.

=== Climate ===
Caurel has an oceanic climate (Köppen climate classification Cfb). The average annual temperature in Caurel is 12.0 °C (53.6 °F). The average annual rainfall is 1,112.2 mm (43.79 in) with November as the wettest month. The temperatures are highest on average in July, at around 18.3 °C (64.9 °F), and lowest in December, at around 6.1 °C (43.0 °F). The highest temperature ever recorded in Caurel was 39.0 °C (102.2 °F) on 9 August 2003; the coldest temperature ever recorded was −8.1 °C (17.4 °F) on 11 February 2012.

Climate data for Caurel (1981–2010 averages, extremes 1999−present)
| Month | Jan | Feb | Mar | Apr | May | Jun | Jul | Aug | Sep | Oct | Nov | Dec | Year |
|---|---|---|---|---|---|---|---|---|---|---|---|---|---|
| Record high °C (°F) | 16.6 (61.9) | 20.5 (68.9) | 22.8 (73.0) | 26.5 (79.7) | 30.0 (86.0) | 34.5 (94.1) | 35.2 (95.4) | 39.0 (102.2) | 30.6 (87.1) | 28.4 (83.1) | 19.4 (66.9) | 16.0 (60.8) | 39.0 (102.2) |
| Mean daily maximum °C (°F) | 9.0 (48.2) | 10.0 (50.0) | 12.5 (54.5) | 15.1 (59.2) | 18.1 (64.6) | 22.1 (71.8) | 23.1 (73.6) | 23.0 (73.4) | 21.0 (69.8) | 16.6 (61.9) | 12.4 (54.3) | 9.1 (48.4) | 16.0 (60.8) |
| Daily mean °C (°F) | 6.2 (43.2) | 6.7 (44.1) | 8.5 (47.3) | 10.4 (50.7) | 13.6 (56.5) | 16.9 (62.4) | 18.3 (64.9) | 18.2 (64.8) | 16.1 (61.0) | 12.9 (55.2) | 9.2 (48.6) | 6.1 (43.0) | 12.0 (53.6) |
| Mean daily minimum °C (°F) | 3.3 (37.9) | 3.4 (38.1) | 4.5 (40.1) | 5.7 (42.3) | 9.0 (48.2) | 11.7 (53.1) | 13.4 (56.1) | 13.4 (56.1) | 11.3 (52.3) | 9.2 (48.6) | 6.0 (42.8) | 3.2 (37.8) | 7.9 (46.2) |
| Record low °C (°F) | −7.7 (18.1) | −8.1 (17.4) | −6.3 (20.7) | −2.1 (28.2) | −0.8 (30.6) | 3.9 (39.0) | 5.3 (41.5) | 6.0 (42.8) | 3.7 (38.7) | −0.7 (30.7) | −4.2 (24.4) | −6.1 (21.0) | −8.1 (17.4) |
| Average precipitation mm (inches) | 129.7 (5.11) | 105.1 (4.14) | 97.7 (3.85) | 80.6 (3.17) | 73.0 (2.87) | 46.9 (1.85) | 65.9 (2.59) | 65.9 (2.59) | 58.6 (2.31) | 118.0 (4.65) | 136.8 (5.39) | 134.0 (5.28) | 1,112.2 (43.79) |
| Average precipitation days (≥ 1.0 mm) | 15.9 | 13.9 | 14.4 | 11.8 | 10.9 | 7.2 | 10.3 | 9.2 | 8.2 | 14.1 | 16.9 | 15.4 | 148.1 |
Source: Meteociel

== Map ==
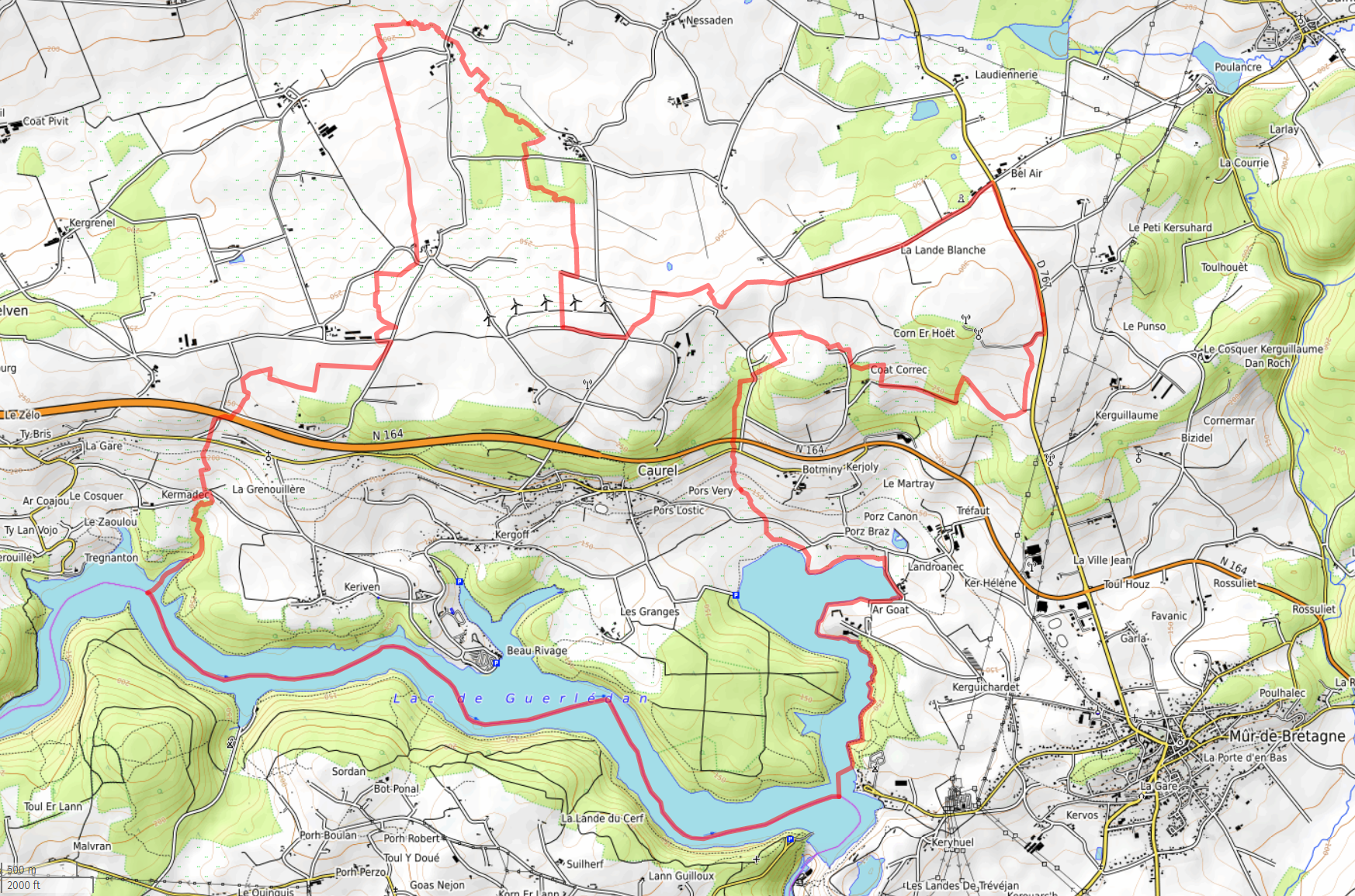
Topographic map.

== Population ==
Historical population
| Year | Pop. | ±% p.a. |
|---|---|---|
| 1968 | 434 | — |
| 1975 | 358 | −2.71% |
| 1982 | 376 | +0.70% |
| 1990 | 384 | +0.26% |
| 1999 | 387 | +0.09% |
| 2007 | 381 | −0.20% |
| 2012 | 381 | +0.00% |
| 2017 | 360 | −1.13% |
| 2023 | 353 | −0.33% |
Source: INSEE

Inhabitants of Caurel are called Caurelois in French and Kaoreliz in Breton.

== See also ==
- Communes of the Côtes-d'Armor department
