= Arrondissement of Saint-Brieuc =

Coordinates: 48°31′N 2°46′W

Saint-Brieuc
- Arrondissement
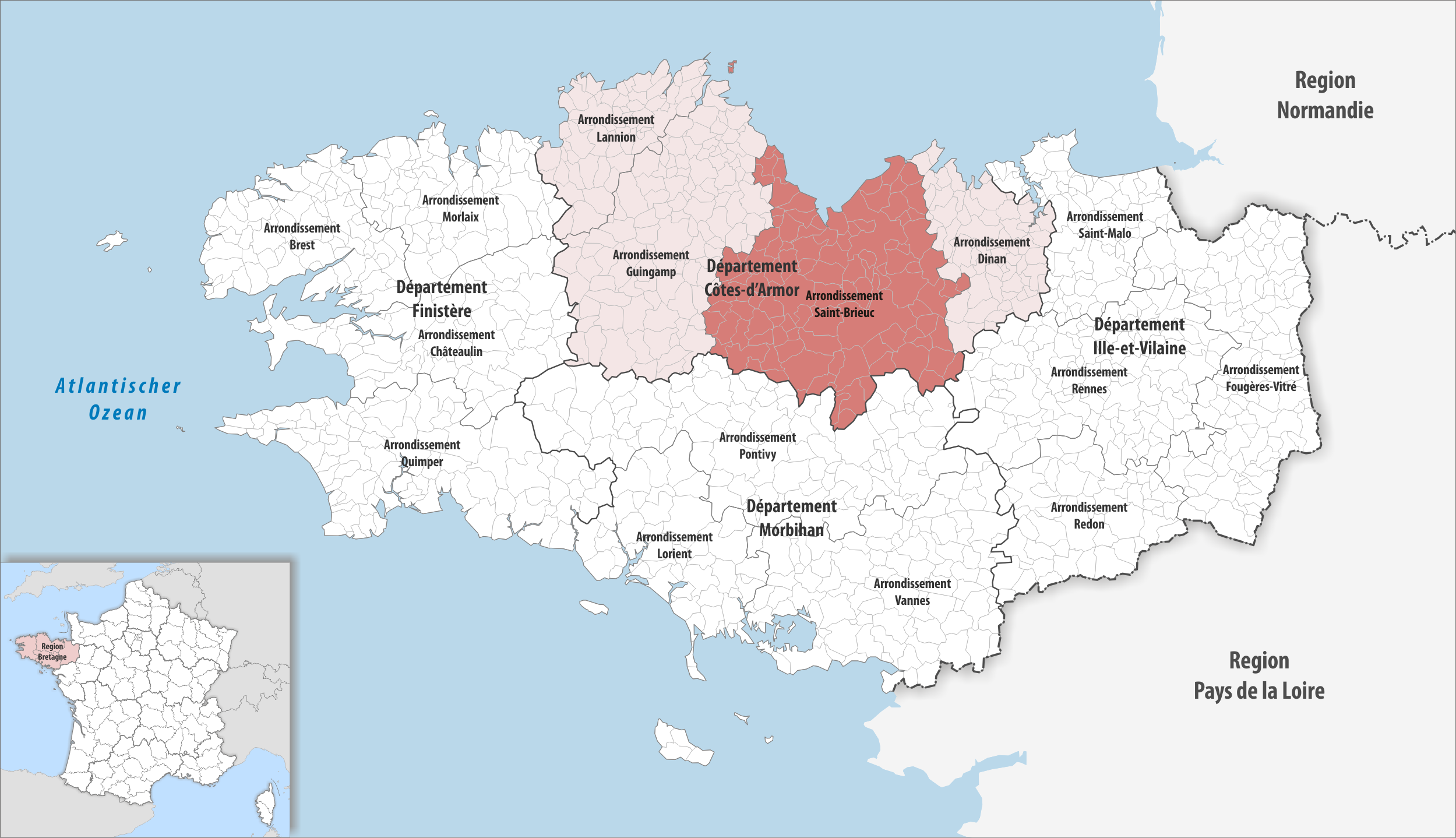
- Location within the region Brittany
- Country: France
- Region: Brittany
- Department: Côtes-d'Armor
- No. of communes: {{{nbcomm}}}
- Area: 2,696.0 km^{2} (1,040.9 sq mi)
- Population (2023): 276,769
  - Density: 102.66/km^{2} (265.89/sq mi)
- INSEE code: 224

The arrondissement of Saint-Brieuc is an arrondissement of France in the Côtes-d'Armor department in the Brittany region. It has 113 communes. Its population is 274,111 (2021), and its area is 2,696.0 km^{2} (1,040.9 sq mi).

== Composition ==
The communes of the arrondissement of Saint-Brieuc, and their INSEE codes, are:

1. Allineuc (22001)
2. Andel (22002)
3. Binic-Étables-sur-Mer (22055)
4. Le Bodéo (22009)
5. La Bouillie (22012)
6. Bréhand (22015)
7. Le Cambout (22027)
8. Caurel (22033)
9. La Chèze (22039)
10. Coëtlogon (22043)
11. Coëtmieux (22044)
12. Corlay (22047)
13. Éréac (22053)
14. Erquy (22054)
15. Le Fœil (22059)
16. Gausson (22060)
17. Gomené (22062)
18. Grâce-Uzel (22068)
19. Guerlédan (22158)
20. La Harmoye (22073)
21. Le Haut-Corlay (22074)
22. Hémonstoir (22075)
23. Hénanbihen (22076)
24. Hénansal (22077)
25. Hénon (22079)
26. Hillion (22081)
27. Île-de-Bréhat (22016)
28. Illifaut (22083)
29. Jugon-les-Lacs-Commune-Nouvelle (22084)
30. Lamballe-Armor (22093)
31. Landéhen (22098)
32. Lanfains (22099)
33. Langueux (22106)
34. Lanrelas (22114)
35. Lantic (22117)
36. Laurenan (22122)
37. Le Leslay (22126)
38. Loscouët-sur-Meu (22133)
39. Loudéac (22136)
40. La Malhoure (22140)
41. La Méaugon (22144)
42. Le Mené (22046)
43. Merdrignac (22147)
44. Mérillac (22148)
45. Merléac (22149)
46. Moncontour (22153)
47. La Motte (22155)
48. Noyal (22160)
49. Penguily (22165)
50. Plaine-Haute (22170)
51. Plaintel (22171)
52. Plédéliac (22175)
53. Plédran (22176)
54. Plémet (22183)
55. Plémy (22184)
56. Plénée-Jugon (22185)
57. Pléneuf-Val-André (22186)
58. Plérin (22187)
59. Plestan (22193)
60. Plœuc-l'Hermitage (22203)
61. Ploufragan (22215)
62. Plouguenast-Langast (22219)
63. Plourhan (22232)
64. Plumieux (22241)
65. Plurien (22242)
66. Plussulien (22244)
67. Pommeret (22246)
68. Pordic (22251)
69. La Prénessaye (22255)
70. Quessoy (22258)
71. Le Quillio (22260)
72. Quintenic (22261)
73. Quintin (22262)
74. Rouillac (22267)
75. Saint-Alban (22273)
76. Saint-Barnabé (22275)
77. Saint-Bihy (22276)
78. Saint-Brandan (22277)
79. Saint-Brieuc (22278)
80. Saint-Caradec (22279)
81. Saint-Carreuc (22281)
82. Saint-Connec (22285)
83. Saint-Denoual (22286)
84. Saint-Donan (22287)
85. Saint-Étienne-du-Gué-de-l'Isle (22288)
86. Saint-Gildas (22291)
87. Saint-Gilles-Vieux-Marché (22295)
88. Saint-Glen (22296)
89. Saint-Hervé (22300)
90. Saint-Julien (22307)
91. Saint-Launeuc (22309)
92. Saint-Martin-des-Prés (22313)
93. Saint-Maudan (22314)
94. Saint-Mayeux (22316)
95. Saint-Quay-Portrieux (22325)
96. Saint-Rieul (22326)
97. Saint-Thélo (22330)
98. Saint-Trimoël (22332)
99. Saint-Vran (22333)
100. Sévignac (22337)
101. Tramain (22341)
102. Trébry (22345)
103. Trédaniel (22346)
104. Trédias (22348)
105. Trégueux (22360)
106. Trémeur (22369)
107. Trémorel (22371)
108. Trémuson (22372)
109. Trévé (22376)
110. Tréveneuc (22377)
111. Uzel (22384)
112. Le Vieux-Bourg (22386)
113. Yffiniac (22389)

== History ==
The arrondissement Saint-Brieuc of was created in 1800. At the January 2017 reorganisation of the arrondissements of Côtes-d'Armor, it gained 25 communes from the arrondissement of Dinan and five communes from the arrondissement of Guingamp, and it lost 29 communes to the arrondissement of Guingamp.

As a result of the reorganisation of the cantons of France which came into effect in 2015, the borders of the cantons are no longer related to the borders of the arrondissements. The cantons of the arrondissement of Saint-Brieuc were, as of January 2015:

1. Châtelaudren
2. La Chèze
3. Corlay
4. Étables-sur-Mer
5. Lamballe
6. Langueux
7. Lanvollon
8. Loudéac
9. Moncontour
10. Paimpol
11. Pléneuf-Val-André
12. Plérin
13. Ploeuc-sur-Lié
14. Ploufragan
15. Plouguenast
16. Plouha
17. Quintin
18. Saint-Brieuc-Nord
19. Saint-Brieuc-Ouest
20. Saint-Brieuc-Sud
21. Uzel
