= Canton of Guerlédan =

Coordinates: 48.20°N 2.99°W

The canton of Guerlédan (before 2021: Mûr-de-Bretagne) is an administrative division of the Côtes-d'Armor department, northwestern France. Its borders were modified at the French canton reorganisation which came into effect in March 2015. Its seat is in Guerlédan.

It consists of the following communes:

- Allineuc
- Caurel
- Corlay
- Gausson
- Grâce-Uzel
- Guerlédan
- Le Haut-Corlay
- Hémonstoir
- Merléac
- La Motte
- Plouguenast-Langast
- Plussulien
- Le Quillio
- Saint-Caradec
- Saint-Connec
- Saint-Gilles-Vieux-Marché
- Saint-Hervé
- Saint-Martin-des-Prés
- Saint-Mayeux
- Saint-Thélo
- Trévé
- Uzel
