= Saint-Pôtan =

Saint-Pôtan Sant-Postan
- Commune
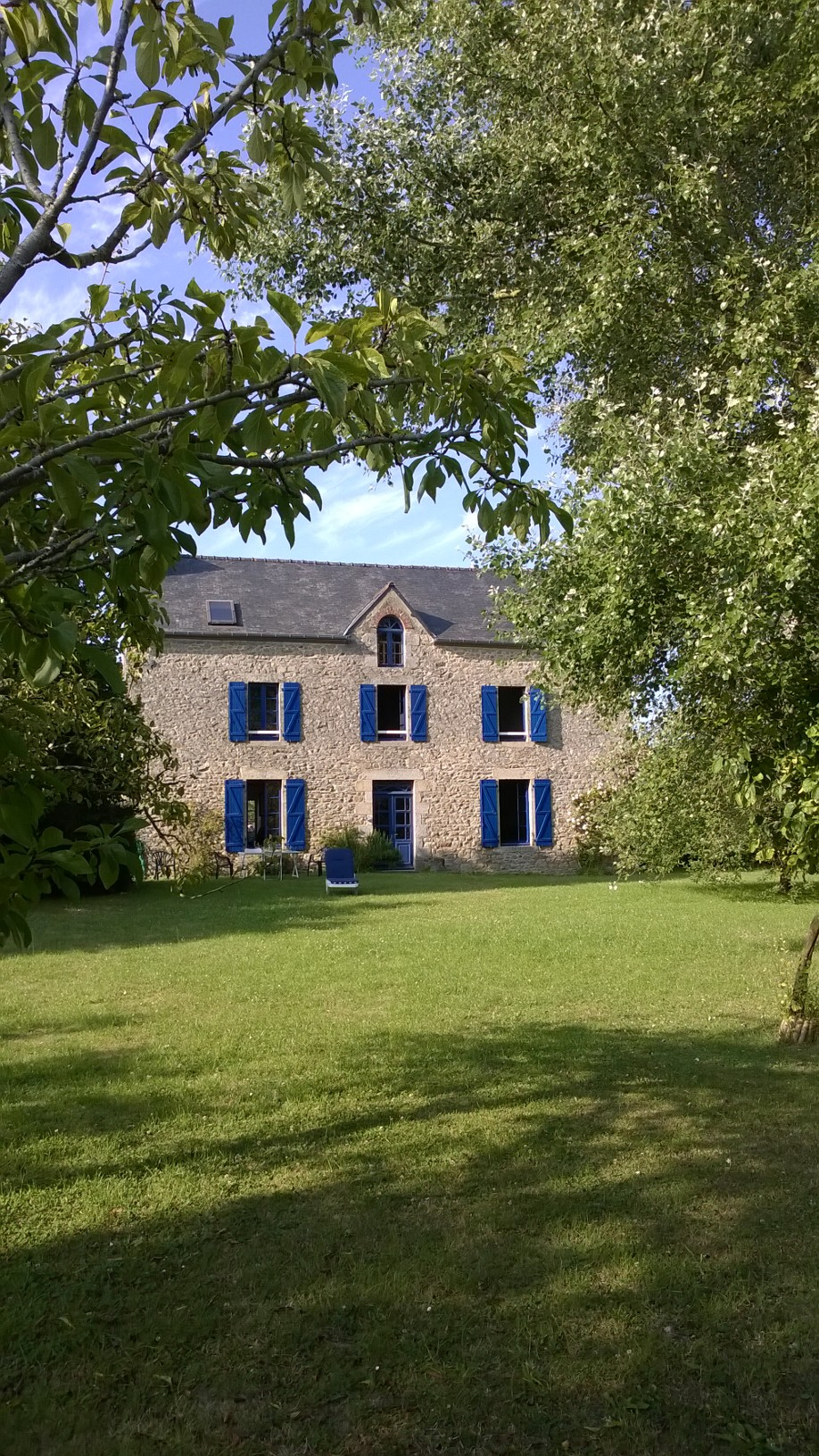
- Manor House in Saint Pôtan, Brittany

- Coat of arms
- Location of Saint-Pôtan
- Location within France Location within Brittany
- Coordinates: 48°33′30″N 2°17′24″W
- Country: France
- Region: Brittany
- Department: Côtes-d'Armor
- Arrondissement: Dinan
- Canton: Pléneuf-Val-André
- Intercommunality: Dinan Agglomération

Government
  - Mayor (2020–2026): Arnaud Lecuyer
- Area^{1}: 19.89 km^{2} (7.68 sq mi)
- Highest elevation: 77 m (253 ft)
- Lowest elevation: 12 m (39 ft)
- Population (2023): 839
  - Density: 42.2/km^{2} (109/sq mi)
- Time zone: UTC+01:00 (CET)
  - Summer (DST): UTC+02:00 (CEST)
- INSEE/Postal code: 22323 /22550
- ^{1} French Land Register data, which excludes lakes, ponds, glaciers > 1 km^{2} (0.386 sq mi or 247 acres) and river estuaries.

Saint-Pôtan (French pronunciation: [sɛ̃ potɑ̃]; Breton: Sant-Postan) is a commune in the Côtes-d'Armor department of Brittany in northwestern France.

It takes its name from Saint Pôtan, the namesake of the commune's church. It has grown steadily since 2011 owing to new housing estates and contains a small variety of shops. It is surrounded by more than a dozen stone crosses.

In the village of Saint-Pôtan is a manor house now called «Le Vaumeloisel», which used to be a chateau before being destroyed in the French Revolution. This chateau once welcomed the Duchess Anne of Brittany, who married two French kings, and is now a family house. The family who once lived in this house were the Guyon family, who are French aristocrats who own many manor houses in the department of Côtes-d'Armor. One of these includes the well known Fort-la-Latte chateau, where the movie The Vikings was filmed.

Much local employment comes from agriculture and tourism, but it is also the home of Sodimac, the major employer of the commune, a manufacturer of agricultural machinery and steel building components.

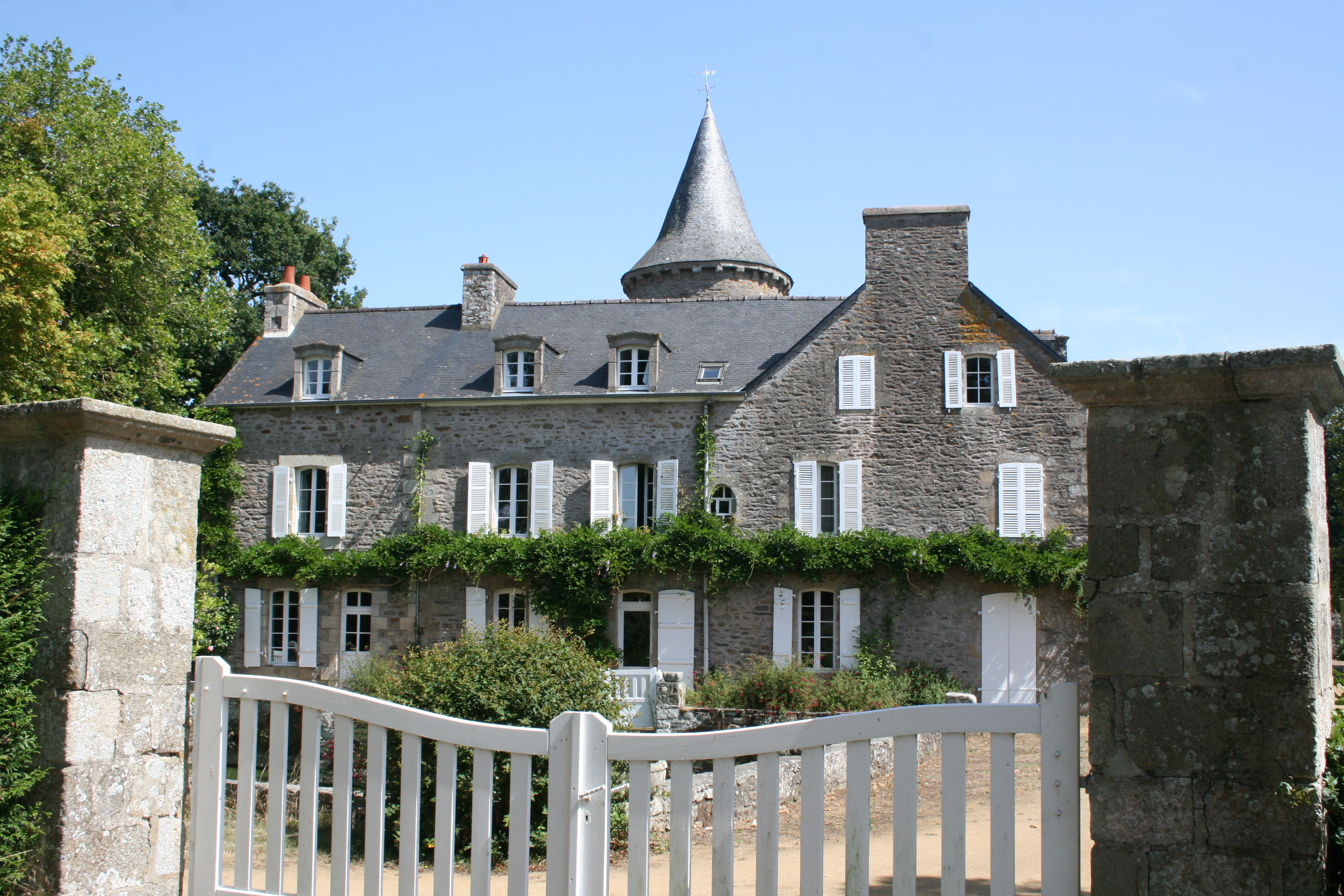
Manor house in Saint-Pôtan

== Population ==
Historical population
| Year | Pop. | ±% p.a. |
|---|---|---|
| 1968 | 926 | — |
| 1975 | 885 | −0.64% |
| 1982 | 860 | −0.41% |
| 1990 | 798 | −0.93% |
| 1999 | 735 | −0.91% |
| 2007 | 768 | +0.55% |
| 2012 | 803 | +0.90% |
| 2017 | 807 | +0.10% |
| 2023 | 839 | +0.65% |
Source: INSEE

== Geography ==
Saint-Pôtan is situated near the town of Matignon, and is only about 10 kilometres (6.2 mi) from the coast. Saint-Pôtan is also close to main transport links including the Saint-Malo ferry port, which has routes to England and the channel Islands, operated by Brittany Ferries and Condor Ferries. It is close to the towns of Lamballe, Dinan, Saint-Brieuc, Rennes, and Saint-Malo. There are train stations in Lamballe, Saint-Malo and Saint-Brieuc which have links to Brest and Gare Montparnasse (Paris). Saint-Pôtan is also ideally sitatuated for air travel as Dinard–Pleurtuit–Saint-Malo Airport is only about 15 km away with links to England and the Channel Islands. Further away are Brest and Rennes airports, with links to Europe.

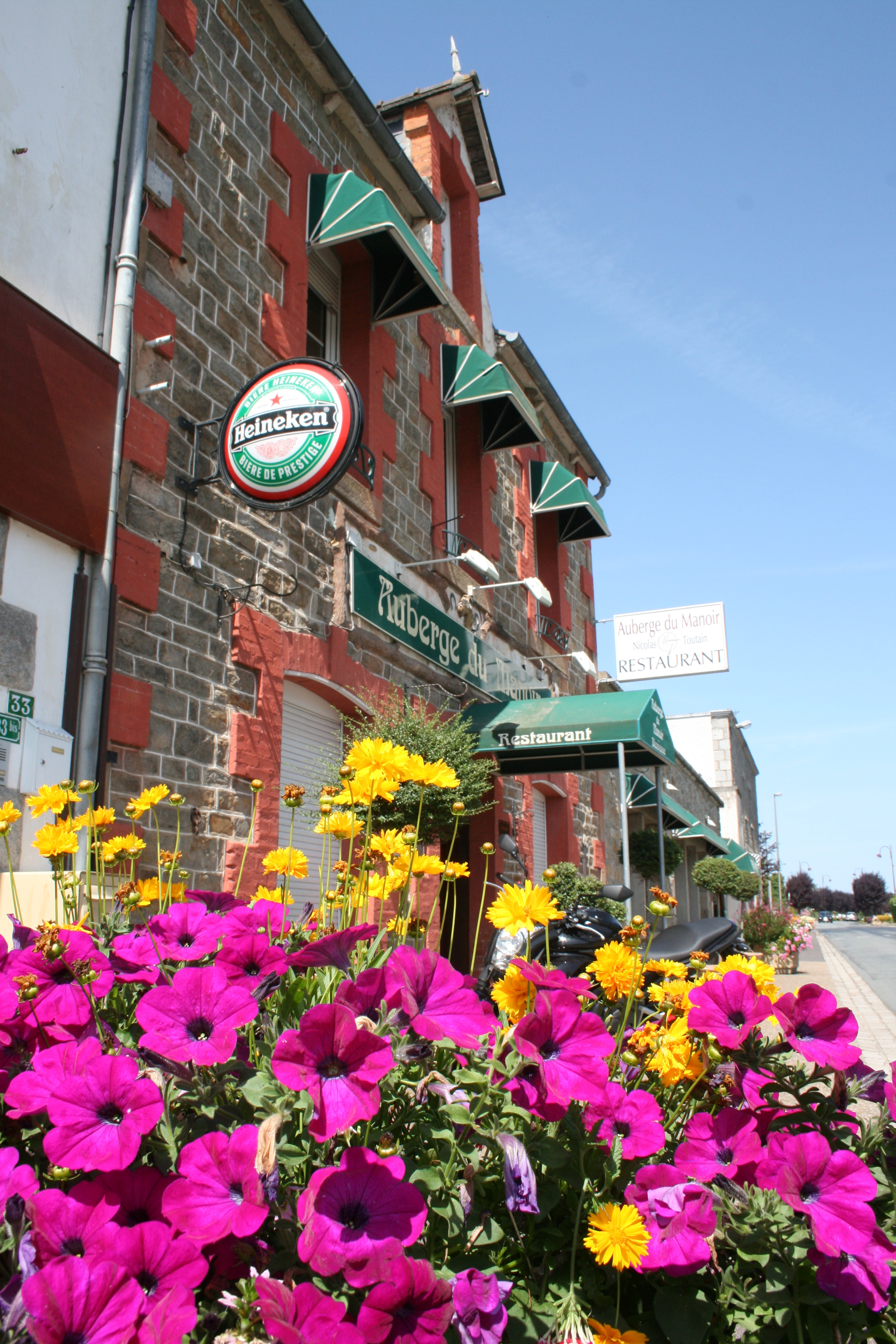
In the main street

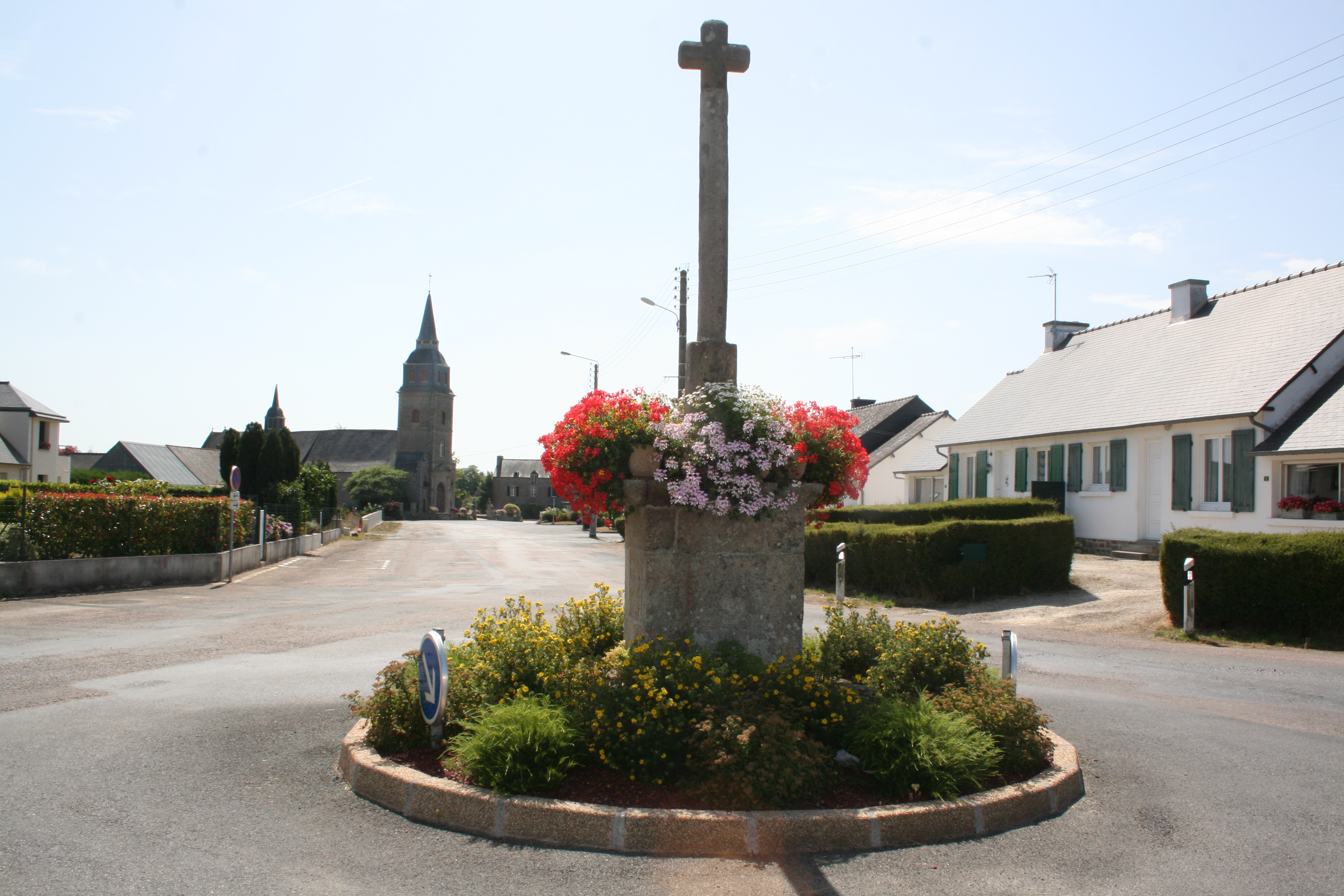
One of the Christian cross that circle the village

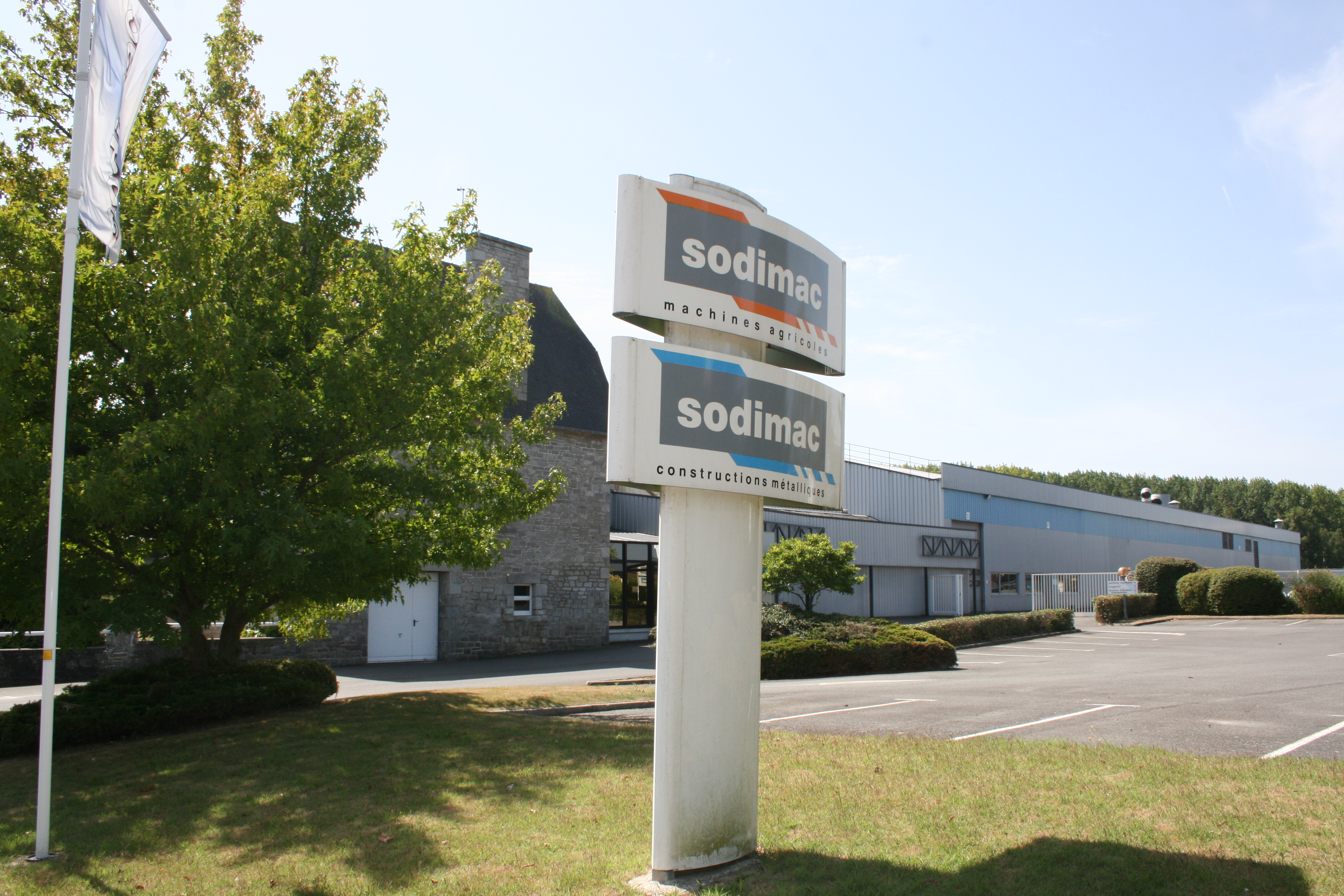
Sodimac, the main enterprise of Saint-Pôtan

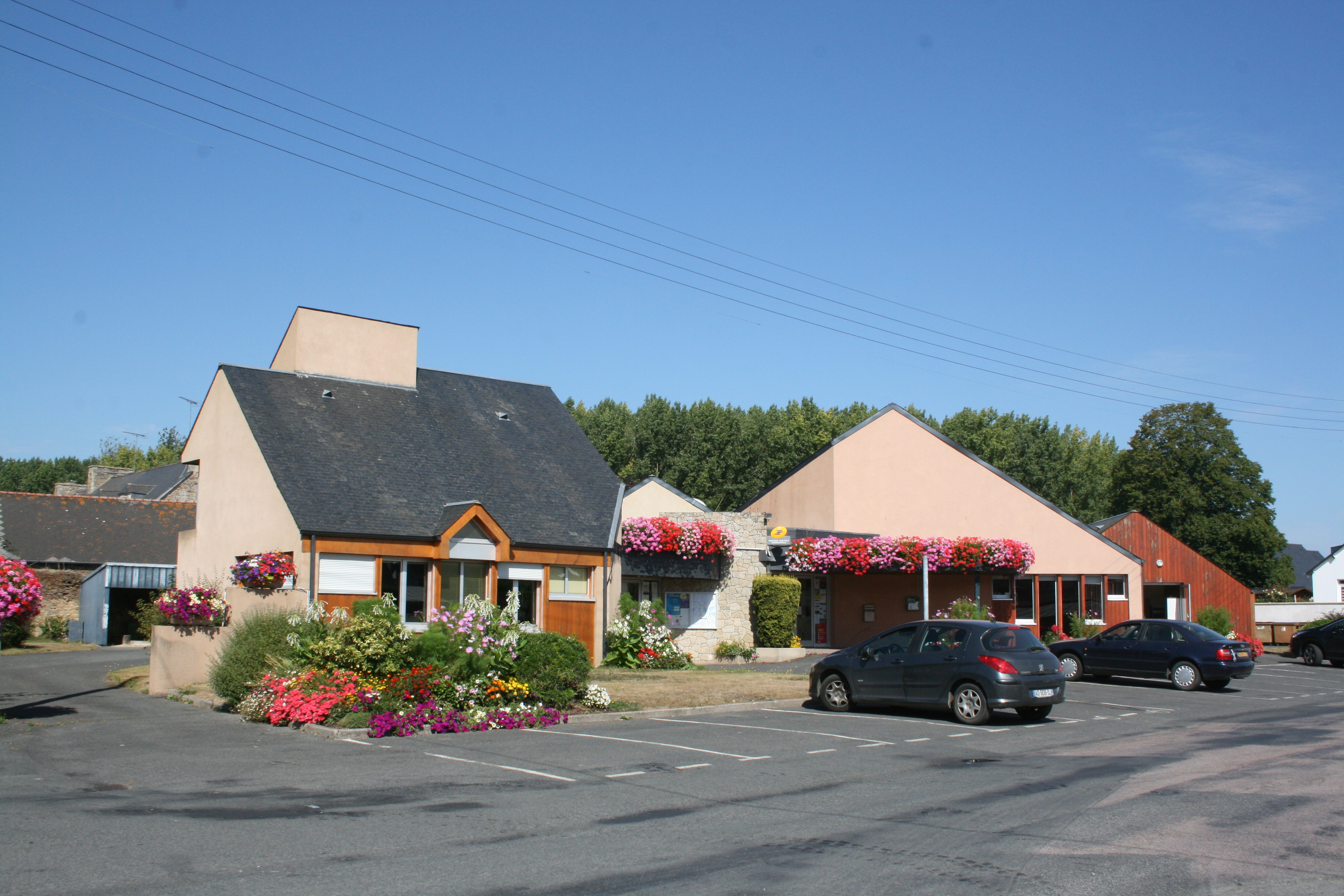
The town hall

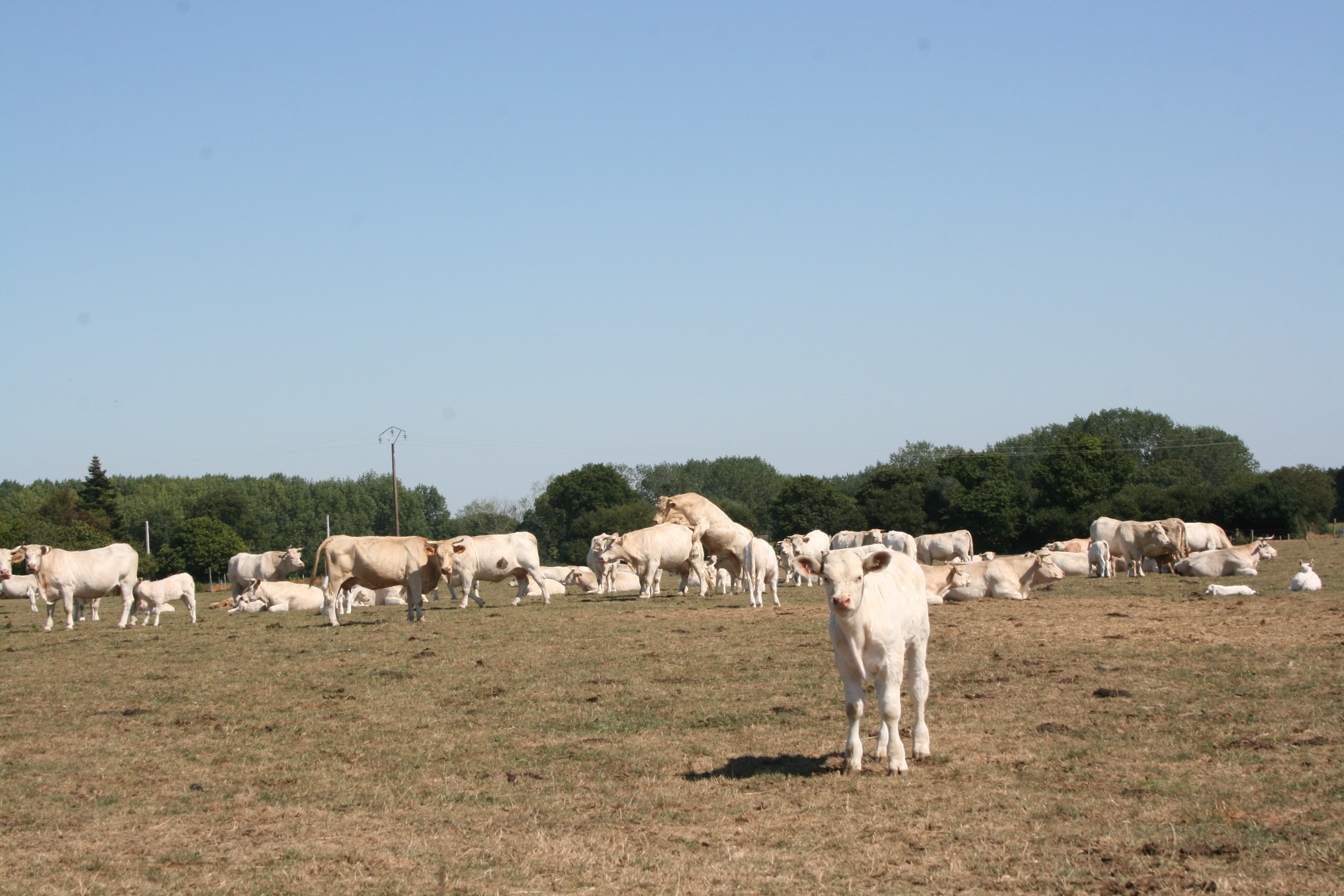
Local dairy farming

== See also ==
- Communes of the Côtes-d'Armor department
