= Ruca =

Ruca or RUCA may refer to:

- Ruca, Côtes-d'Armor, a commune in France
- Ruca (house type), a traditional Mapuche house type
- Rural–urban commuting area, a classification scheme used by the United States Census Bureau

== People ==
- Ruca (footballer, born January 1990), Portuguese footballer for Oliveira do Hospital
- Ruca (footballer, born September 1990), Portuguese footballer for Penafiel
