= Meslin =

Meslin Melin
- Part of Lamballe-Armor
- Location of Meslin
- Location within France Location within Brittany
- Coordinates: 48°26′43″N 2°34′00″W
- Country: France
- Region: Brittany
- Department: Côtes-d'Armor
- Arrondissement: Saint-Brieuc
- Canton: Lamballe-Armor
- Commune: Lamballe-Armor
- Area^{1}: 13.92 km^{2} (5.37 sq mi)
- Highest elevation: 97 m (318 ft)
- Lowest elevation: 42 m (138 ft)
- Population (2023): 901
  - Density: 64.7/km^{2} (168/sq mi)
- Time zone: UTC+01:00 (CET)
  - Summer (DST): UTC+02:00 (CEST)
- Postal code: 22400
- ^{1} French Land Register data, which excludes lakes, ponds, glaciers > 1 km^{2} (0.386 sq mi or 247 acres) and river estuaries.

Meslin (French pronunciation: [melɛ̃]; Breton: Melin) is a former commune in the Côtes-d'Armor department of Brittany in northwestern France. On 1 January 2016, it was merged into the commune Lamballe, which was merged into the new commune Lamballe-Armor on 1 January 2019. Inhabitants of Meslin are called meslinois in French.

== See also ==
- Communes of the Côtes-d'Armor department
