= Planguenoual =

Former commune in Brittany, France

Planguenoual Plangonwal
- Part of Lamballe-Armor
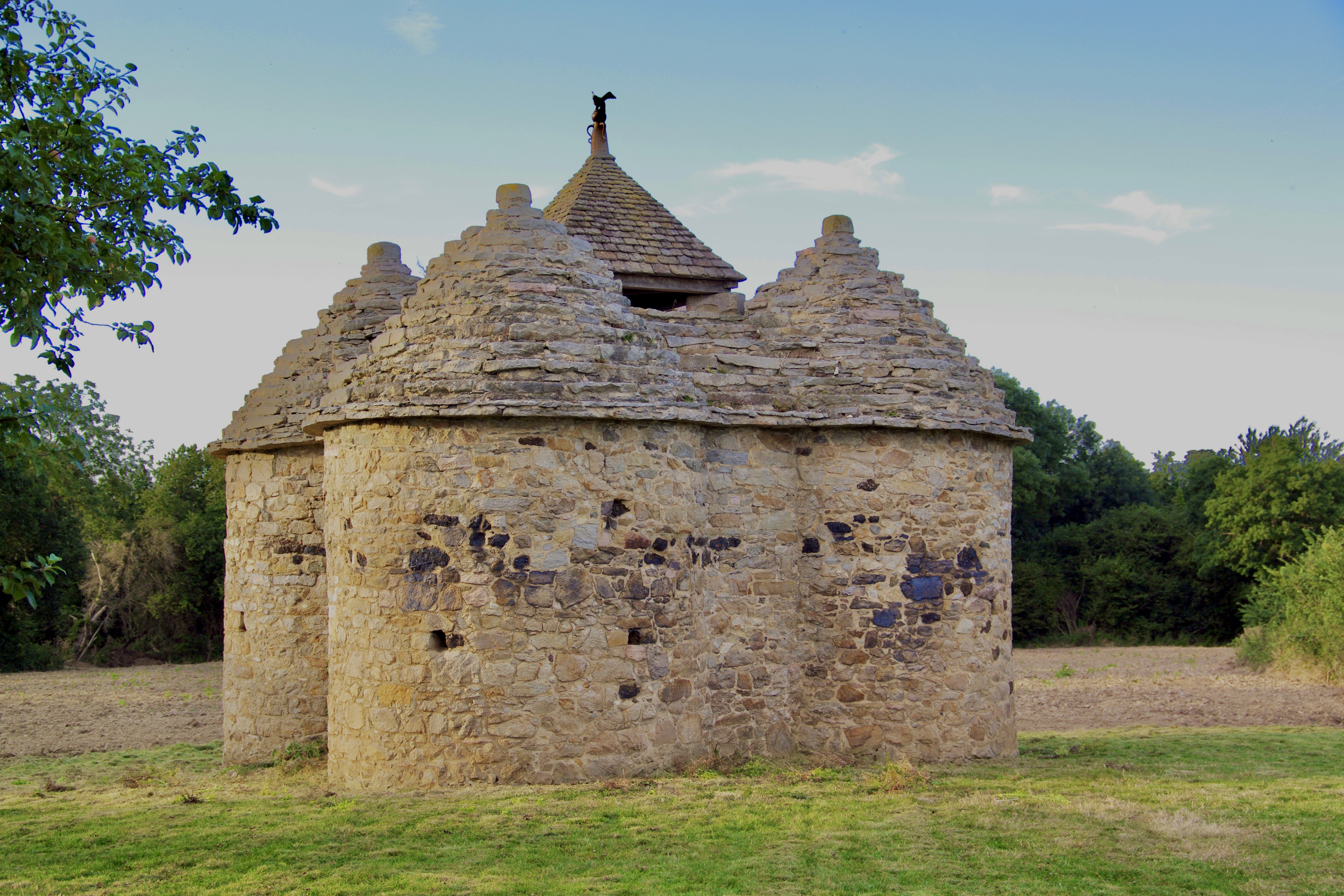
- The dovecote of the old manor of Vaujoyeux

- Coat of arms
- Location of Planguenoual
- Location within France Location within Brittany
- Coordinates: 48°32′00″N 2°34′36″W
- Country: France
- Region: Brittany
- Department: Côtes-d'Armor
- Arrondissement: Saint-Brieuc
- Canton: Pléneuf-Val-André
- Commune: Lamballe-Armor
- Area^{1}: 32.89 km^{2} (12.70 sq mi)
- Highest elevation: 127 m (417 ft)
- Lowest elevation: 0 m (0 ft)
- Population (2022): 2,213
  - Density: 67.28/km^{2} (174.3/sq mi)
- Time zone: UTC+01:00 (CET)
  - Summer (DST): UTC+02:00 (CEST)
- Postal code: 22400
- ^{1} French Land Register data, which excludes lakes, ponds, glaciers > 1 km^{2} (0.386 sq mi or 247 acres) and river estuaries.

Planguenoual (French pronunciation: [plɑ̃ɡənwal]; Breton: Plangonwal; Gallo: Plangenóau) is a former commune in the Côtes-d'Armor department of Brittany in northwestern France. On 1 January 2019, it was merged into the new commune Lamballe-Armor.

== Population ==
Inhabitants of Planguenoual are called planguenoualais in French.

Historical population
| Year | Pop. | ±% p.a. |
|---|---|---|
| 1962 | 1,513 | — |
| 1968 | 1,461 | −0.58% |
| 1975 | 1,431 | −0.30% |
| 1982 | 1,562 | +1.26% |
| 1990 | 1,518 | −0.36% |
| 1999 | 1,550 | +0.23% |
| 2006 | 1,736 | +1.63% |
| 2022 | 2,213 | +1.53% |
Source: EHESS and INSEE

== See also ==
- Communes of the Côtes-d'Armor department
