= Saint-Denoual =

Saint-Denoual Sant-Denwal
- Commune
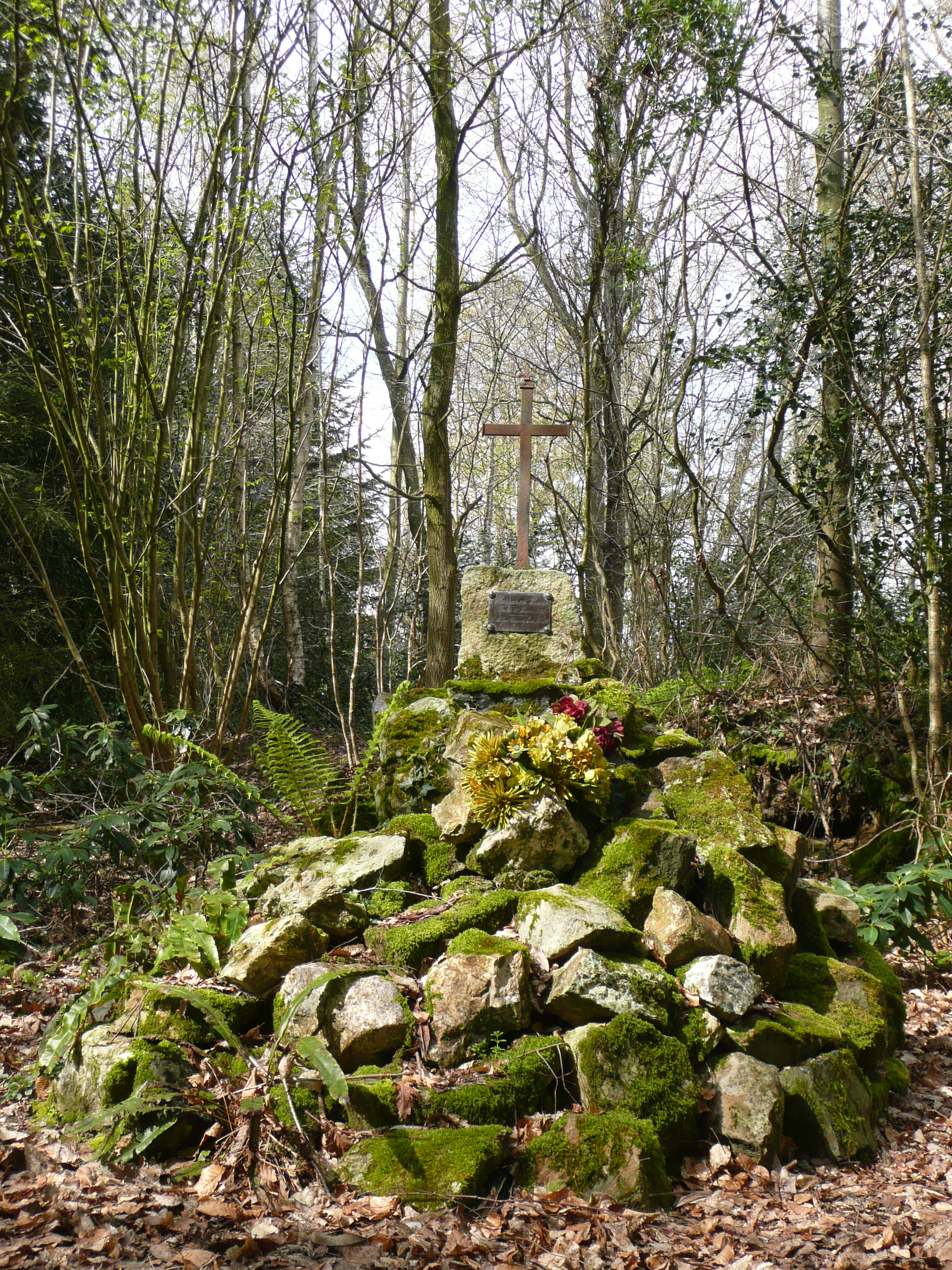
- The tomb of the Marquis de la Rouërie
- Location of Saint-Denoual
- Location within France Location within Brittany
- Coordinates: 48°31′41″N 2°23′57″W
- Country: France
- Region: Brittany
- Department: Côtes-d'Armor
- Arrondissement: Saint-Brieuc
- Canton: Pléneuf-Val-André
- Intercommunality: CA Lamballe Terre et Mer

Government
  - Mayor (2020–2026): Jérémy Allain
- Area^{1}: 8.61 km^{2} (3.32 sq mi)
- Highest elevation: 108 m (354 ft)
- Lowest elevation: 44 m (144 ft)
- Population (2023): 495
  - Density: 57.5/km^{2} (149/sq mi)
- Time zone: UTC+01:00 (CET)
  - Summer (DST): UTC+02:00 (CEST)
- INSEE/Postal code: 22286 /22400
- ^{1} French Land Register data, which excludes lakes, ponds, glaciers > 1 km^{2} (0.386 sq mi or 247 acres) and river estuaries.

Saint-Denoual (French pronunciation: [sɛ̃ dənwal]; Breton: Sant-Denwal) is a commune in the Côtes-d'Armor department of Brittany in northwestern France.

== Population ==
Historical population
Year	Pop.	±% p.a.
1968	369	—
1975	330	−1.58%
1982	342	+0.51%
1990	362	+0.71%
1999	354	−0.25%
2007	392	+1.28%
2012	411	+0.95%
2017	464	+2.46%
2023	495	+1.08%
Source: INSEE

Inhabitants of Saint-Denoual are called guinguenoualais in French.

== See also ==
- Communes of the Côtes-d'Armor department
