= Plurien =

Plurien Plurien
- Commune
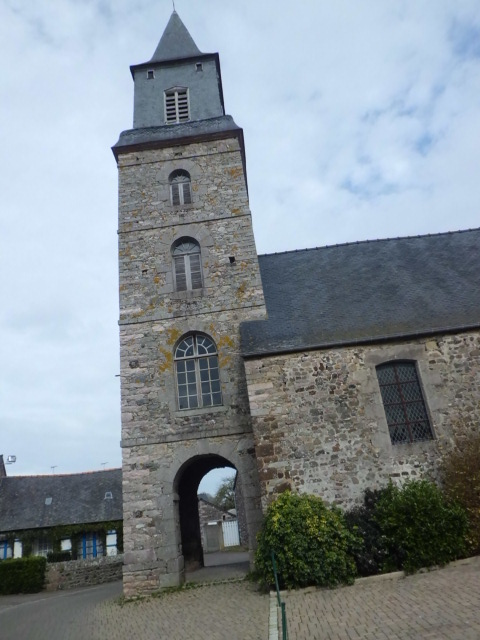
- The bell tower of the church of Saint-Pierre, in Plurien
- Location of Plurien
- Location within France Location within Brittany
- Coordinates: 48°37′36″N 2°24′10″W
- Country: France
- Region: Brittany
- Department: Côtes-d'Armor
- Arrondissement: Saint-Brieuc
- Canton: Pléneuf-Val-André
- Intercommunality: CA Lamballe Terre et Mer

Government
  - Mayor (2020–2026): Jean-Pierre Omnès
- Area^{1}: 21.65 km^{2} (8.36 sq mi)
- Highest elevation: 96 m (315 ft)
- Lowest elevation: 3 m (9.8 ft)
- Population (2023): 1,521
  - Density: 70.25/km^{2} (182.0/sq mi)
- Time zone: UTC+01:00 (CET)
  - Summer (DST): UTC+02:00 (CEST)
- INSEE/Postal code: 22242 /22240
- ^{1} French Land Register data, which excludes lakes, ponds, glaciers > 1 km^{2} (0.386 sq mi or 247 acres) and river estuaries.

Plurien (French pronunciation: [plyʁjɛ̃]; Breton: Plurien; Gallo: Pluriaen) is a commune in the Côtes-d'Armor department of Brittany in northwestern France.

== Population ==
Inhabitants of Plurien are called pluriennais in French.

== See also ==
- Communes of the Côtes-d'Armor department
