= Pléboulle =

Pléboulle Pleboull
- Commune
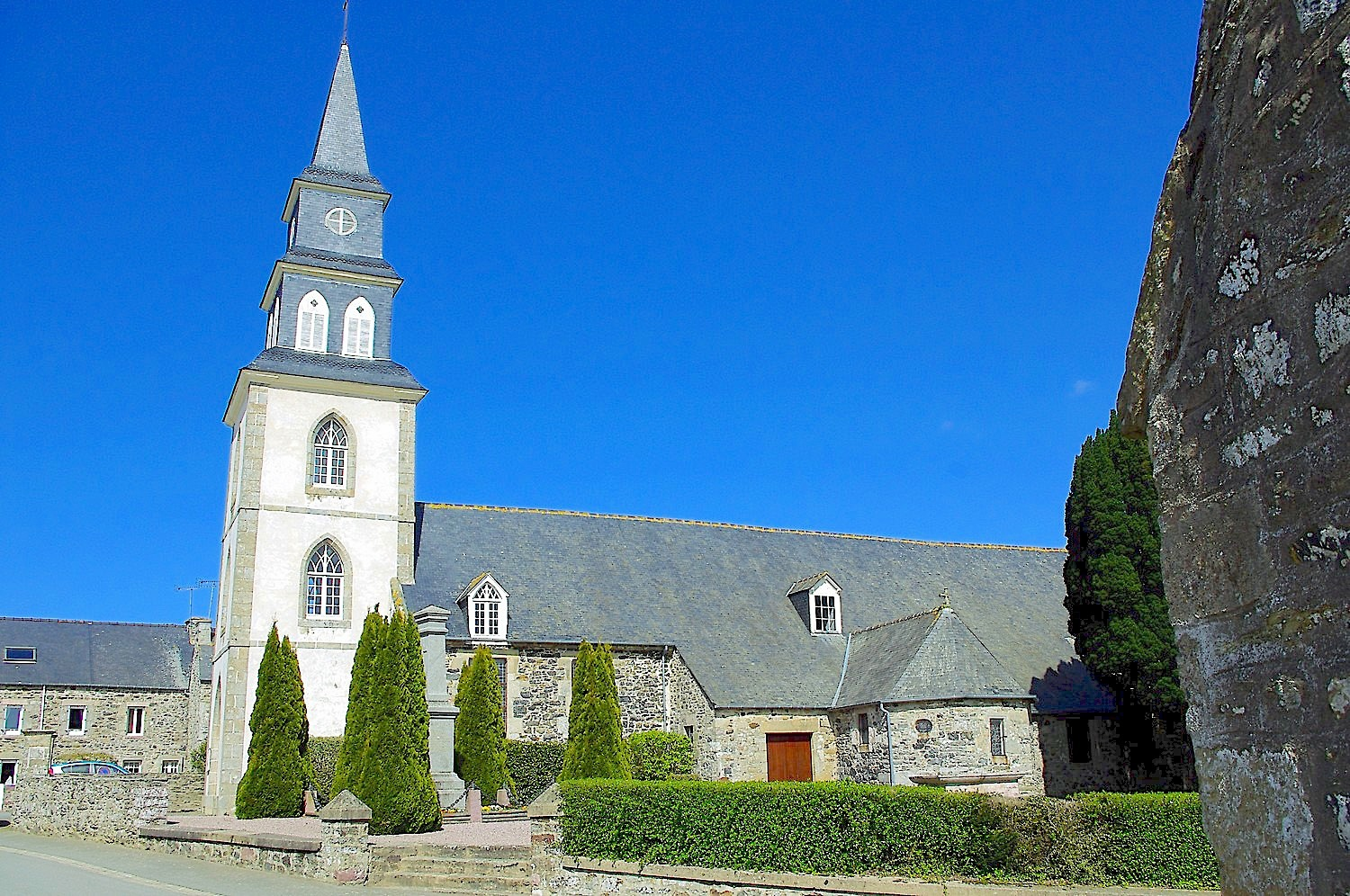
- The church of Pléboulle
- Location of Pléboulle
- Location within France Location within Brittany
- Coordinates: 48°36′34″N 2°20′14″W
- Country: France
- Region: Brittany
- Department: Côtes-d'Armor
- Arrondissement: Dinan
- Canton: Pléneuf-Val-André
- Intercommunality: Dinan Agglomération

Government
  - Mayor (2020–2026): Myriam Cherdel
- Area^{1}: 14.10 km^{2} (5.44 sq mi)
- Highest elevation: 67 m (220 ft)
- Lowest elevation: 0 m (0 ft)
- Population (2023): 721
  - Density: 51.1/km^{2} (132/sq mi)
- Time zone: UTC+01:00 (CET)
  - Summer (DST): UTC+02:00 (CEST)
- INSEE/Postal code: 22174 /22550
- ^{1} French Land Register data, which excludes lakes, ponds, glaciers > 1 km^{2} (0.386 sq mi or 247 acres) and river estuaries.

Pléboulle (French pronunciation: [plebul]; Breton: Pleboull; Gallo: Plébóll) is a commune in the Côtes-d'Armor department of Brittany in northwestern France.

== Population ==
Historical population
Year	Pop.	±% p.a.
1968	780	—
1975	711	−1.31%
1982	686	−0.51%
1990	711	+0.45%
1999	662	−0.79%
2007	719	+1.04%
2012	730	+0.30%
2017	862	+3.38%
2023	721	−2.93%
Source: INSEE

Inhabitants of Pléboulle are called pléboullais in French.

== See also ==
- Communes of the Côtes-d'Armor department
