= Hénanbihen =

Hénanbihen Henant-Bihan
- Commune
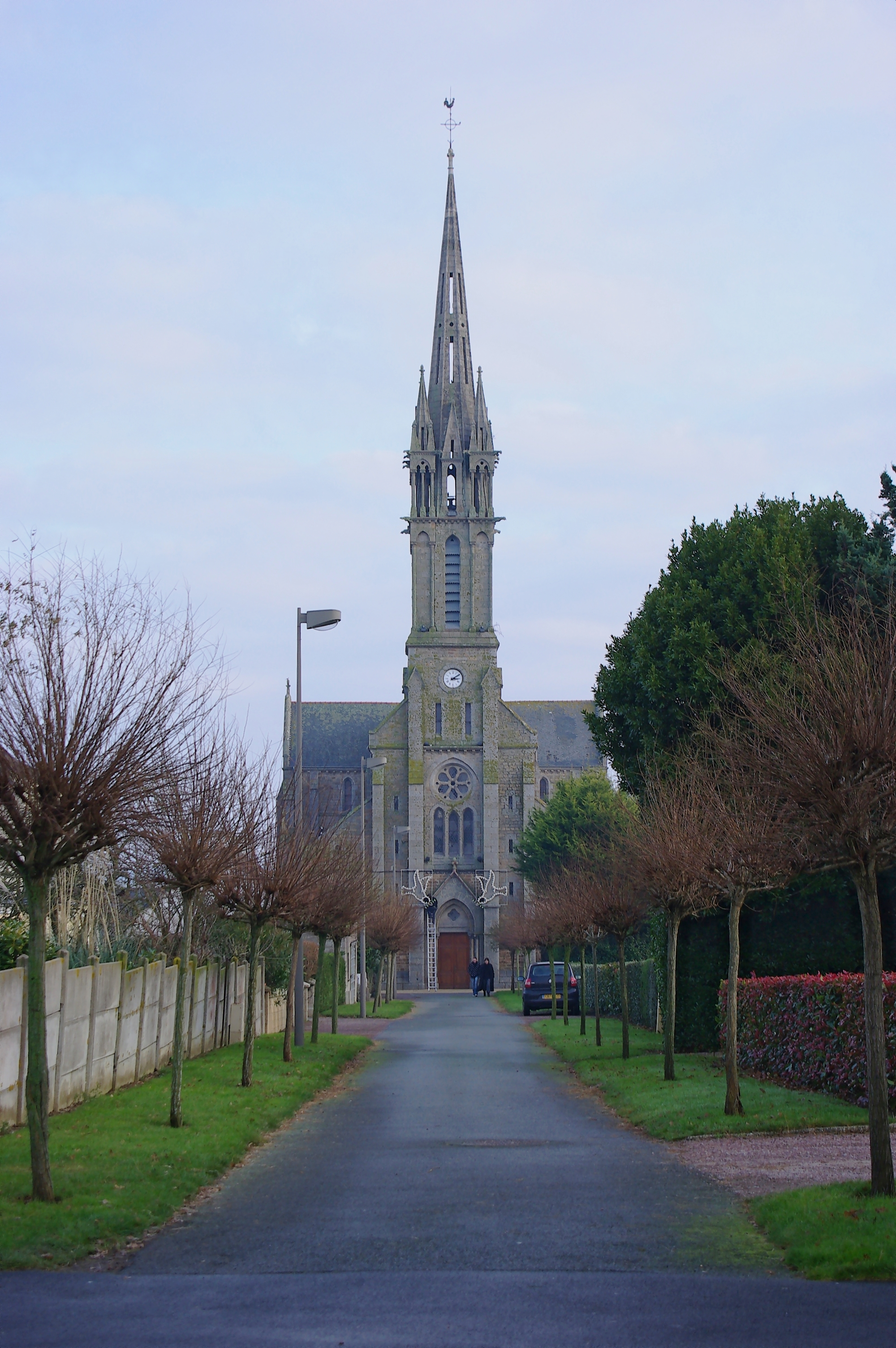
- Saint-Nicolas and Saint-Guillaume church

- Coat of arms
- Location of Hénanbihen
- Location within France Location within Brittany
- Coordinates: 48°33′41″N 2°22′33″W
- Country: France
- Region: Brittany
- Department: Côtes-d'Armor
- Arrondissement: Saint-Brieuc
- Canton: Pléneuf-Val-André
- Intercommunality: CA Lamballe Terre et Mer

Government
  - Mayor (2020–2026): Jean-Michel Lebret
- Area^{1}: 31.65 km^{2} (12.22 sq mi)
- Highest elevation: 102 m (335 ft)
- Lowest elevation: 7 m (23 ft)
- Population (2023): 1,479
  - Density: 46.73/km^{2} (121.0/sq mi)
- Time zone: UTC+01:00 (CET)
  - Summer (DST): UTC+02:00 (CEST)
- INSEE/Postal code: 22076 /22550
- ^{1} French Land Register data, which excludes lakes, ponds, glaciers > 1 km^{2} (0.386 sq mi or 247 acres) and river estuaries.

Hénanbihen (French pronunciation: [enɑ̃biɛ̃]; Breton: Henant-Bihan; Gallo: Henaunt-Bihaen) is a commune in the Côtes-d'Armor department of Brittany in northwestern France.

== Population ==
Historical population
Year	Pop.	±% p.a.
1968	1,431	—
1975	1,390	−0.41%
1982	1,404	+0.14%
1990	1,346	−0.53%
1999	1,294	−0.44%
2007	1,316	+0.21%
2012	1,394	+1.16%
2017	1,314	−1.18%
2023	1,479	+1.99%
Source: INSEE

Inhabitants of Hénanbihen are called hénanbihannais or hénanbihennais in French.

== See also ==
- Communes of the Côtes-d'Armor department
