= Morieux =

Morieux Morieg
- Part of Lamballe-Armor
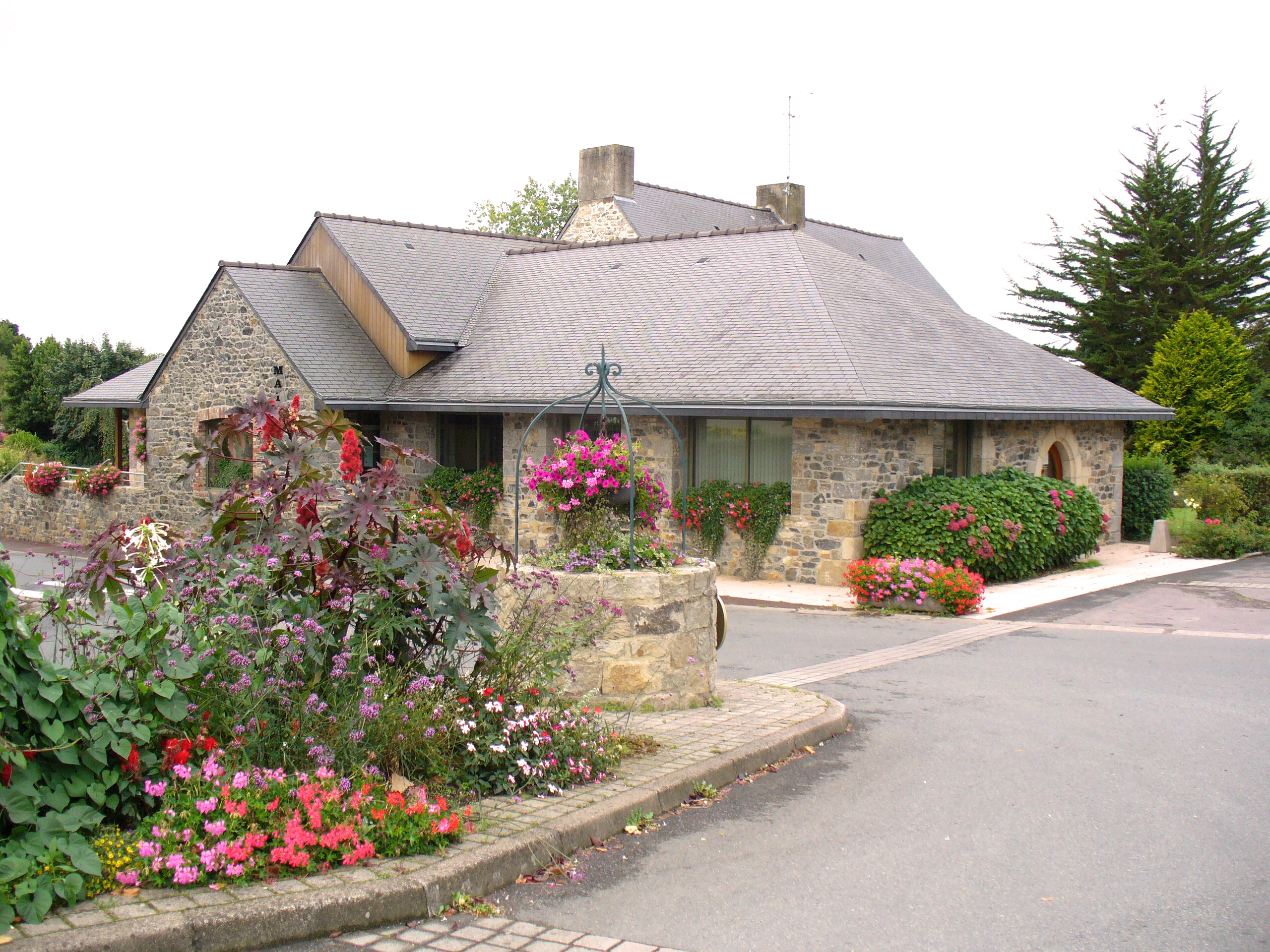
- Town hall
- Location of Morieux
- Location within France Location within Brittany
- Coordinates: 48°31′21″N 2°36′26″W
- Country: France
- Region: Brittany
- Department: Côtes-d'Armor
- Arrondissement: Saint-Brieuc
- Canton: Lamballe-Armor
- Commune: Lamballe-Armor
- Area^{1}: 7.55 km^{2} (2.92 sq mi)
- Highest elevation: 105 m (344 ft)
- Lowest elevation: 0 m (0 ft)
- Population (2022): 1,058
  - Density: 140/km^{2} (363/sq mi)
- Time zone: UTC+01:00 (CET)
  - Summer (DST): UTC+02:00 (CEST)
- Postal code: 22400
- ^{1} French Land Register data, which excludes lakes, ponds, glaciers > 1 km^{2} (0.386 sq mi or 247 acres) and river estuaries.

Morieux (French pronunciation: [mɔʁjø]; Breton: Morieg; Gallo: Morioec) is a former commune in the Côtes-d'Armor department of Brittany in northwestern France. On 1 January 2019, it was merged into the new commune Lamballe-Armor.

== Population ==
People from Morieux are called morivains in French.

Historical population
Year	Pop.	±% p.a.
1962	481	—
1968	482	+0.03%
1975	505	+0.67%
1982	615	+2.86%
1990	665	+0.98%
1999	765	+1.57%
2006	843	+1.40%
2022	1,058	+1.43%
Source: EHESS and INSEE

== See also ==
- Communes of the Côtes-d'Armor department
