= Erquy =

Erquy Erge-ar-Mor
- Commune
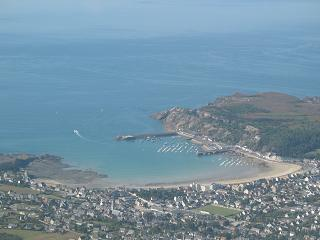
- Aerial view

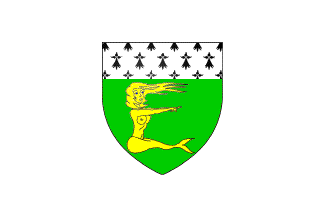
- Flag Coat of arms
- Location of Erquy
- Location within France Location within Brittany
- Coordinates: 48°37′57″N 2°27′47″W
- Country: France
- Region: Brittany
- Department: Côtes-d'Armor
- Arrondissement: Saint-Brieuc
- Canton: Pléneuf-Val-André
- Intercommunality: CA Lamballe Terre et Mer

Government
  - Mayor (2020–2026): Henri Labbé
- Area^{1}: 26.46 km^{2} (10.22 sq mi)
- Highest elevation: 116 m (381 ft)
- Lowest elevation: 0 m (0 ft)
- Population (2023): 3,974
  - Density: 150.2/km^{2} (389.0/sq mi)
- Time zone: UTC+01:00 (CET)
  - Summer (DST): UTC+02:00 (CEST)
- INSEE/Postal code: 22054 /22430
- ^{1} French Land Register data, which excludes lakes, ponds, glaciers > 1 km^{2} (0.386 sq mi or 247 acres) and river estuaries.

Erquy (French pronunciation: [ɛʁki]; Breton: Erge-ar-Mor; Gallo: Erqi) is a commune in the Côtes-d'Armor department of Brittany in northwestern France.

Erquy is located in a cove of the Penthièvre coast bordered by cape Erquy on one side and a volcanic rock formation called pointe de la Heussaye on the other. Its harbour shelters a flotilla of about 80 trawlers, earning the town a reputation as the scallop "capital". The shellfish are collected in the Saint-Brieuc bay.

It is a popular summer destination, known for its ten fine sand beaches and pink sandstone houses.

Erquy claims to be the inspiration behind the village of the Asterix comics, which is situated in roughly the same place in ancient Armorica (now Brittany); this would make the villagers likely Coriosolites, a tribe who lived in that area.

== Population ==
Inhabitants of Erquy are called Réginéens or Erquiais in French.

Historical population
Year	Pop.	±% p.a.
1968	2,998	—
1975	3,347	+1.59%
1982	3,426	+0.33%
1990	3,568	+0.51%
1999	3,760	+0.58%
2007	3,764	+0.01%
2012	3,898	+0.70%
2017	3,910	+0.06%
2023	3,974	+0.27%
Source: INSEE

== Geography ==
Erquy offers a variety of natural landscapes: pink sandstone cliffs and rocks, wild heathland, pinewoods, beaches, dunes and a transparent emerald sea.

Some coastal paths run along pink sandstone cliffs of Cape Erquy and Cape Fréhel. The heathland of Cape Erquy is designated as a protected nature reserve and is recognized as a notable environment within the Côtes-d'Armor department.Formerly used for agriculture, the reserve supports various species of heather and gorse.

Erquy's ten beaches come in all shapes and sizes: from the small coves bordered by heathland north of the cape to the large expanses of Caroual and Saint-Pabu.

During the summer season, the population is multiplied by seven and can go as high as 30 000 inhabitants. In just a few years, Erquy has become the most active town of the Penthièvre coast economically, commercially, culturally as well as in sports.

== History ==
Erquy and its neighbouring hamlets are rich in heritage with chapels, mansions, lighthouses, a dolmen and a castle. Besides being a harbour, Erquy used to shelter an active pink sandstone quarry and the small pink Tu-Es-Roc village is a testimony of that activity. Nowadays, a trail with interpretative panels allows visitors to explore the former quarry whose pits have become ponds: Les Lacs Bleus.

The jewel of its past is the Château de Bienassis, a pink sandstone castle.

Other interesting pieces of heritage in Erquy include:
- The guardhouse at Trois Pierres which was built in 1744 as part of a vast defensive system instigated by Louis XV who formed coast guard companies and stationed batteries and guardhouses along the whole Breton coast.
- A cannonball oven which was completed in 1794. The cannonballs were heated until they were red-hot so they could set enemy ships on fire.
- The Saint-Michel Chapel: this picturesque chapel is located on a tiny island, Îlot Saint-Michel, linked to the coast by a natural pebble causeway covered by the sea at high tide.
- The Caroual viaduct: built by Harel de la Noë, it enabled the first trains to run from the towns of Côtes-d'Armor to Erquy from 1922 onwards.

The fishing harbour:
Erquy became an important fishing port following the discovery of clam banks in the early 1950s and of scallop banks in 1962. Since then, it has been rated one of the important scallop ports in Europe.

== Cultural significance ==
Erquy and two other harbours, Saint-Quay-Portrieux and Loguivy-de-la-Mer/Paimpol, organise every year and in turn a scallop festival : La Fête de la Coquille Saint-Jacques.

== See also ==
- Communes of the Côtes-d'Armor department
