= Îlot Saint-Michel =

Uninhabited island in Côtes-d'Armor, France

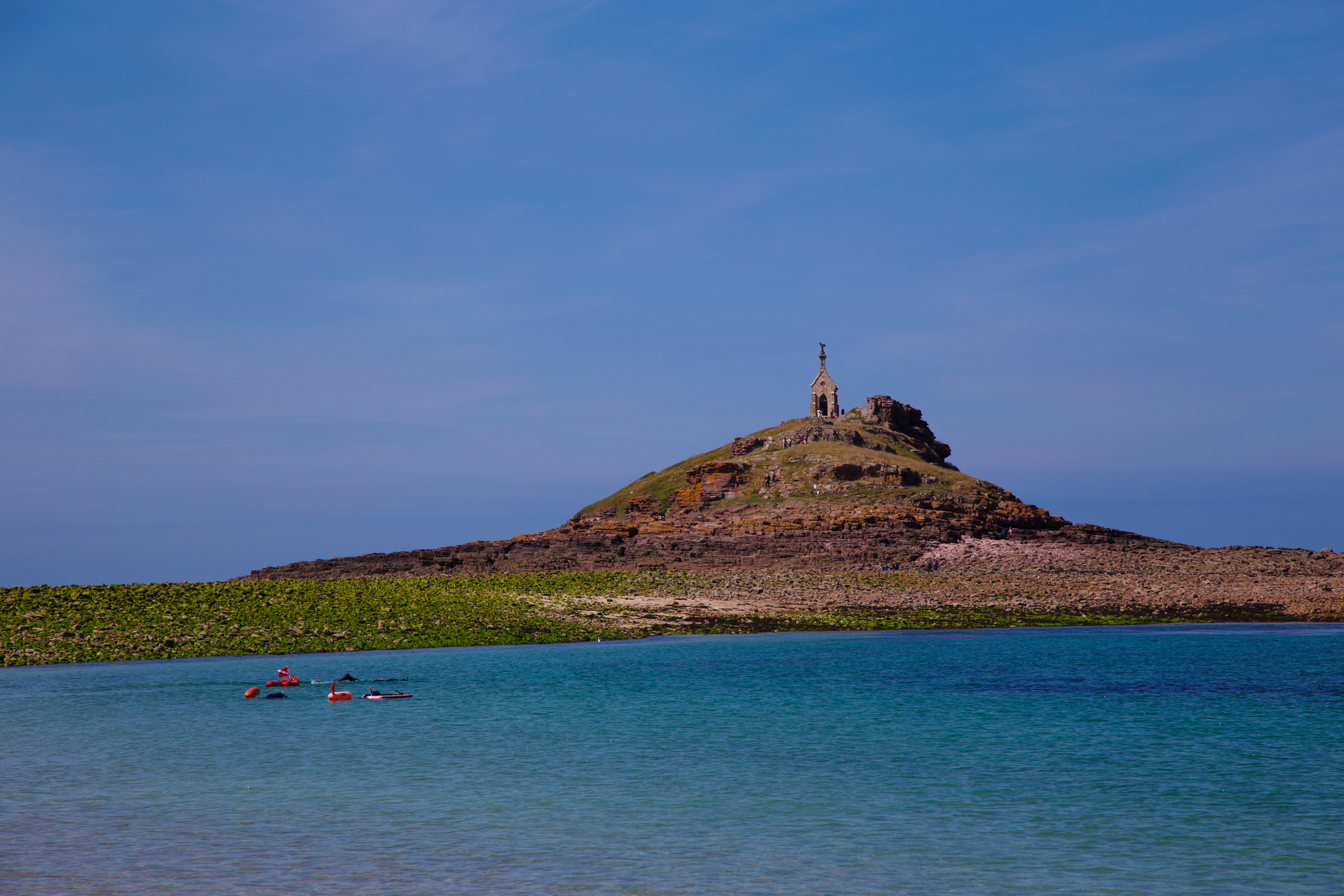
- Îlot Saint-Michel

- Location within Brittany

Geography
- Location: Atlantic Ocean
- Coordinates: 48°39′19″N 2°25′32″W
- Adjacent to: English Channel
- Total islands: 1
- Area: .7695 km^{2} (0.2971 sq mi)

Administration
- France
- Commune: Erquy
- Department: Côtes-d'Armor
- Region: Brittany

Demographics
- Population: 0

Îlot Saint-Michel (Saint Michael Island; Breton: Enez Sant Mikel) is an uninhabited island in the English Channel off the coast of Brittany in Côtes-d'Armor, France, near the resort of Sables-d'Or-les-Pins. It is part of the commune of Erquy and is accessible by foot during low tide.

Located on the island is a small chapel, La Chapelle Saint-Michel de Rochecoul. The late 19th-century chapel replaced earlier structures that have been on the island since the Middle Ages, and was completely renovated in the 21st century. The chapel is a place of pilgrimage for locals each 29 September for the Feast day of Saint Michael.

== Toponymy ==
The island takes its name from the chapel dedicated to the Archangel Michael. According to local mythology: in the ancient time when the island was connected to the mainland, the devil was traveling nearby and Saint Michael wanted to stop him. The devil decided to pursue the saint himself and followed him. The archangel walked towards the sea, and when he arrived on the furthest point of the land that forms the island today, he looked back and stamped his foot. The land split and the sea poured in, and the devil and his imps were dragged into the sea. Since then, the devil no longer came to earth. In memory of this miracle, a chapel was later built on the island and dedicated to Saint Michael, at which time the island rock turned red. An alternate version is that the rocks turned red when Saint Michael stamped his foot on the ground.

== History ==
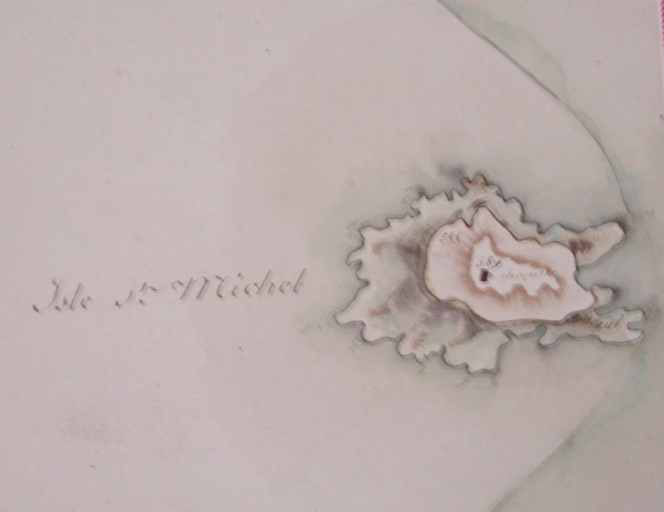
Map of Îlot Saint-Michel from 1810

The original church was founded by Cistercian monks of the Abbaye Saint-Aubin des Bois. The first mention of the island was in 1249, when a wealthy woman named Haîssa bequeathed 12 deniers to the church on Roche au Nai (Nai Rock). Over time the chapel became the property of the local municipality. In 1640, the rectors lobbied for the chapel to be returned to the monks.

In 1725, the rector wrote: "There is a chapel under the invocation of Saint Michael three-quarters of a league from town, built on a rock out in the sea, whose passage is prevented by the tide, forcing the Bernardine monks to say Mass every year on the Feast of Saint Michael on the beach in a rocky area covered with a sail. This puts the Holy Sacrifice of the Mass in great danger of an accident. The monseigneur forbade them from celebrating Mass in the sail, however, it has always been continued in the same place by the religious."

The rocks were later called les roches prêcheresses ("the preaching rocks"). In 1770, the island became communal property. Its last known inhabitant was a hermit who lived there in the 19th century.

== Chapel ==
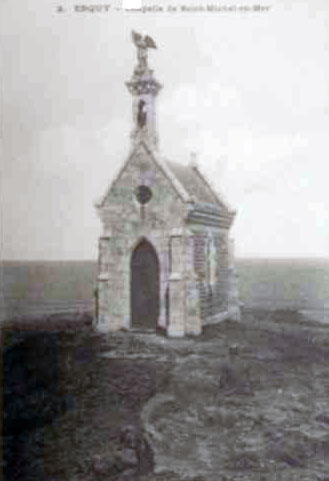
Chapel of Saint Michael in 1889, after the renovation

The chapel is constructed of pink sandstone in the gothic style. It survived the French Revolution and was included in the land registry of 1810.

By 1879, the chapel was completely dilapidated. In 1880, the municipality, along with funds from a public subscription, raised money to build a new chapel. Designed by architect Jules Morvan of Saint-Brieuc, the chapel was blessed 9 October 1881. The steeple is topped with a cast iron statue of Archangel Michael slaying the devil.

During the German occupation of France in World War II, the church was unused, as landmines in the dunes made it too dangerous to access. A German shell fired during a military drill struck the steeple of the chapel and caused it to collapse. It was rebuilt after the war, and worship at the church resumed for a while. Within a few years it fell into disuse, and was only used by fishermen seeking shelter in bad weather. A statue of Saint Michael, the furniture, and even the door were all stolen.

During the Great Storm of 1987, gale-force winds knocked the steeple over again, breaking the wings of the Archangel Michael. The city repaired the damage but still the chapel was only used for shelter for fishermen.

The chapel underwent a massive renovation in 2002–04, sponsored by the "Friends of the La Chapelle Saint-Michel" Association, with the financial support of the commune of Erquy, the General Council of Côtes-d'Armor, the Regional Council of Brittany, and the Langlois Foundation. A team of volunteers helped pull 15 tons of material to the top of the island via boats. Nearly 1,000 people came out for Feast day of Saint Michael 2003 with an outdoor Mass and a procession to the church.

In addition to the annual Feast day of Saint Michael in September, a pardon is held every August, featuring an outdoor mass in the morning followed by a procession to the chapel and a picnic.

== Photos ==
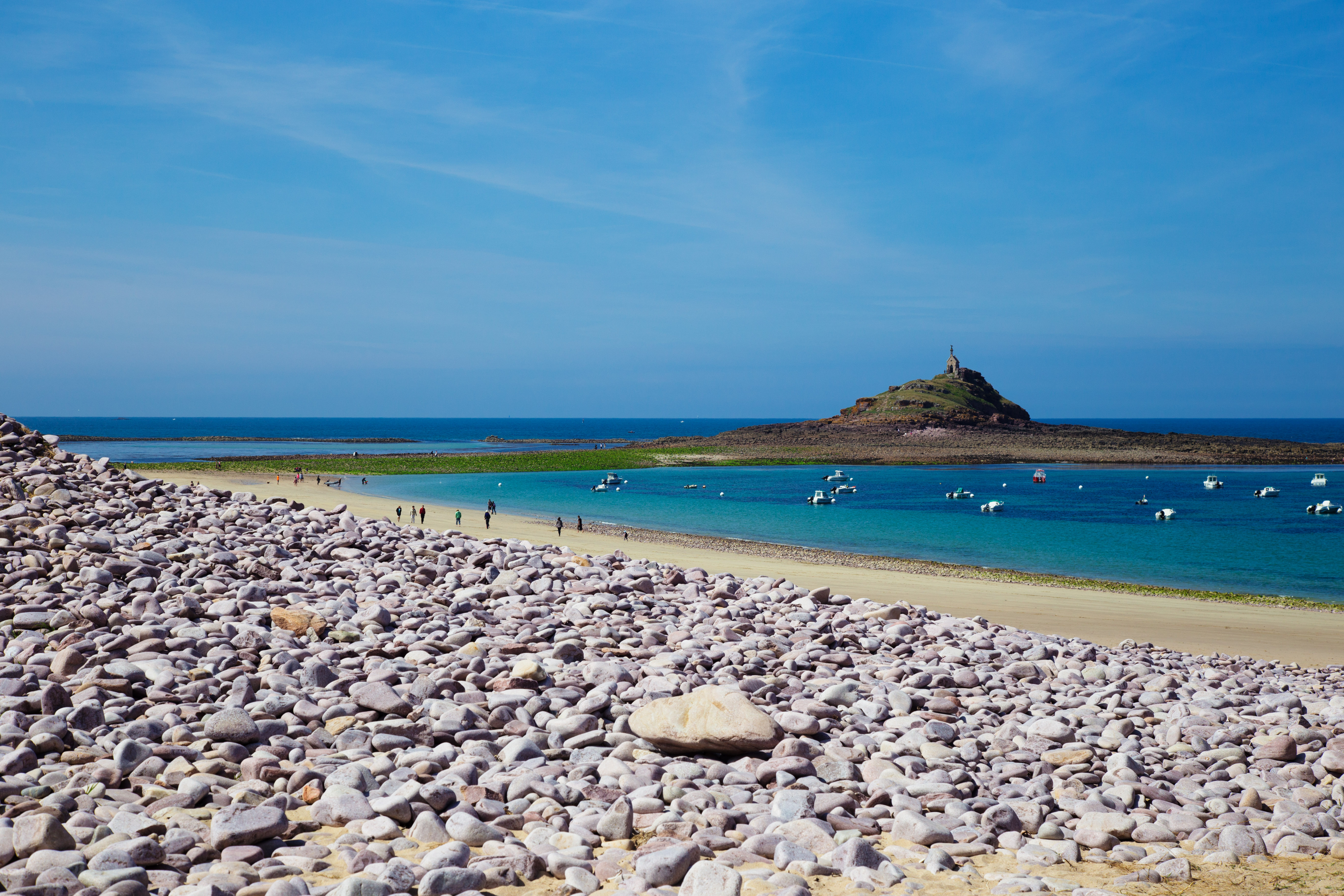
The island seen from the shore

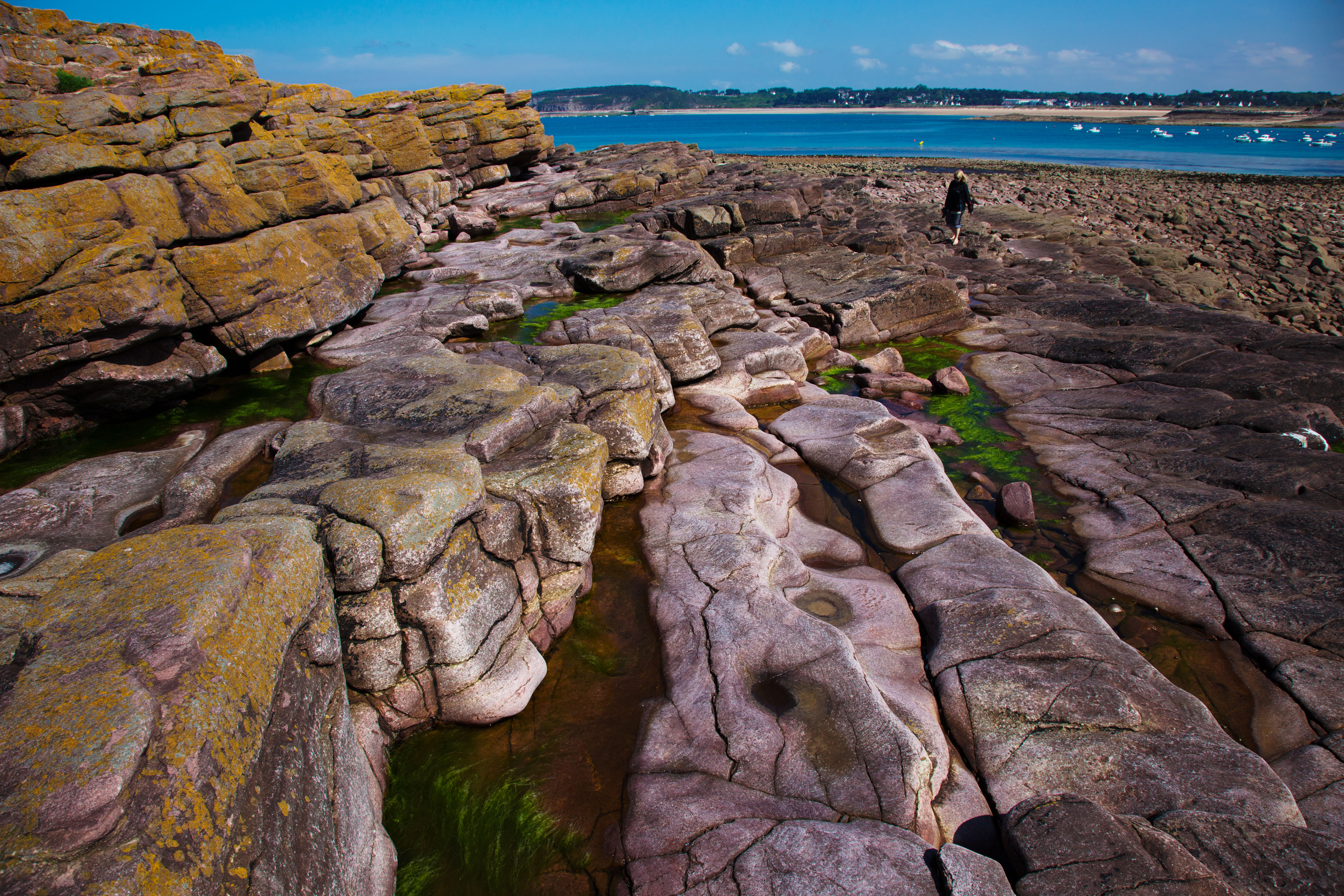
Tidepools

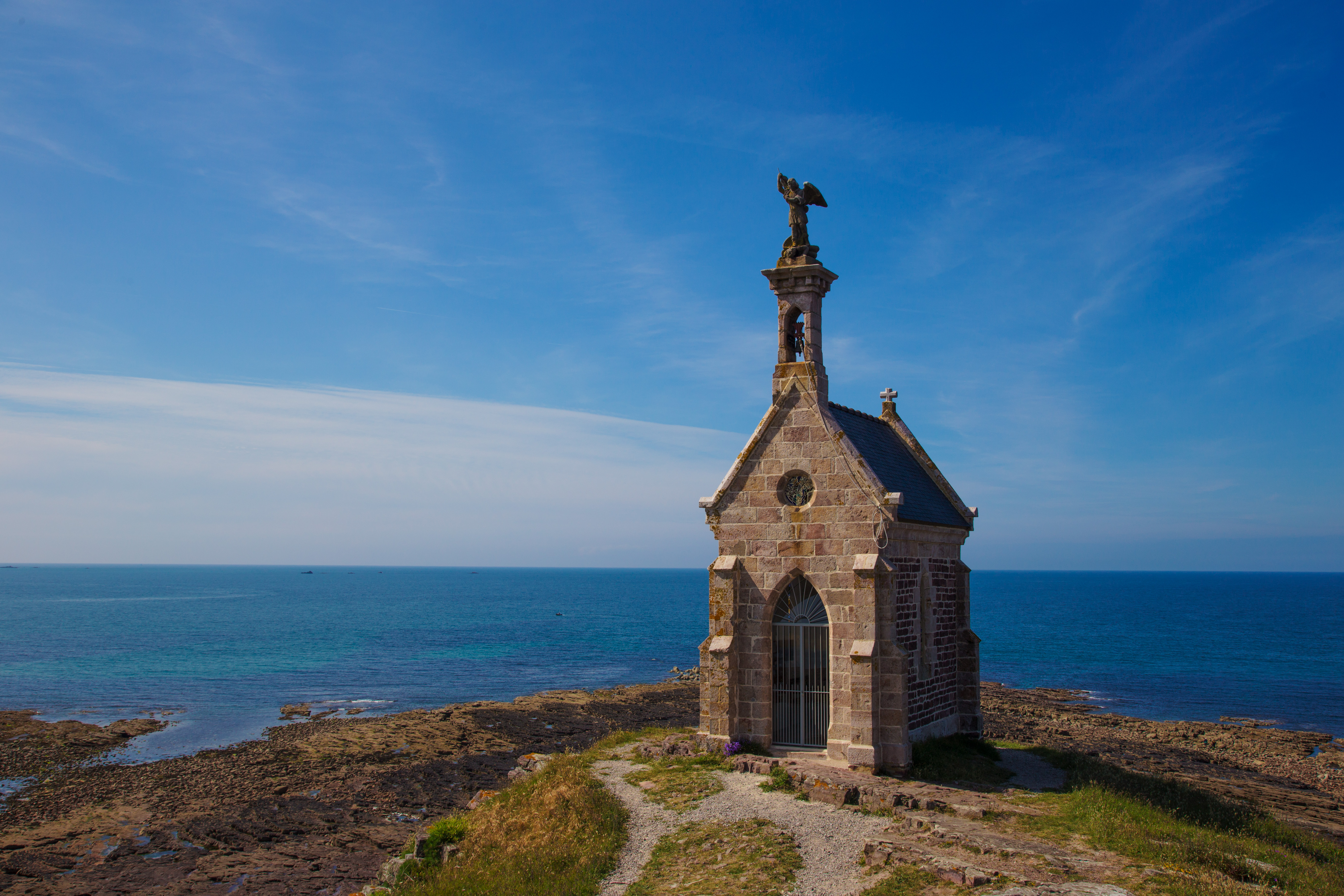
La Chapelle Saint-Michel

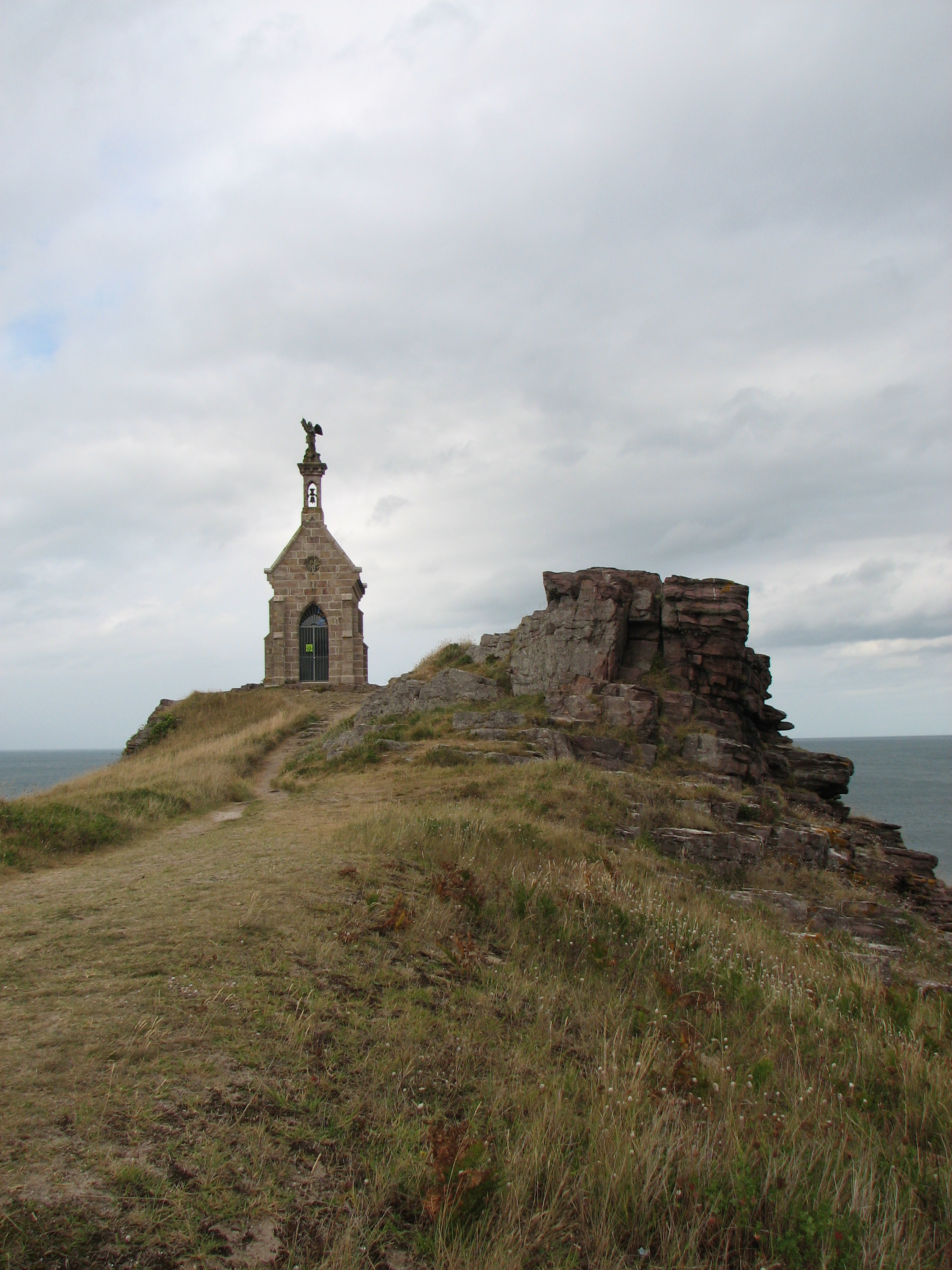
La Chapelle Saint-Michel

== See also ==
- List of islands of France
