= Canton of Pléneuf-Val-André =

Coordinates: 48.58°N 2.54°W

The canton of Pléneuf-Val-André is an administrative division of the Côtes-d'Armor department, northwestern France. Its borders were modified at the French canton reorganisation which came into effect in March 2015. Its seat is in Pléneuf-Val-André.

It consists of the following communes:

1. La Bouillie
2. Erquy
3. Fréhel
4. Hénanbihen
5. Lamballe-Armor (partly)
6. Matignon
7. Pléboulle
8. Pléneuf-Val-André
9. Plévenon
10. Plurien
11. Ruca
12. Saint-Alban
13. Saint-Cast-le-Guildo
14. Saint-Denoual
15. Saint-Pôtan
