= Lamballe =

Commune in Côtes-d'Armor, France

Lamballe Lambal
- Part of Lamballe-Armor
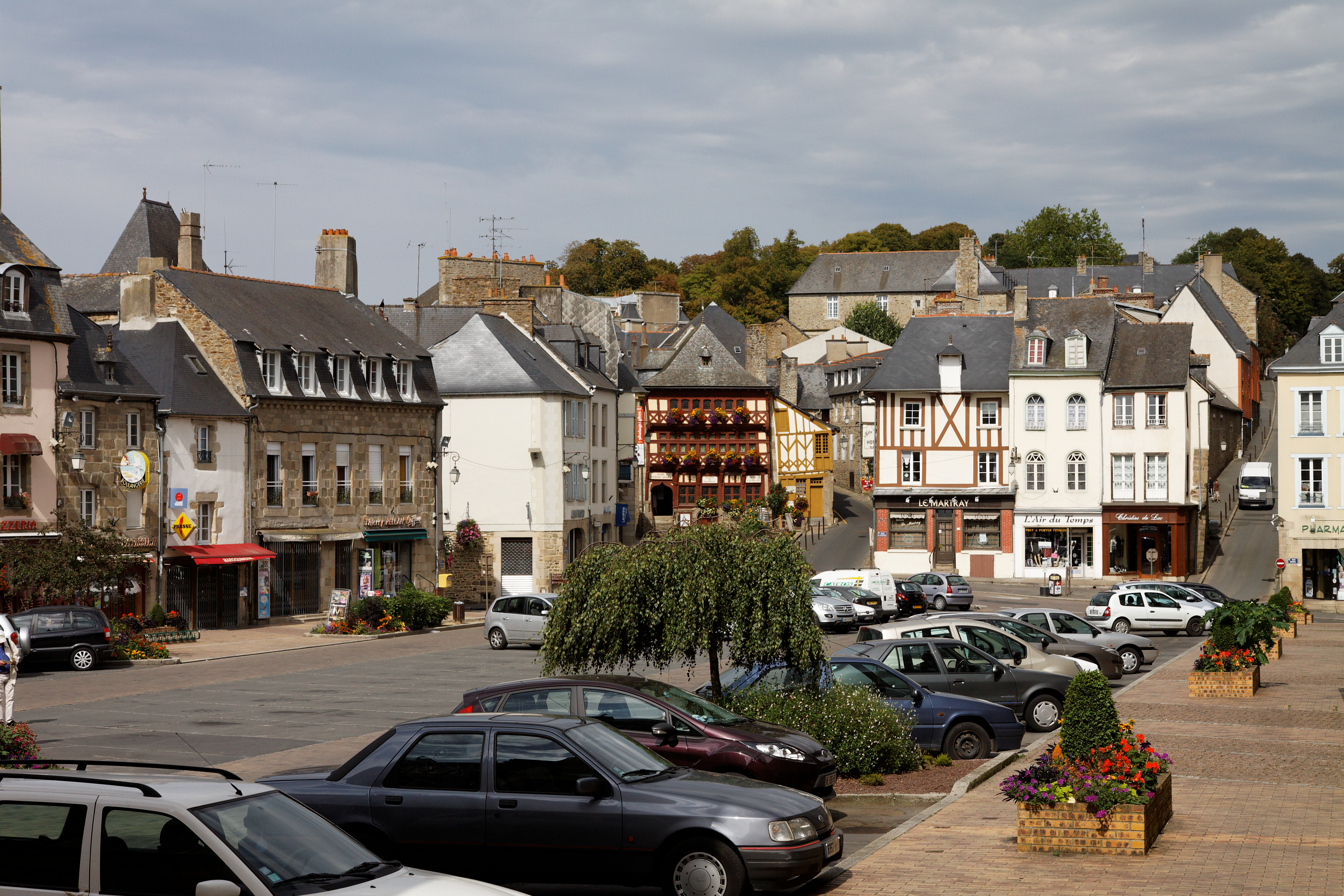

- Coat of arms
- Location of Lamballe
- Location within France Location within Brittany
- Coordinates: 48°28′10″N 2°31′00″W
- Country: France
- Region: Brittany
- Department: Côtes-d'Armor
- Arrondissement: Saint-Brieuc
- Canton: Lamballe-Armor
- Commune: Lamballe-Armor
- Area^{1}: 90.21 km^{2} (34.83 sq mi)
- Highest elevation: 131 m (430 ft)
- Lowest elevation: 37 m (121 ft)
- Population (2022): 12,742
  - Density: 141.2/km^{2} (365.8/sq mi)
- Time zone: UTC+01:00 (CET)
  - Summer (DST): UTC+02:00 (CEST)
- Postal code: 22400
- ^{1} French Land Register data, which excludes lakes, ponds, glaciers > 1 km^{2} (0.386 sq mi or 247 acres) and river estuaries.

Lamballe (French pronunciation: [lɑ̃bal]; Breton: Lambal; Gallo: Lanball) is a town and a former commune in the Côtes-d'Armor department in Brittany in northwestern France. On 1 January 2019, it was merged into the new commune Lamballe-Armor.

It lies on the river Gouessant 13 miles (21 km) east-southeast of Saint-Brieuc by rail. Lamballe station is served by high speed trains to Brest, Rennes and Paris, and regional trains to Brest, Saint-Brieuc, Dol-de-Bretagne and Rennes.

== History ==
Lamballe was the capital of the territory of the Counts of Penthièvre, who in 1569 were made dukes. La Noue, the famous Huguenot leader, was mortally wounded in 1591 in the siege of the castle, which was dismantled in 1626 by Richelieu. The last Duke of Penthièvre granted his son Louis the title Prince of Lamballe. The Prince de Lamballe married Marie Therese de Savoie-Carignan and she took the title Princesse de Lamballe. The Princess lived with her father-in-law after the early death of her husband. She was a close friend of Queen Marie Antoinette and one of the most famous victims of the French Revolution.

Charles Armand Tuffin, marquis de la Rouërie, hero of the American war of independence, died near Lamballe in 1793. Chilean dictator Augusto Pinochet's ancestor, Guillame Pinochet, was a Lamballe native of Breton descent. He migrated to then-Spanish Chile in the 18th century.

In 1973 Lamballe absorbed four former communes: Maroué, La Poterie, Saint-Aaron and Trégomar. On 1 January 2016 the former commune of Meslin was merged into Lamballe.

== Population ==
The population data in the table below refer to the (delegated) commune of Lamballe proper, in its geography at the given years.

Historical population

Year	Pop.	±% p.a.
1793	3,907	—
1800	4,402	+1.72%
1806	3,873	−2.11%
1821	4,253	+0.63%
1831	4,390	+0.32%
1836	4,396	+0.03%
1841	4,206	−0.88%
1846	4,212	+0.03%
1851	4,187	−0.12%
1856	4,092	−0.46%
1861	4,256	+0.79%
1866	4,151	−0.50%
1872	4,295	+0.57%
1876	4,255	−0.23%
1881	4,515	+1.19%
1886	4,429	−0.38%
1891	4,529	+0.45%

Year	Pop.	±% p.a.
1896	4,531	+0.01%
1901	4,391	−0.63%
1906	4,562	+0.77%
1911	4,528	−0.15%
1921	4,460	−0.15%
1926	4,708	+1.09%
1931	4,775	+0.28%
1936	5,048	+1.12%
1946	5,646	+1.13%
1954	5,641	−0.01%
1962	5,069	−1.33%
1968	5,075	+0.02%
1975	9,330	+9.09%
1982	9,452	+0.19%
1990	9,894	+0.57%
1999	10,563	+0.73%
2022	12,742	+0.82%

Source: EHESS and INSEE

Inhabitants of Lamballe are called lamballais in French.

== Sights ==
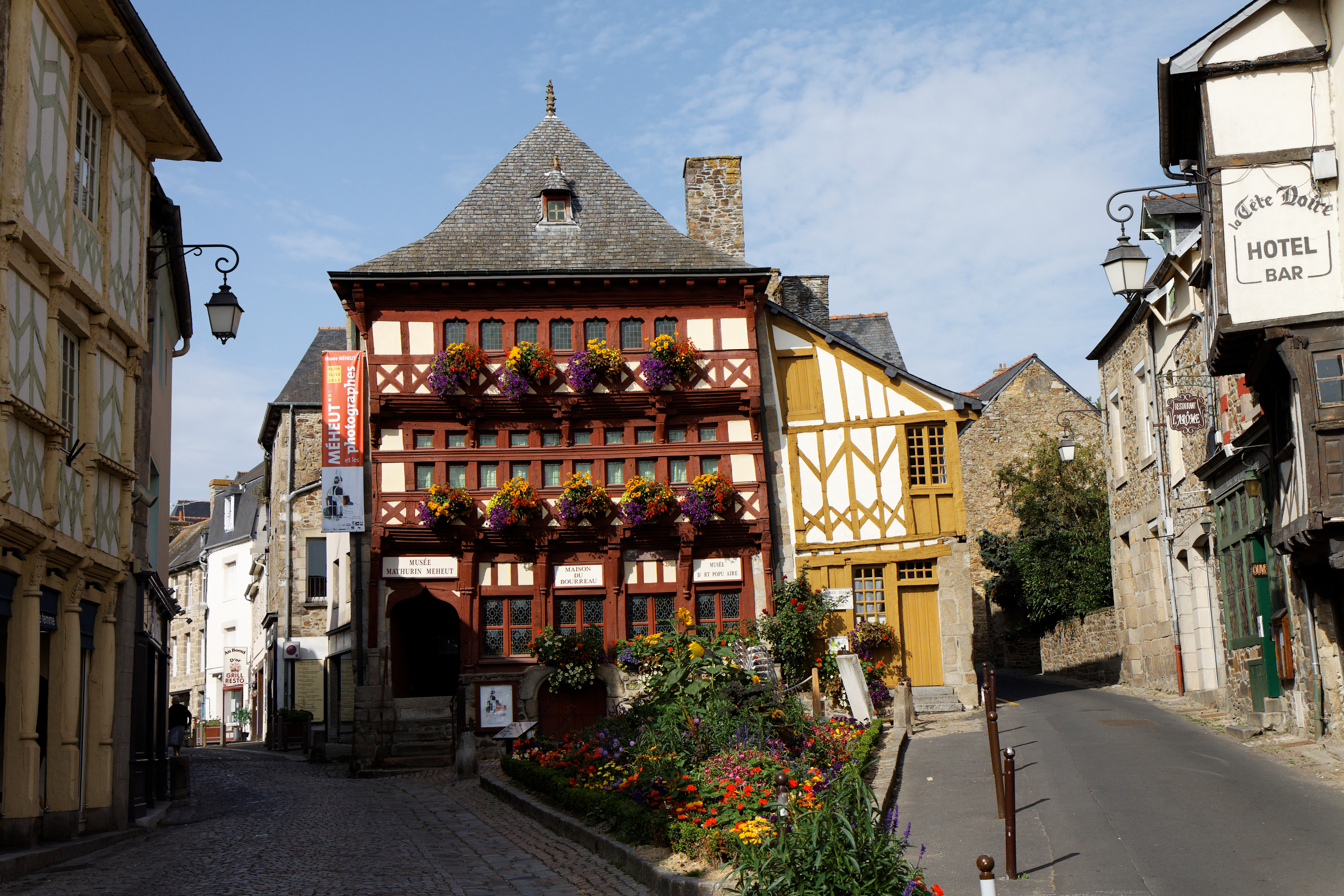
Maison du Bourreau - the Lamballe Museum

Crowning the eminence on which the town is built is a beautiful Gothic church (13th and 14th centuries), once the chapel of the castle of the counts of Penthièvre. Of the other buildings, the church of St Martin (11th, 16th and 16th centuries) is the chief.

== Economy ==
Lamballe has an important stud farm, called Haras National de Lamballe, and in the past carried on trade in grain, tanning and leather-dressing; earthenware was manufactured in the environs.

The town also hosts a weekly market on Thursday mornings, selling locally made produce and meats.

Lamballe is twinned with Oliveira do Bairro, Portugal

== See also ==
- Communes of the Côtes-d'Armor department
- Élie Le Goff Sculptor of Lamballe war memorial
