= Ruca, Côtes-d'Armor =

Ruca Ruskad
- Commune
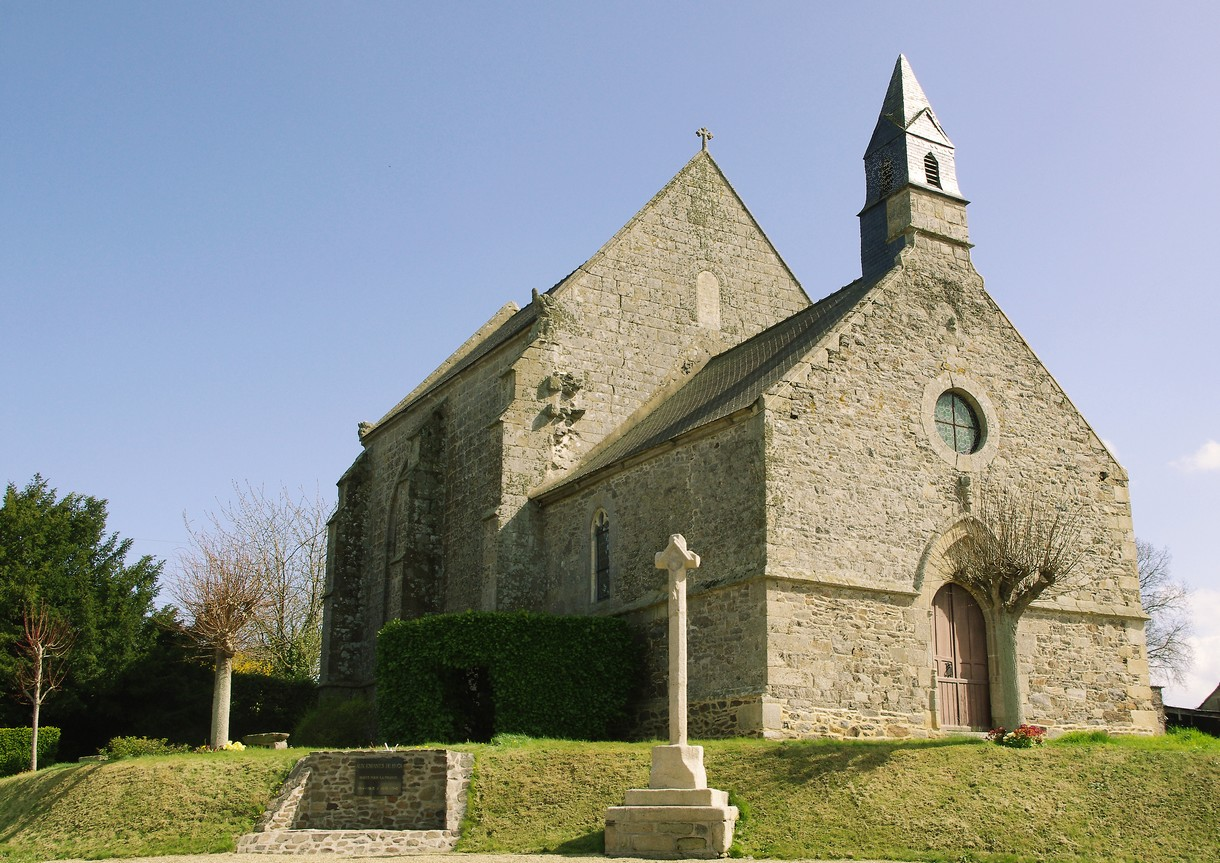
- The chapel of Ruca in 2012
- Location of Ruca
- Location within France Location within Brittany
- Coordinates: 48°34′05″N 2°20′17″W
- Country: France
- Region: Brittany
- Department: Côtes-d'Armor
- Arrondissement: Dinan
- Canton: Pléneuf-Val-André
- Intercommunality: Dinan Agglomération

Government
  - Mayor (2020–2026): Dominique Perche
- Area^{1}: 12.13 km^{2} (4.68 sq mi)
- Elevation: 45 m (148 ft)
- Highest elevation: 79 m (259 ft)
- Lowest elevation: 22 m (72 ft)
- Population (2023): 595
  - Density: 49.1/km^{2} (127/sq mi)
- Time zone: UTC+01:00 (CET)
  - Summer (DST): UTC+02:00 (CEST)
- INSEE/Postal code: 22268 /22550
- ^{1} French Land Register data, which excludes lakes, ponds, glaciers > 1 km^{2} (0.386 sq mi or 247 acres) and river estuaries.

Ruca (French pronunciation: [ʁyka]; Breton: Ruskad) is a commune in the Côtes-d'Armor department in Brittany in northwestern France.

== Population ==
Historical population
Year	Pop.	±% p.a.
1968	637	—
1975	582	−1.28%
1982	578	−0.10%
1990	544	−0.75%
1999	504	−0.84%
2007	499	−0.12%
2012	586	+3.27%
2017	609	+0.77%
2023	595	−0.39%
Source: INSEE

Inhabitants of Ruca are called rucassiens in French.

== See also ==
- Communes of the Côtes-d'Armor department
