= Lamballe-Armor =

Lamballe-Armor Lambal-Arvor (Breton)
- Commune
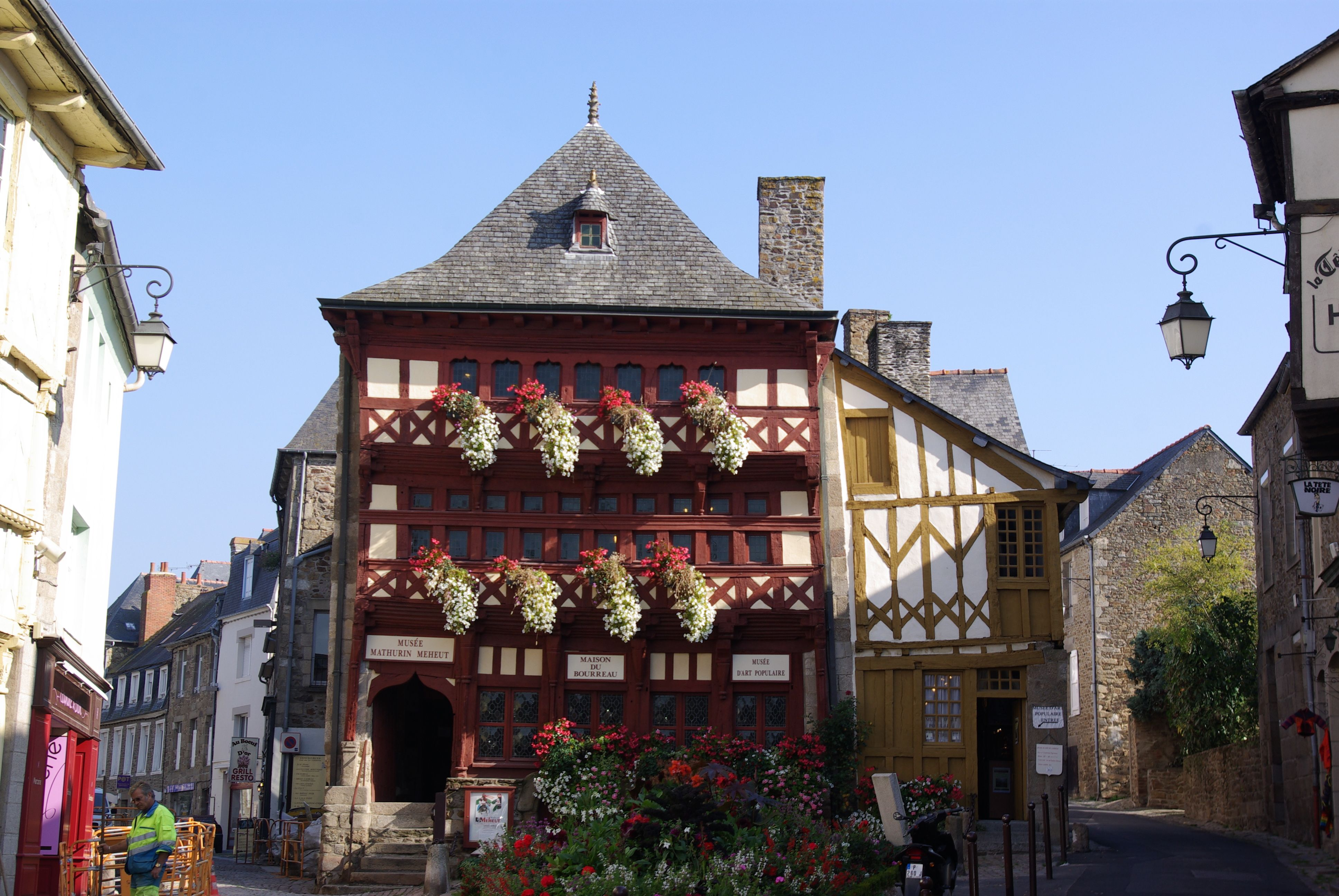
- The Lamballe Museum
- Location of Lamballe-Armor
- Location within France Location within Brittany
- Coordinates: 48°28′10″N 2°31′00″W
- Country: France
- Region: Brittany
- Department: Côtes-d'Armor
- Arrondissement: Saint-Brieuc
- Canton: Lamballe-Armor and Pléneuf-Val-André
- Intercommunality: CA Lamballe Terre et Mer

Government
  - Mayor (2020–2026): Philippe Hercouët
- Area^{1}: 130.65 km^{2} (50.44 sq mi)
- Highest elevation: 131 m (430 ft)
- Lowest elevation: 0 m (0 ft)
- Population (2023): 17,241
  - Density: 131.96/km^{2} (341.78/sq mi)
- Time zone: UTC+01:00 (CET)
  - Summer (DST): UTC+02:00 (CEST)
- INSEE/Postal code: 22093 /22400
- ^{1} French Land Register data, which excludes lakes, ponds, glaciers > 1 km^{2} (0.386 sq mi or 247 acres) and river estuaries.

Lamballe-Armor (French pronunciation: [lɑ̃bal aʁmɔʁ]; Breton: Lambal-Arvor) is a commune in the Côtes-d'Armor department in Brittany in northwestern France. It was established on 1 January 2019 by merger of the former communes of Lamballe (the seat), Morieux and Planguenoual.

== Population ==
Historical population
Year	Pop.	±% p.a.
1968	11,638	—
1975	11,799	+0.20%
1982	12,195	+0.47%
1990	12,732	+0.54%
1999	13,578	+0.72%
2007	14,782	+1.07%
2012	16,405	+2.11%
2017	16,578	+0.21%
2023	17,241	+0.66%
Populations of the area corresponding with the commune of Lamballe-Armor at 1 January 2025. Source: INSEE
