= Matignon, Côtes-d'Armor =

Matignon Matignon
- Commune
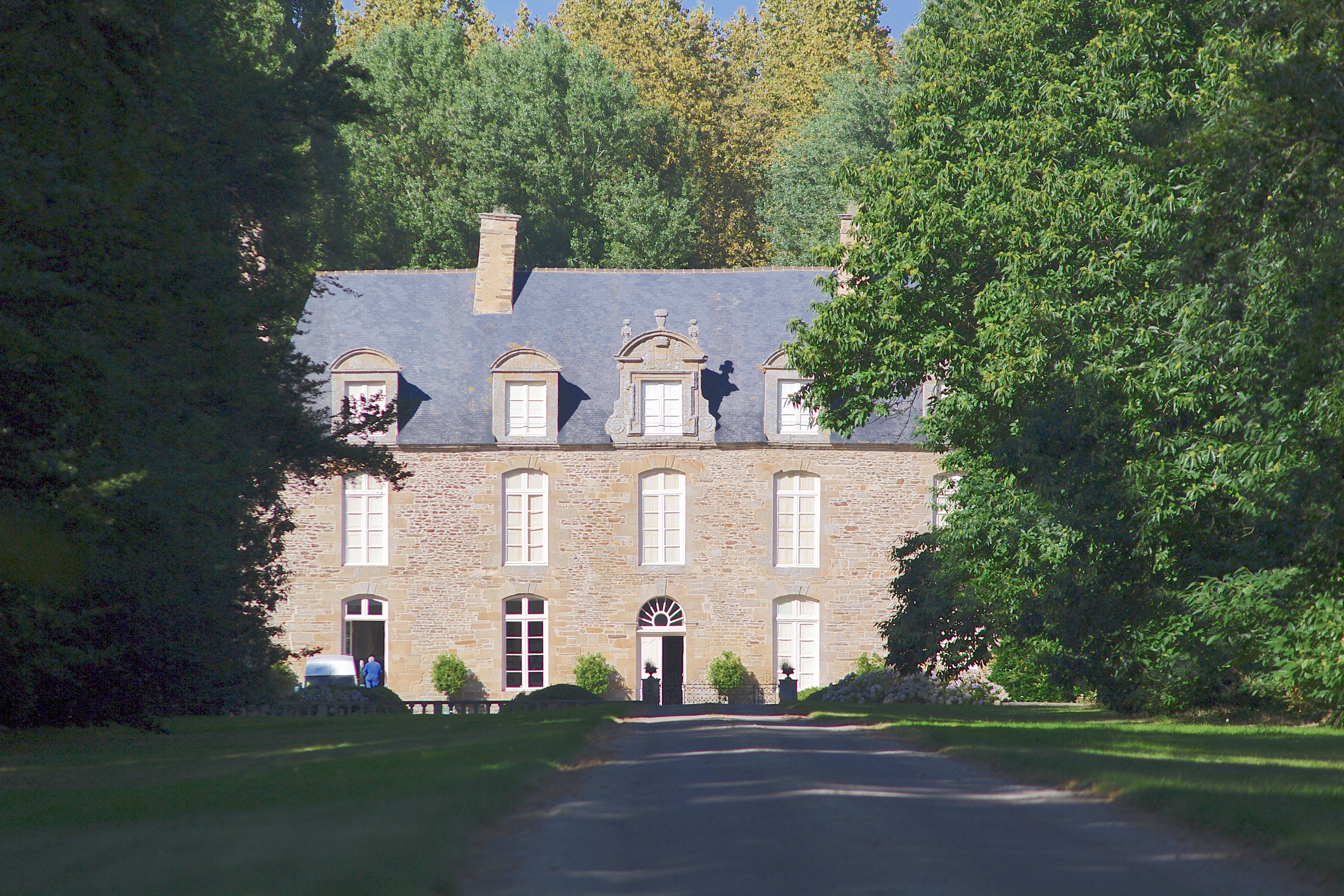
- Manor house of Chesnaye-Taniot

- Coat of arms
- Location of Matignon
- Location within France Location within Brittany
- Coordinates: 48°35′48″N 2°17′26″W
- Country: France
- Region: Brittany
- Department: Côtes-d'Armor
- Arrondissement: Dinan
- Canton: Pléneuf-Val-André
- Intercommunality: Dinan Agglomération

Government
  - Mayor (2020–2026): Jean-René Carfantan
- Area^{1}: 14.53 km^{2} (5.61 sq mi)
- Highest elevation: 76 m (249 ft)
- Lowest elevation: 0 m (0 ft)
- Population (2023): 1,771
  - Density: 121.9/km^{2} (315.7/sq mi)
- Time zone: UTC+01:00 (CET)
  - Summer (DST): UTC+02:00 (CEST)
- INSEE/Postal code: 22143 /22550
- ^{1} French Land Register data, which excludes lakes, ponds, glaciers > 1 km^{2} (0.386 sq mi or 247 acres) and river estuaries.

Matignon (French pronunciation: [matiɲɔ̃]; Breton: Matignon; Gallo: Mateinyon) is a commune in the Côtes-d'Armor department of Brittany in northwestern France.

== Population ==
Historical population
Year	Pop.	±% p.a.
1968	1,417	—
1975	1,591	+1.67%
1982	1,609	+0.16%
1990	1,613	+0.03%
1999	1,537	−0.53%
2007	1,560	+0.19%
2012	1,650	+1.13%
2017	1,662	+0.15%
2023	1,771	+1.06%
Source: INSEE

Inhabitants of Matignon are called matignonnais in French.

== See also ==
- Communes of the Côtes-d'Armor department
