= Ruca (footballer, born January 1990) =

Portuguese footballer

Personal information
- Full name: Rui Pedro Correia Nunes
- Date of birth: 7 January 1990 (age 36)
- Place of birth: Tábua, Portugal
- Height: 1.85 m (6 ft 1 in)
- Position: Goalkeeper

Youth career
- 1998–2000: Tabuense
- 2000–2001: Tourizense
- 2001–2002: Vila do Mato
- 2002–2003: Tourizense
- 2003–2009: Porto
- 2005–2006: → Padroense (loan)

Senior career*
Years	Team	Apps	(Gls)
2009–2012	Marítimo B	9	(0)
2010–2011	→ Tourizense (loan)	20	(0)
2012–2015	Nogueirense	42	(0)
2015–2016	Académico Viseu	4	(0)
2016–2021	Lusitano Vildemoinhos	128	(0)
2021–2022	Oliveira Hospital	6	(0)
2022	Castro Daire	5	(0)
Total		214	(0)
- * Club domestic league appearances and goals

Rui Pedro Correia Nunes (born 7 January 1990), known as Ruca, is a Portuguese former professional footballer who played as a goalkeeper.

== Club career ==
Born in Tábua, Coimbra District, Ruca all but spent his entire senior career in the Portuguese lower leagues. In early February 2015, he signed a five-month contract with Segunda Liga club Académico de Viseu F.C. from A.D. Nogueirense, making his debut in the competition on 15 April in a 0–0 home draw against FC Porto B.

Ruca returned to the third division in the summer of 2016, joining Lusitano FCV in the same region.
