= Vasyl Ponikarov =

Soviet-Ukrainian artist

- Василь Андрійович Понікаров
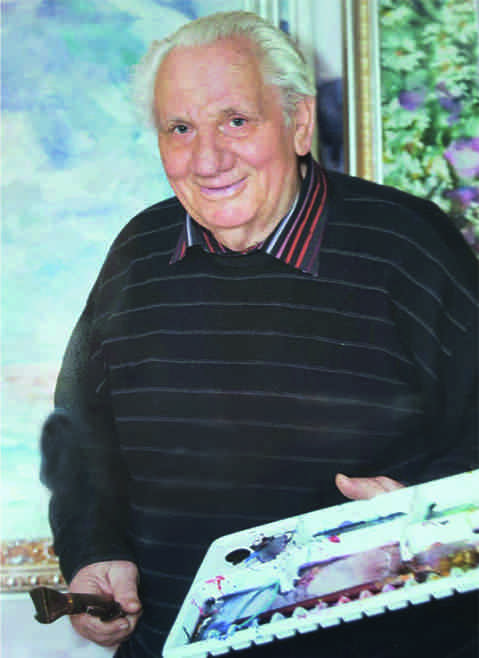
- Born: Vasily Ponikarov; 26 August 1929; Dolynske, Odesa Oblast, UkrSSR, USSR
- Died: 16 May 2014 (aged 84); Odesa, Ukraine
- Other names: Vassili Ponikarov, Vasily Ponikarov, Vasiliy Ponikarov
- Education: Grekov Odesa Art school, Moscow State University of Printing Arts
- Known for: Graphics, still life, landscape painting, portrait
- Awards: Honoured Artist of Ukraine

Signature
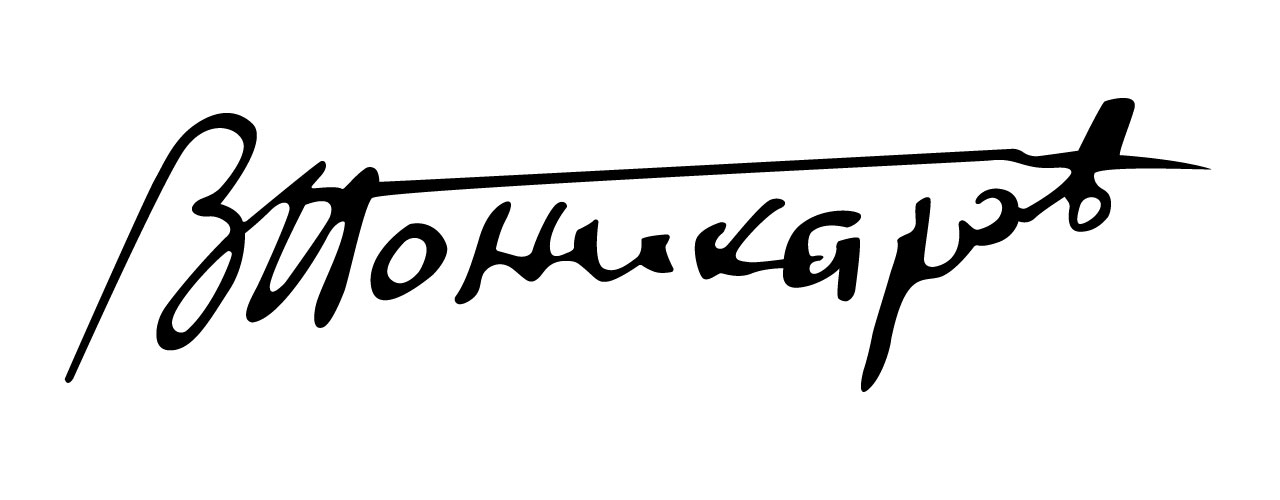

Vasyl Ponikarov (Ukrainian: Василь Андрійович Понікаров; Russian: Василий Андреевич Поникаров; 26 August 1929 – 16 May 2014) was a Soviet and Ukrainian artist, member of the National Union of Artists of Ukraine (1971).

== Biography ==
Vasyl Ponikarov was born on 26 August 1929 in the village Dolynske of Ananiv Raion of Odesa Oblast (Ukraine). His childhood coincided with the years of the Second World War. After seven years of schooling, he left his native village. After the end of the war Vasyl continued his studies firstly in the A.S. Makarenko Tiraspol Pedagogical College (1947–1948), lately in the M.B. Grekov Odesa Art school (1949–1958).

In the Art school his pedagogues were M.Y. Zhuk, L.O. Muchnyk, L.O. Tokareva-Aleksandrovych. Leonid Ovsiiovych Muchnyk while getting acquainted with the works of Vasyl advised him: "You should to paint in watercolor. As I think, it's yours".
Ponikarov was called up for military service after the first course in the Art school. He was doing his military service in Yevpatoria. The military base where Vasyl was in the service appreciated a talent of young artist by entrusting to his charge all visual agitation (leaflets, placards). His gift and high appreciation of his effort as an artist culminated in increase of a duration of military service. Vasyl Ponikarov served longer than needed – three and one half years instead of three years. After the demobilisation Vasyl continued his studies within the walls of the same Art school in Odesa .

Three years after graduation from the Art school Vasyl Ponikarov becomes a student of Moscow Polygraphic Institute (1961–1970). Over this years his pedagogues were Y.K. Burdzhelyan, B.A. Sholokhov, G.T. Goroshchenko. Entering of Vasyl into the Artists' Union of the USSR (1971) was recommended by K.M. Lomykin, M.A. Sheliuto, A.L. Yakovlev who remarked considerable growth of mastery of the artist after graduation from the Institute. Background of Vasyl Ponikarov already consisted of art works that had been exposed in all of the USSR.

From 1980 onwards Vasyl Ponikarov painted on journeys on the ocean liner "Fedor Shalyapin", where he served as a staff artist. Like so, the paintings were made, those on which the artist pictured what he saw in Italy, France, Spain, Turkey, Egypt, and Germany.

== Works ==
Landscape painting and still life were genres Ponikarov gave preference to. He painted using the wet-on-wet technique in watercolor on the premoistened paper that deprived dabs of paint of hardness. The artist painted in transparent watercolor, he didn't combine watercolor with other techniques and precluded the use of white paint (titanium dioxide PW6 or zinc oxide PW4) to obtain white color. White color is unpainted paper.

Many of Ponikarov landscape paintings pictured Odesa and its environs since almost all his life was connected with this region. Examples of those works: «Arcadia» (1984), «In Odesa Courtyard» (1984), «Winter on the Big Fountain» (1986), «Odesa. Proletarian boulevard» (1986), «Ilyichyovsk. Lighthouse» (1986). However, Vasyl created a good many of his watercolor paintings on his journeys across Soviet republics and abroad: «Dombay» (1972), «Karelian pines» (1975), «Lake in Sedniv» (1980), «Caucasian birches» (1981), «Rozluch. Carpathians» (1983), «Holosiivo. Ponds» (1984), «Vylkovo» (1987). On journeys that served him as a source of new impressions artworks cycles like «Ancient monuments», «Channel Dnepr-Donbass», «Pushkin reserve», «In Gurzuf» were painted. Cycles of art works painted abroad contain images of Paris, Rome, London, Prague, Barcelona, Budapest, Istanbul, Jerusalem and Cairo.

In landscape painting the artist was evoking motifs of southern Ukraine – juicy, mature vegetables and fruits, vivid flowers. Watercolors of flowers united in series brought him great success. As a "King of flowers and emperor of sunflowers" a fine art expert from Alexandria M. Sheryf named Vasyl. Vasyl Andriiovych worked often on floral compositions by moving up images to the frames of pictures, by approaching images as much as possible to spectators. He pictured flowers in contourless sketchy manner that makes possible to reproduce flowering, rustle, smell.

As a rule, Vasyl Ponikarov worked on location finishing a watercolor painting in one session. Often he turned to work without planning it in advance. For example, departing somewhere on his car, Vasyl could pull up in the middle of the flowering field and turn to paint. Vasyl Andriiovych by creating several sheets a day for a half of century of his creative activity pictured tens of thousands of artworks that dispersed around the world. Ponikarov in Iryna Tymokhova (a fine art expert) opinion is one of the most productive artists. In this regard on the pages of news paper "Vechirnia Odesa" Iryna Tymokhova compared the artist with I.K. Aivazovsky.

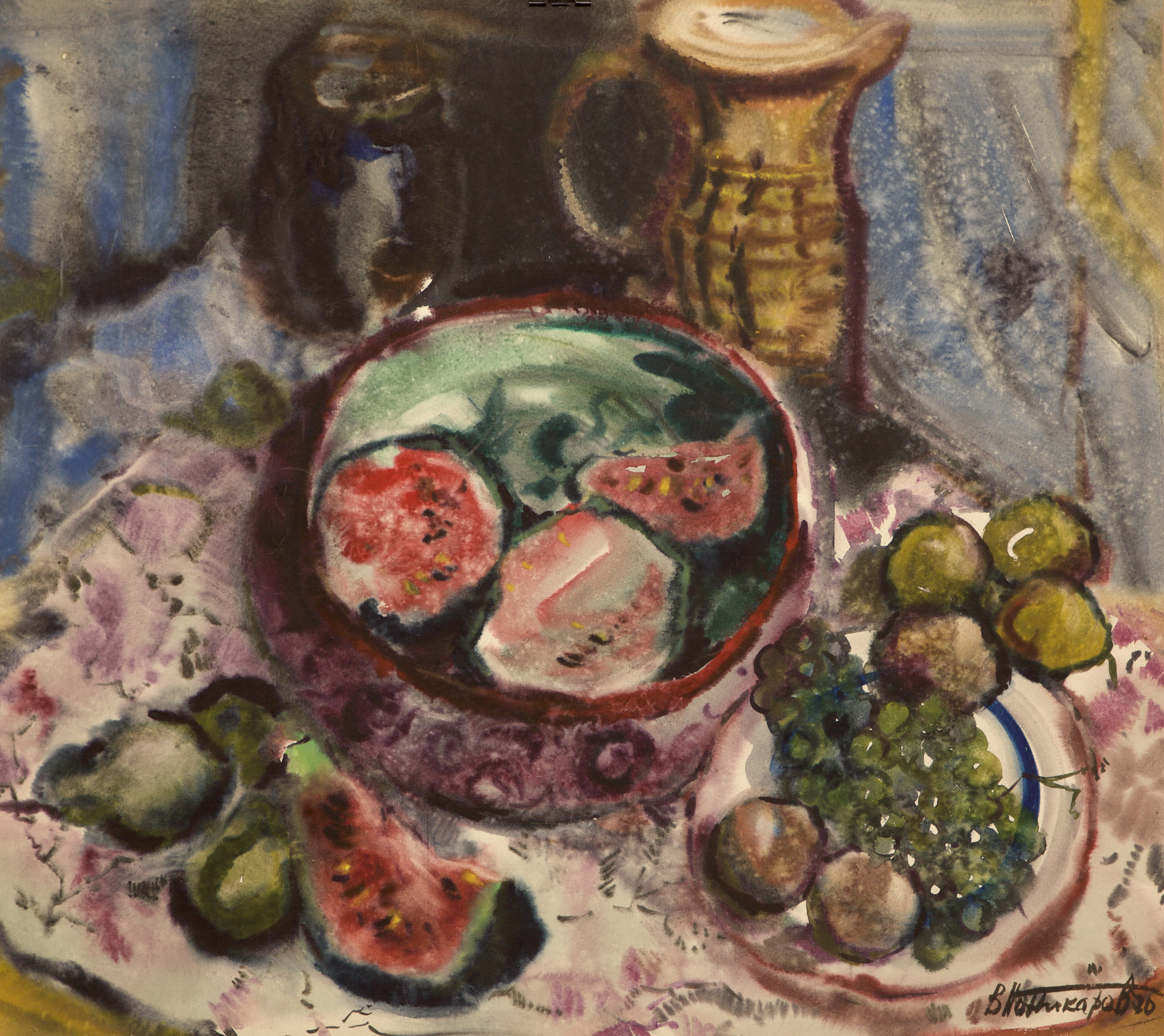
"Watermelons, grape, pears", (75.5х68, 1970)

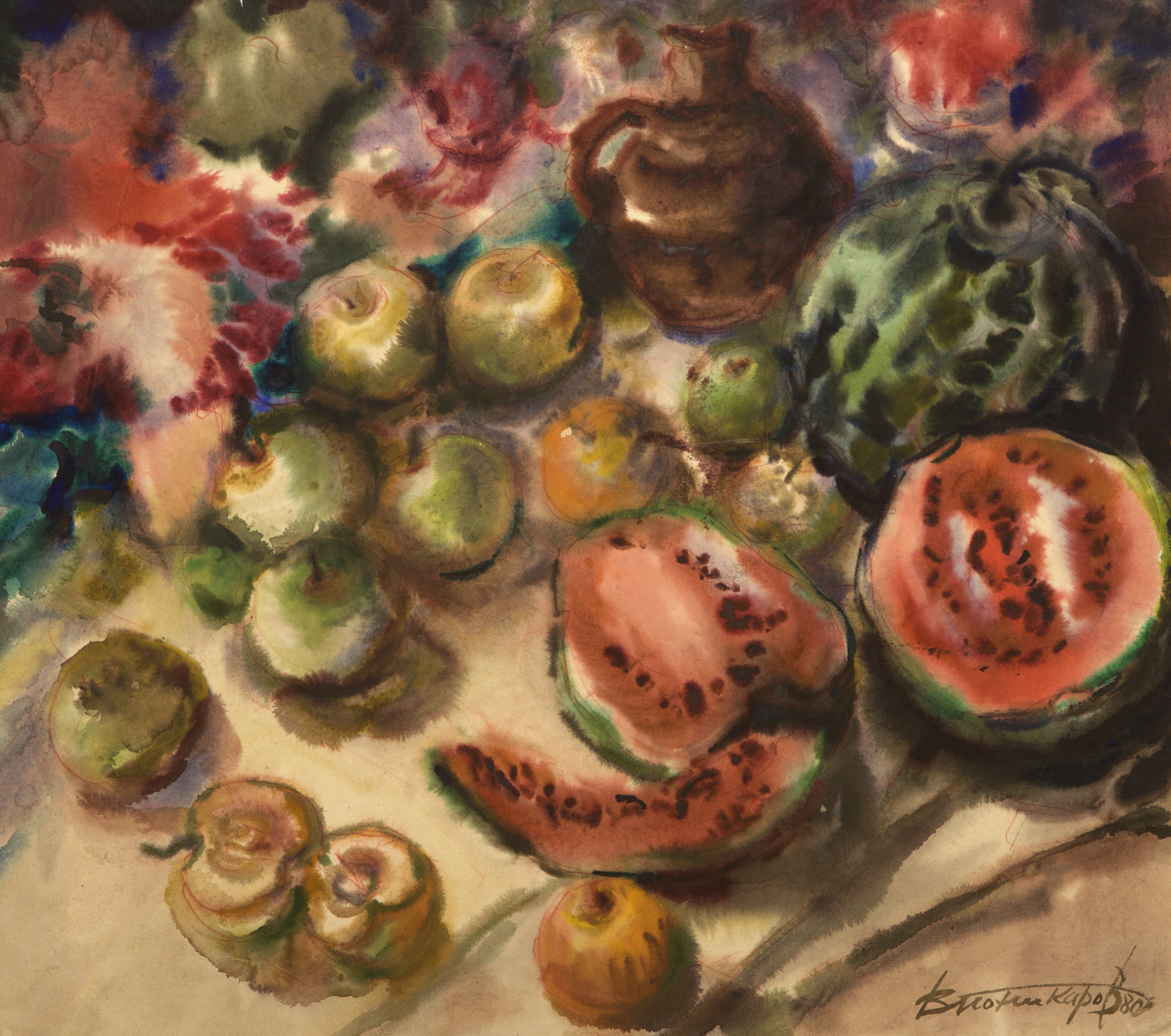
"Watermelons, fruits", (68х61.5, 1980)

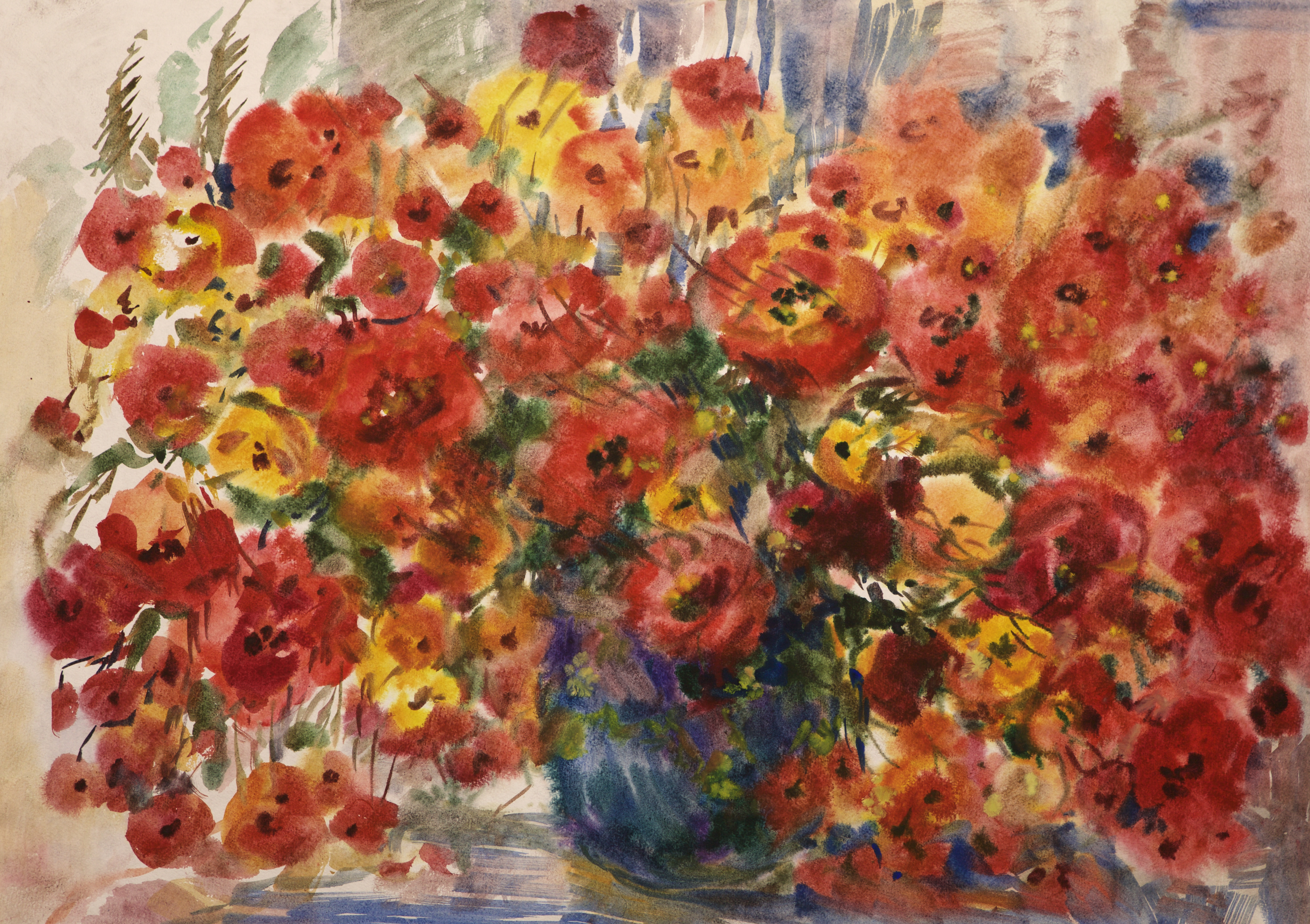
"Bouquet, poppies", (86х60.5, 2000)

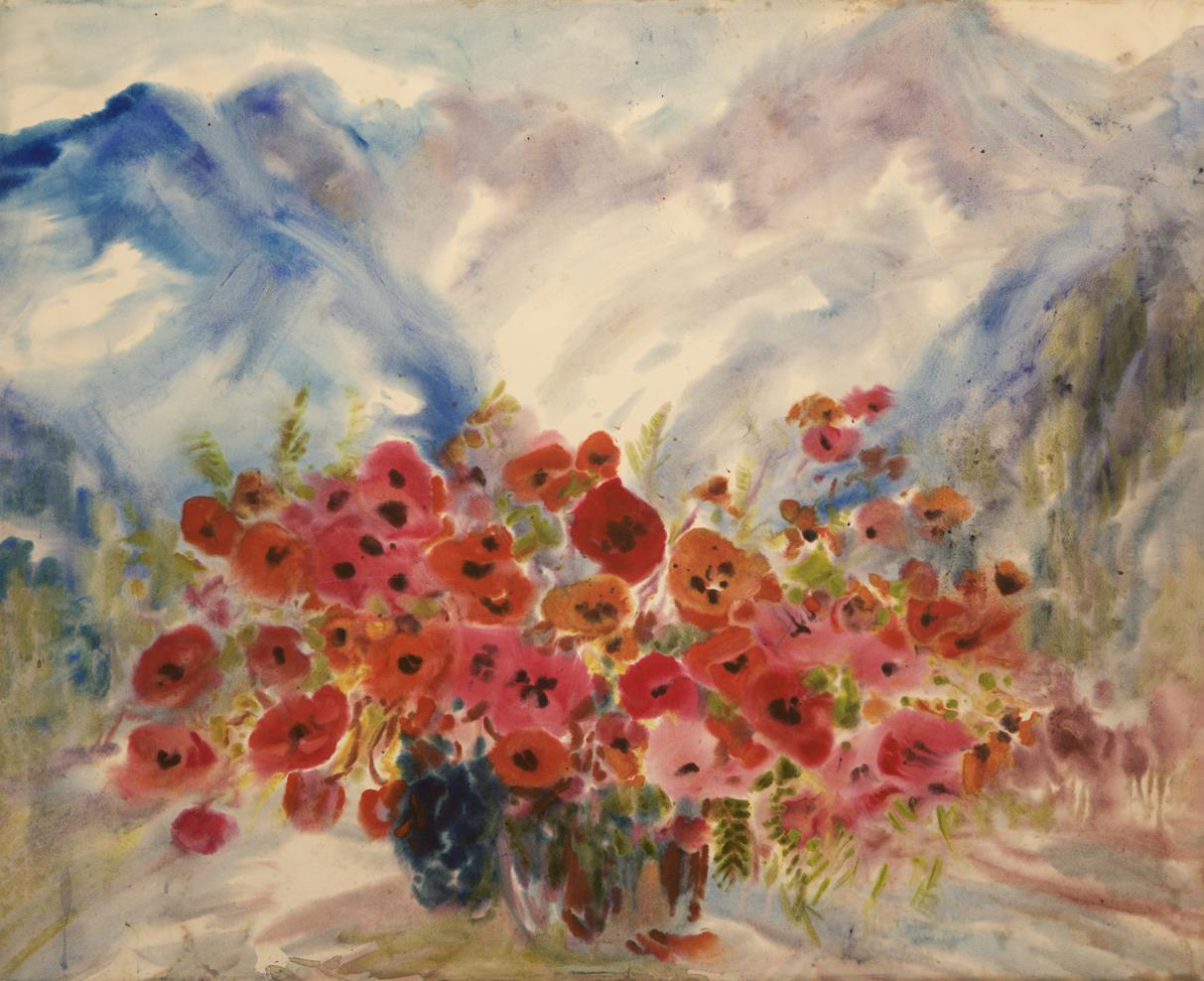
"Bouquet, poppies, blue mountains", (111.5х90, 1995)

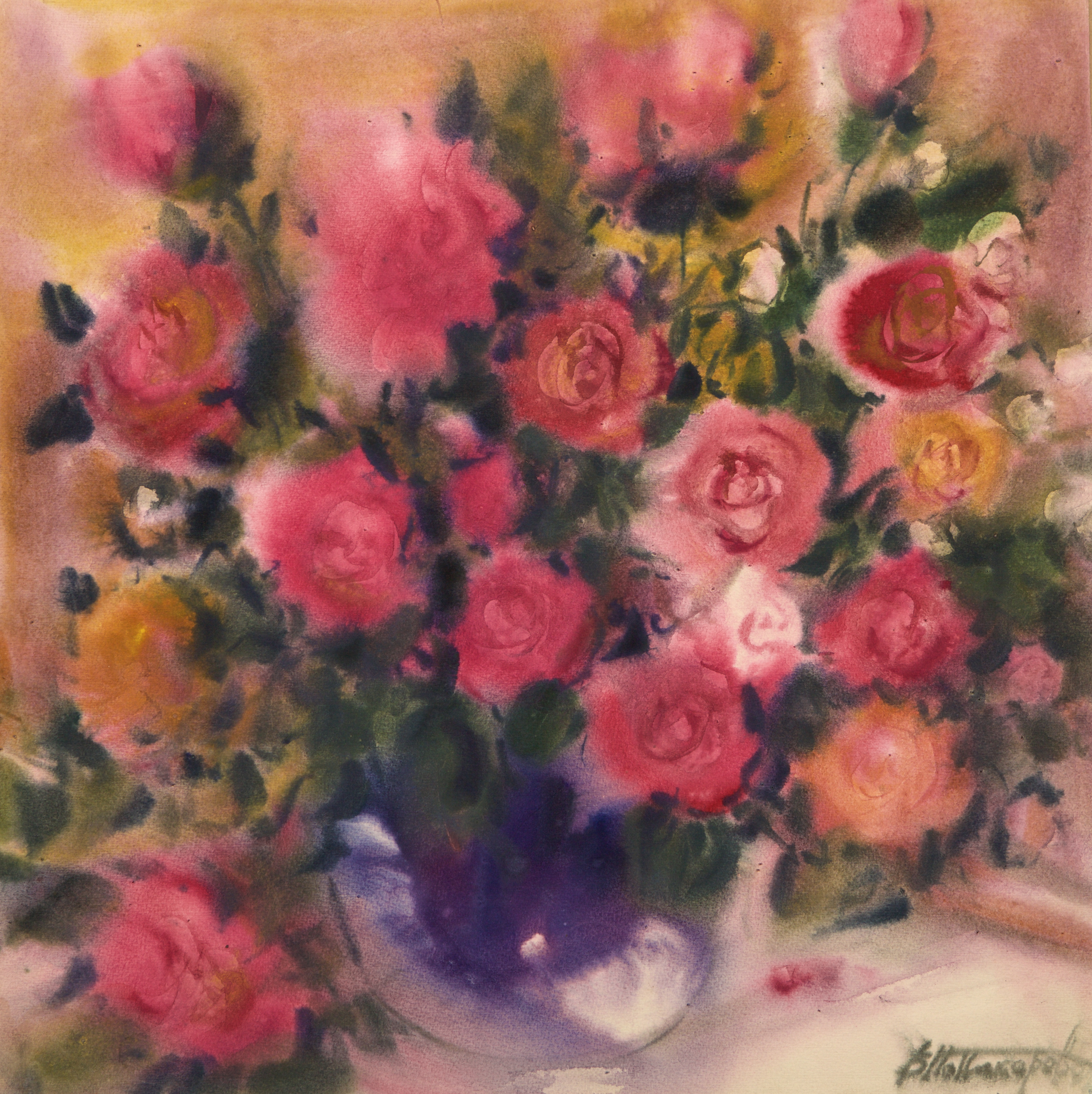
"Bouquet, roses", (60x60, 1993)

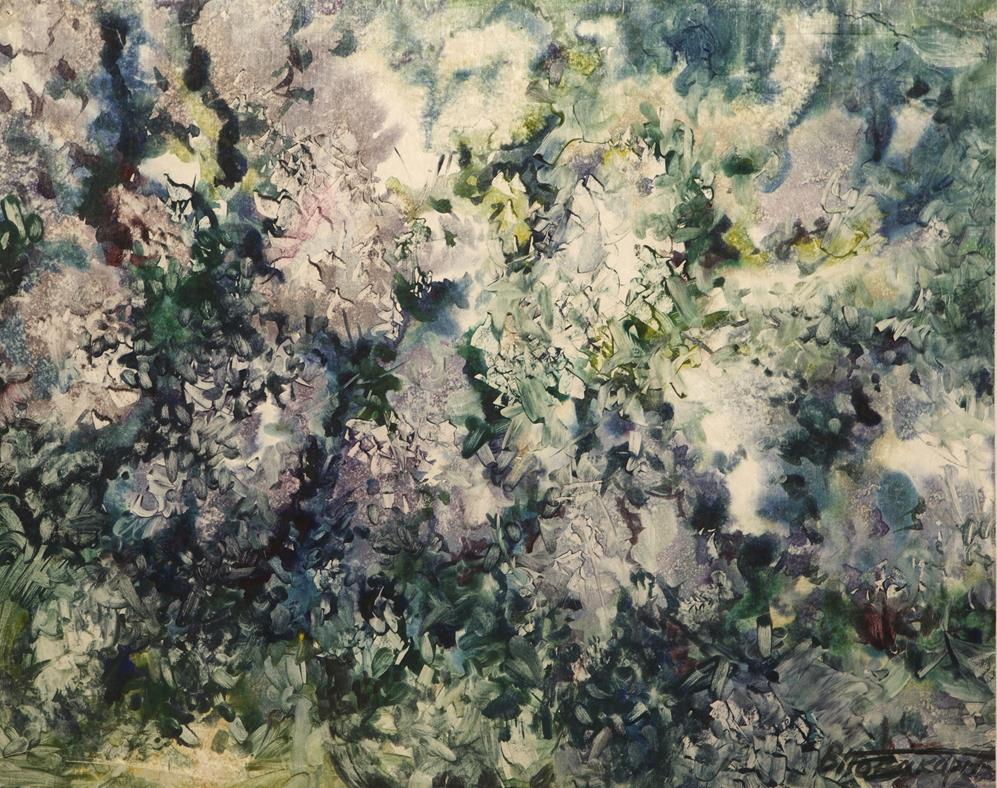
"Bouquet, lilac", (65х53, 2000)

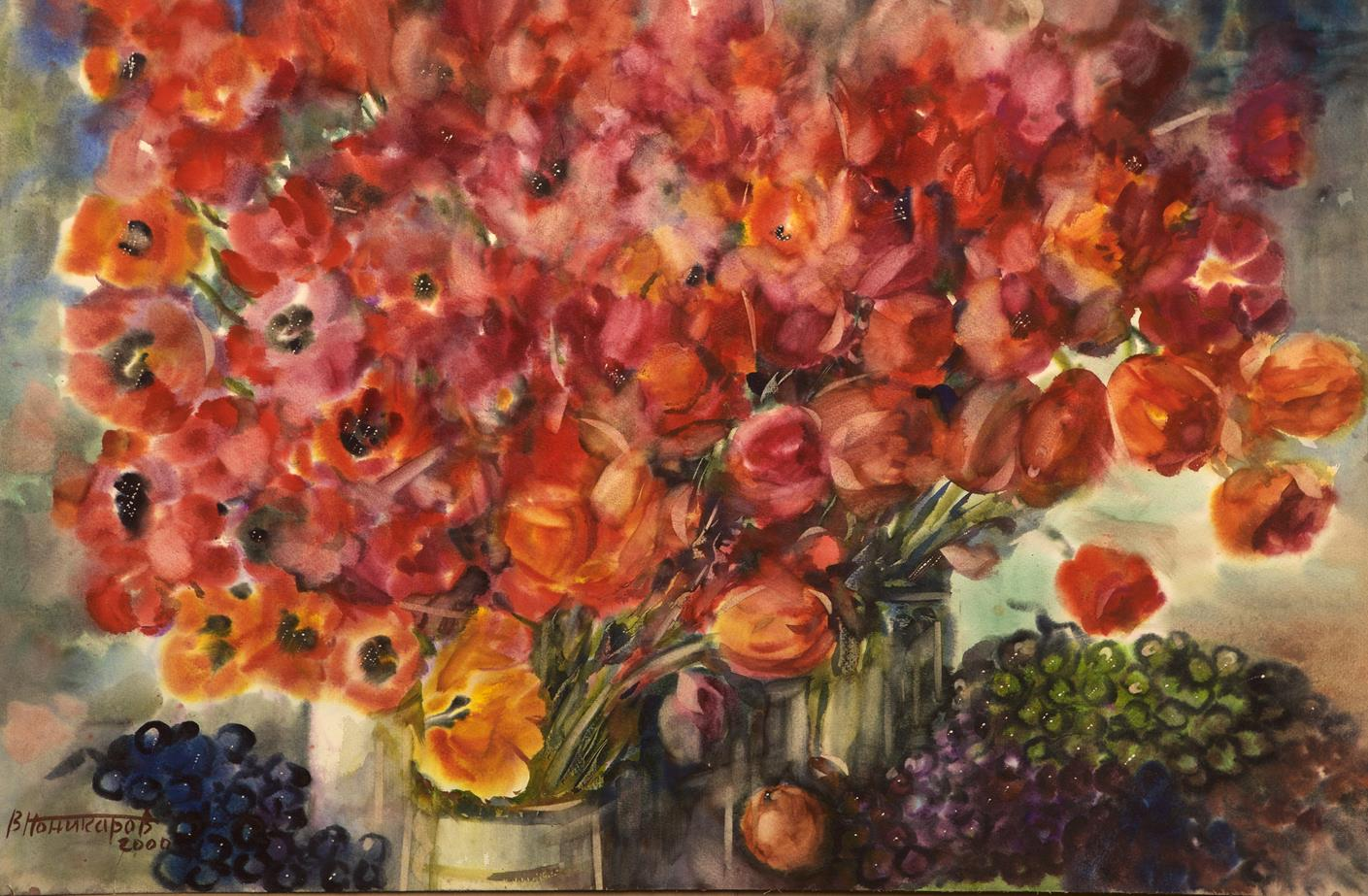
"Bouquet, tulips, poppies, grape", (100х65.5, 2000)

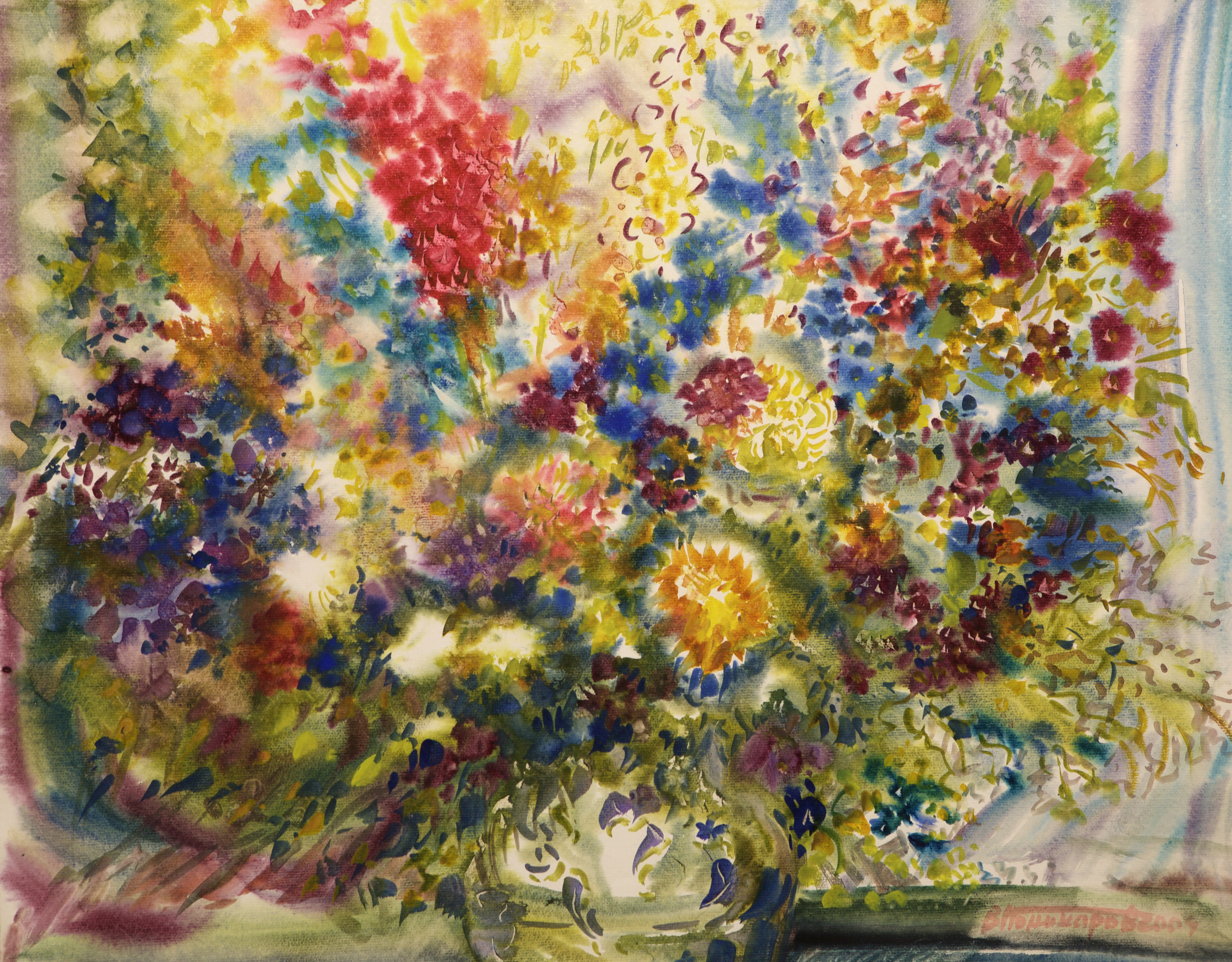
"Bouquet, flowers", (81х65, 2004)

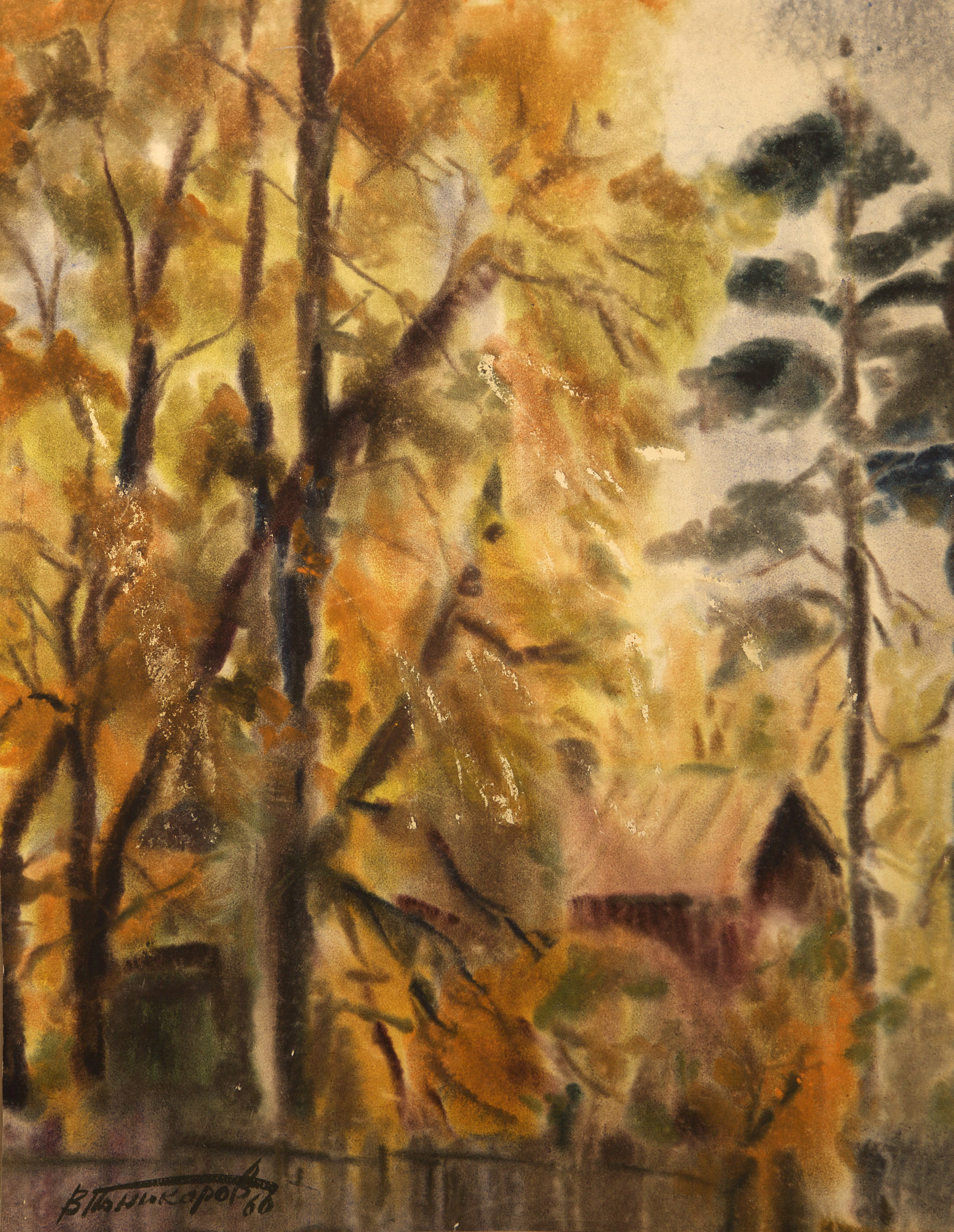
"Tree, autumn", (52×69.5, 1960)

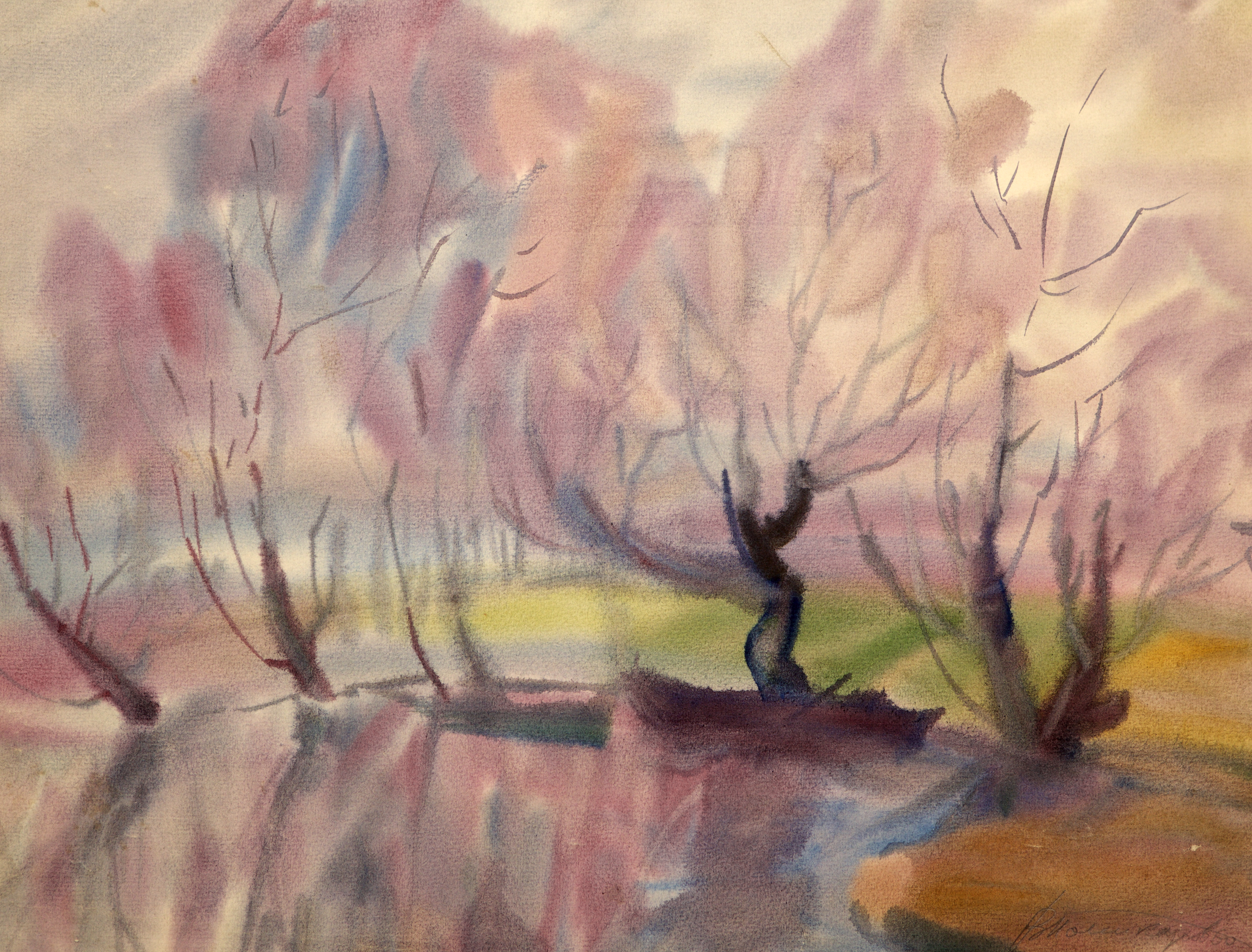
"Trees, lack", (47.5×36, 1960)

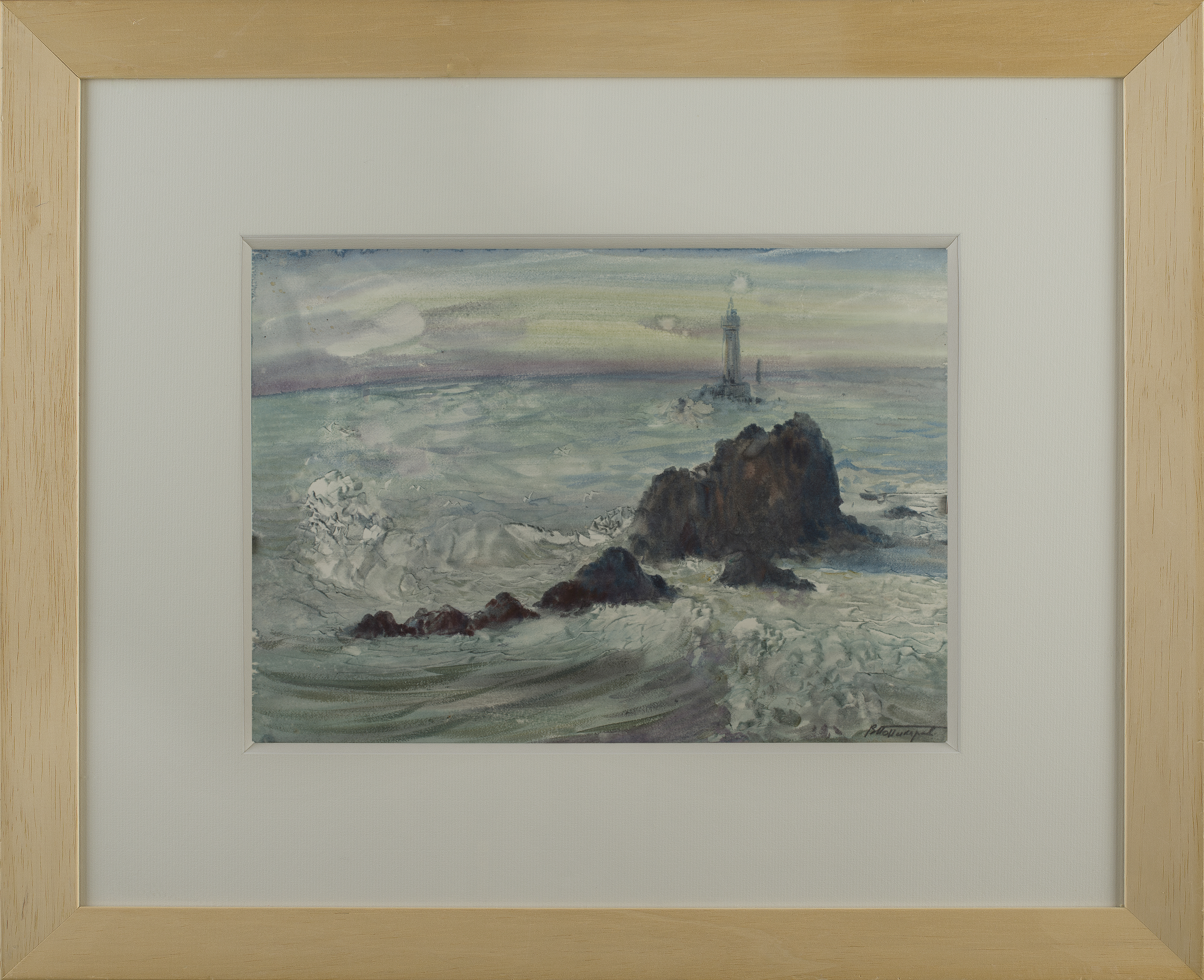
"Brittany"

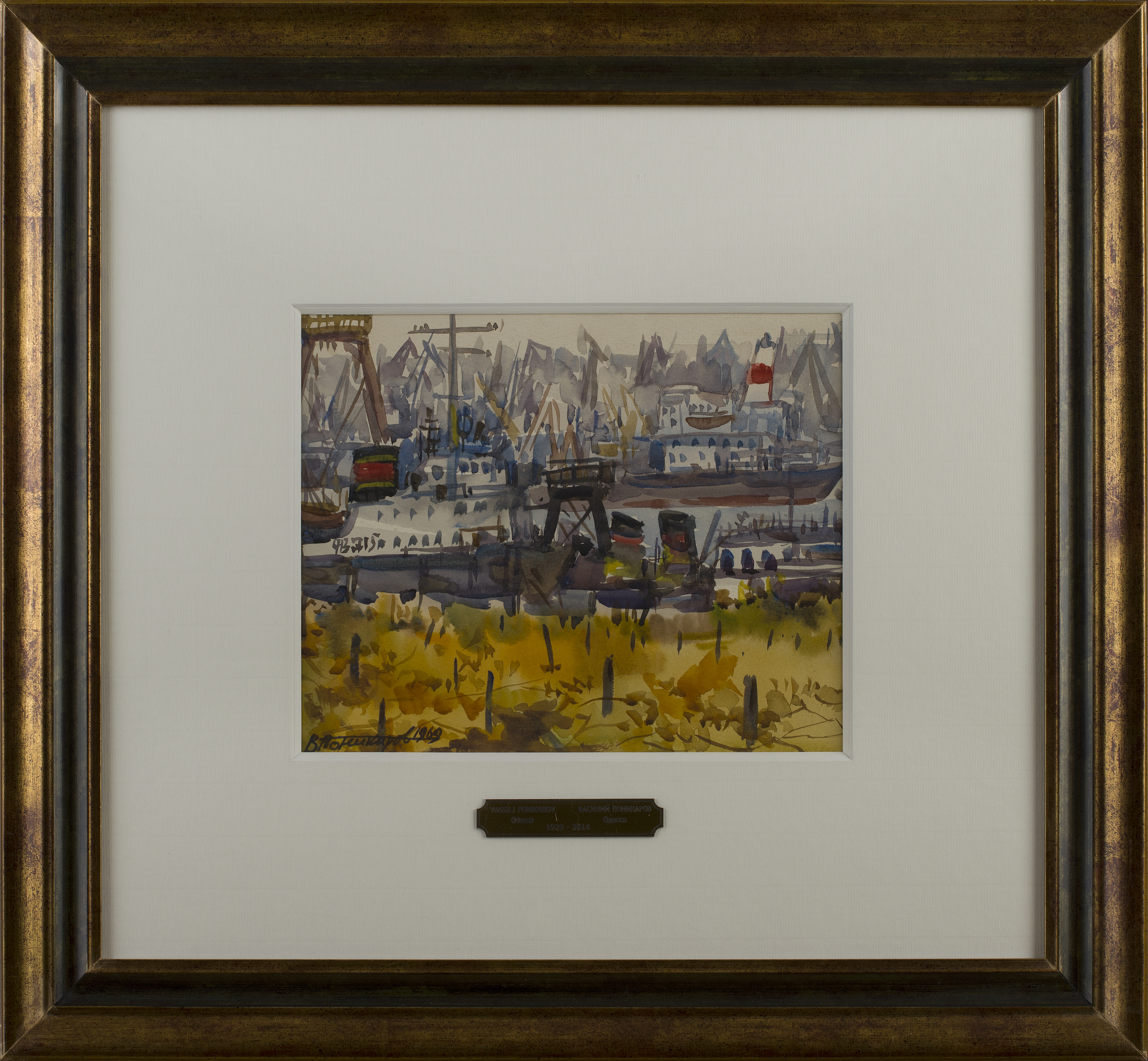
"Port of Ilyichevsk", (1969)

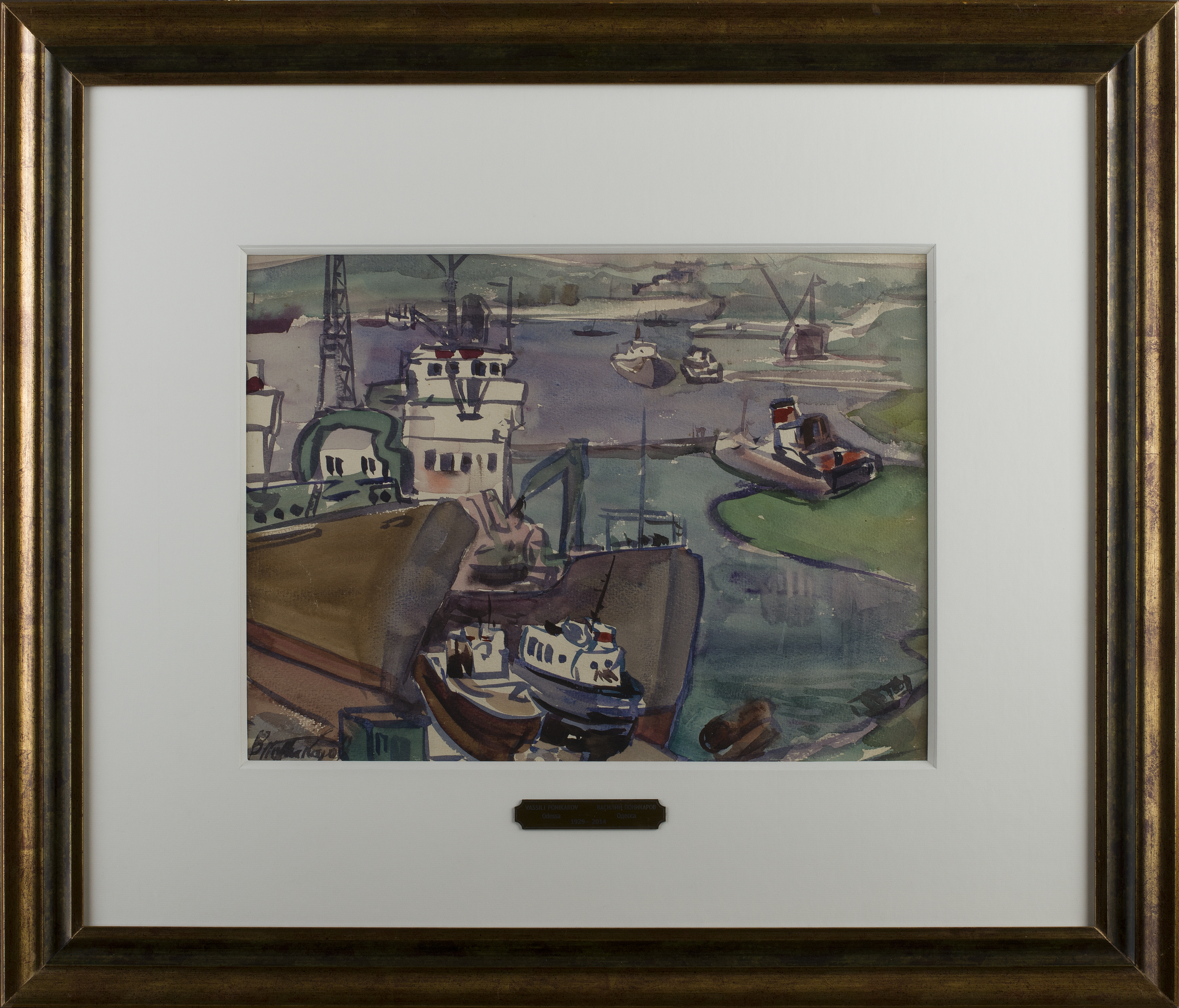
"Port of Ilyichevsk"

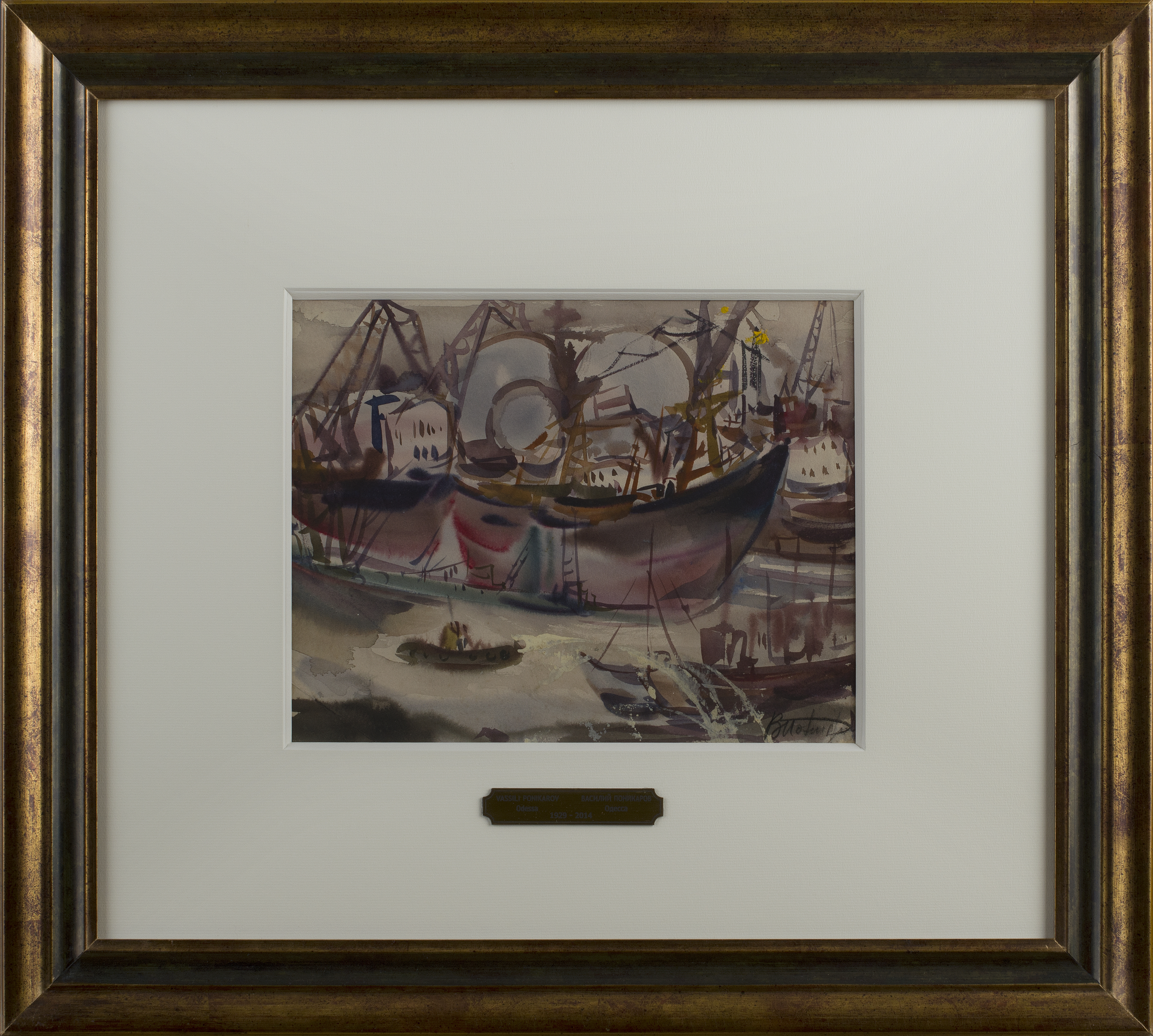
"Port of Ilyichevsk, ships"

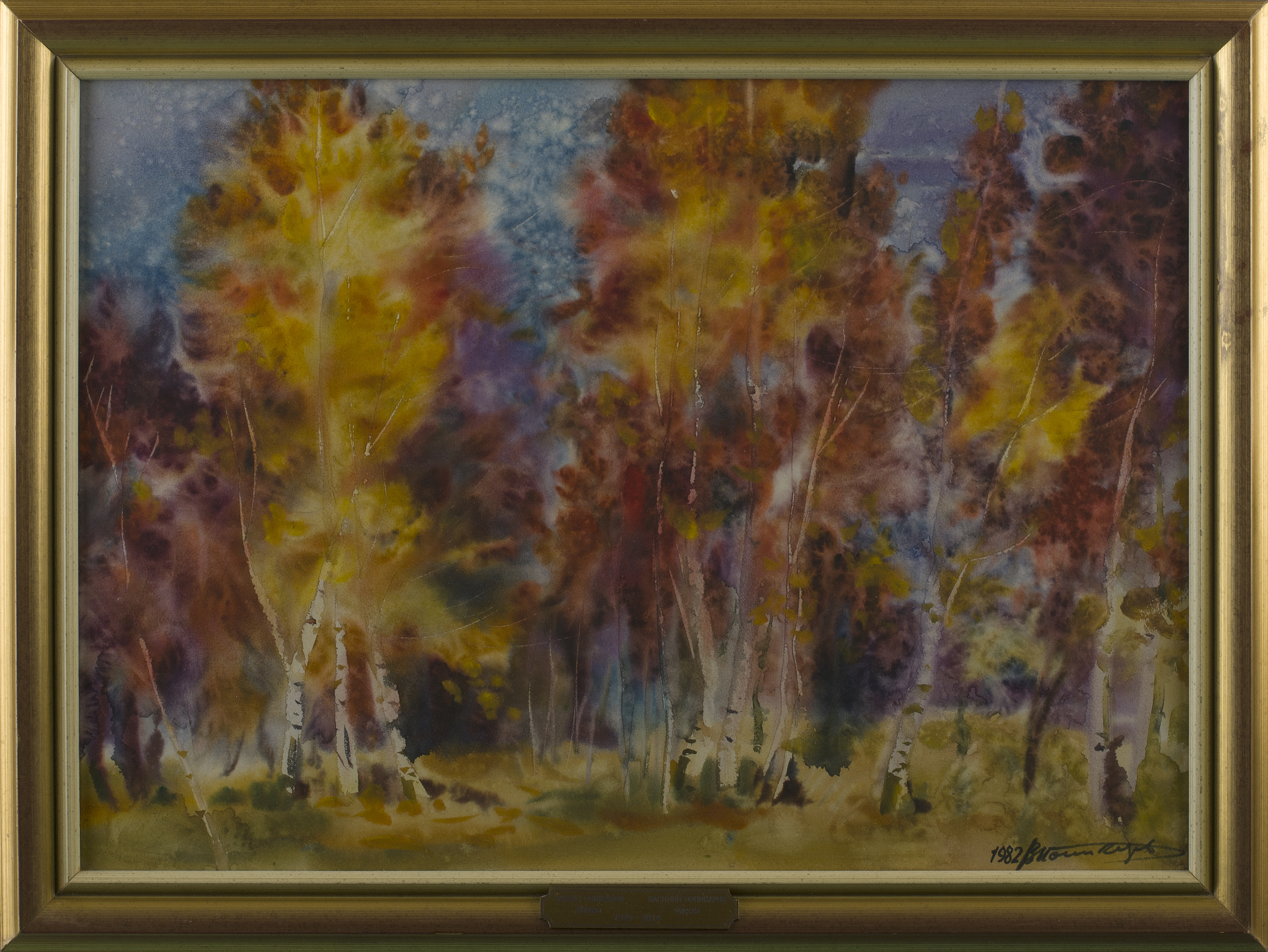
"Forest", (1982)

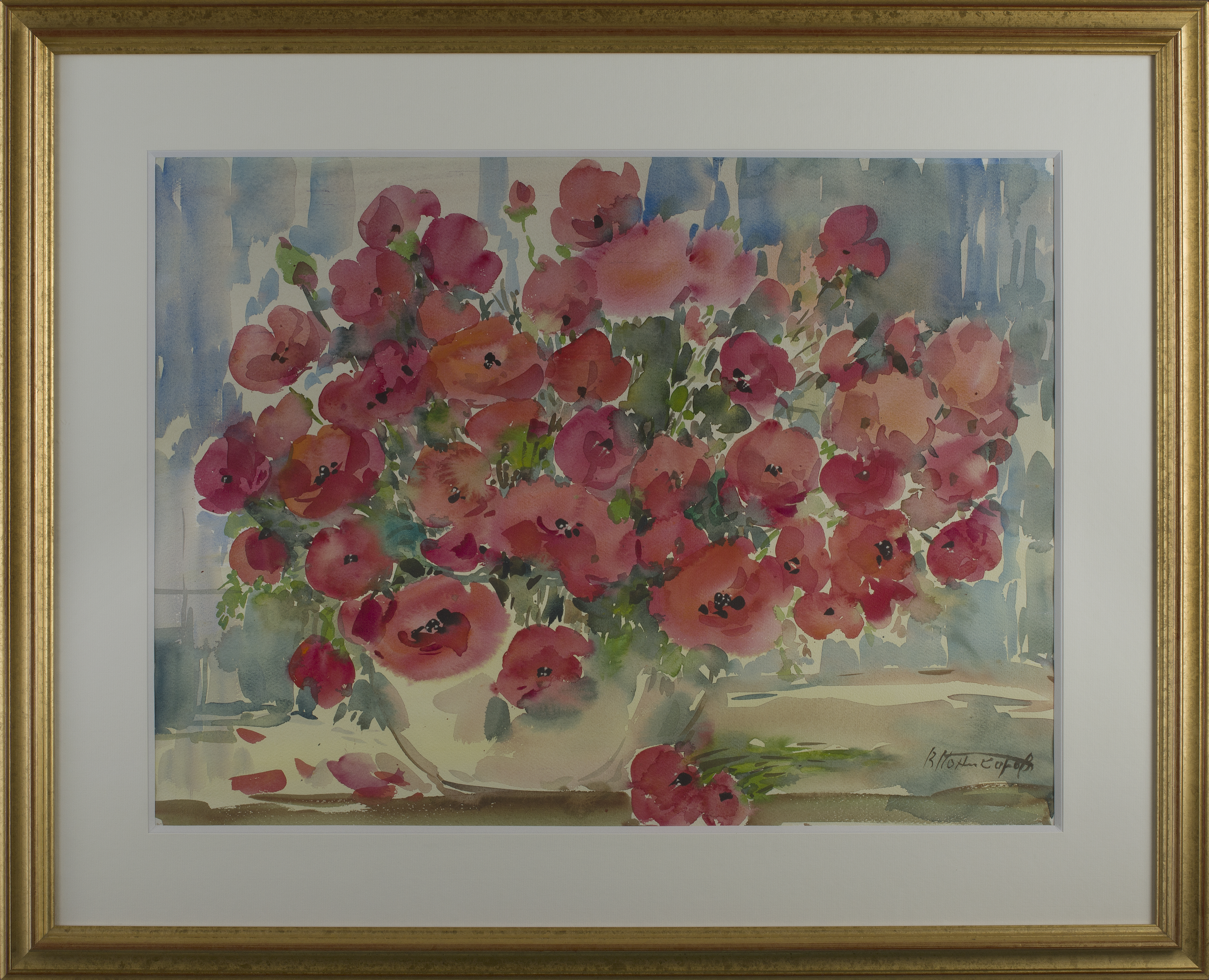
"Poppies"

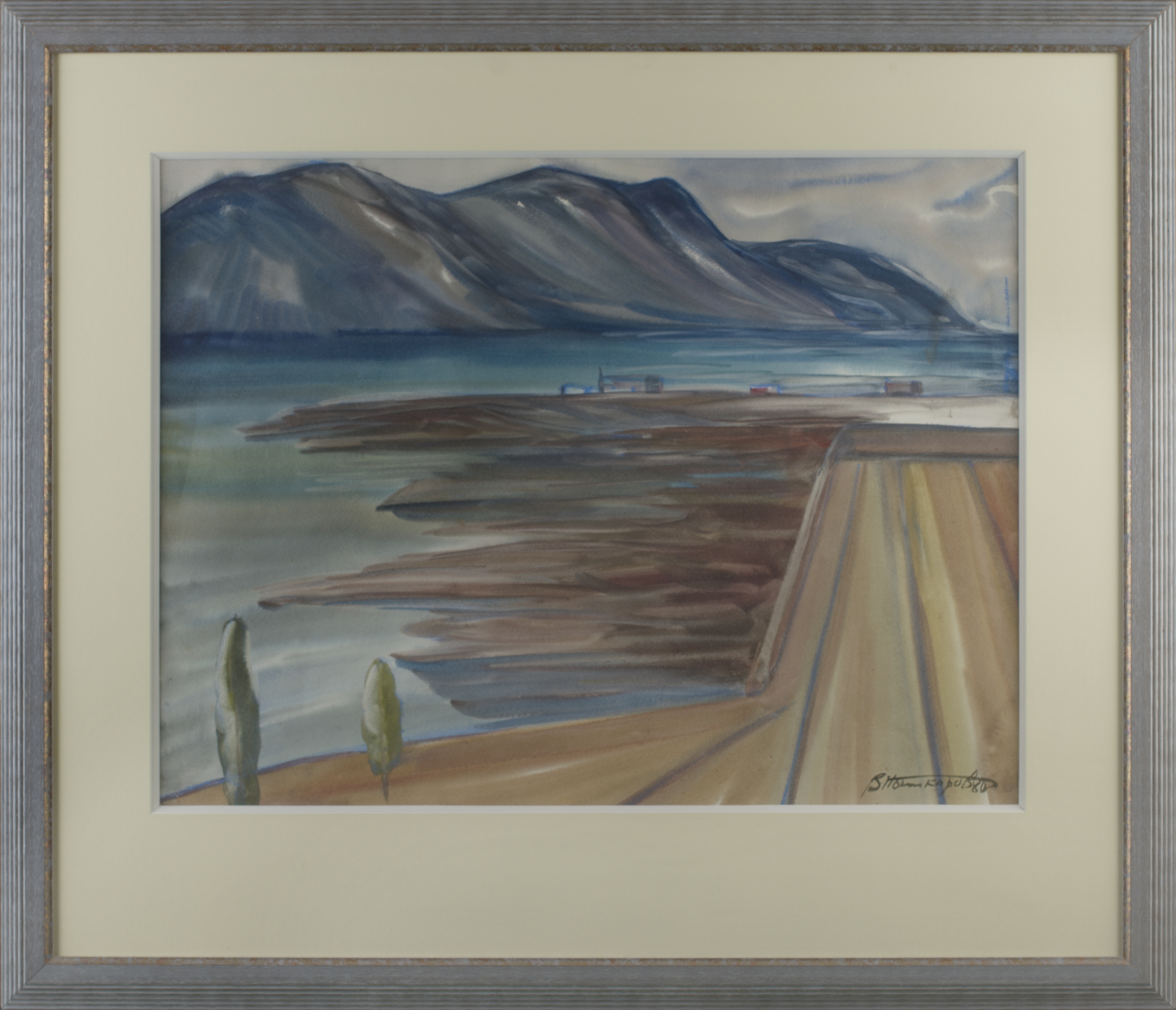
"Seascape", (1980)

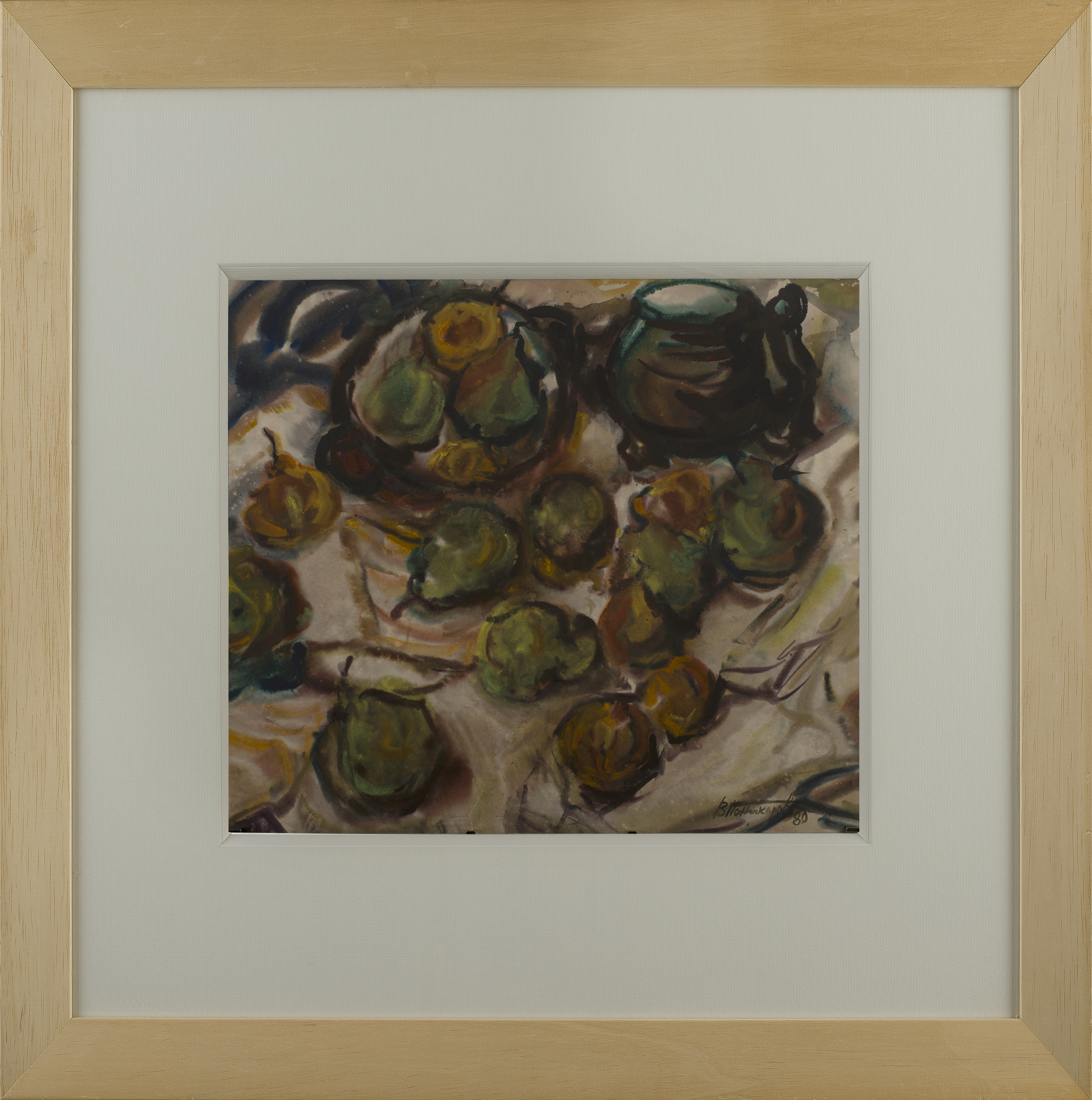
"Still life", (1980)

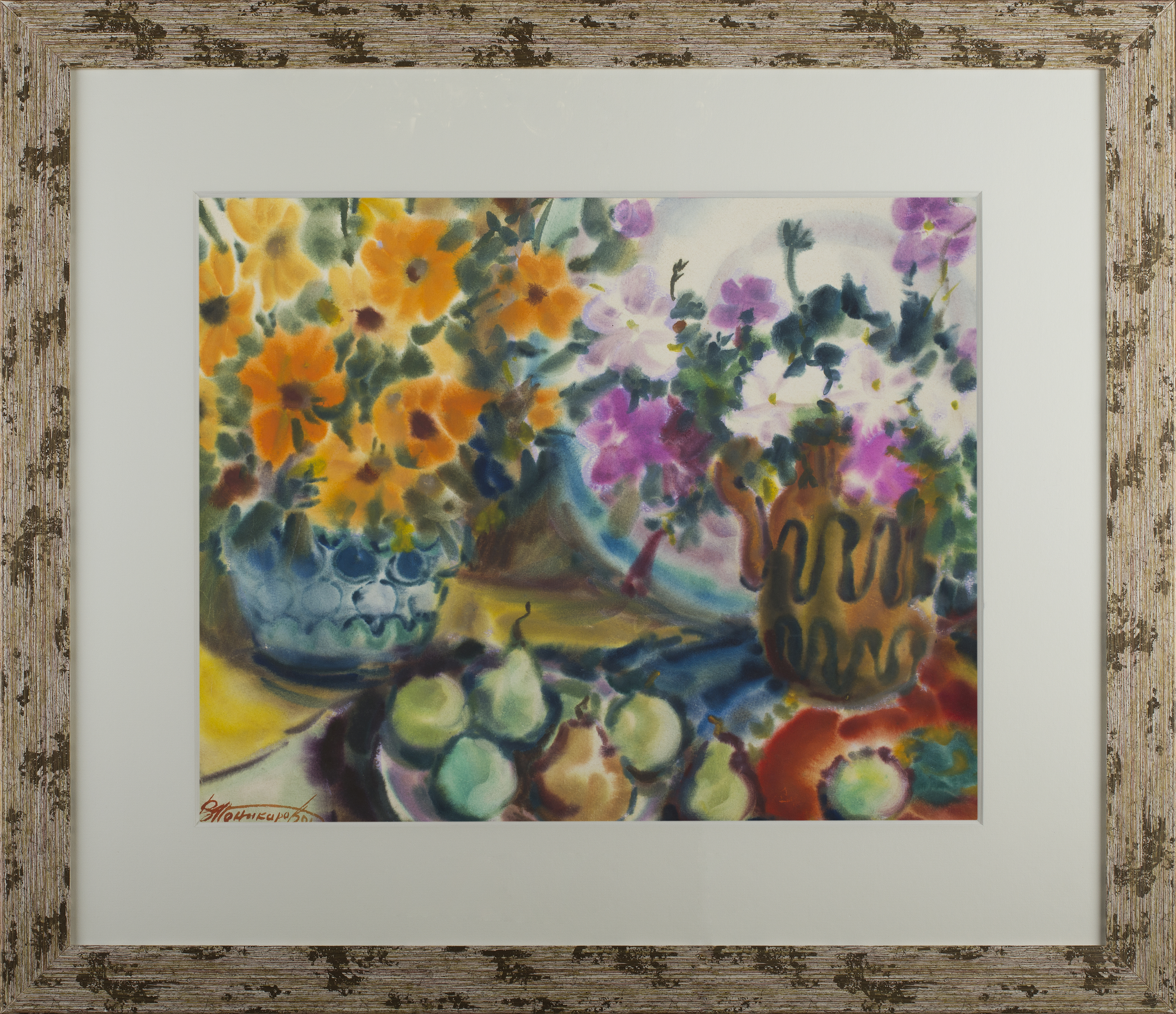
"Still life", (1991)

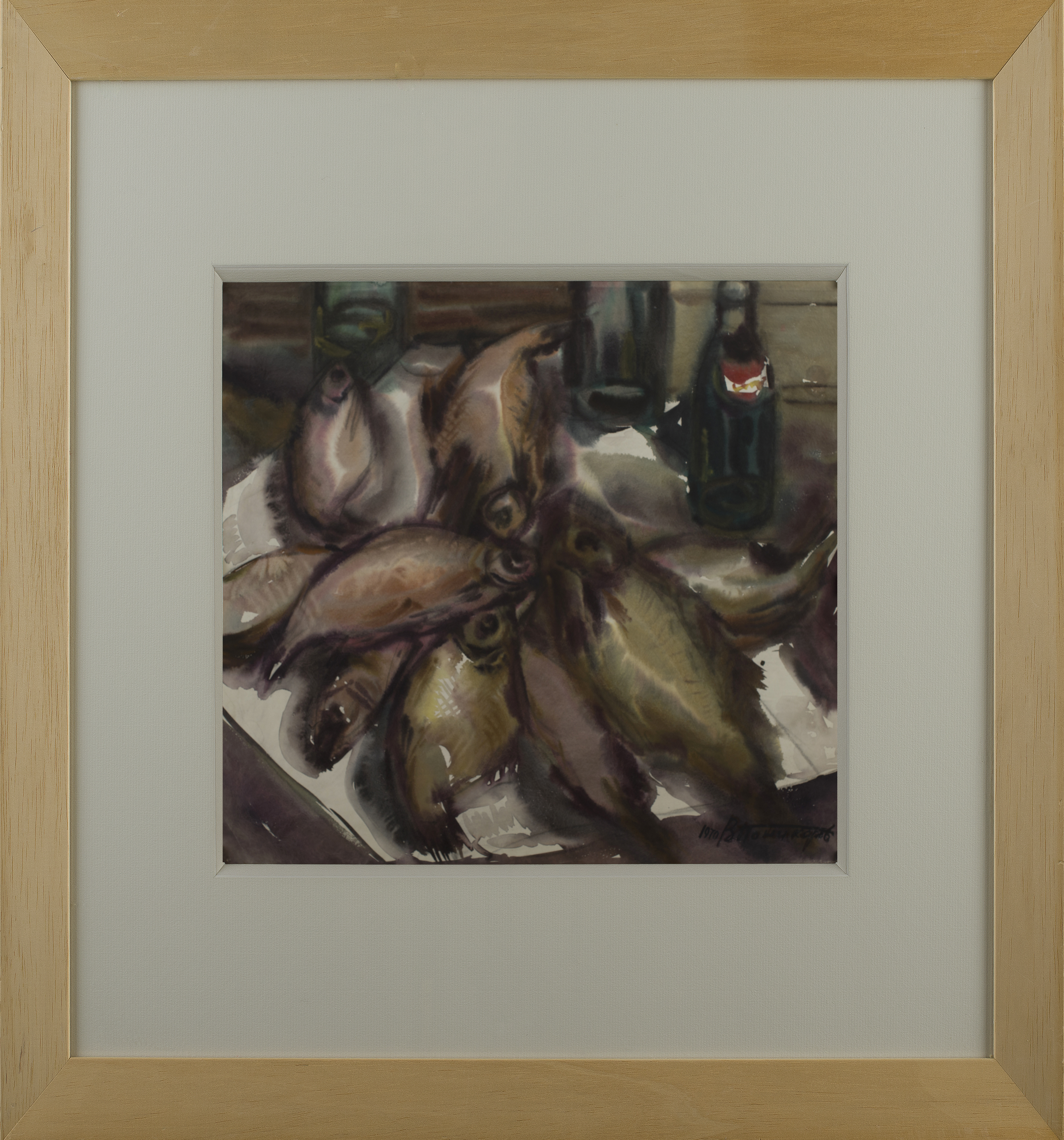
"Still life with a fish", (1970)

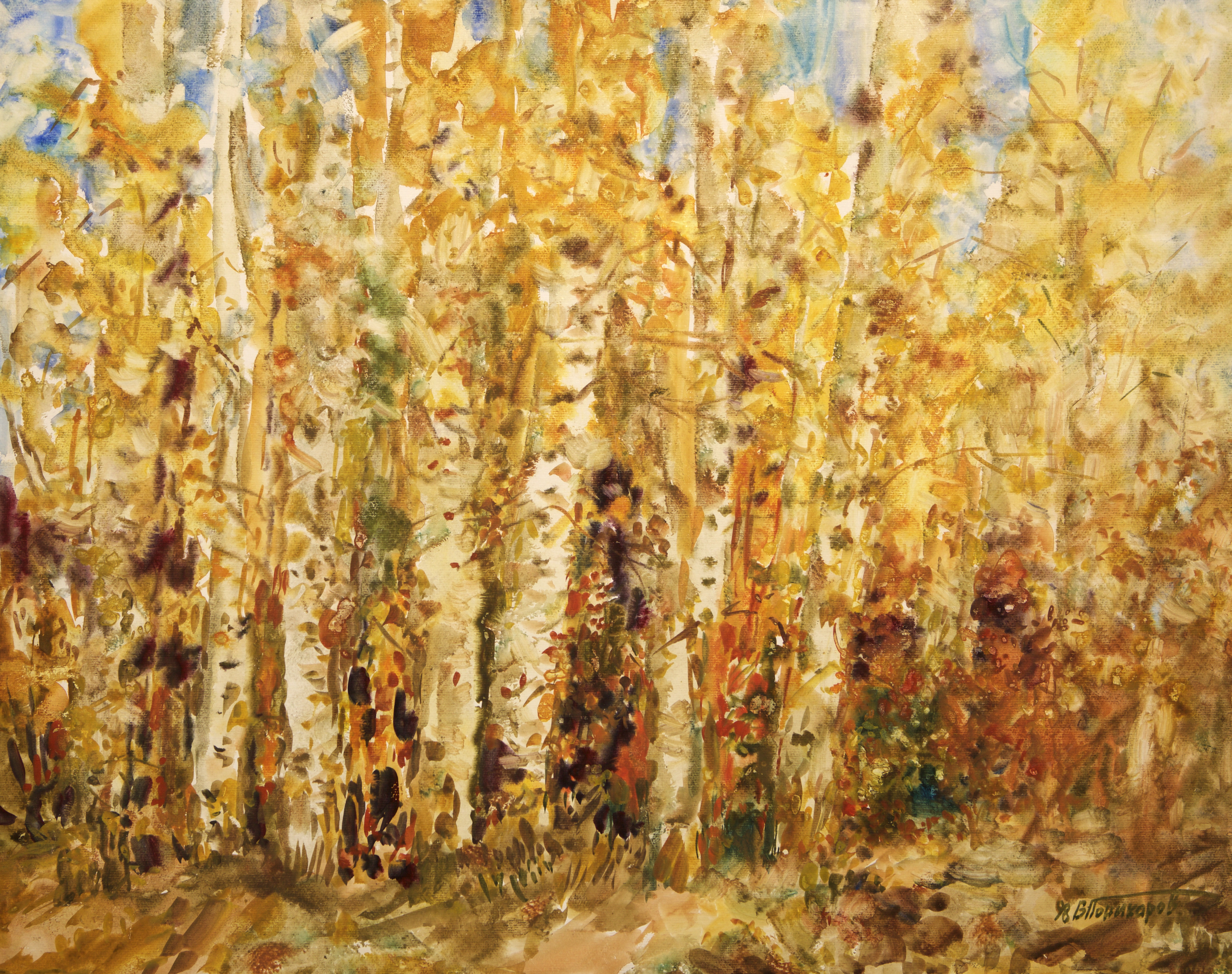
"Forest, birches, autumn", (89х72, 1998)

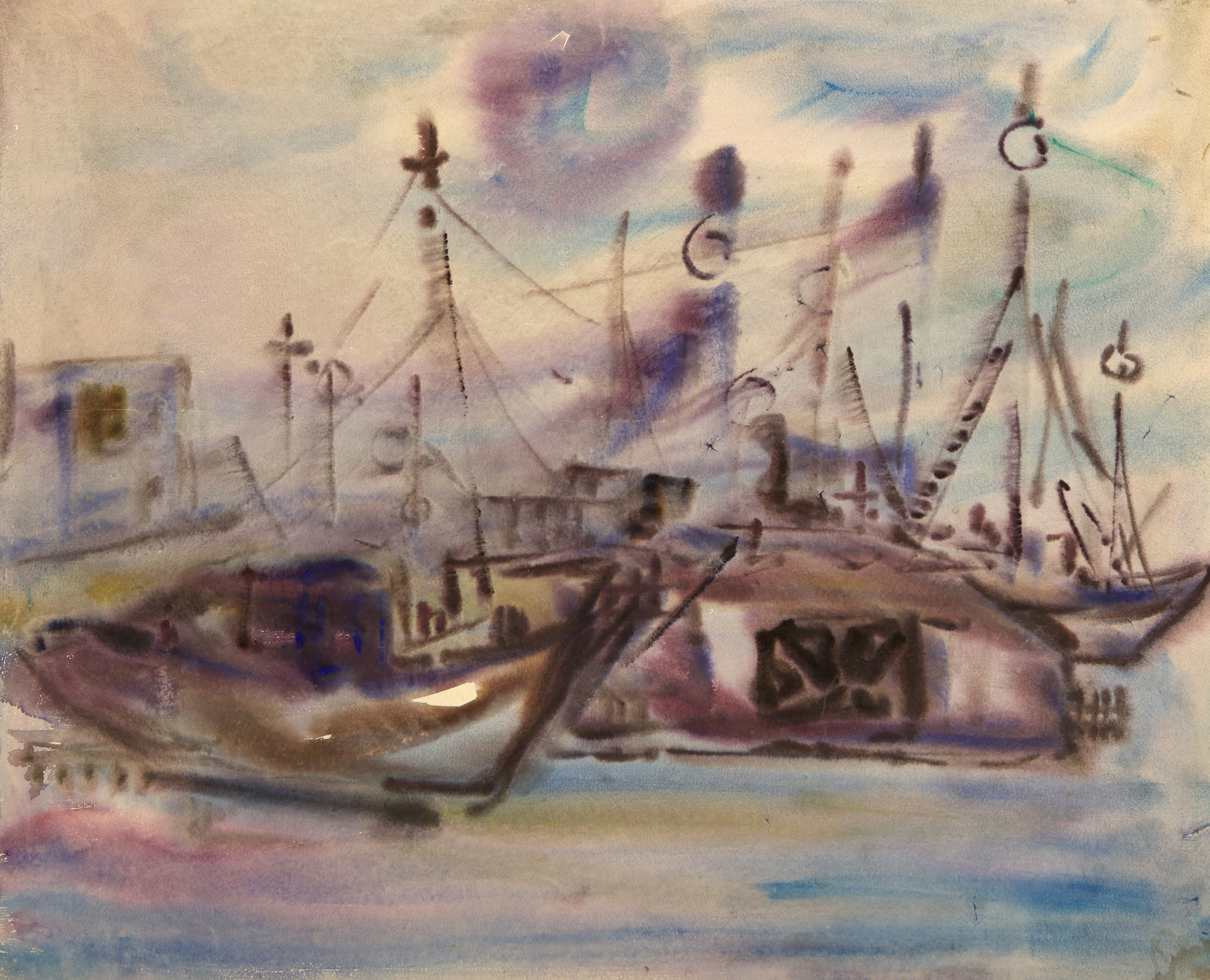
"Sea, boats, morning", (65х55, 1980)

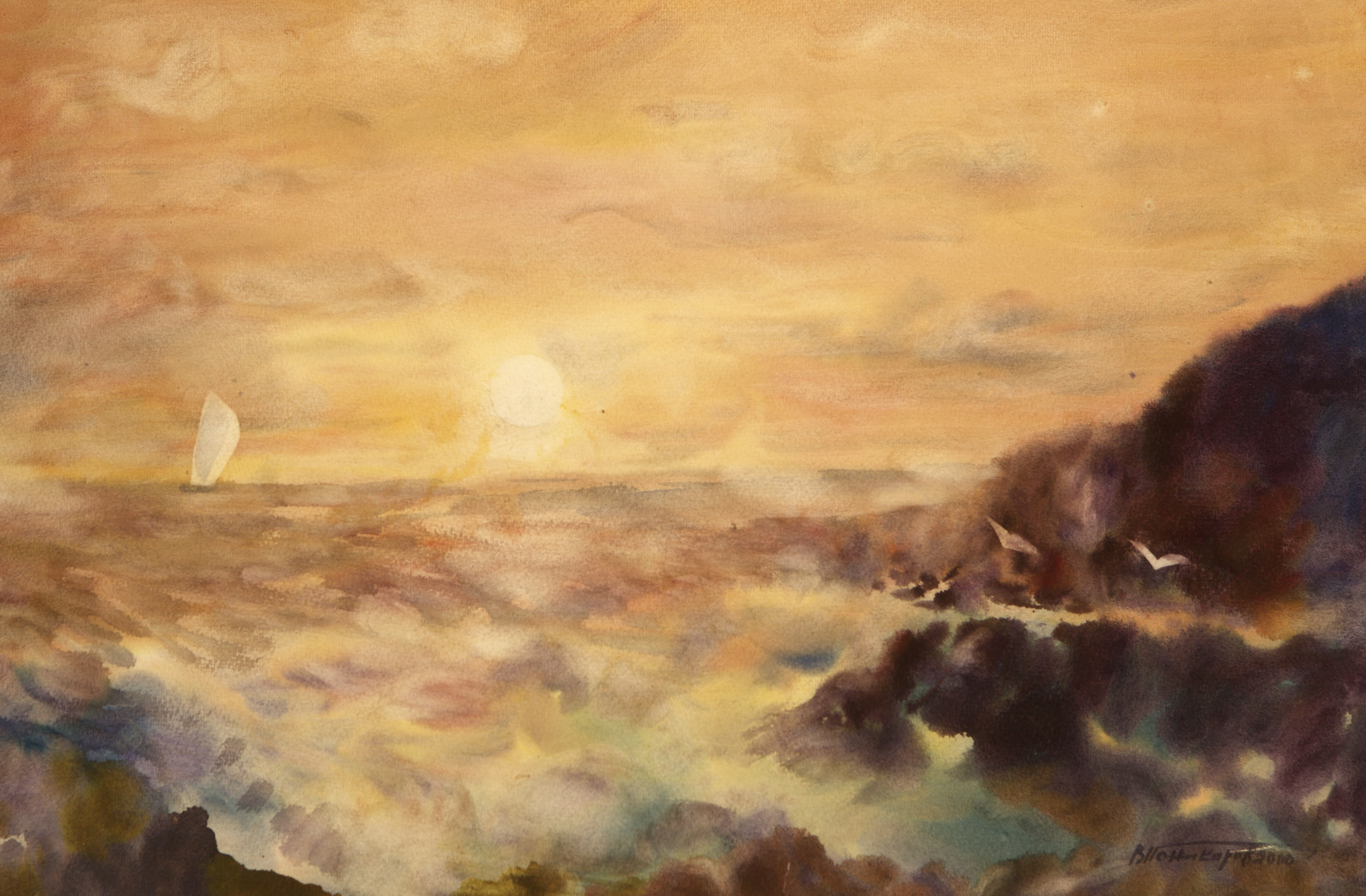
"Sea, yacht, rocks, sunset", (68.5х46, 2000)

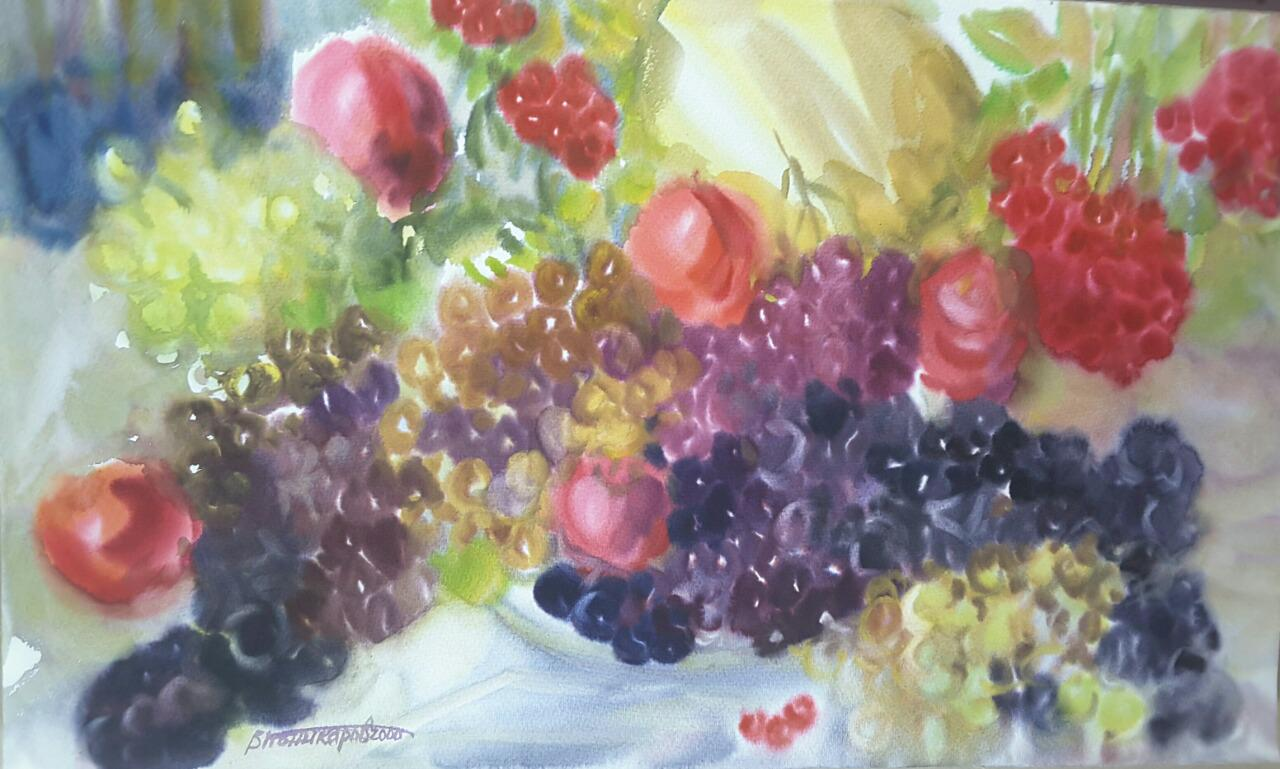
"Still life with a melon and a grape", (2000)

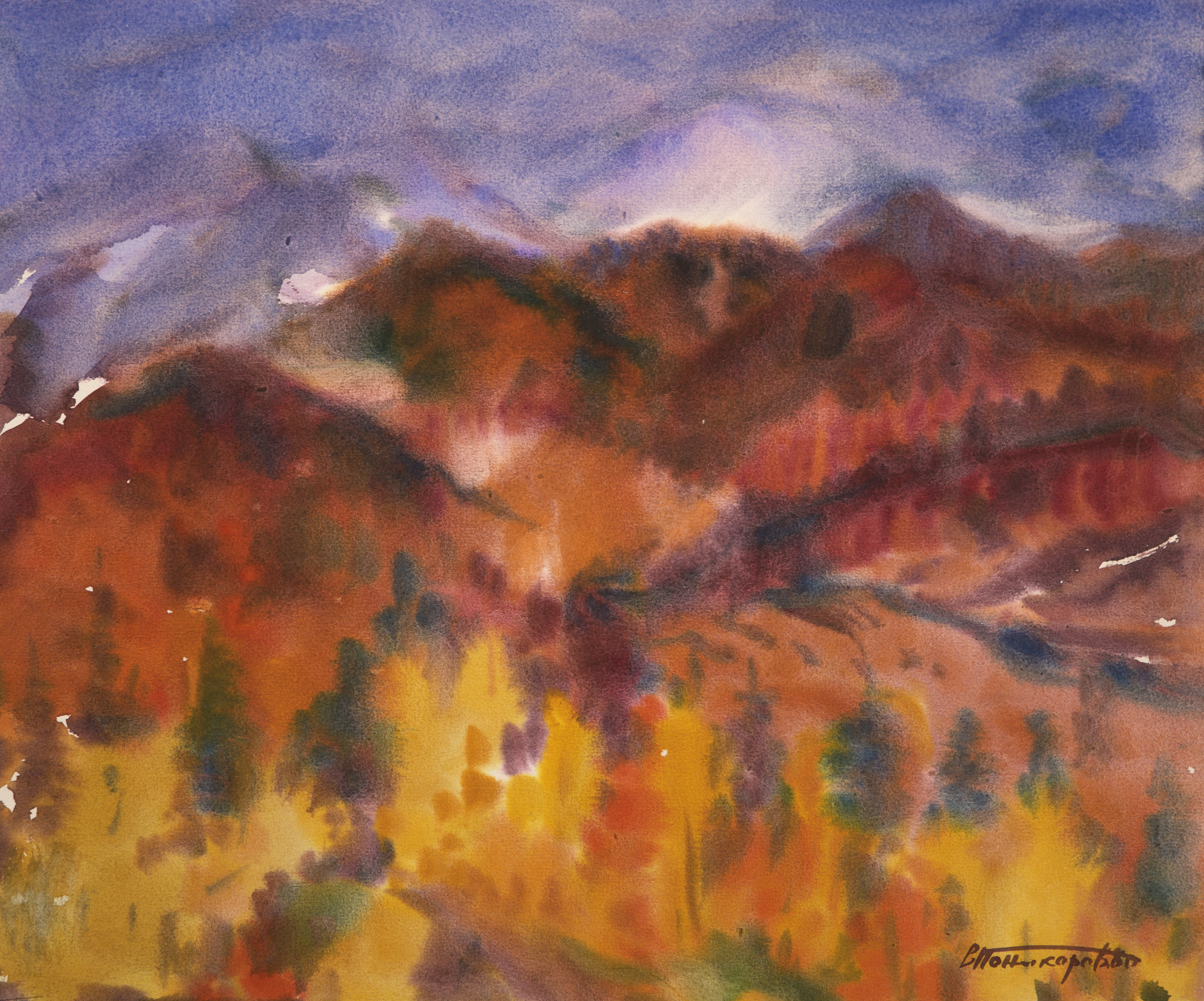
"Autumn, tree, mountains", (43х36, 1980)

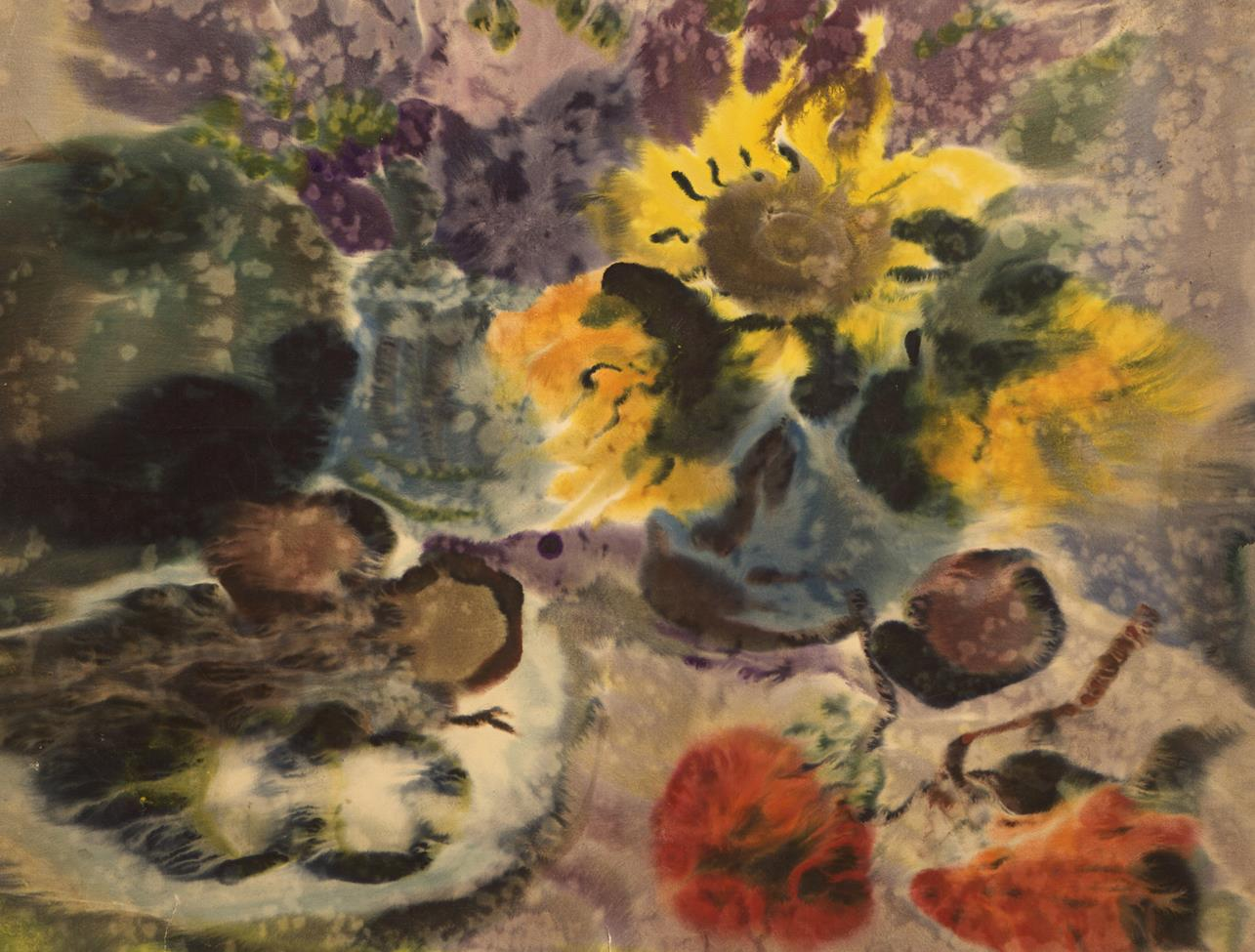
"Sunflowers, guelder rose", (76х60.5, 1985)

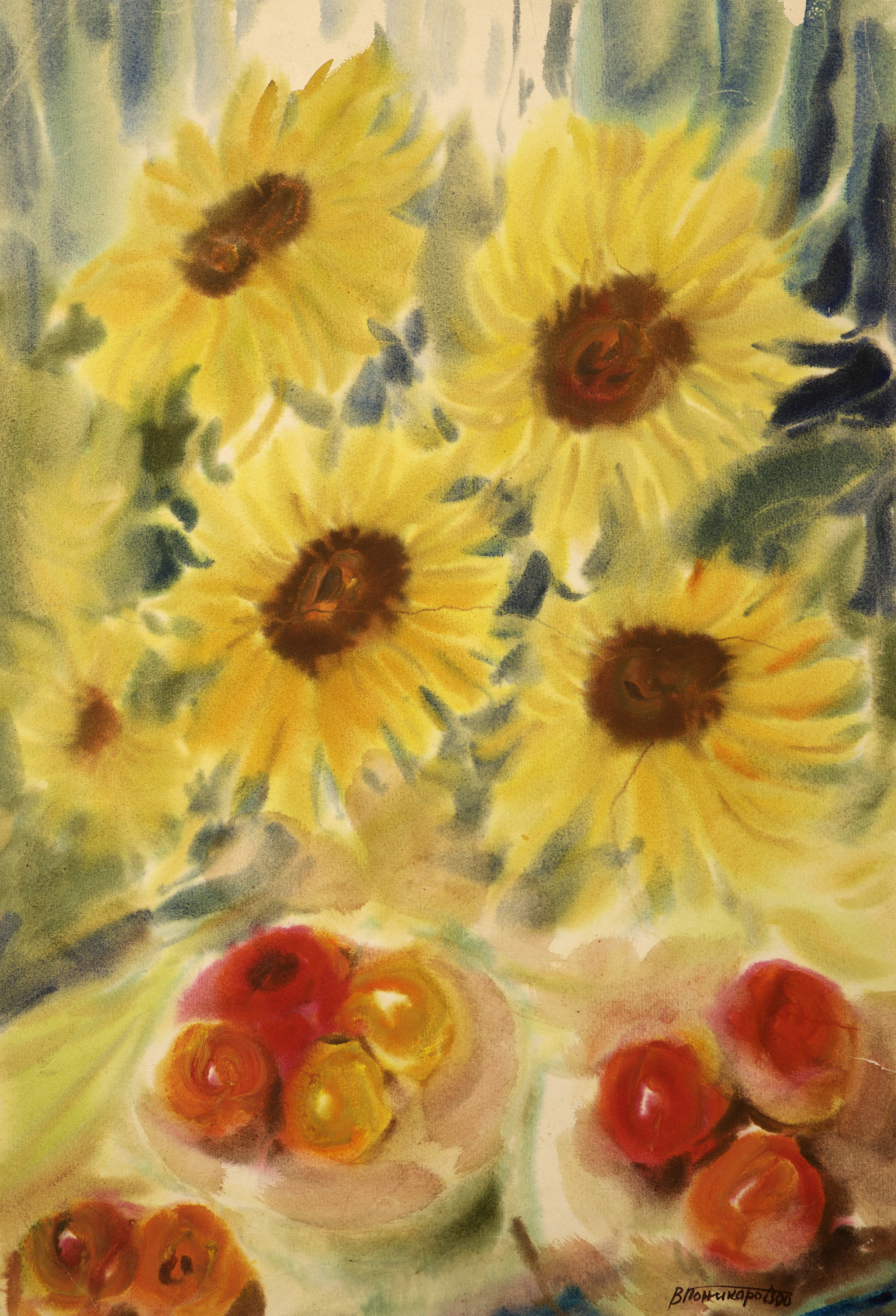
"Sunflowers, peaches", (47х69.5, 1990)

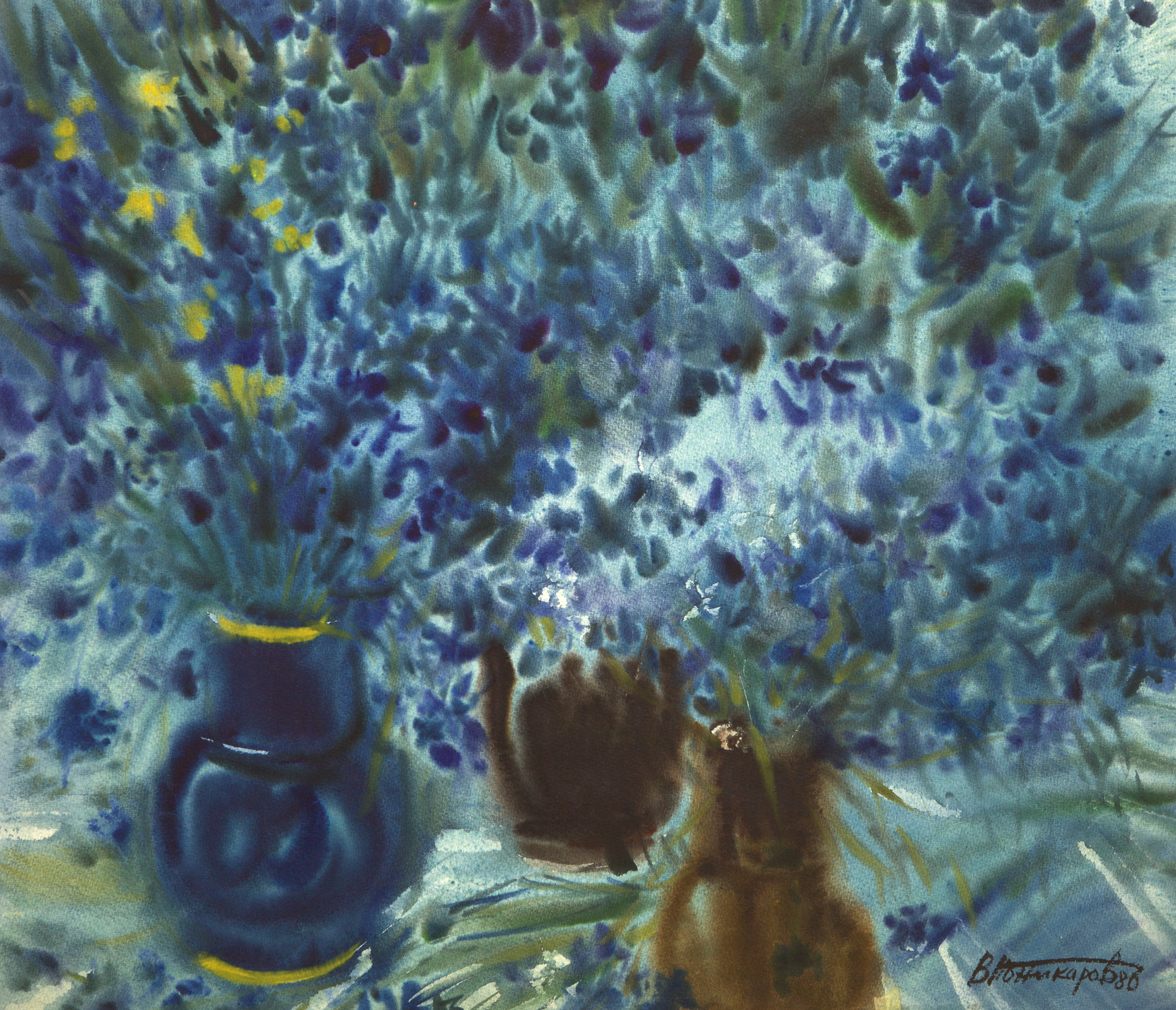
"Blue flowers", (78х67.5, 1980)

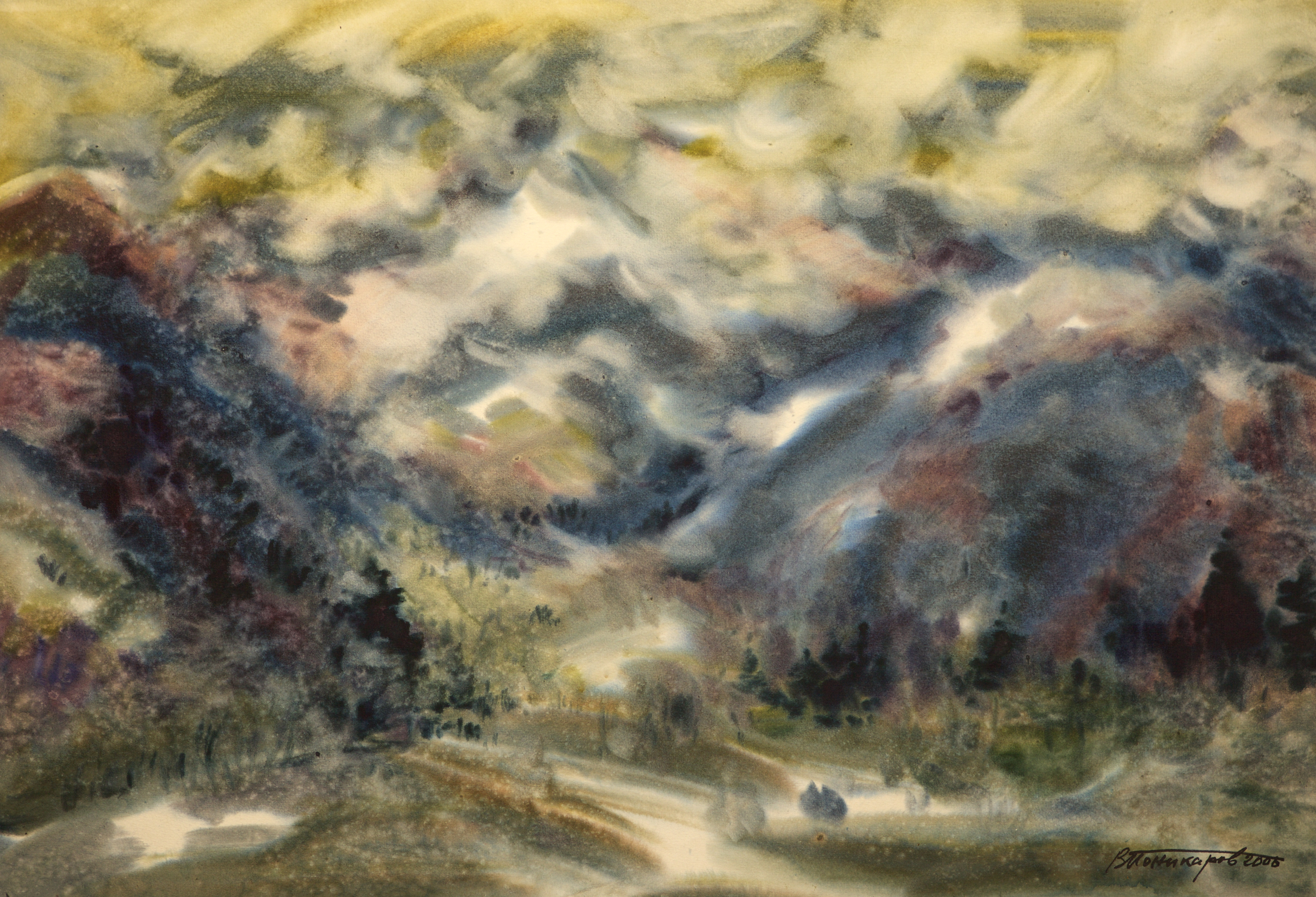
"Slopes, mountains, spring", (98х68, 2006)

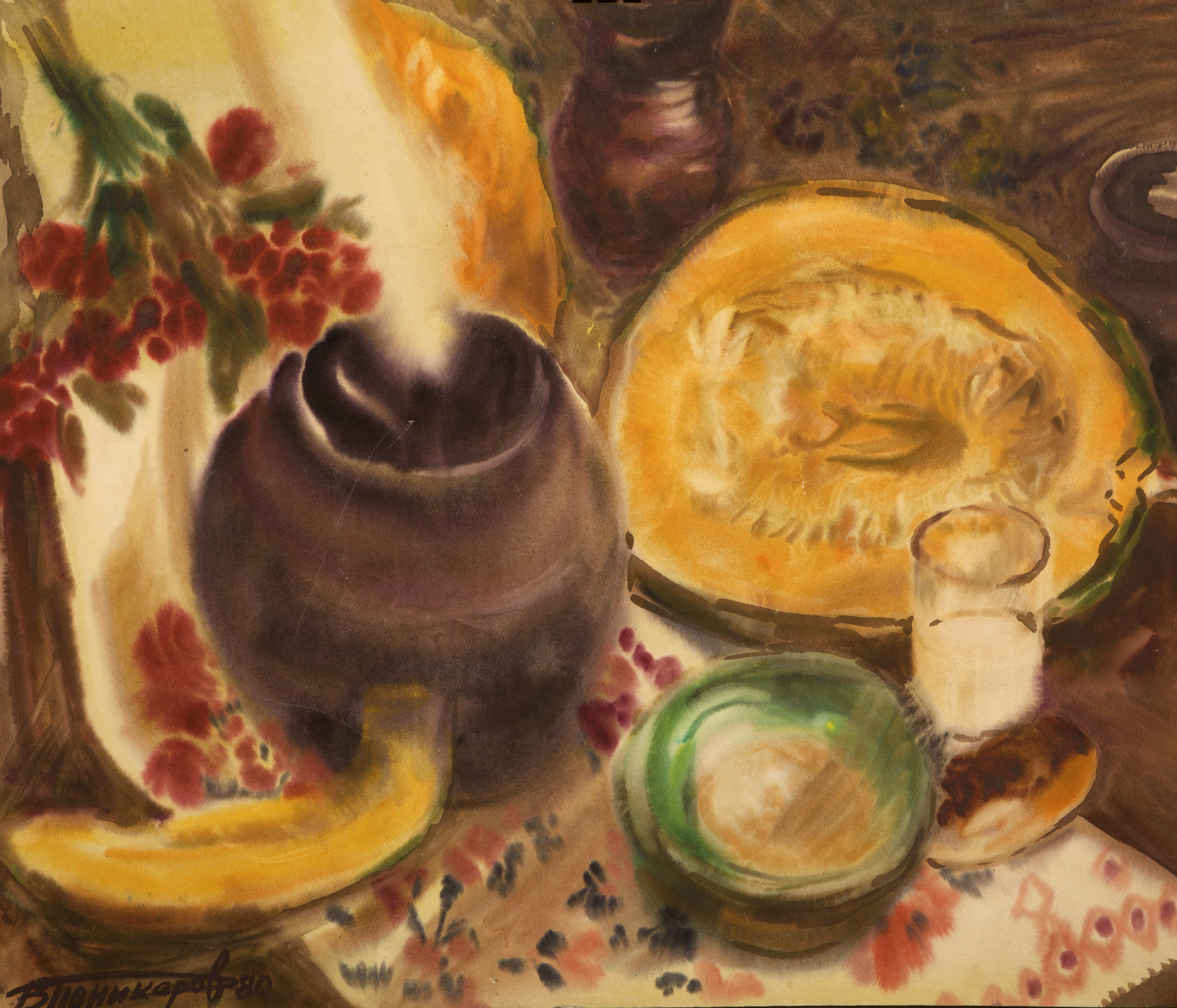
"Pumpkin, guelder rose", (69х60, 1980)

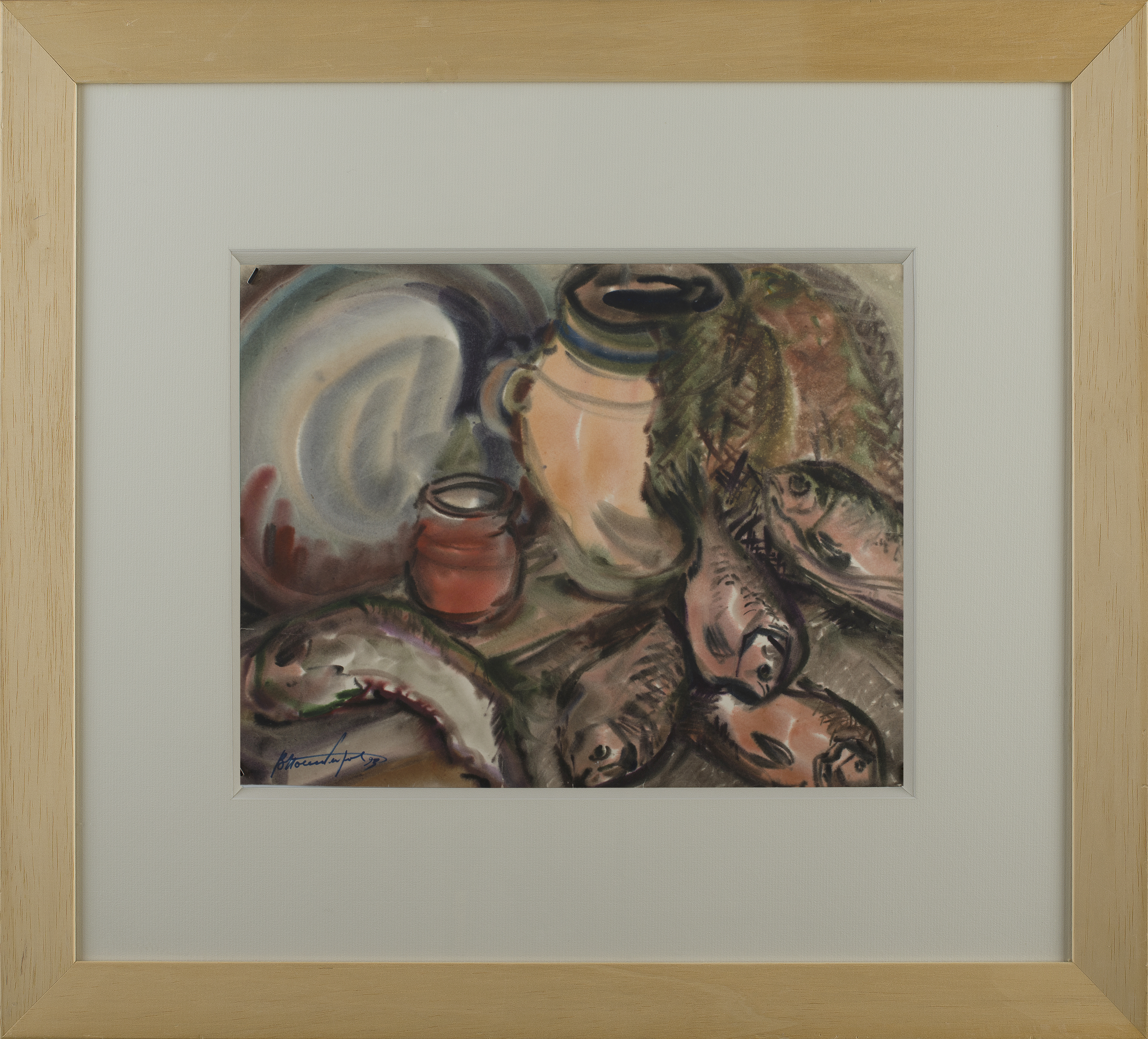
"Still life with a fish", (1993)

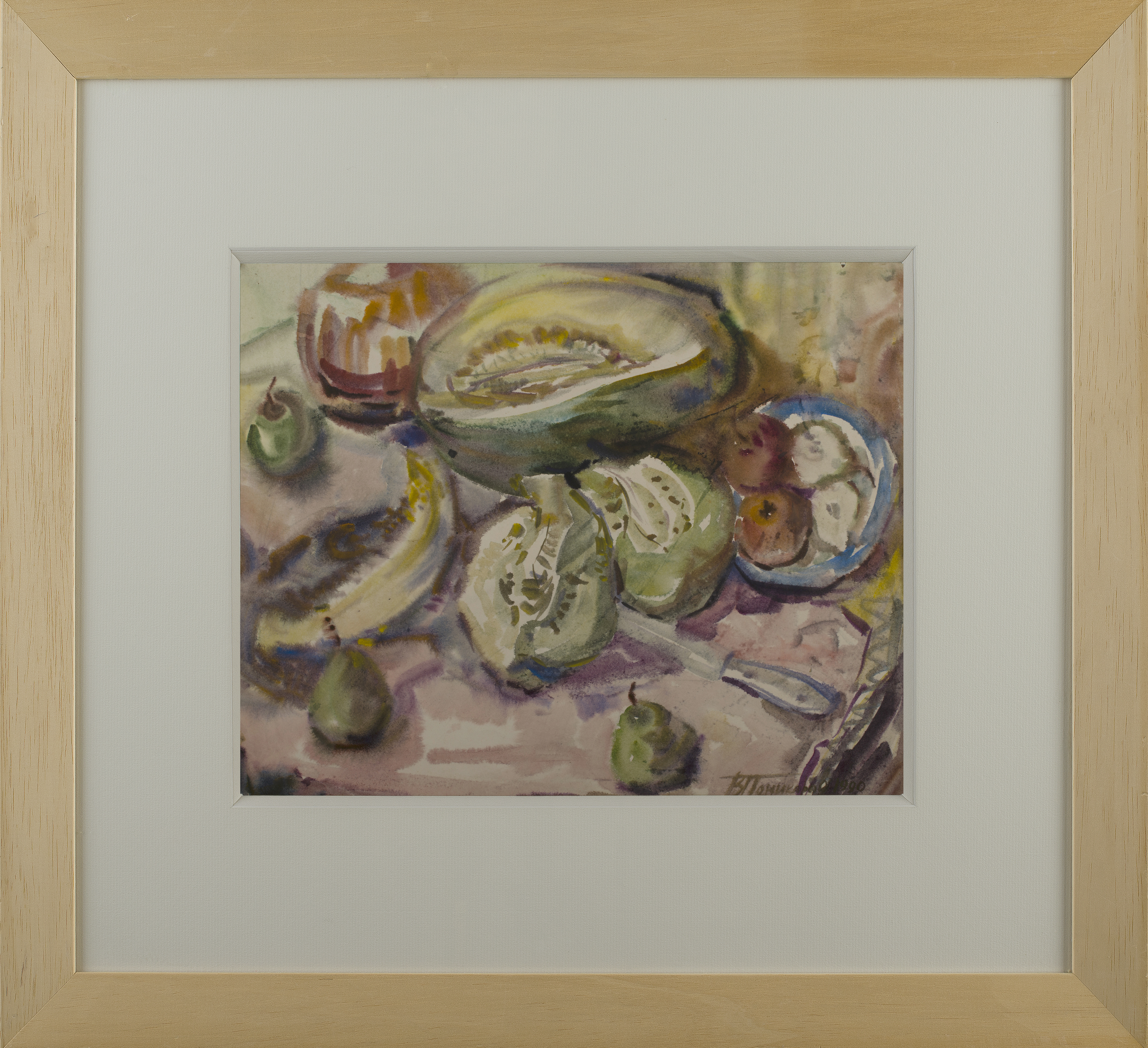
"Still life, melon", (1990)

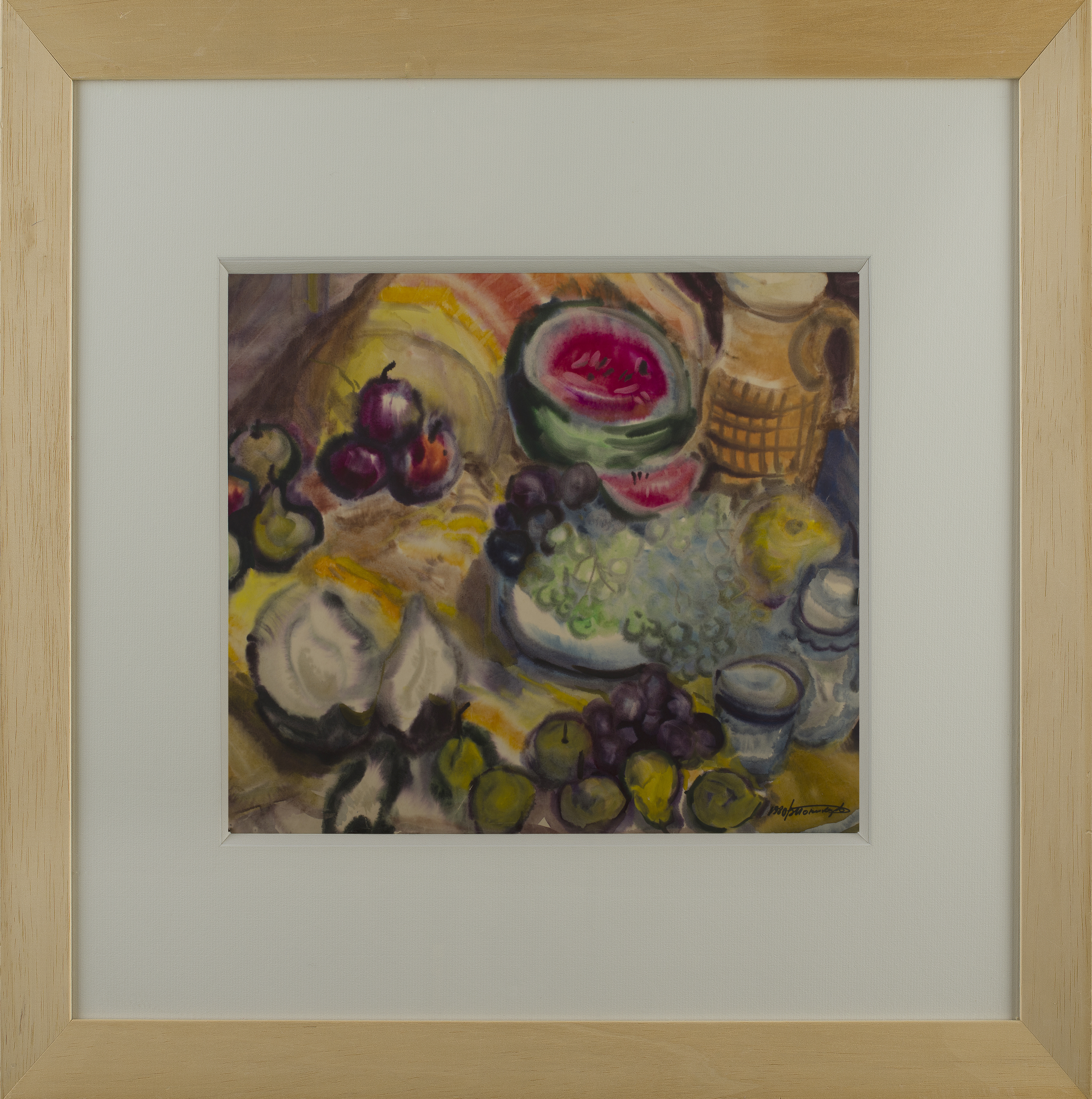
"Still life, fruits", (1980)

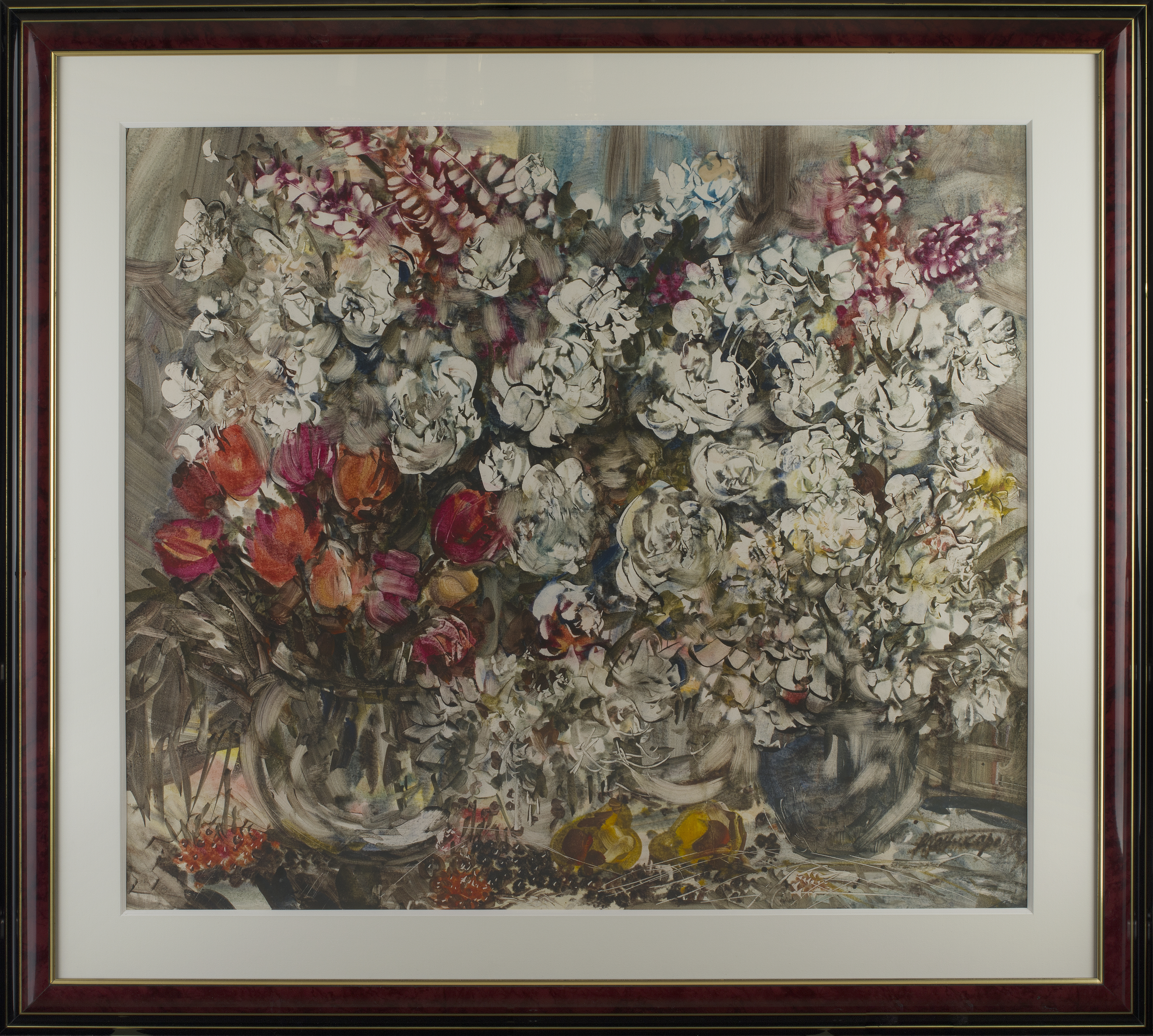
"Peonies", (1994)

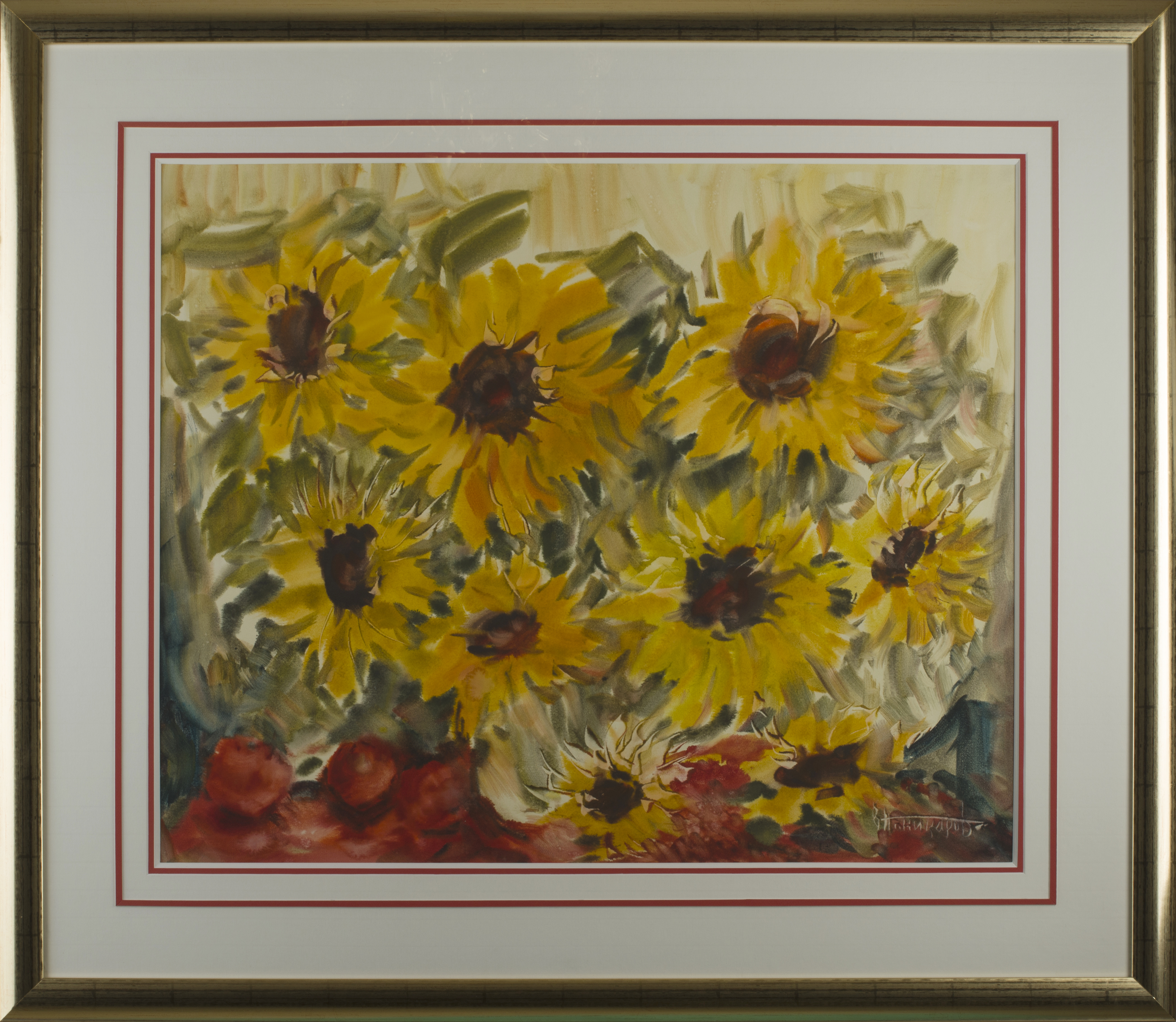
"Sunflowers", (2005)

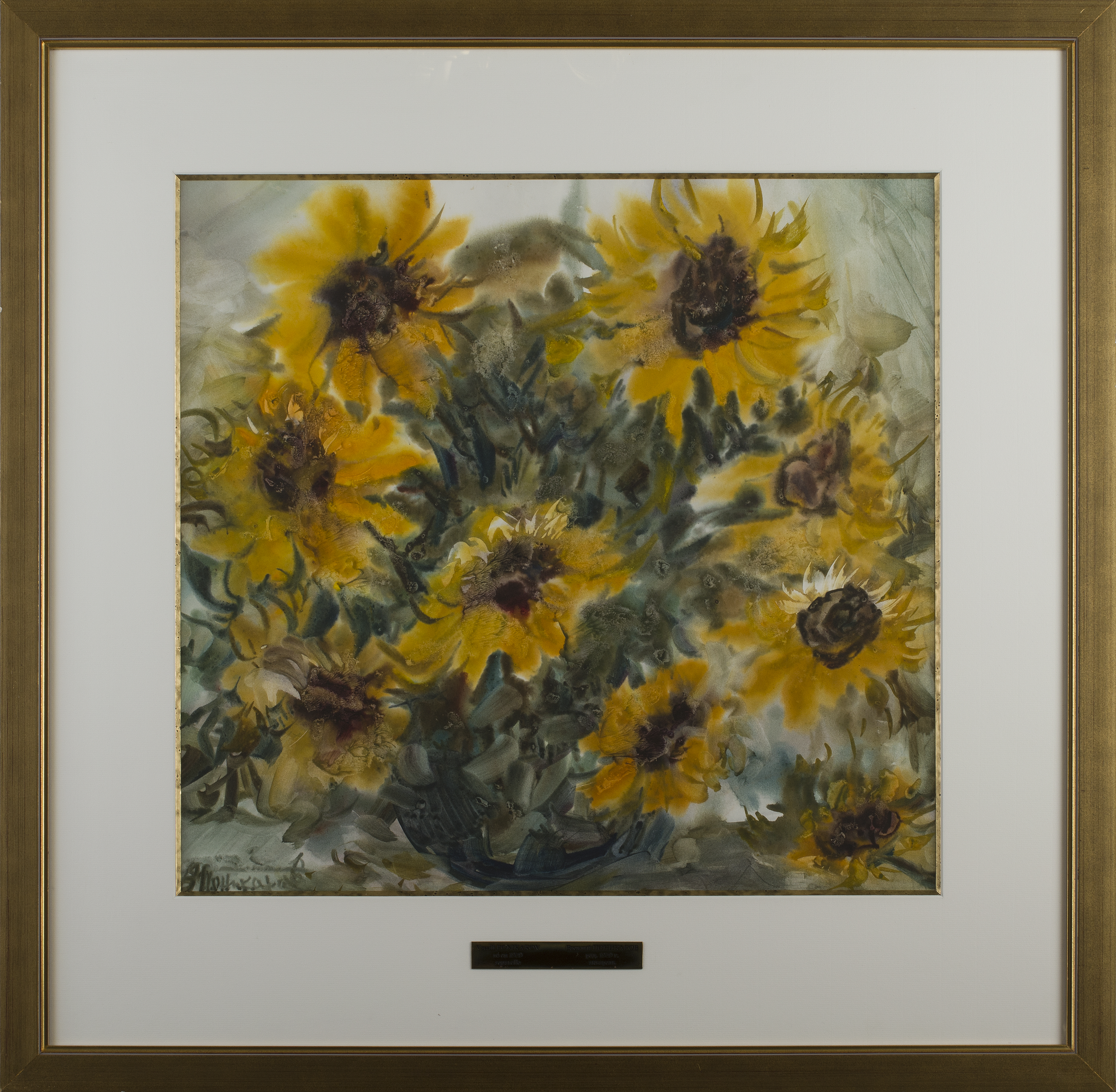
"Sunflowers"

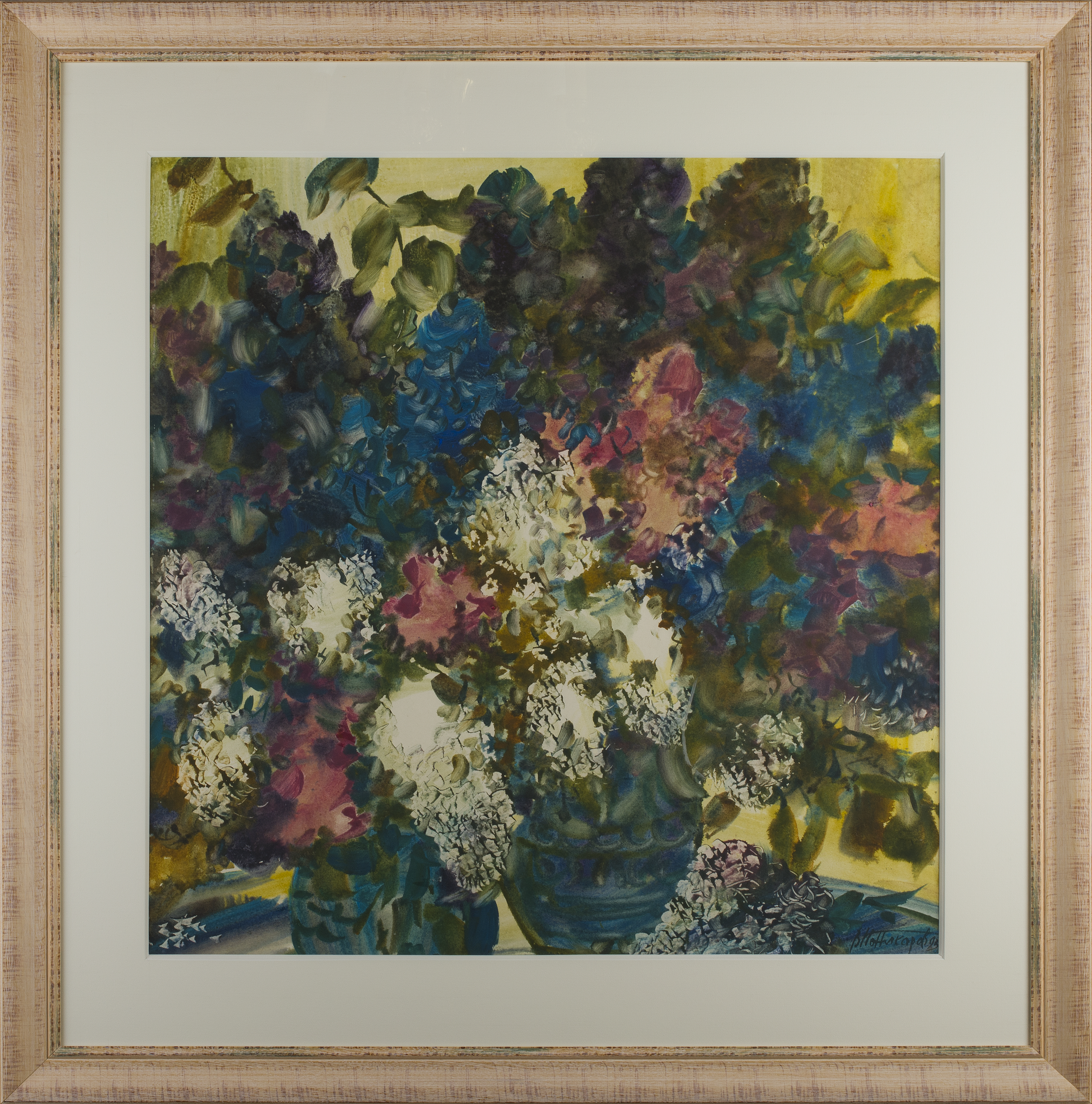
"Lilac", (1993)

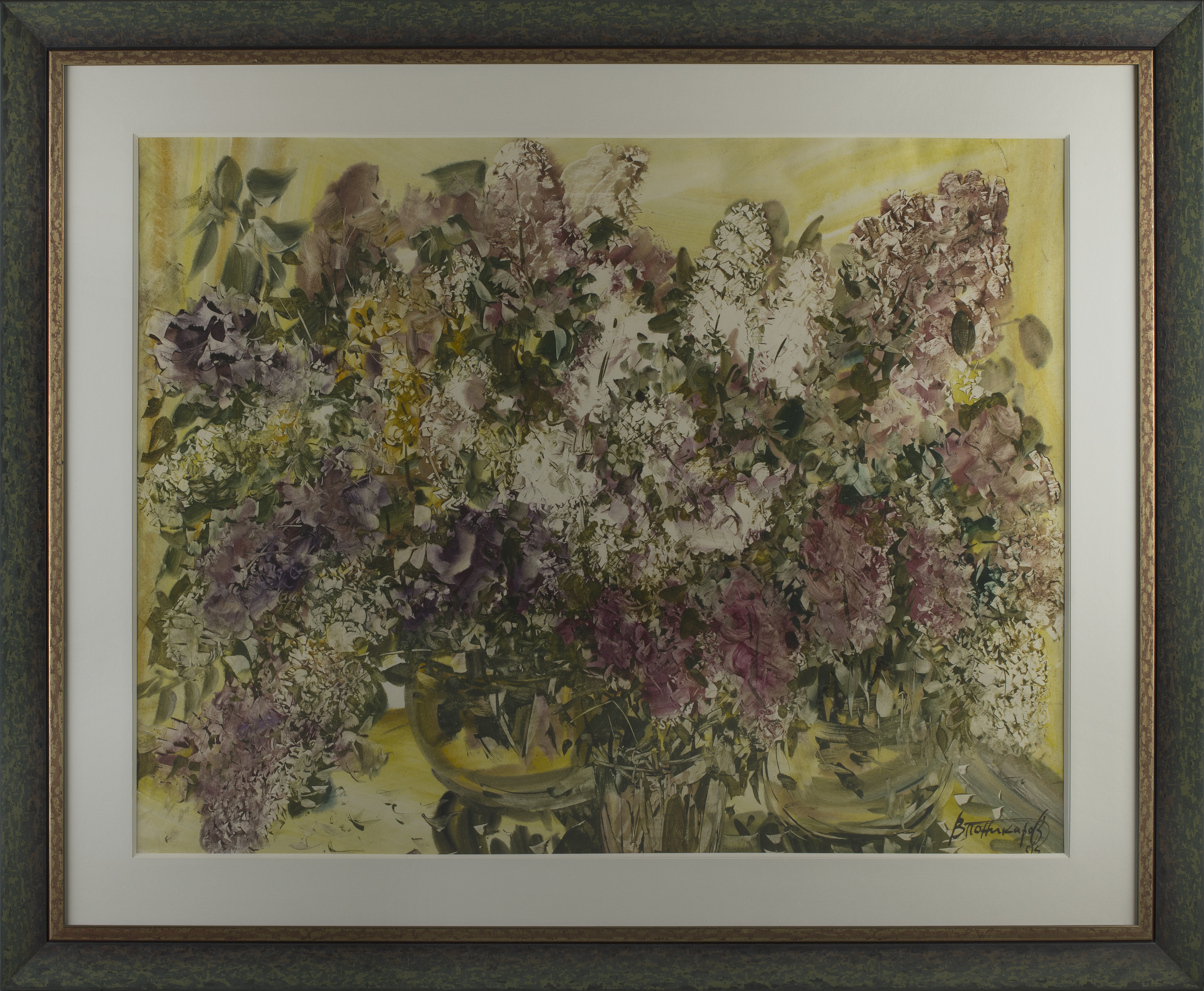
"Lilac", (1995)

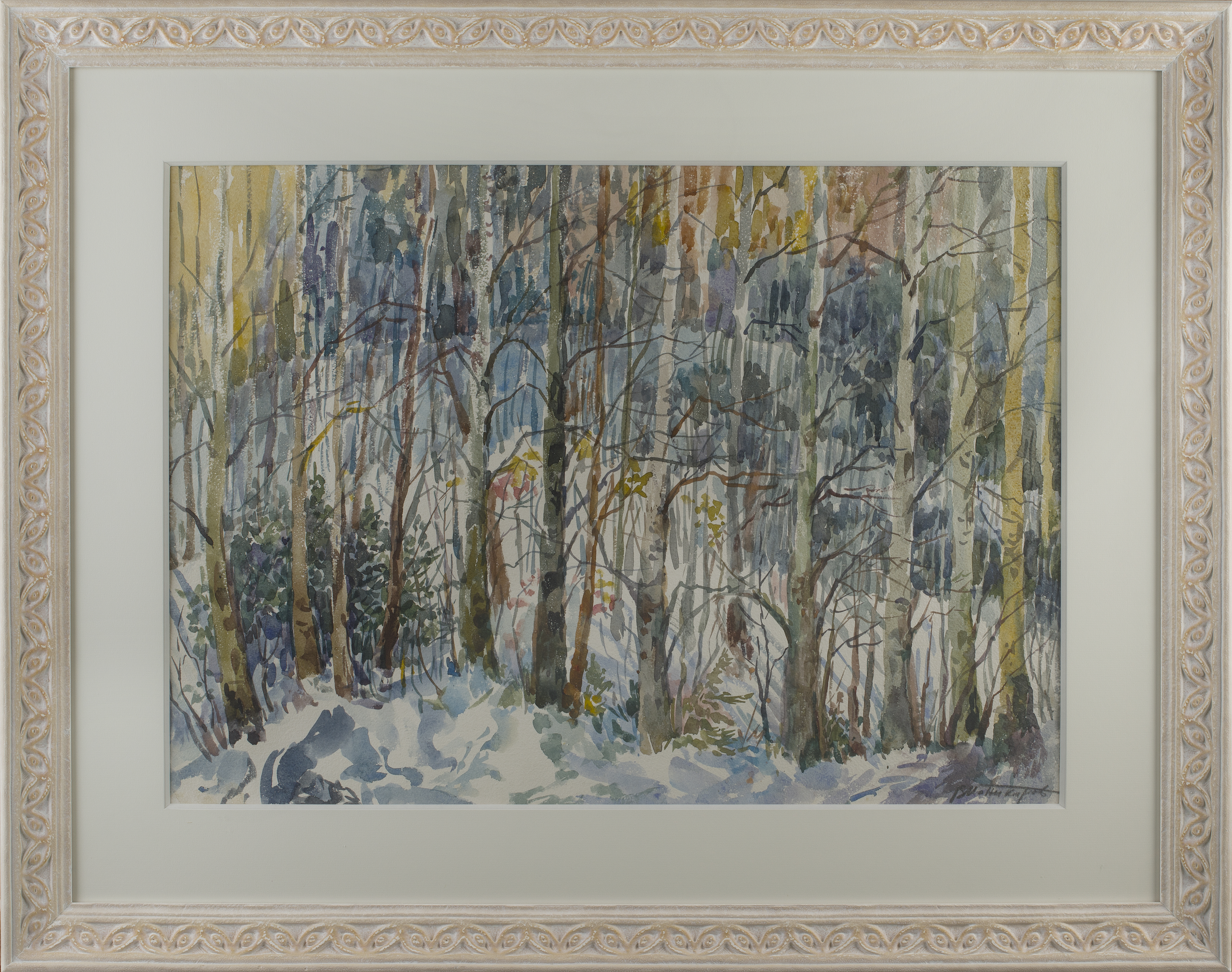
"Snowy birches"

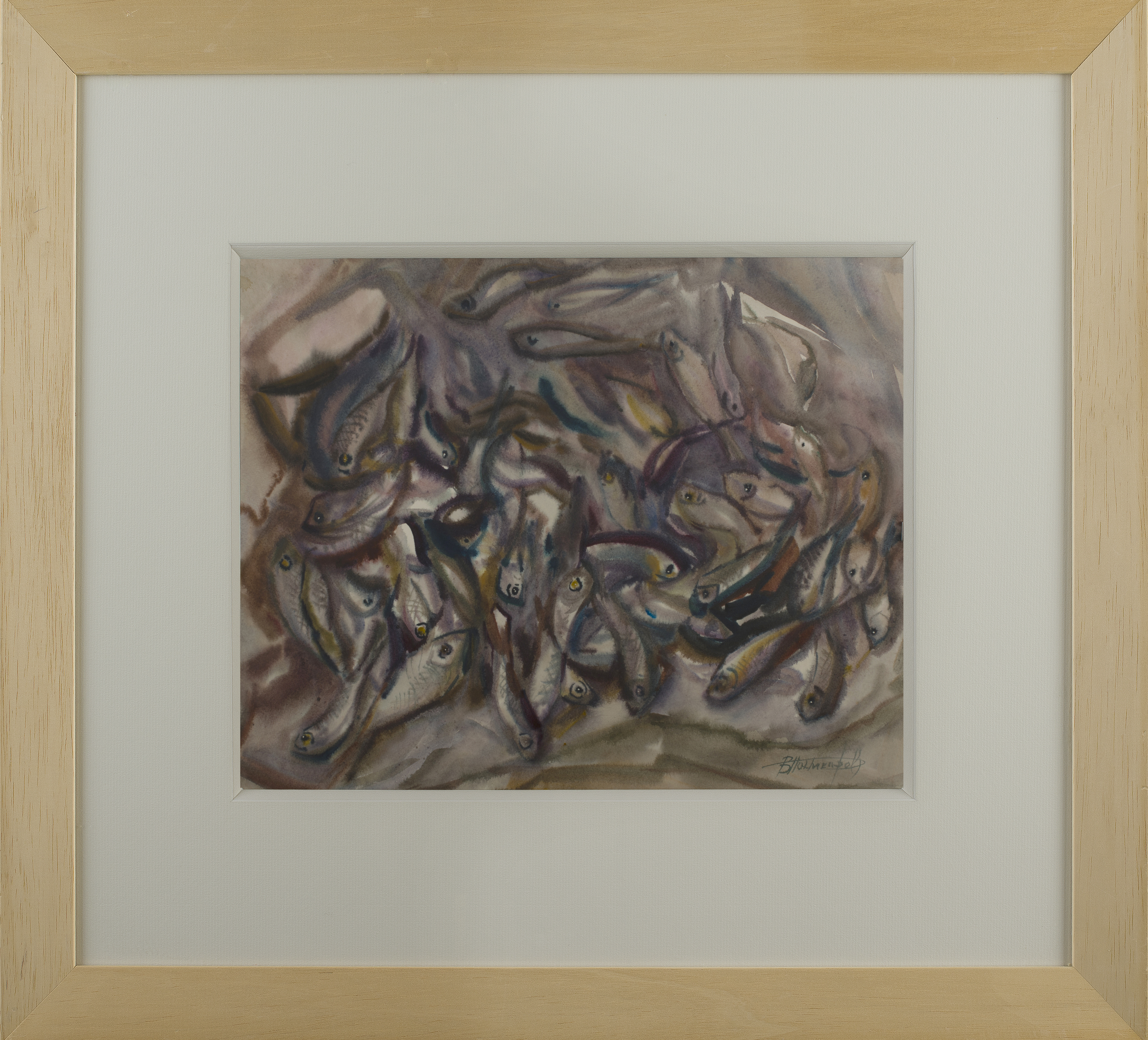
"Whitebait"

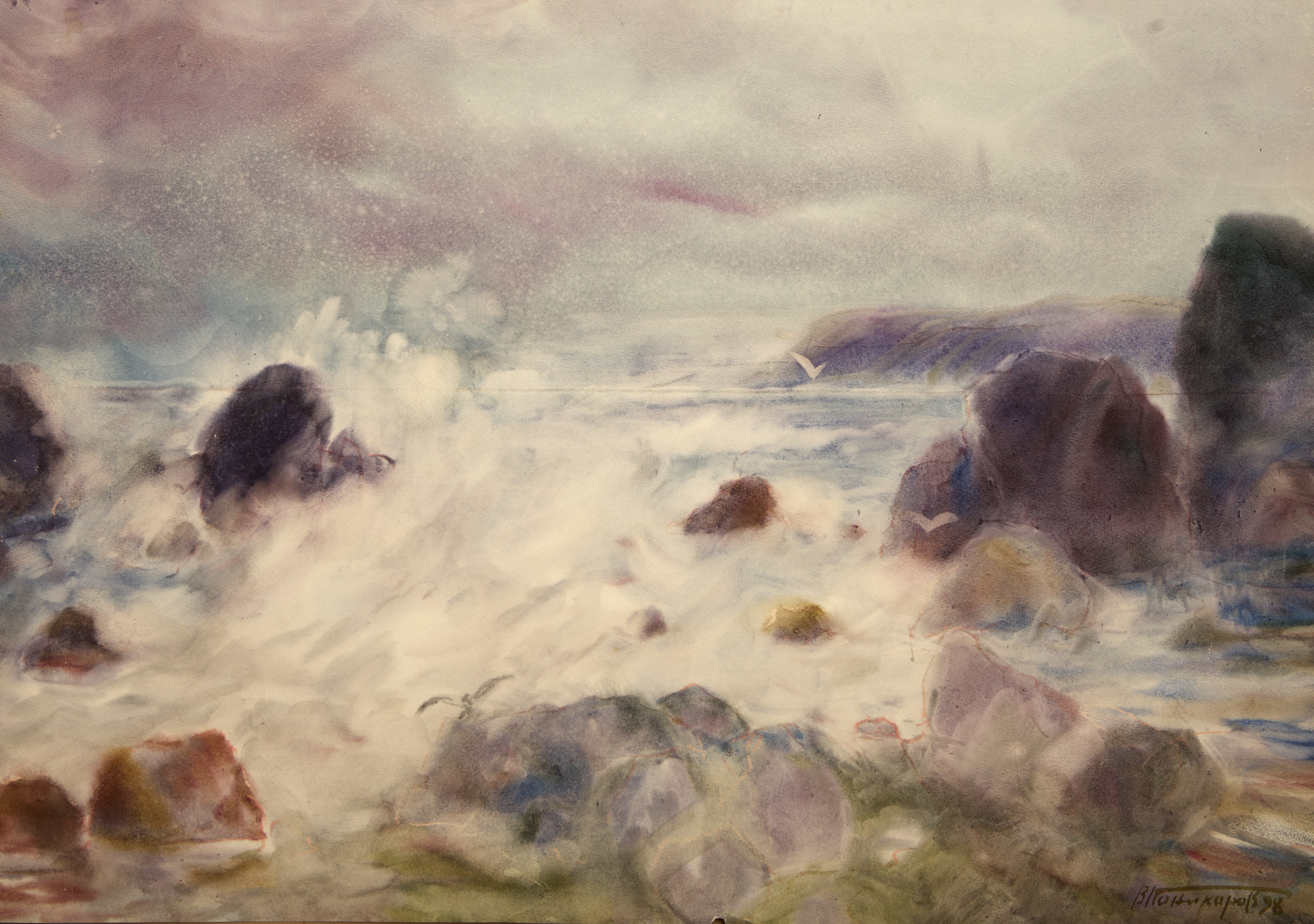
"Storm, stones", (97х69, 1998)

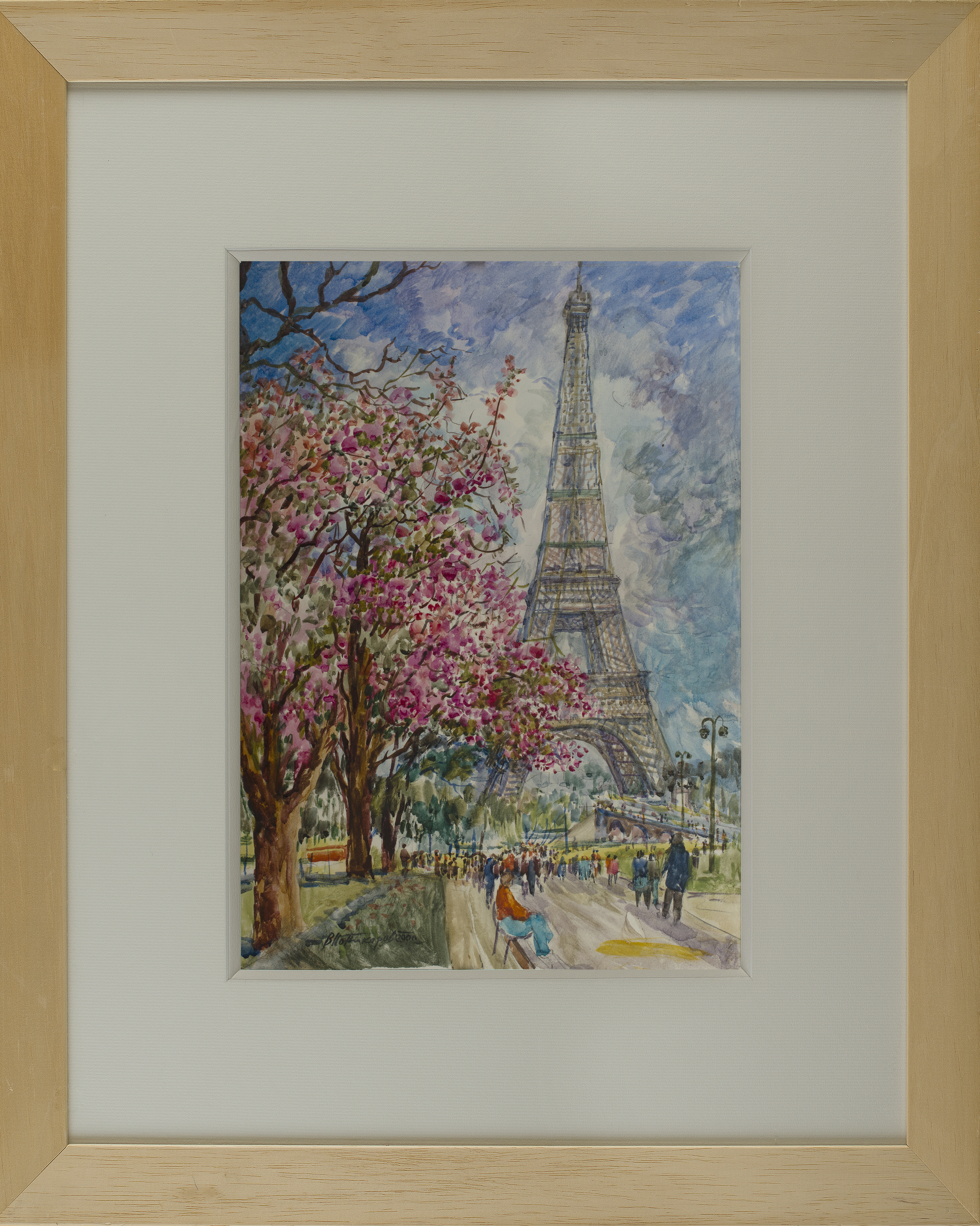
"Eiffel Tower", (2000)

== Awards ==
- 1998 – Master of watercolor, diploma of the program "Gold Masters of Odesa", Odesa
- 1998 – Grand prix of Montgermont watercolor salon, commune Montgermont, France
- 2002 – Winner in nomination "Artist of the year" in the competition "National recognition", Odesa
- 2005 – Participant of the Watercolor Fair of Belgium, certificate of participant, Namur, Belgium
- 2005 – Honoured Artist of Ukraine, state title
- 2007 – Laureate of the contest "Your names, Odesa!" in nomination "The best works of fine art (graphics)"
- 2012 – Laureate of the contest "Diamond Duke", diploma of the laureate of the contest "Diamond Duke" named after De Richelieu in nomination "Painting, Graphics", project "Save and Protect", Odesa
- 2014 – Participant of the exhibition "Light of harmony", diploma of participant, the exhibition which was held within the framework of the international project "World without borders", Moscow, Russia
- Participant of the exhibition "Marinists of Odesa – dedicated to the day of Saint Nicholas", commendation, Odesa

== Exhibitions ==
=== Personal exhibitions ===
- 1984 – Odesa
- 1986 – Odesa
- 1987 – Kyiv
- 1999 – in the Museum of Western and Eastern Art, Odesa
- 2002 – in the Odesa Art Museum
- 2004 – in the gallery of the club "Windrose", Oberursel, Germany
- 2005 – Oslo, Norway
- 2006 – in the Art Salon of the Union of Artists, Odesa
- 2008 – in the gallery of ''World-Wide Club of Odessites'', Odesa
- 2009 – on the occasion of the eightieth anniversary of the artist, in the Museum of Western and Eastern Art, Odesa
- 2010 – in the gallery "Sady Pobedy"(Russian: "Сады Победы"), Odesa
- 2011 – in the Museum of Western and Eastern Art, Odesa

=== Exhibitions of works of Odesa artists ===
- 1969 – Szeged, Hungary
- 1970 – Bulgaria
- 1974 – Italy
- 1974 – Exhibition "Odesa – Marseille", Italy
- 1976 – Genoa, Italy
- 1977 – Szeged, Hungary
- 1977 – Bulgaria
- 1977 – Baltimore, USA
- 1980 – Szeged, Hungary
- 1981 – Genoa, Italy
- 1985 – Geneva, Switzerland
- 1987 – Finland
- 1990 – Genoa, Italy
- 1991 – in the Soviet Fund of Culture, Moscow, Russia
- 1992 – New-York, USA
- 1992 – in the embassy of Japan, Moscow, Russia
- 1993 – in "Russian center", Jerusalem, Israel
- 1996 – Mexico

=== Exhibitions "Picturesque Ukraine"(Ukrainian: "Мальовнича Україна") ===
- 2002 – Ukrainian House, Kyiv
- 2003 – National Art Museum of Ukraine, Kyiv
- 2007 – National Art Museum of Ukraine, Kyiv

=== Others ===
- 1977 – Watercolor exhibition of Odesa artists, Bulgaria
- 1982 – Exhibition "Contemporary art of Odesa", Genoa, Italy
- 1997 – "Gold Masters of Odesa", Odesa Art Museum
- 1997 – "Contemporary art of Ukraine", National Art Museum of Ukraine, Kyiv
- 1998 – Montgermont watercolor salon, commune Montgermont, France
- 1999 – Exhibition of private collections of watercolors, Paris, France
- 2000 – Exhibition of marinists. Marine gallery, Odesa
- 2001 – Tregastel International watercolor salon, commune Tregastel, France
- 2005 – Watercolor Fair of Belgium, Namur, Belgium
- 2009 – Exhibition-cultural program "Art-alphabet or Odesa's Montmartre", Odesa
- 2009 – Exhibition-project "Play of Color and Shape", г. Steinbach, Germany
- 2010 – Traveling exhibition "The Traveler" (Russian: "Путешественница") devoted to the day of the land Hesse, Oberursel, Germany
- 2014 – Exhibition "Light of harmony", international project "World without borders", Moscow, Russia

=== Exhibitions after the death of the artist ===
- 2015 – Personal exhibition, International Forum Eurowoman 2015, in Tbilisi and in Batumi, Georgia
- 2015 – On the occasion of celebration of the day of Odesa, art-project "Magnifique opéra", Odesa
- 2015 – European forum of collectors, Kyiv
- 2015 – Personal exhibition "Transparency of a flower"(Ukrainian: "Прозорість Квітки"), Art gallery of madam Palmgren, Lviv, Ukraine
- 2016 – Personal exhibition in the gallery of World-Wide Club of Odessites, Odesa
- 2016 – Personal exhibition, charitable auction, in the Museum of Western and Eastern Art, Odesa

== Works of the artist in collections ==
=== In museums ===
- Odesa Art Museum
- Kharkiv Art Museum
- Central State Archive-Museum of Literature and Arts of Ukraine, Kyiv
- Mariupol museum of local lore
- Pryluky museum of local lore
- Izmail museum named after A.V. Suvorov
- Ochakiv museum of marine art
- Sharhorod folk museum
- International watercolor museum, Fabriano, Italy

=== In public institutions ===
- Odesa National A. V. Nezhdanova Academy of Music
- Hospital for invalids of the Great Patriotic War, Kyiv
- Kherson children's regional hospital
- Kyiv Scientific Research Institute of Otolaryngologyl
- Kyiv Scientific Research Institute of Cardiovascular Surgery
- Kyiv sports boarding school
- Rivne Palace of Pioneers and Schoolchildren

=== In galleries and private collections ===
- Workshop of Vasyl Ponikarov, Odesa
- Art collector Yves Mouden, Brest, France

== Literature ==
- Дымшиц, Эдуард (1988), "Вступительная статья", "Василий Поникаров". Акварель. Каталог выставки произведений (in Russian), Киев: Союз художников Украины, pp. 2–4
- "Солнечный и прекрасный мир". Коммерсант Юга (in Russian). No. 35(370)-36(371). Одесса: Черноморье. 3–17 September 1999. p. 7.
- Бродавко, Роман (1 September 2004). "Миллион алых роз". Одесский вестник (in Russian). Vol. 159, no. 3154. Одесса: Одесский городской совет. p. 7.
- Y.L. (24 May 1998). "Un Rennais deuxième prix de l'aquarelle". Ouest-France (in French). No. 21. p. 11. ISSN 0999-2138. Archived from the original on 18 August 2016.
- "Les hommes". Ouest-France (in French). No. 16278. 27 May 1998. p. 6. ISSN 0999-2138. Archived from the original on 18 August 2016.
- Warny S.; Laverdure C.; Melin G.; Melin M.; Paul F.; Vosse G. (2005). Salon de l'Aquarelle de Belgique 2005 (in French). Namur: MediaScreen a Bouge. pp. 142, 157. ISBN 2-9600142-4-3. Archived from the original on 18 August 2016.
- Соловьёв, Владимир (2005). Русские художники XVIII-XX веков (in Russian). Москва: Эксперт-Клуб. p. 18. ISBN 5-98881-004-7.
- Ананьева, Елена (2013). "Международный многоуровневый конкурс имени де Ришелье". Штрихи и пробелы квадрата древних; Международный многоуровневый конкурс имени де Ришелье. Золотые мастера Одессы (in Russian). Одесса: Астропринт. p. 15. ISBN 978-966-190-775-0.
- Алексенко, Елена (2008). Тимохова, Ирина (ed.). Цветок прозрачен (in Russian). Одесса: АОЗТ типографии "Моряк". p. 6. ISBN 978-5-911511-05-0.
- "Василий Поникаров". Каталог произведений Василия Андреевича Поникарова (in Russian). Одесса: Издательский дом "Крона". 1995. p. 3. ISBN 978-5-94663-437-3.
- "Василий Поникаров". Акварель. Каталог выставки произведений (in Russian). Киев: Союз художников Украины. 1988. p. 32.
- "Erste Ausstellung mit Aquarellen aus der Ukraine". Oberurseler Woche (in German). No. 9. Oberurseler: Hochtaunus Verlag GmbH. 26 February 2004. p. 16.
