= Saint-Grégoire, Ille-et-Vilaine =

Saint-Grégoire Saent-Gregoèrr (Gallo) Sant-Gregor (Breton)
- Commune
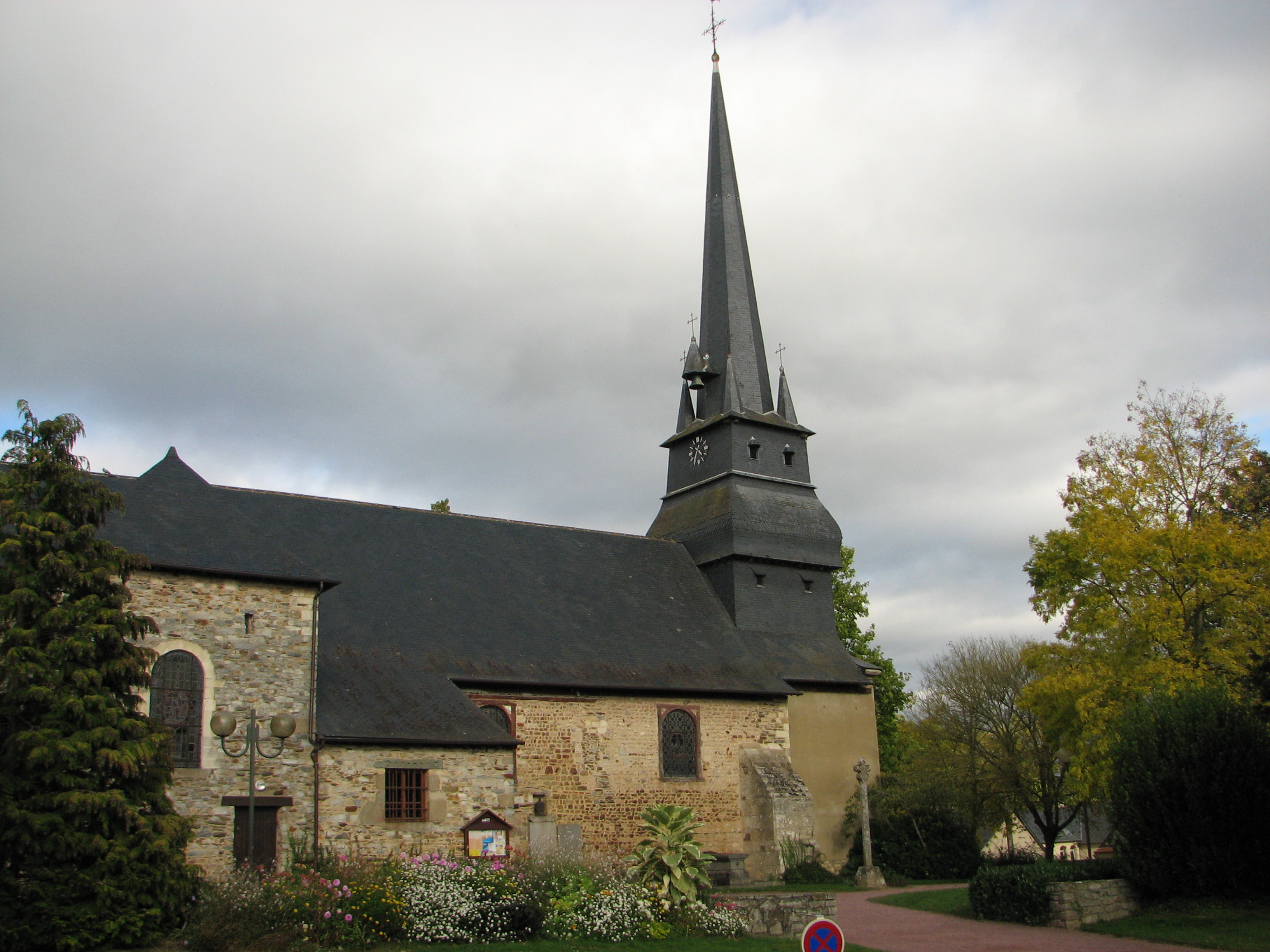
- The church of Saint-Grégoire
- Location of Saint-Grégoire
- Location within France Location within Brittany
- Coordinates: 48°09′06″N 1°41′06″W
- Country: France
- Region: Brittany
- Department: Ille-et-Vilaine
- Arrondissement: Rennes
- Canton: Betton
- Intercommunality: Rennes Métropole

Government
  - Mayor (2024–2026): Laëtitia Remoissenet
- Area^{1}: 17.30 km^{2} (6.68 sq mi)
- Highest elevation: 92 m (302 ft)
- Lowest elevation: 25 m (82 ft)
- Population (2023): 9,957
  - Density: 575.5/km^{2} (1,491/sq mi)
- Time zone: UTC+01:00 (CET)
  - Summer (DST): UTC+02:00 (CEST)
- INSEE/Postal code: 35278 /35760
- ^{1} French Land Register data, which excludes lakes, ponds, glaciers > 1 km^{2} (0.386 sq mi or 247 acres) and river estuaries.

Saint-Grégoire (French pronunciation: [sɛ̃ ɡʁeɡwaʁ]; Breton: Sant-Gregor; Gallo: Saent-Gregoèrr) is a commune in the department of Ille-et-Vilaine, Brittany, northwestern France.

== Population ==
Inhabitants of Saint-Grégoire are called grégoriens in French.

The city hosts offices of important firms such as KPMG, or the "Banque Populaire Grand Ouest" and other well-known firms.

Historical population
Year	Pop.	±% p.a.
1968	2,086	—
1975	2,461	+2.39%
1982	3,856	+6.63%
1990	5,816	+5.27%
1999	7,644	+3.08%
2007	8,225	+0.92%
2012	8,783	+1.32%
2017	9,639	+1.88%
2023	9,957	+0.54%
Source: INSEE

== See also ==
- Communes of the Ille-et-Vilaine department
