= Mordelles =

Mordelles Mordell (Gallo) Morzhel (Breton)
- Commune
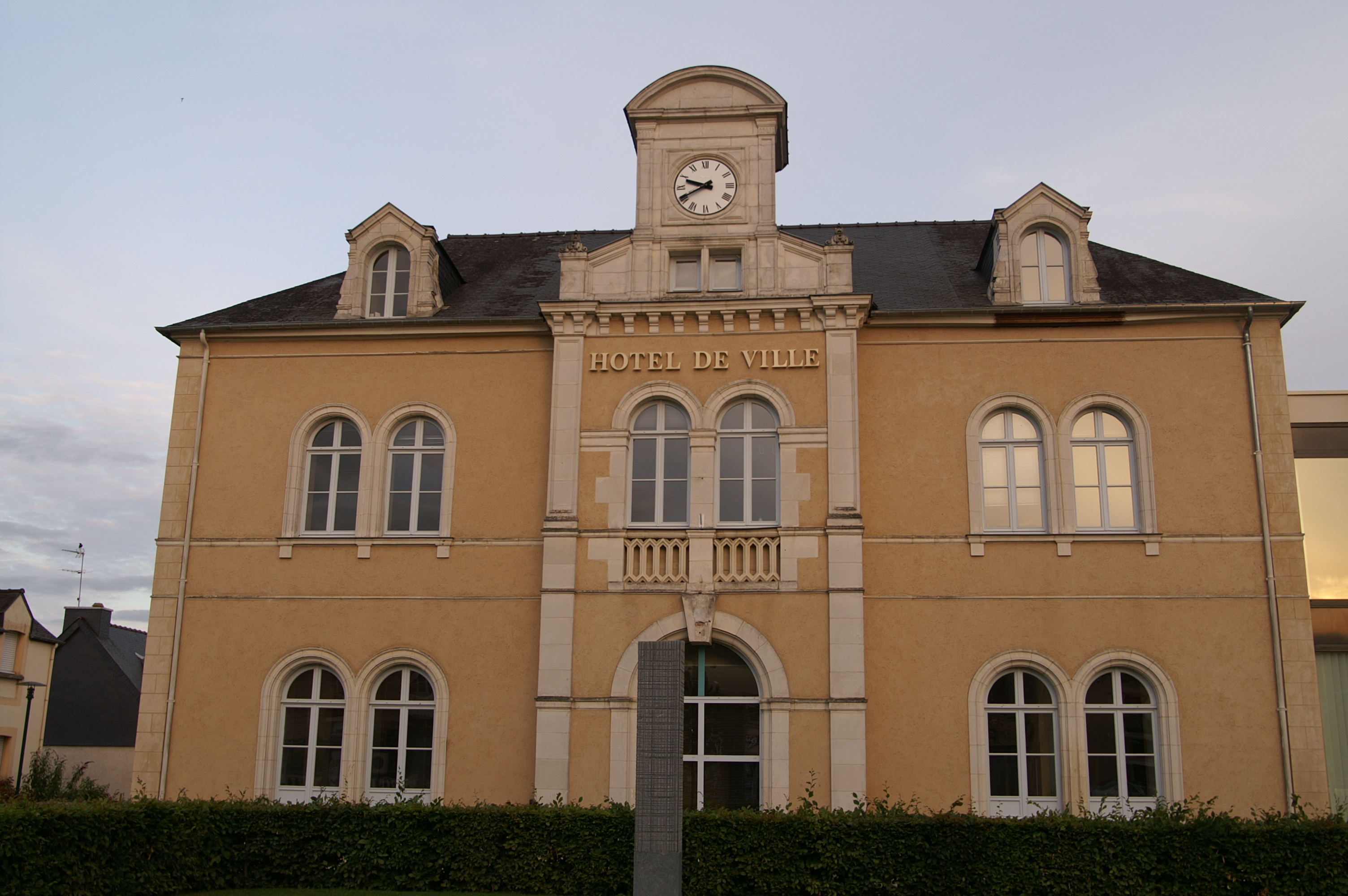
- Town hall

- Flag Coat of arms
- Location of Mordelles
- Location within France Location within Brittany
- Coordinates: 48°04′32″N 1°50′41″W
- Country: France
- Region: Brittany
- Department: Ille-et-Vilaine
- Arrondissement: Rennes
- Canton: Le Rheu
- Intercommunality: Rennes Métropole

Government
  - Mayor (2020–2026): Thierry Le Bihan
- Area^{1}: 29.84 km^{2} (11.52 sq mi)
- Highest elevation: 51 m (167 ft)
- Lowest elevation: 19 m (62 ft)
- Population (2023): 7,911
  - Density: 265.1/km^{2} (686.6/sq mi)
- Time zone: UTC+01:00 (CET)
  - Summer (DST): UTC+02:00 (CEST)
- INSEE/Postal code: 35196 /35310
- ^{1} French Land Register data, which excludes lakes, ponds, glaciers > 1 km^{2} (0.386 sq mi or 247 acres) and river estuaries.

Mordelles (French pronunciation: [mɔʁdɛl]; Breton: Morzhell; Gallo: Mordèll) is a commune in the Ille-et-Vilaine department of Brittany in northwestern France.

== Geography ==
The river Meu forms the commune's southwestern border.

== Population ==
Inhabitants of Mordelles are called in French Mordelais.

Historical population
Year	Pop.	±% p.a.
1968	2,920	—
1975	3,869	+4.10%
1982	5,146	+4.16%
1990	5,359	+0.51%
1999	5,898	+1.07%
2007	6,777	+1.75%
2012	7,247	+1.35%
2017	7,363	+0.32%
2023	7,911	+1.20%
Source: INSEE

== See also ==
- Communes of the Ille-et-Vilaine department
