= Ettinghausen, Germany =

Ettinghausen
- Municipality
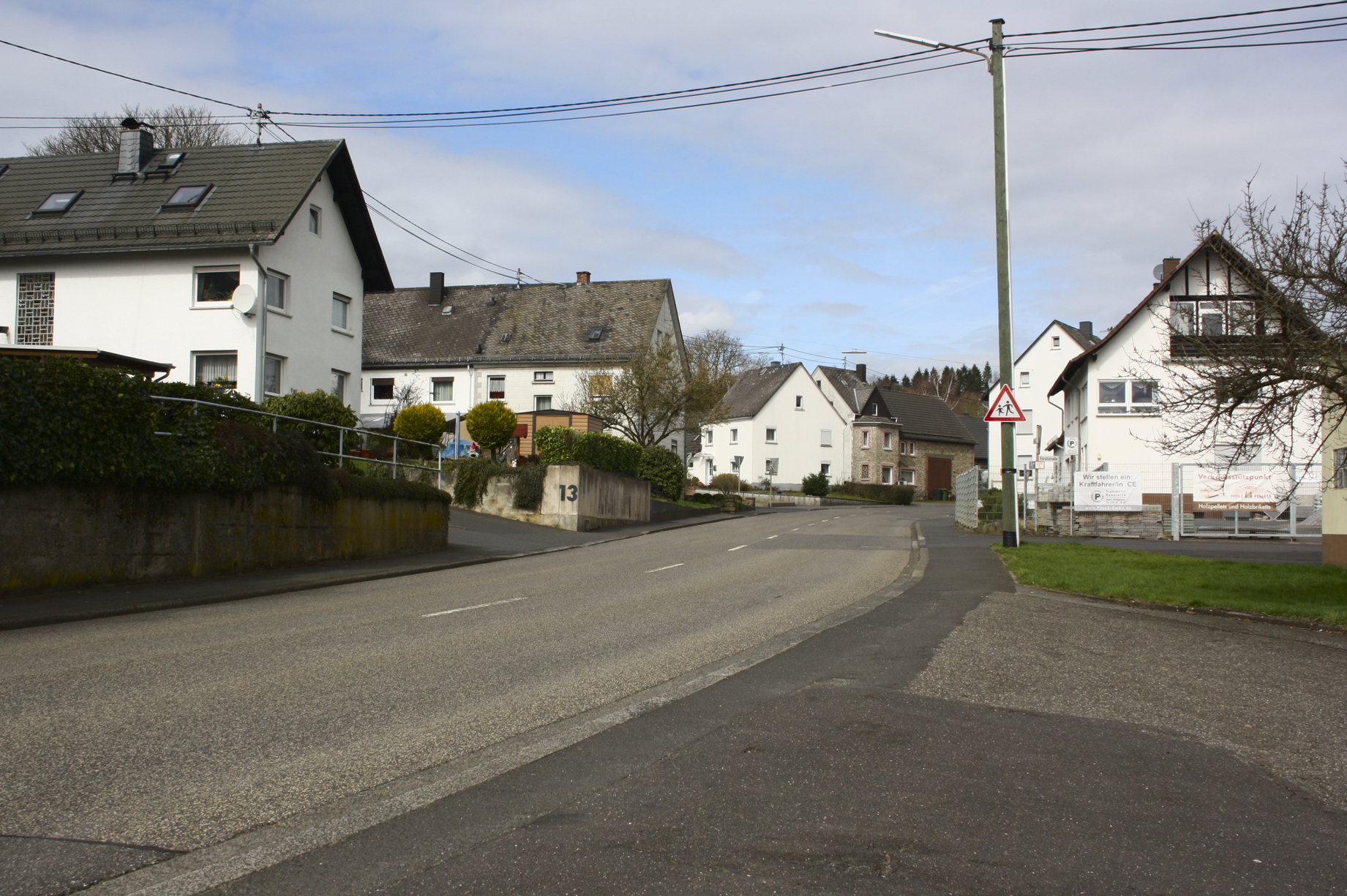

- Coat of arms

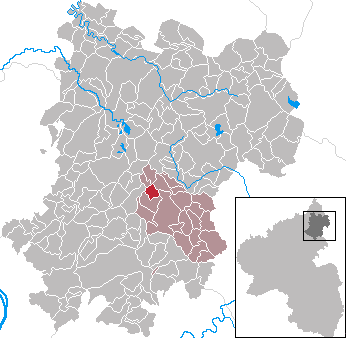
- Location of Ettinghausen within Westerwaldkreis district
- Interactive map of Ettinghausen
- Location within Germany Location within Rhineland-Palatinate
- Coordinates: 50°31′02″N 7°52′24″E
- Country: Germany
- State: Rhineland-Palatinate
- District: Westerwaldkreis
- Municipal assoc.: Wallmerod

Government
  - Mayor (2019–24): Dieter Püsch

Area
  - Total: 2.38 km^{2} (0.92 sq mi)
- Elevation: 401 m (1,316 ft)

Population (2025-12-31)
  - Total: 333
  - Density: 140/km^{2} (362/sq mi)
- Time zone: UTC+01:00 (CET)
  - Summer (DST): UTC+02:00 (CEST)
- Postal codes: 56244
- Dialling codes: 06435
- Vehicle registration: WW
- Website: www.wallmerod.de

Ettinghausen is an Ortsgemeinde – a municipality belonging to a Verbandsgemeinde – in the Westerwaldkreis in Rhineland-Palatinate, Germany.

== Geography ==
The municipality lies in the Westerwald between Montabaur and Hachenburg. The municipality belongs to the Verbandsgemeinde of Wallmerod, a kind of collective municipality.

== History ==
In 1367, Ettinghausen had its first recorded mention, as Ittincusen.

== Politics ==
The municipal council is made up of 8 council members who were elected in a majority vote in a municipal election on 7 June 2009.

== Economy and infrastructure ==
Ettinghausen is served by the local busses.of the lines 477, 480 and 959 and locsted in the area of the transport association Verkehrsverbund Rhein-Mosel (VRM), in the fare zone number 424.

Running right through the municipality is Bundesstraße 255 linking Montabaur and Herborn. The nearest Autobahn interchange is Montabaur on the A 3 (Cologne–Frankfurt), some 10 km away. The nearest InterCityExpress stop is the railway station at Montabaur on the Cologne-Frankfurt high-speed rail line.

There's a wind farm located on the area of Ettinghausen, Arnshöfen and Hahn am See.
