= Canton of Le Rheu =

Coordinates: 48.10°N 1.80°W

- Canton
- Country: France
- Region: Brittany
- Department: Ille-et-Vilaine
- No. of communes: {{{nbcomm}}}
- Population (2023): 46,389
- INSEE code: 35 24

The canton of Le Rheu is an administrative division of the Ille-et-Vilaine department, in northwestern France. It was created at the French canton reorganisation which came into effect in March 2015. Its seat is in Le Rheu.

It consists of the following communes:

1. Bréal-sous-Montfort
2. La Chapelle-Thouarault
3. Chavagne
4. Cintré
5. L'Hermitage
6. Mordelles
7. Le Rheu
8. Le Verger
9. Vezin-le-Coquet
