= Montgermont =

Montgermont Monjèrmont (Gallo) Menezgervant (Breton)
- Commune
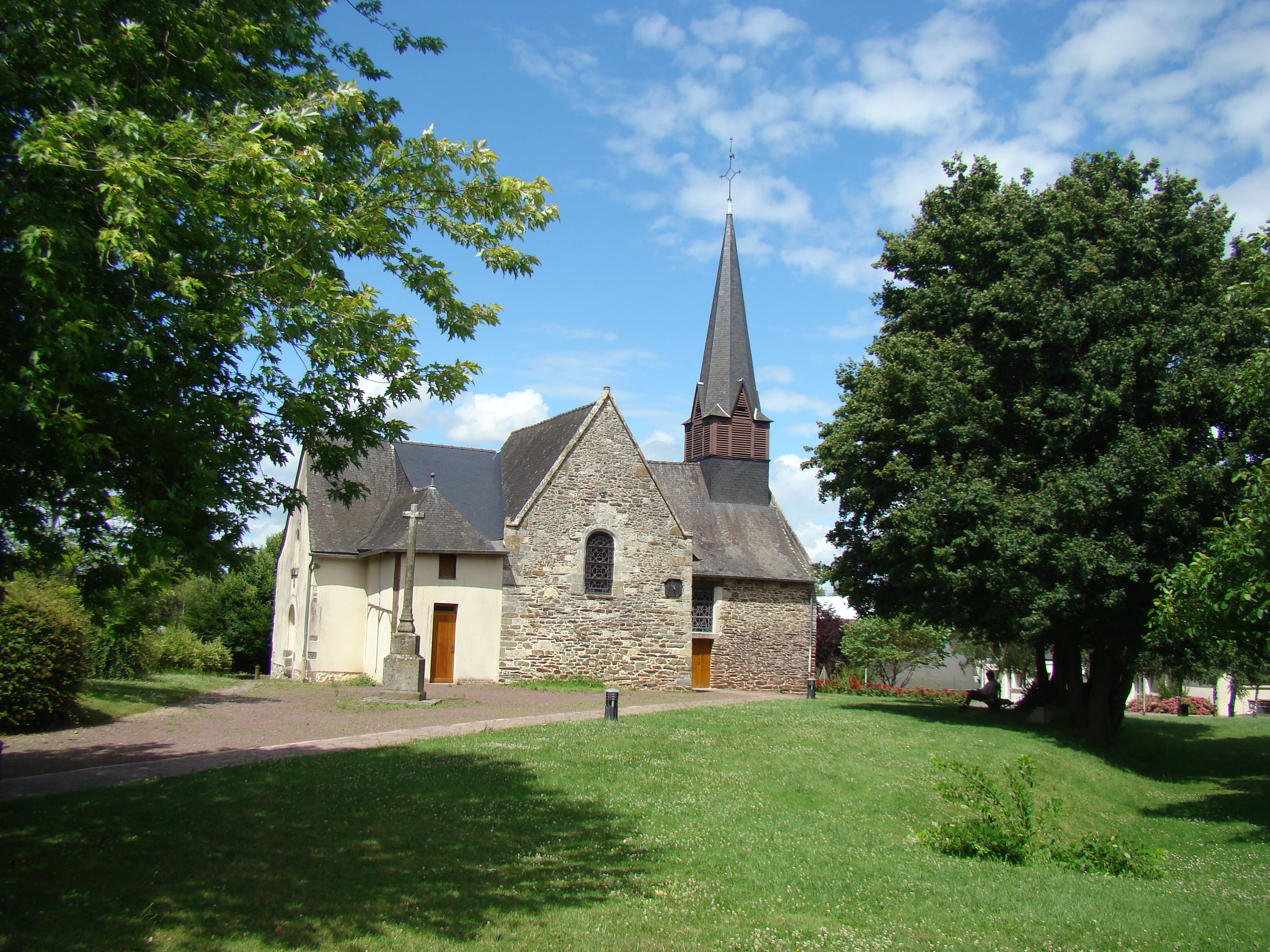
- The church of Montgermont

- Coat of arms
- Location of Montgermont
- Location within France Location within Brittany
- Coordinates: 48°09′27″N 1°42′54″W
- Country: France
- Region: Brittany
- Department: Ille-et-Vilaine
- Arrondissement: Rennes
- Canton: Betton
- Intercommunality: Rennes Métropole

Government
  - Mayor (2020–2026): Laurent Prize
- Area^{1}: 4.67 km^{2} (1.80 sq mi)
- Highest elevation: 62 m (203 ft)
- Lowest elevation: 34 m (112 ft)
- Population (2023): 3,827
  - Density: 819/km^{2} (2,120/sq mi)
- Time zone: UTC+01:00 (CET)
  - Summer (DST): UTC+02:00 (CEST)
- INSEE/Postal code: 35189 /35760
- ^{1} French Land Register data, which excludes lakes, ponds, glaciers > 1 km^{2} (0.386 sq mi or 247 acres) and river estuaries.

Montgermont (French pronunciation: [mɔ̃ʒɛʁmɔ̃]; Breton: Menezgervant, Gallo: Monjèrmont) is a commune in the Ille-et-Vilaine department of Brittany in northwestern France.

== Population ==
Inhabitants of Montgermont are called in French Montgermontais.

Historical population
Year	Pop.	±% p.a.
1968	606	—
1975	1,099	+8.88%
1982	1,976	+8.74%
1990	2,395	+2.43%
1999	2,758	+1.58%
2007	3,085	+1.41%
2012	3,218	+0.85%
2017	3,364	+0.89%
2023	3,827	+2.17%
Source: INSEE

== See also ==
- Communes of the Ille-et-Vilaine department
