= Le Rheu =

Le Rheu Reuz (Breton)
- Commune
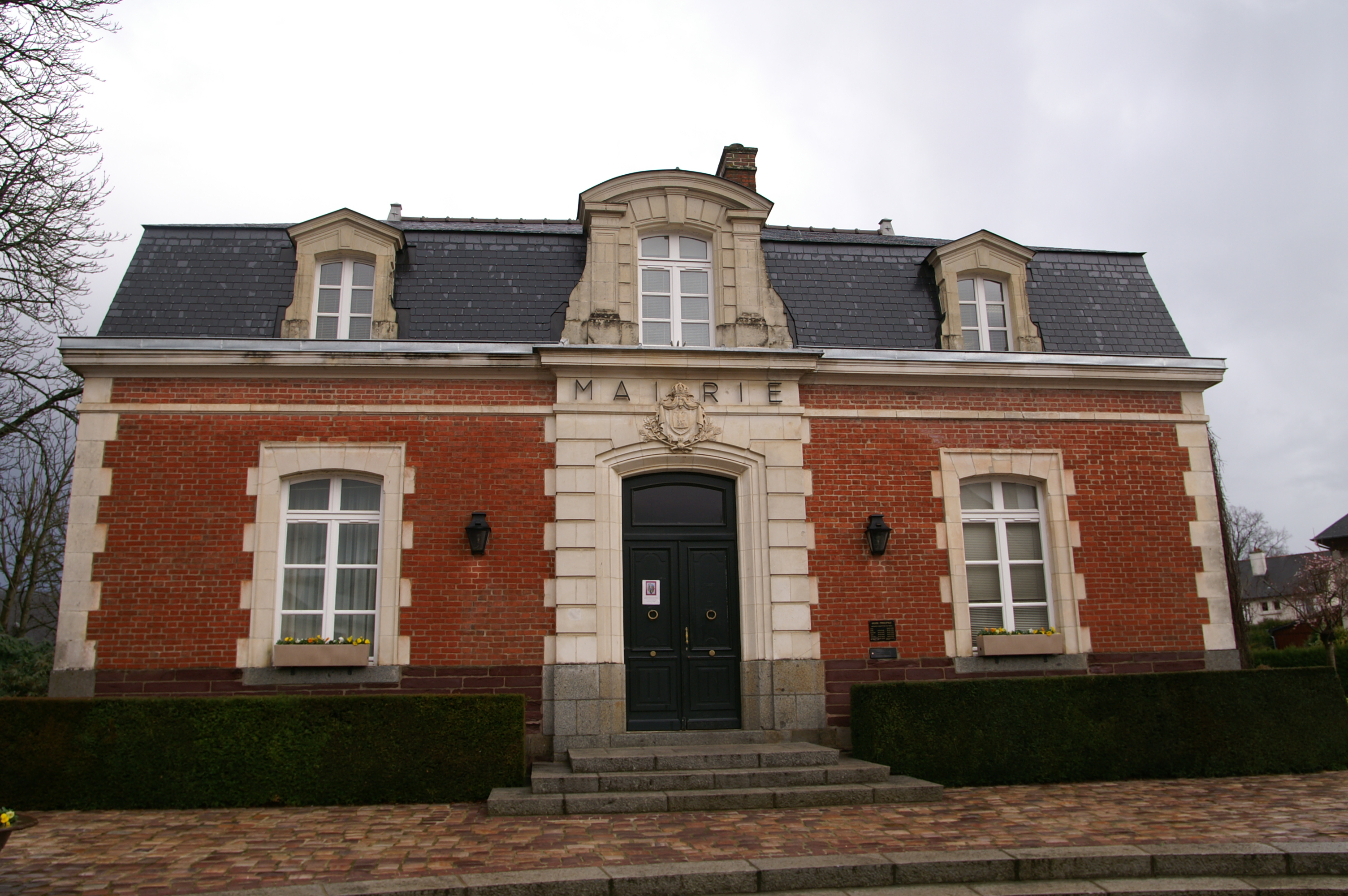
- Town hall

- Coat of arms
- Location of Le Rheu
- Location within France Location within Brittany
- Coordinates: 48°06′10″N 1°47′39″W
- Country: France
- Region: Brittany
- Department: Ille-et-Vilaine
- Arrondissement: Rennes
- Canton: Le Rheu
- Intercommunality: Rennes Métropole

Government
  - Mayor (2022–2026): Chantal Pétard-Voisin
- Area^{1}: 18.89 km^{2} (7.29 sq mi)
- Highest elevation: 48 m (157 ft)
- Lowest elevation: 18 m (59 ft)
- Population (2023): 9,839
  - Density: 520.9/km^{2} (1,349/sq mi)
- Time zone: UTC+01:00 (CET)
  - Summer (DST): UTC+02:00 (CEST)
- INSEE/Postal code: 35240 /35650
- ^{1} French Land Register data, which excludes lakes, ponds, glaciers > 1 km^{2} (0.386 sq mi or 247 acres) and river estuaries.

Le Rheu (French pronunciation: [lə ʁø]; Breton: Reuz) is a commune in the Ille-et-Vilaine department in Brittany in northwestern France.

== Population ==
Inhabitants of Le Rheu are called rheusois in French.

Historical population
Year	Pop.	±% p.a.
1968	3,080	—
1975	3,869	+3.31%
1982	4,276	+1.44%
1990	5,027	+2.04%
1999	5,733	+1.47%
2007	7,212	+2.91%
2012	7,788	+1.55%
2017	8,740	+2.33%
2023	9,839	+1.99%
Source: INSEE

== See also ==
- Communes of the Ille-et-Vilaine department
