= Hahn am See =

- Municipality
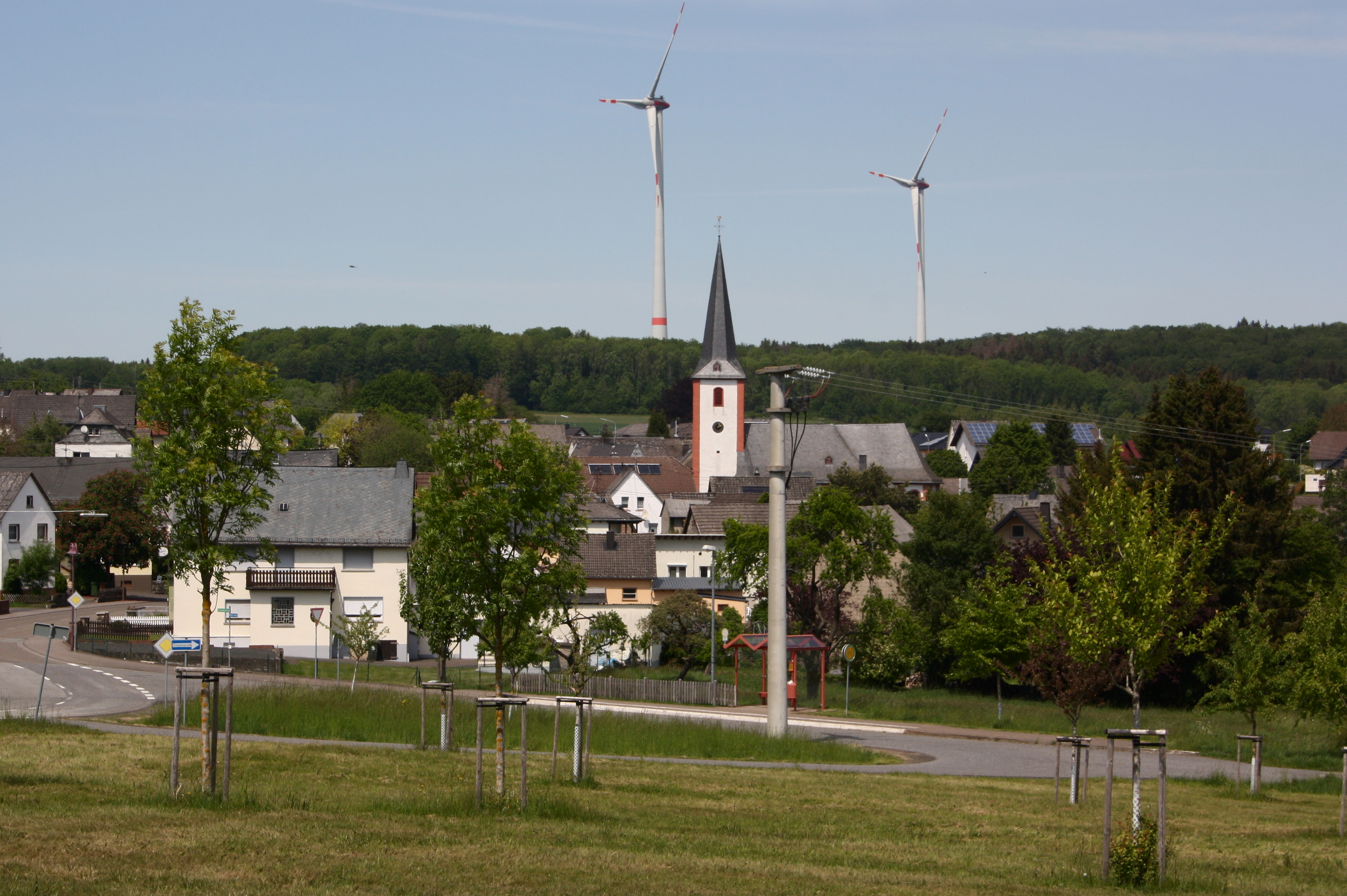

- Coat of arms

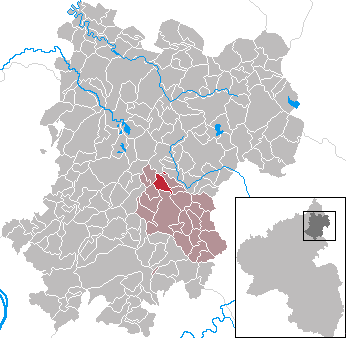
- Location of Hahn am See within Westerwaldkreis district
- Interactive map of Hahn am See
- Location within Germany Location within Rhineland-Palatinate
- Coordinates: 50°31′28″N 7°53′34″E
- Country: Germany
- State: Rhineland-Palatinate
- District: Westerwaldkreis
- Municipal assoc.: Wallmerod
- Subdivisions: 2

Government
  - Mayor (2019–24): Doris Frink

Area
  - Total: 3.69 km^{2} (1.42 sq mi)
- Elevation: 399 m (1,309 ft)

Population (2025-12-31)
  - Total: 417
  - Density: 113/km^{2} (293/sq mi)
- Time zone: UTC+01:00 (CET)
  - Summer (DST): UTC+02:00 (CEST)
- Postal codes: 56244
- Dialling codes: 06435
- Vehicle registration: WW
- Website: http://www.wallmerod.de

Hahn am See is an Ortsgemeinde – a community belonging to a Verbandsgemeinde – in the Westerwaldkreis in Rhineland-Palatinate, Germany.

== Geography ==
The community lies in the Westerwald between Montabaur und Hachenburg. The community belongs to the Verbandsgemeinde of Wallmerod, a kind of collective municipality.

== History ==
Hahn am See, which was mentioned in a document as Hane as early as 1374, lies on one of Germany's oldest roads. The Hohe Straße (“High Road”), which is now Bundesstraße 8, can be traced back to the Völkerwanderung in pre-Christian times. When there was a great water shortage in 1870, a fountain to supply people with water, was built which was fed by a natural spring. The old fountain column still stands today and still gives its cooling wetness.

=== Amalgamations ===
With the amalgamation of the communities of Hahn and Niederhahn, the new united community was given the name Hahn am See in 1980.

== Politics ==
=== Community council ===
The council is made up of 8 council members who were elected in a majority vote in a municipal election on 7 June 2009.

=== Town partnerships ===
There is a partnership arrangement with the French community of Le Verger, which is nurtured by a promotional group.

== Culture and sightseeing ==
The community's core is characterized by the village linden tree, which is more than 100 years old, and the Baroque church from 1726, which is a protected monument.

== Infrastructure ==
The local bus line 477 runs from Rehe via Rennerod, Westerburg and Hahn to Montabaur. Hahn is located in zone number 424 of the transport association Verkehrsverbund Rhein-Mosel (VRM).

There is a wind farm for energy production in the area of the villages Ettinghausen, Arnshöfen and Hahn am See.
