= Betton, Ille-et-Vilaine =

Betton Beton (Gallo) Lanvezhon (Breton)
- Commune
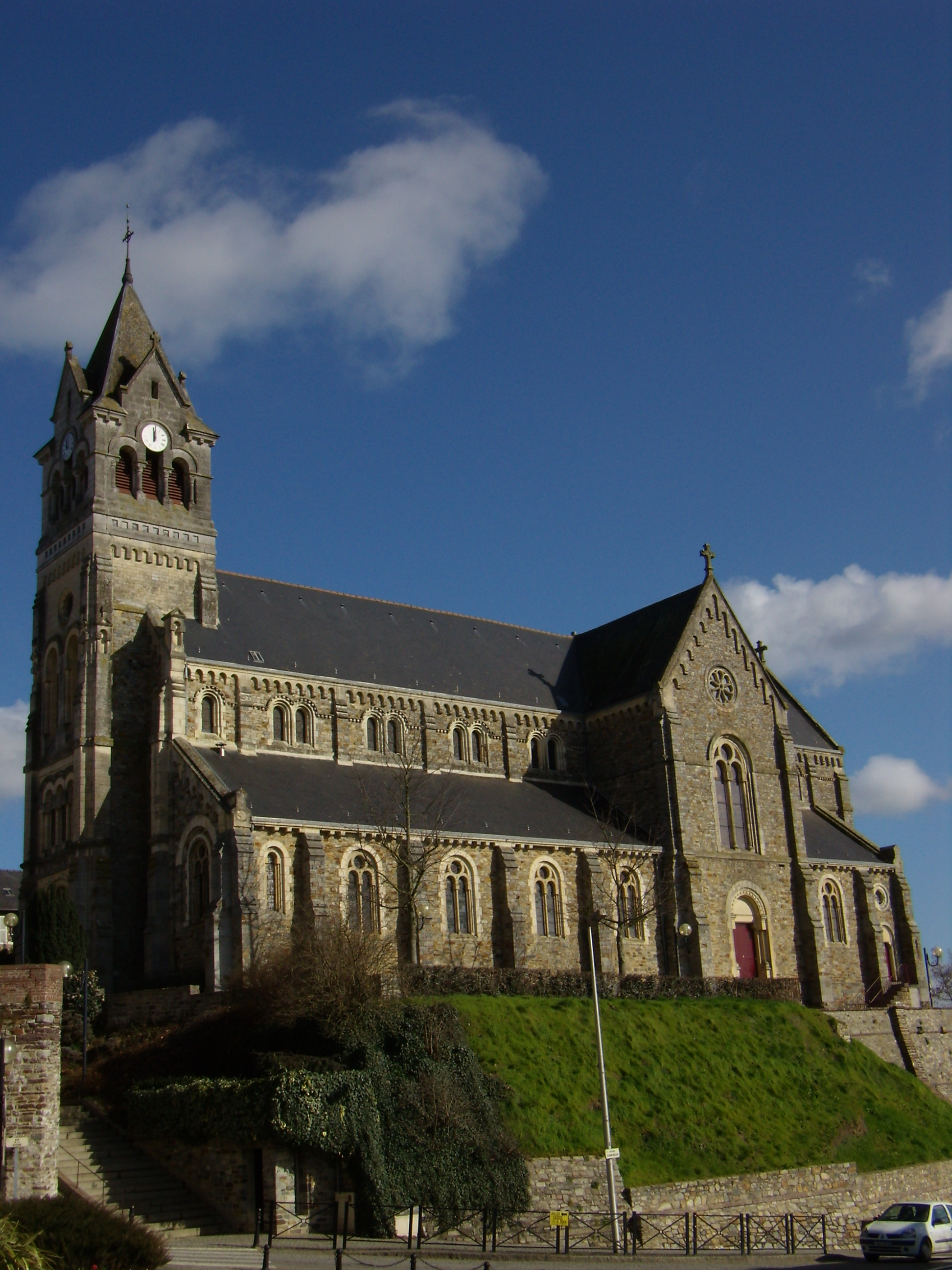
- Saint Martin church

- Coat of arms
- Location of Betton
- Location within France Location within Brittany
- Coordinates: 48°11′00″N 1°38′34″W
- Country: France
- Region: Brittany
- Department: Ille-et-Vilaine
- Arrondissement: Rennes
- Canton: Betton
- Intercommunality: Rennes Métropole

Government
  - Mayor (2020–2026): Laurence Besserve
- Area^{1}: 26.73 km^{2} (10.32 sq mi)
- Highest elevation: 90 m (300 ft)
- Lowest elevation: 27 m (89 ft)
- Population (2023): 12,964
  - Density: 485.0/km^{2} (1,256/sq mi)
- Time zone: UTC+01:00 (CET)
  - Summer (DST): UTC+02:00 (CEST)
- INSEE/Postal code: 35024 /35830
- ^{1} French Land Register data, which excludes lakes, ponds, glaciers > 1 km^{2} (0.386 sq mi or 247 acres) and river estuaries.

Betton (French pronunciation: [bɛtɔ̃]; Breton: Lanvezhon; Gallo: Beton) is a commune in the Ille-et-Vilaine department in Brittany in northwestern France. It is nine kilometers north of the centre of Rennes.

== Population ==
Inhabitants of Betton are called Bettonnais in French.

Historical population

Year	Pop.	±% p.a.
1793	1,804	—
1800	1,996	+1.46%
1806	1,955	−0.35%
1821	2,008	+0.18%
1831	2,021	+0.06%
1836	1,860	−1.65%
1841	1,800	−0.65%
1846	1,936	+1.47%
1851	2,012	+0.77%
1856	2,022	+0.10%
1861	2,008	−0.14%
1866	2,037	+0.29%
1872	2,038	+0.01%
1876	2,145	+1.29%
1881	2,106	−0.37%
1886	2,123	+0.16%
1891	2,184	+0.57%
1896	2,161	−0.21%
1901	2,111	−0.47%

Year	Pop.	±% p.a.
1906	2,068	−0.41%
1911	1,923	−1.44%
1921	1,810	−0.60%
1926	1,800	−0.11%
1931	1,772	−0.31%
1936	1,708	−0.73%
1946	1,830	+0.69%
1954	1,907	+0.52%
1962	2,048	+0.90%
1968	2,475	+3.21%
1975	4,870	+10.15%
1982	5,907	+2.80%
1990	7,013	+2.17%
1999	8,547	+2.22%
2007	9,643	+1.52%
2012	10,292	+1.31%
2017	11,735	+2.66%
2023	12,964	+1.67%

Source: EHESS and INSEE

== See also ==
- Communes of the Ille-et-Vilaine department
