= Le Verger =

Le Verger Gwerzher (Breton)
- Commune
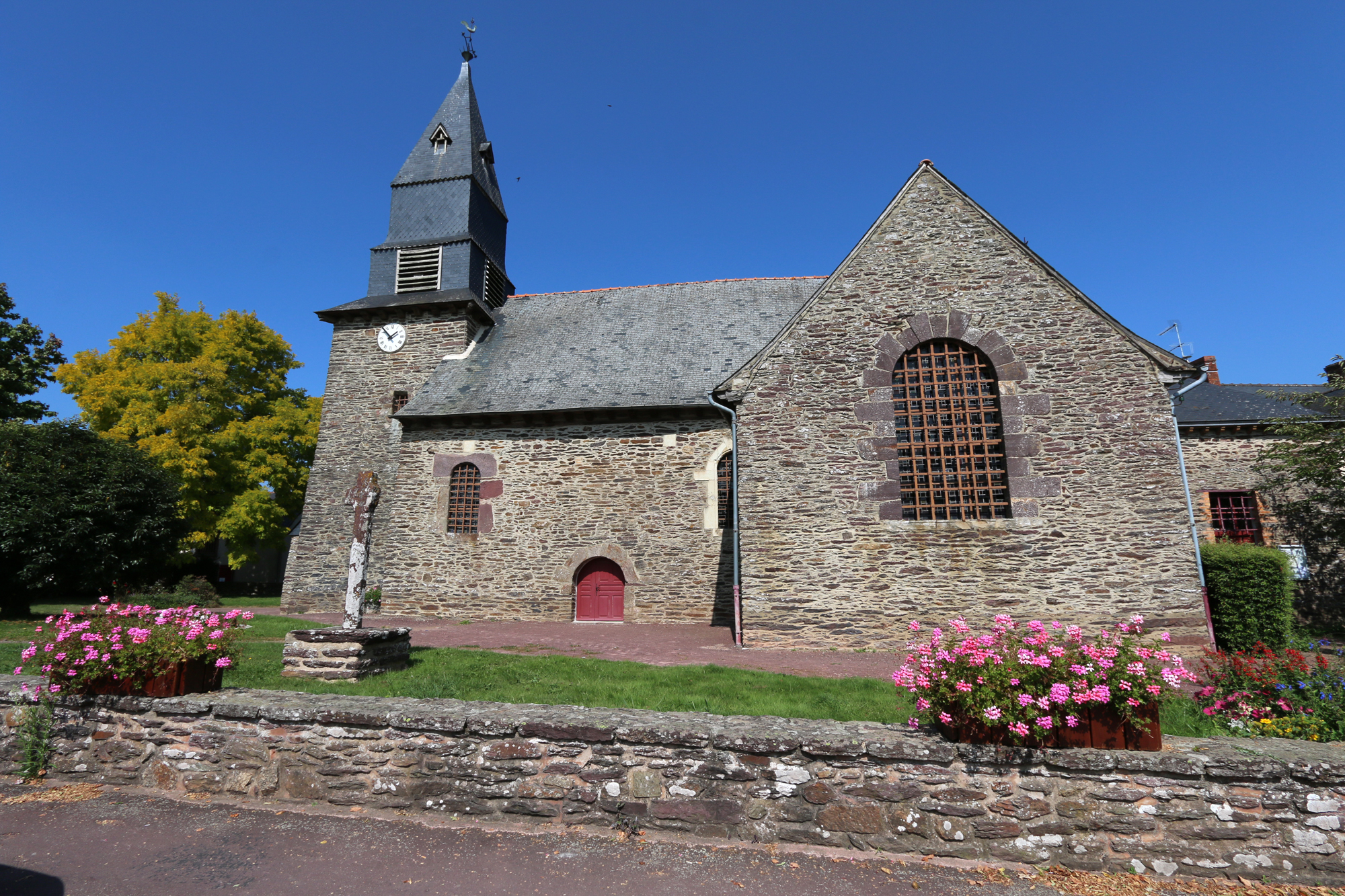
- The church in Le Verger
- Location of Le Verger
- Location within France Location within Brittany
- Coordinates: 48°04′13″N 1°55′55″W
- Country: France
- Region: Brittany
- Department: Ille-et-Vilaine
- Arrondissement: Rennes
- Canton: Le Rheu
- Intercommunality: Rennes Métropole

Government
  - Mayor (2020–2026): Sylvie Galic
- Area^{1}: 6.87 km^{2} (2.65 sq mi)
- Highest elevation: 92 m (302 ft)
- Lowest elevation: 29 m (95 ft)
- Population (2023): 1,389
  - Density: 202/km^{2} (524/sq mi)
- Time zone: UTC+01:00 (CET)
  - Summer (DST): UTC+02:00 (CEST)
- INSEE/Postal code: 35351 /35160
- ^{1} French Land Register data, which excludes lakes, ponds, glaciers > 1 km^{2} (0.386 sq mi or 247 acres) and river estuaries.

Le Verger (French pronunciation: [lə vɛʁʒe]; Breton: Gwerzher) is a commune in the Ille-et-Vilaine department of Brittany in northwestern France.

== Population ==
Inhabitants of Le Verger are called Vergéens in French.

Historical population
Year	Pop.	±% p.a.
1968	395	—
1975	653	+7.45%
1982	722	+1.45%
1990	915	+3.01%
1999	1,099	+2.06%
2007	1,459	+3.61%
2012	1,476	+0.23%
2017	1,445	−0.42%
2023	1,389	−0.66%
Source: INSEE

== International relations ==
There is a partnership arrangement with the German community of Hahn am See.

== See also ==
- Communes of the Ille-et-Vilaine department
