= La Chapelle-Thouarault =

La Chapelle-Thouarault Bredual (Breton)
- Commune
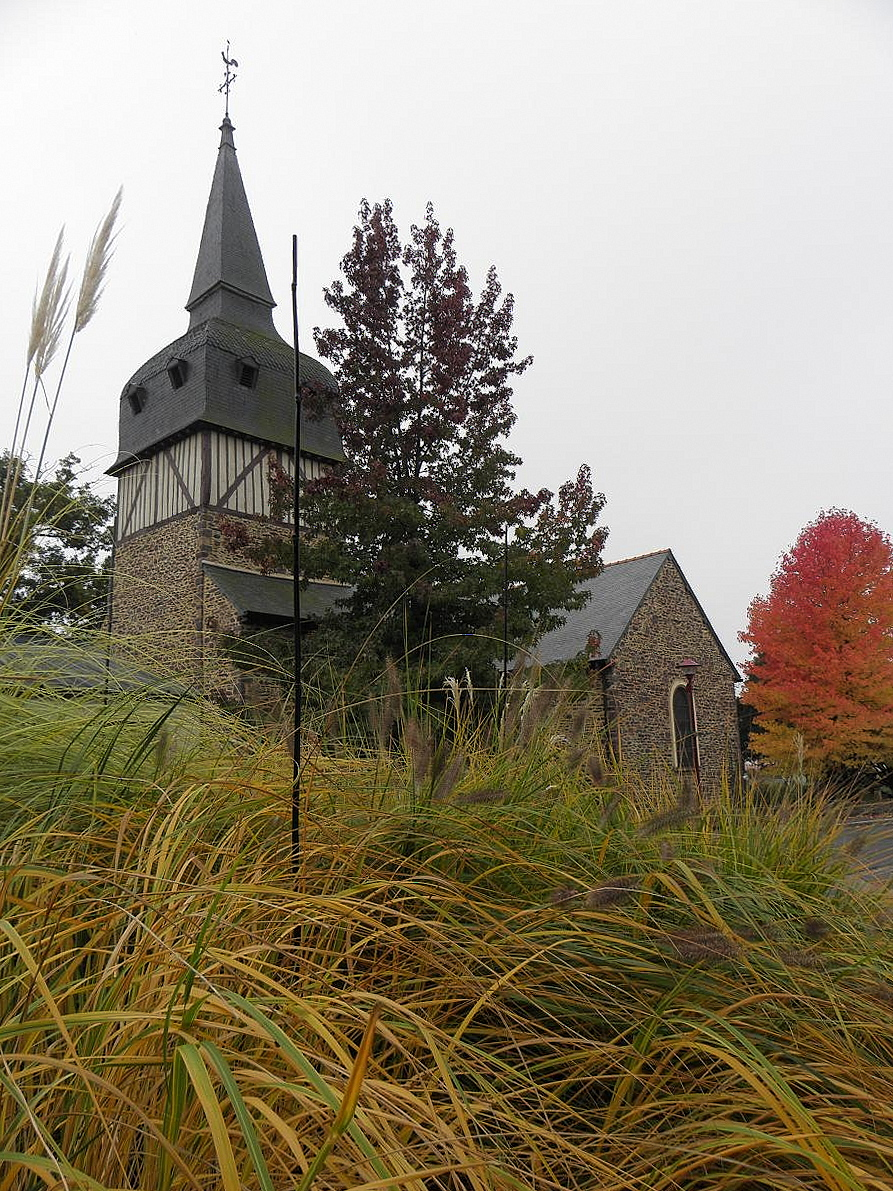
- The parish church of Notre-Dame-de-Montual

- Coat of arms
- Location of La Chapelle-Thouarault
- Location within France Location within Brittany
- Coordinates: 48°07′30″N 1°51′50″W
- Country: France
- Region: Brittany
- Department: Ille-et-Vilaine
- Arrondissement: Rennes
- Canton: Le Rheu
- Intercommunality: Rennes Métropole

Government
  - Mayor (2020–2026): Régine Armand
- Area^{1}: 7.64 km^{2} (2.95 sq mi)
- Highest elevation: 64 m (210 ft)
- Lowest elevation: 28 m (92 ft)
- Population (2023): 2,304
  - Density: 302/km^{2} (781/sq mi)
- Time zone: UTC+01:00 (CET)
  - Summer (DST): UTC+02:00 (CEST)
- INSEE/Postal code: 35065 /35590
- ^{1} French Land Register data, which excludes lakes, ponds, glaciers > 1 km^{2} (0.386 sq mi or 247 acres) and river estuaries.

La Chapelle-Thouarault (French pronunciation: [la ʃapɛl twaʁo]; Breton: Bredual) is a commune in the Ille-et-Vilaine department of Brittany in north-western France.

== Population ==
Historical population

Year	Pop.	±% p.a.
1793	499	—
1821	594	+0.62%
1846	591	−0.02%
1872	577	−0.09%
1901	549	−0.17%
1926	501	−0.37%
1946	458	−0.45%
1962	419	−0.55%
1968	451	+1.23%

Year	Pop.	±% p.a.
1975	792	+8.38%
1982	1,566	+10.23%
1990	1,975	+2.94%
1999	1,915	−0.34%
2007	1,942	+0.18%
2012	1,882	−0.63%
2017	2,170	+2.89%
2023	2,304	+1.00%

Source: EHESS and INSEE (1968-2023)

== See also ==
- Communes of the Ille-et-Vilaine department
