= Cesson-Sévigné =

Cesson-Sévigné Séson / Seczon-Sevinyaé (Gallo) Saozon-Sevigneg (Breton)
- Commune
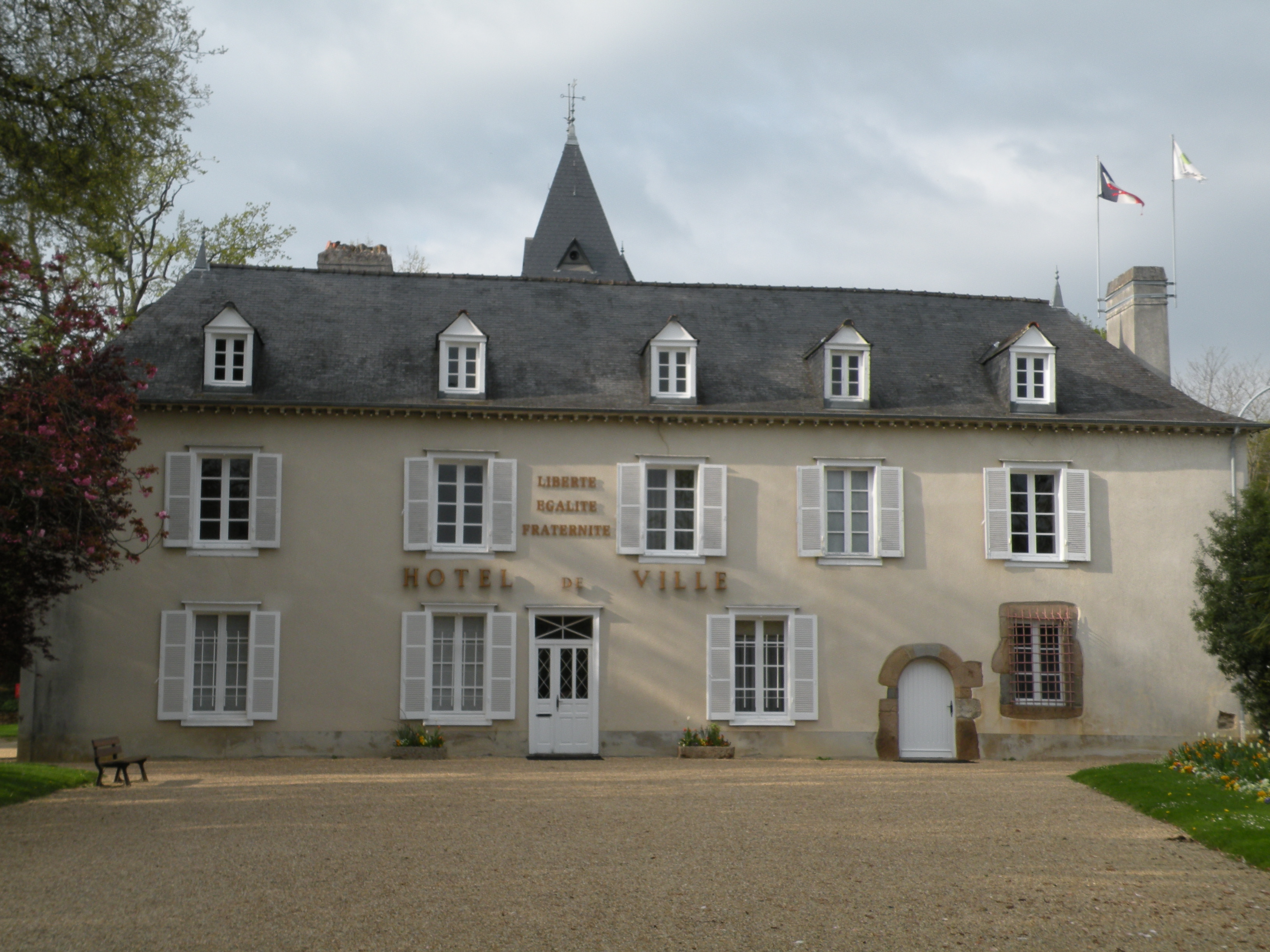
- Town hall

- Flag Coat of arms
- Location of Cesson-Sévigné
- Location within France Location within Brittany
- Coordinates: 48°07′18″N 1°36′09″W
- Country: France
- Region: Brittany
- Department: Ille-et-Vilaine
- Arrondissement: Rennes
- Canton: Betton
- Intercommunality: Rennes Métropole

Government
  - Mayor (2020–2026): Jean-Pierre Savignac
- Area^{1}: 32.14 km^{2} (12.41 sq mi)
- Elevation: 46 m (151 ft)
- Highest elevation: 82 m (269 ft)
- Lowest elevation: 27 m (89 ft)
- Population (2023): 18,761
  - Density: 583.7/km^{2} (1,512/sq mi)
- Time zone: UTC+01:00 (CET)
  - Summer (DST): UTC+02:00 (CEST)
- INSEE/Postal code: 35051 /35510
- ^{1} French Land Register data, which excludes lakes, ponds, glaciers > 1 km^{2} (0.386 sq mi or 247 acres) and river estuaries.

Cesson-Sévigné (French pronunciation: [sɛsɔ̃ seviɲe]; in Gallo: Séson or Seczon-Sevinyaé, Breton: Saozon-Sevigneg) is a commune in the Ille-et-Vilaine department in Brittany in northwestern France.

It is a suburb directly to the east of Rennes, bordered on its west side by the University of Rennes and the Technopole Atalante. It is primarily a residential area for the middle class. The south side is a mix of commercial and industrial areas, the largest to the east of Rennes. One of the French famous grande école Telecom Bretagne also known as ENST Bretagne has one of its campus here. This campus is renowned and reputed for its work in networking domain.

== Population ==
A small rural town in the early 1960s, the town grew quickly during the following decades. In 2023, it was the sixth most populous commune in the department after Rennes, Saint-Malo, Fougères, Bruz and Vitré. Inhabitants of Cesson-Sévigné are called Cessonnais and Cessonnaises in French.

Historical population
Year	Pop.	±% p.a.
1968	3,658	—
1975	6,424	+8.38%
1982	10,451	+7.20%
1990	12,708	+2.47%
1999	14,344	+1.35%
2007	15,261	+0.78%
2012	16,206	+1.21%
2017	17,526	+1.58%
2023	18,761	+1.14%
Source: INSEE

== Culture ==
The town has a large collection of sculpture by the French Romantic-Realist artist Jean Boucher, who was born there. A sculpture park extends from the Hotel de Ville, and a large statue commemorating Camille Desmoulins occupies a nearby junction. Other sculptures are present in the centre culturel, which also hosts a rolling program of exhibitions and other events.

The town is also graced by a wide variety of parks and gardens, especially the formal garden of the Manoir de Bourchevreuil, which is also open to the public. A large public space exists in the newtown area known as La Monniais.

The town won the Grand National Award in the Floral Towns competition in 2005 and the gold medal at the European "Entente Florale" in 1999.

== Sights ==
- The cultural centre.
- Bourgchevreuil Manor, in the centre of the town.
- The church.
- The Museum of Communications here Ferrié which opened in 2004 near the ESAT in the technology center of Rennes Atalante.
- Chalotais Manor.
- The course of the river Vilaine, formerly named "rue de la Mairie," is the main artery of the old Cesson. It is bordered by a set of simple houses or shops in stone, in an alignment giving a remarkable perspective view (beside the church).
- "Castle" (nineteenth century), manor house and barn of Fresnerie (sixteenth century).
- Church, built in 1902.
- The Gaudaie Manor.
- Castle Cucé, historic monument with perimeter protection; it is beyond the Menouriais, on the border with Chantepie.
- The natural site of the Vilaine and old bridges. Facing the Calvaire, there is a fourth bridge, smaller and obscured by an embankment in recent years.
- The site of the park and La Monniais with its grand house in the English style, nicknamed the castle, and farther along the road, the old manor. This site has served as a stone quarry.
- The Dézerseul ponds, a nature reserve created by the town in 1973 for recreation and leisure, composed of 40 hectares.
- The port of Cesson, leaving over the Vilaine, at the intersection with the Rue de Rennes, which it faces. Its heyday was at the beginning of the eighteenth century, with the transport of stone extracted from Cesson, for the reconstruction of Rennes.
- From Fresnerie (street and park) to the Vilaine, through the course of Vilaine, the walker can discover flying bats, pipistrelles and other birds. All these species, as well as their habitats, are protected. They nest in the stone walls and under the roof of the old houses, hunt around the trees and on the Vilaine.

== Sports ==
The local handball team, Cesson Rennes MHB plays in the top French Division as of 2026.

== International relations ==
The commune is twinned with:

- Waltrop, Germany since 1984
- (Republic of Ireland) Carrick-on-Shannon, Ireland
- Dan-Kassari, Niger

== See also ==
- Communes of the Ille-et-Vilaine department

== Gallery ==
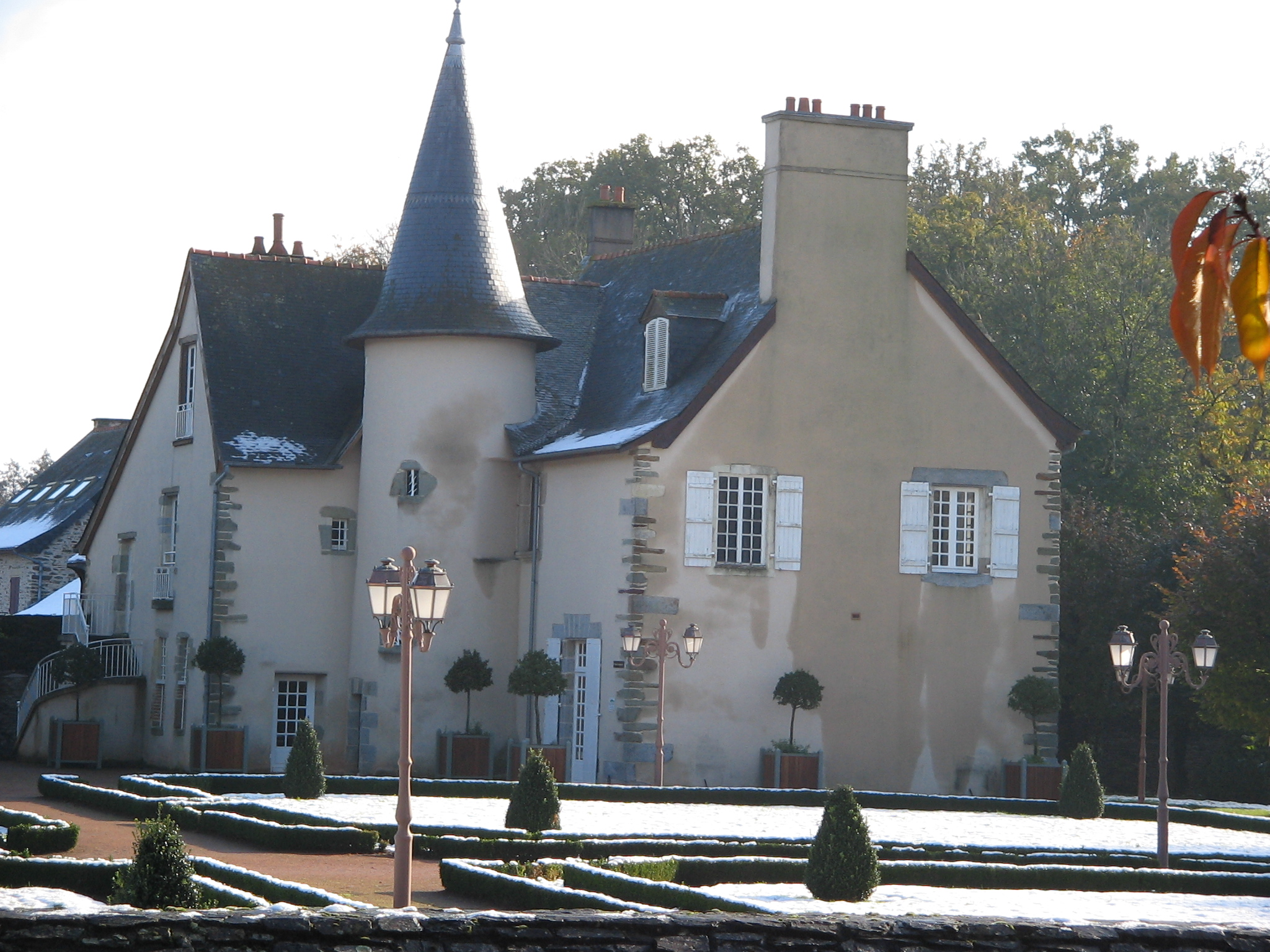
The Manoir de Bourchevreuil, an ancient building now located in downtown

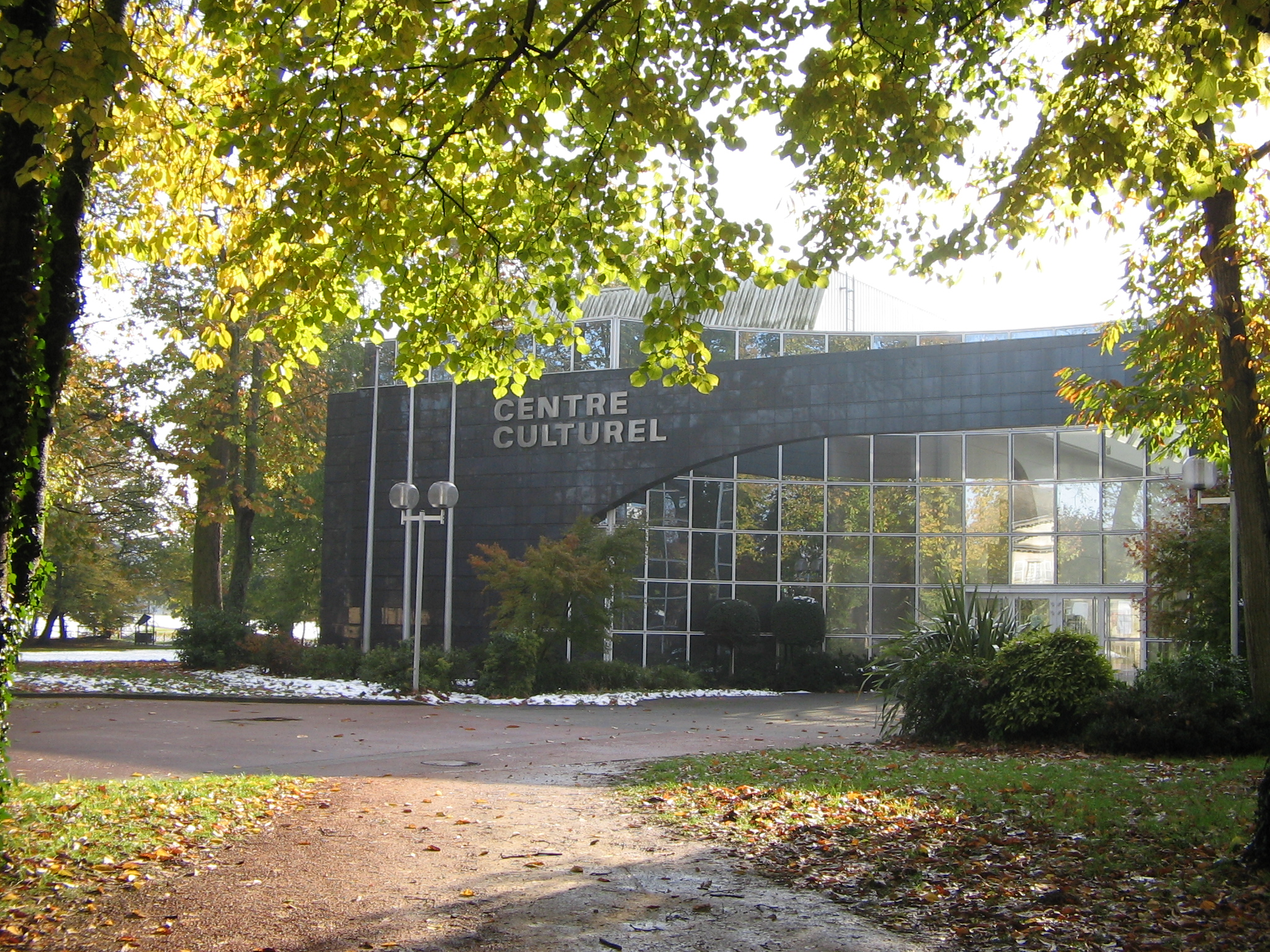
The cultural center

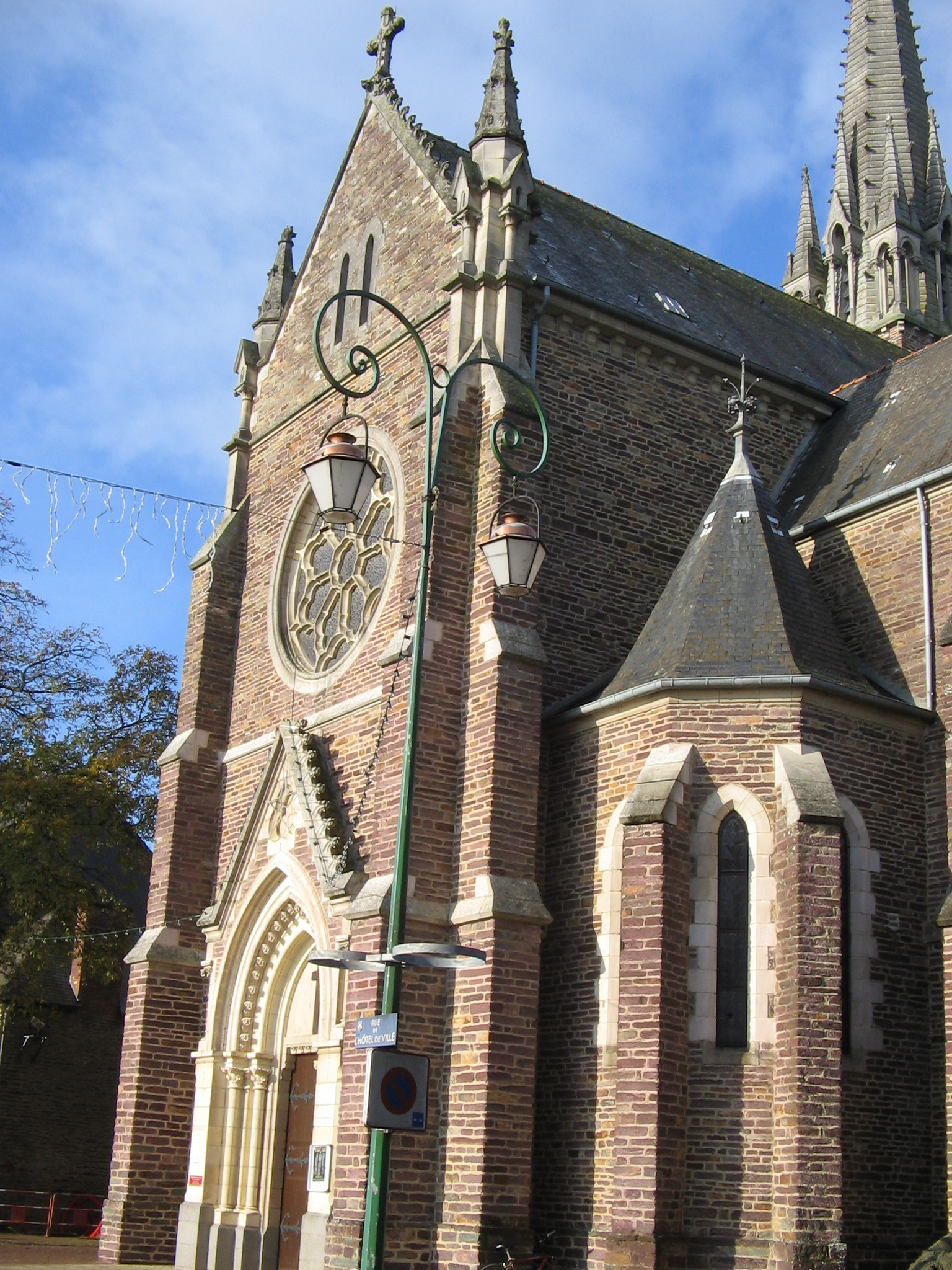
Saint-Martin de Cesson-Sévigné church
