= La Chapelle-des-Fougeretz =

La Chapelle-des-Fougeretz La Chapèll-dez-Foujerà (Gallo) Chapel-Felgeriz (Breton)
- Commune
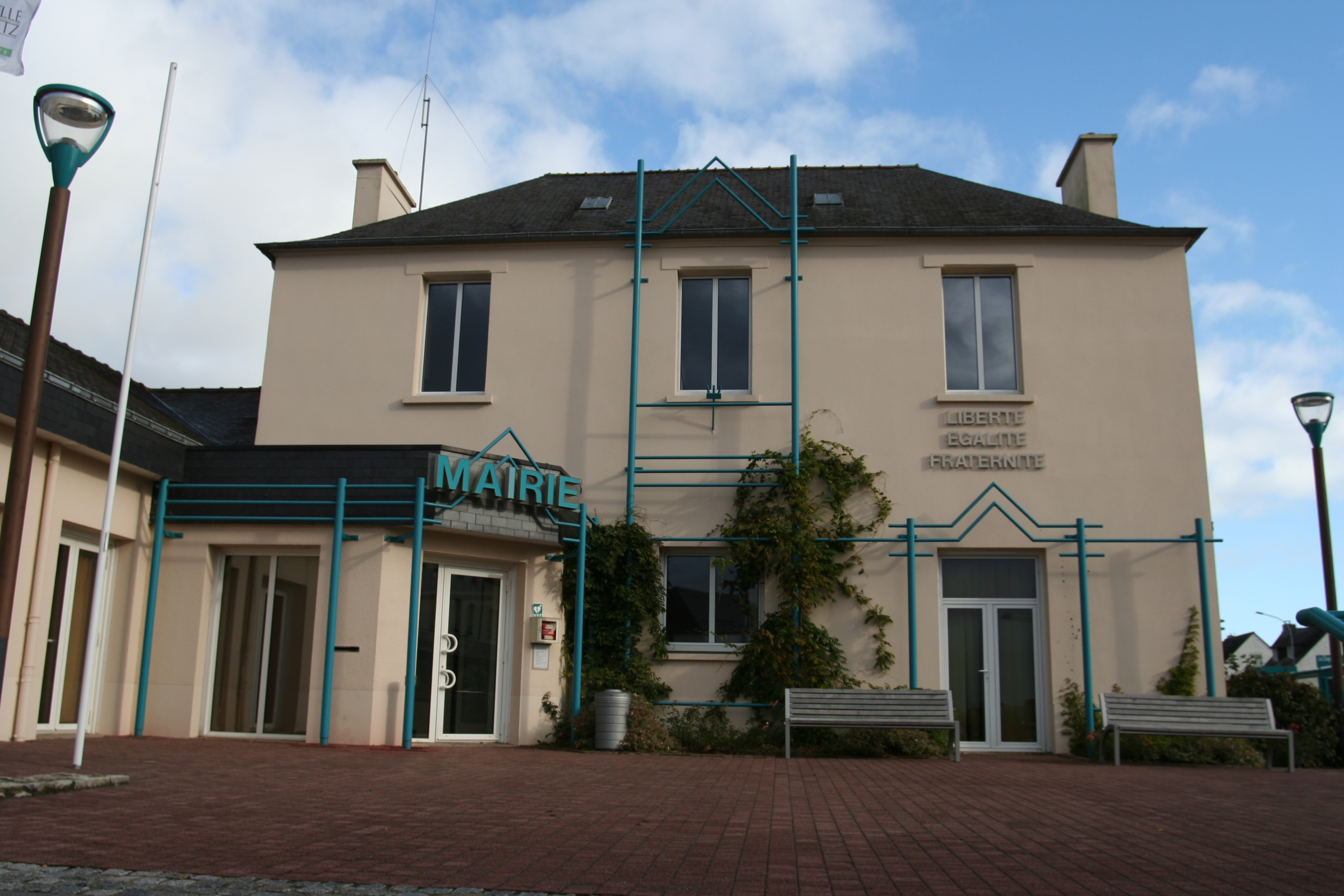
- Town hall

- Coat of arms
- Location of La Chapelle-des-Fougeretz
- Location within France Location within Brittany
- Coordinates: 48°10′41″N 1°43′54″W
- Country: France
- Region: Brittany
- Department: Ille-et-Vilaine
- Arrondissement: Rennes
- Canton: Betton
- Intercommunality: Rennes Métropole

Government
  - Mayor (2022–2026): Christèle Gasté
- Area^{1}: 8.71 km^{2} (3.36 sq mi)
- Highest elevation: 95 m (312 ft)
- Lowest elevation: 41 m (135 ft)
- Population (2023): 4,738
  - Density: 544/km^{2} (1,410/sq mi)
- Time zone: UTC+01:00 (CET)
  - Summer (DST): UTC+02:00 (CEST)
- INSEE/Postal code: 35059 /35520
- ^{1} French Land Register data, which excludes lakes, ponds, glaciers > 1 km^{2} (0.386 sq mi or 247 acres) and river estuaries.

La Chapelle-des-Fougeretz (French pronunciation: [la ʃapɛl de fuʒʁɛ]; Gallo: La Chapèll-dez-Foujerà, Breton: Chapel-Felgeriz) is a commune in the Ille-et-Vilaine department of Brittany in north-western France.

== Population ==
Inhabitants of La Chapelle-des-Fougeretz are called in French chapellois.

Historical population
Year	Pop.	±% p.a.
1968	644	—
1975	1,077	+7.62%
1982	1,791	+7.54%
1990	2,513	+4.32%
1999	3,306	+3.09%
2007	3,581	+1.00%
2012	4,627	+5.26%
2017	4,773	+0.62%
2023	4,738	−0.12%
Source: INSEE

== See also ==
- Communes of the Ille-et-Vilaine department
