= Cintré =

Cintré Ceintraé (Gallo) Kentreg (Breton)
- Commune
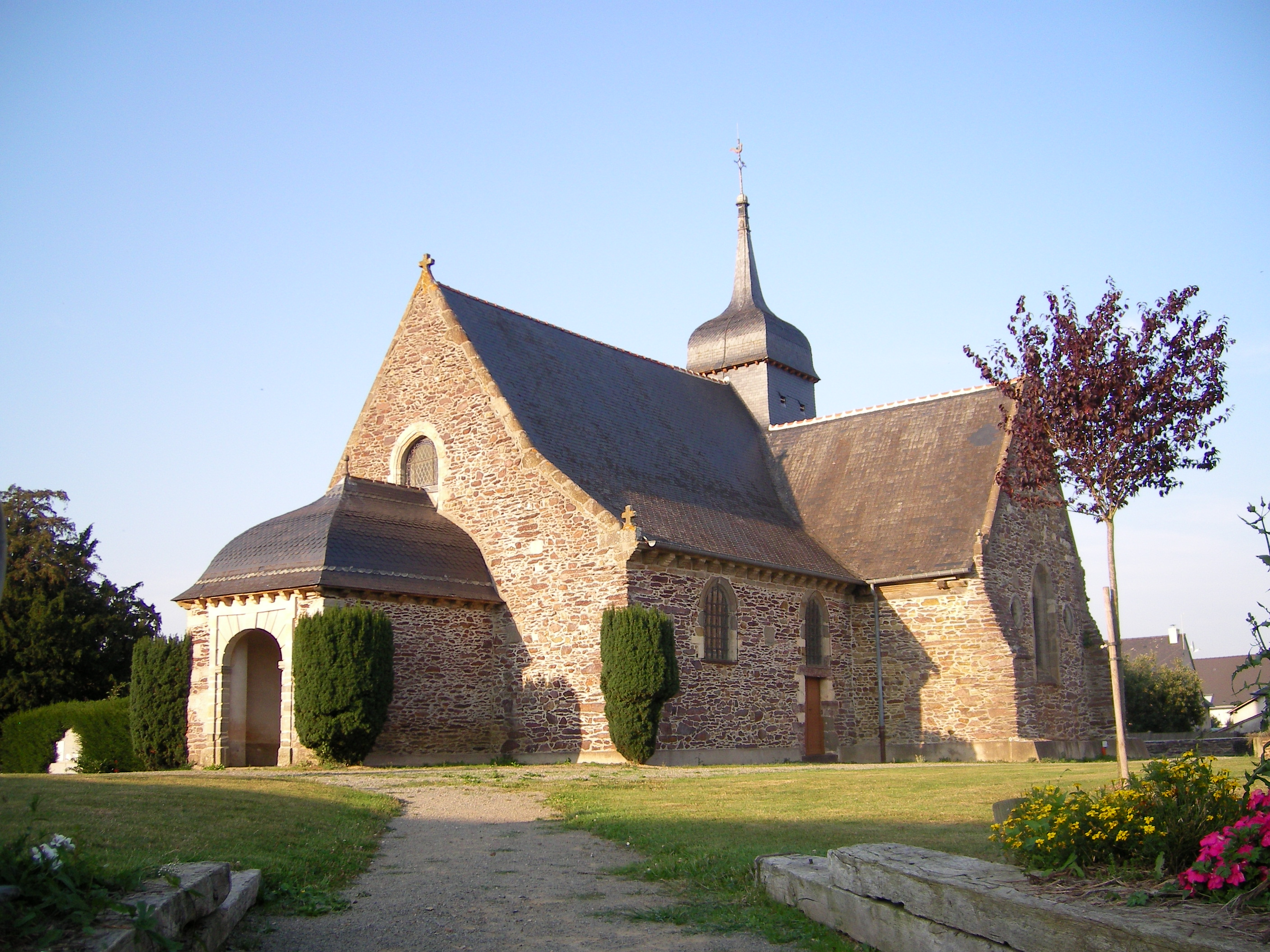
- Saint Melaine church
- Location of Cintré
- Location within France Location within Brittany
- Coordinates: 48°06′20″N 1°52′20″W
- Country: France
- Region: Brittany
- Department: Ille-et-Vilaine
- Arrondissement: Rennes
- Canton: Le Rheu
- Intercommunality: Rennes Métropole

Government
  - Mayor (2020–2026): Jacques Ruello
- Area^{1}: 8.24 km^{2} (3.18 sq mi)
- Highest elevation: 63 m (207 ft)
- Lowest elevation: 25 m (82 ft)
- Population (2023): 2,645
  - Density: 321/km^{2} (831/sq mi)
- Time zone: UTC+01:00 (CET)
  - Summer (DST): UTC+02:00 (CEST)
- INSEE/Postal code: 35080 /35310
- ^{1} French Land Register data, which excludes lakes, ponds, glaciers > 1 km^{2} (0.386 sq mi or 247 acres) and river estuaries.

Cintré (French pronunciation: [sɛ̃tʁe]; Breton: Kentreg; Gallo: Ceintraé) is a commune in the Ille-et-Vilaine department of Brittany in northwestern France.

== Geography ==
The river Meu forms all of the commune's western border.

== Population ==
Inhabitants of Cintré are called Cintréens in French.

Historical population
Year	Pop.	±% p.a.
1968	534	—
1975	857	+6.99%
1982	1,072	+3.25%
1990	1,173	+1.13%
1999	1,470	+2.54%
2007	2,077	+4.42%
2012	2,162	+0.81%
2017	2,278	+1.05%
2023	2,645	+2.52%
Source: INSEE

== See also ==
- Communes of the Ille-et-Vilaine department
