= Arnshöfen =

- Municipality
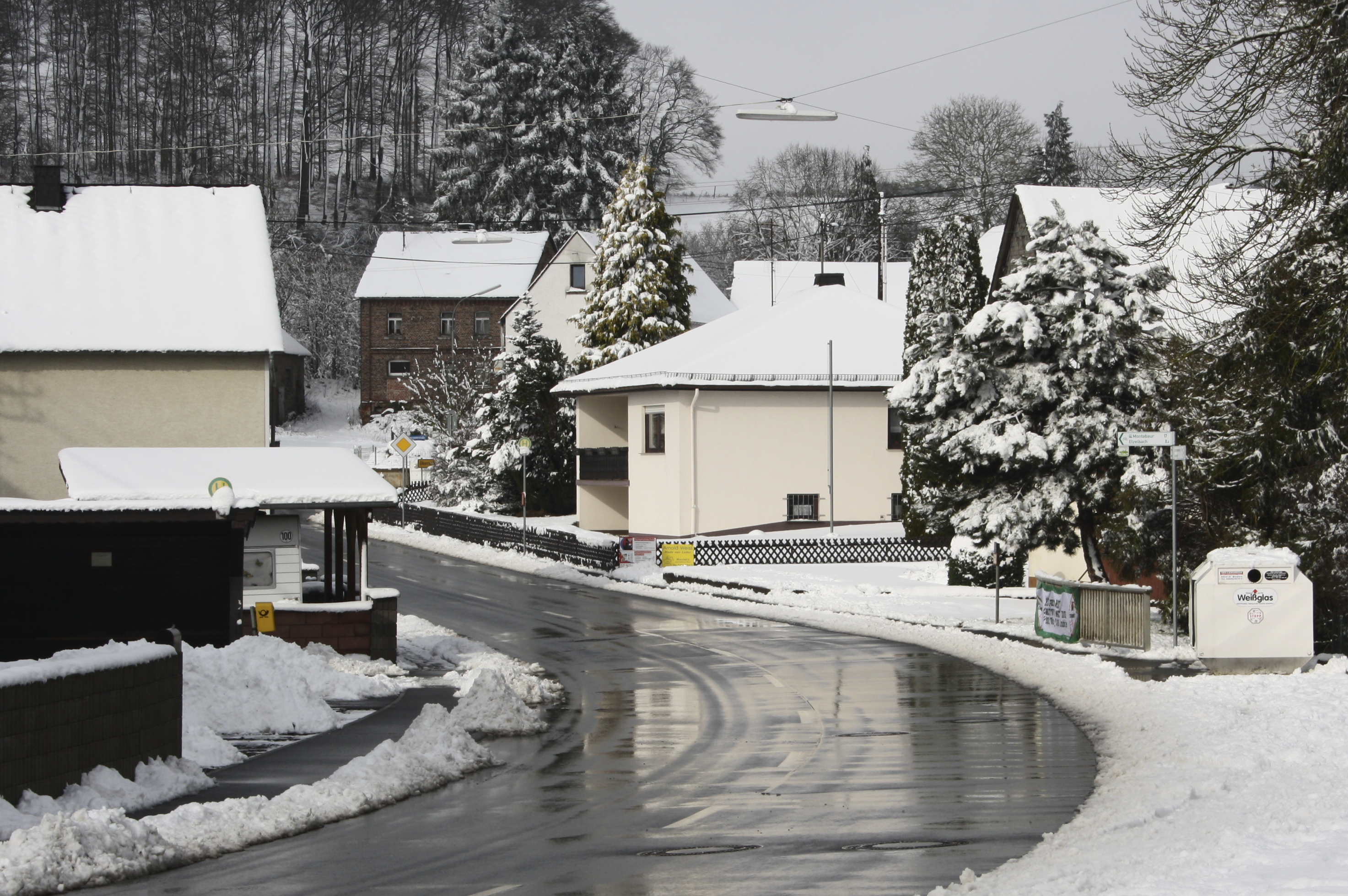

- Coat of arms

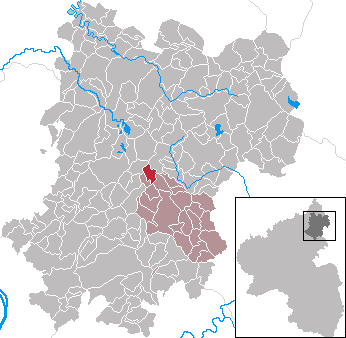
- Location of Arnshöfen within Westerwaldkreis district
- Interactive map of Arnshöfen
- Location within Germany Location within Rhineland-Palatinate
- Coordinates: 50°32′26″N 7°52′12″E
- Country: Germany
- State: Rhineland-Palatinate
- District: Westerwaldkreis
- Municipal assoc.: Wallmerod
- Subdivisions: 4 Ortsteile

Government
  - Mayor (2019–24): Michaela Hehl

Area
  - Total: 2.94 km^{2} (1.14 sq mi)
- Elevation: 412 m (1,352 ft)

Population (2025-12-31)
  - Total: 175
  - Density: 59.5/km^{2} (154/sq mi)
- Time zone: UTC+01:00 (CET)
  - Summer (DST): UTC+02:00 (CEST)
- Postal codes: 56244
- Dialling codes: 02666
- Vehicle registration: WW
- Website: www.arnshoefen.de

Arnshöfen is an Ortsgemeinde – a municipality belonging to a Verbandsgemeinde – in the Westerwaldkreis in Rhineland-Palatinate, Germany. It belongs to the Verbandsgemeinde of Wallmerod, a kind of collective municipality.

== Geography ==
=== Location ===
The municipality lies in the Westerwald between Montabaur and Hachenburg, right near the Westerwald Lake Plateau.

=== Constituent communities ===
Arnshöfen's Ortsteile are Arnshöfen, Etzelbach and Niederdorf.

== History ==
In 1525, Arnshöfen had its first documentary mention.

== Politics ==
The municipal council is made up of 6 council members who were elected in a majority vote in a municipal election on 7 June 2009.

== Economy and infrastructure ==
The bus lines 481 and 959 pass through Arnshöfen. The village is located in the zone number 424 of the public transport association Verkehrsverbund Rhein-Mosel (VRM). Right through the municipality runs Bundesstraße 8, which links Altenkirchen (Westerwald) and Limburg an der Lahn. The nearest Autobahn interchange is Montabaur on Bundesautobahn 3 (Cologne–Frankfurt am Main), some 15 km away. The nearest InterCityExpress stop is the railway station at Montabaur on the Cologne-Frankfurt high-speed rail line.

For electricity or there's a wind farm located on the ground of Arnshöfen, Ettinghausen and Hahn am See.
