= Chavagne =

Chavagne Chavayn (Gallo) Kavan (Breton)
- Commune
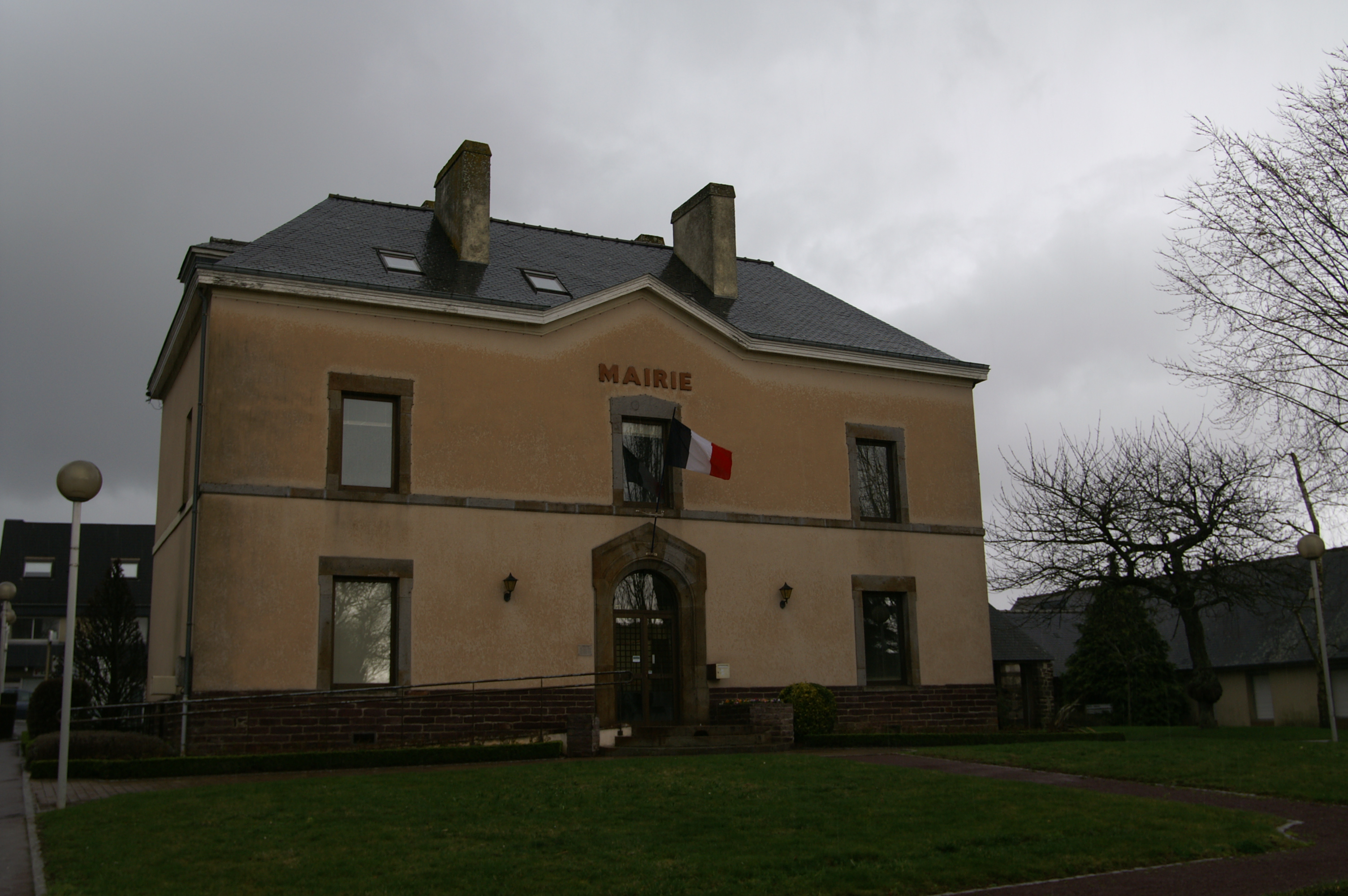
- Town hall
- Location of Chavagne
- Location within France Location within Brittany
- Coordinates: 48°03′17″N 1°47′00″W
- Country: France
- Region: Brittany
- Department: Ille-et-Vilaine
- Arrondissement: Rennes
- Canton: Le Rheu
- Intercommunality: Rennes Métropole

Government
  - Mayor (2020–2026): René Bouillon
- Area^{1}: 12.44 km^{2} (4.80 sq mi)
- Highest elevation: 38 m (125 ft)
- Lowest elevation: 16 m (52 ft)
- Population (2023): 4,709
  - Density: 378.5/km^{2} (980.4/sq mi)
- Time zone: UTC+01:00 (CET)
  - Summer (DST): UTC+02:00 (CEST)
- INSEE/Postal code: 35076 /35310
- ^{1} French Land Register data, which excludes lakes, ponds, glaciers > 1 km^{2} (0.386 sq mi or 247 acres) and river estuaries.

Chavagne (French pronunciation: [ʃavaɲ]; Breton: Kavan; Gallo: Chavayn) is a commune in the Ille-et-Vilaine department of Brittany in northwestern France.

== Geography ==
The river Meu forms all of the commune's southern border, then flows into the Vilaine, which forms all of its eastern border.

== Population ==
Inhabitants of Chavagne are called Chavagnais and Chavagnaises in French.

Historical population
Year	Pop.	±% p.a.
1968	874	—
1975	1,667	+9.66%
1982	2,244	+4.34%
1990	2,844	+3.01%
1999	3,091	+0.93%
2007	3,701	+2.28%
2012	3,708	+0.04%
2017	4,015	+1.60%
2023	4,709	+2.69%
Source: INSEE

== See also ==
- Communes of the Ille-et-Vilaine department
