= Vezin-le-Coquet =

Vezin-le-Coquet Bezein (Gallo) Gwezin (Breton)
- Commune
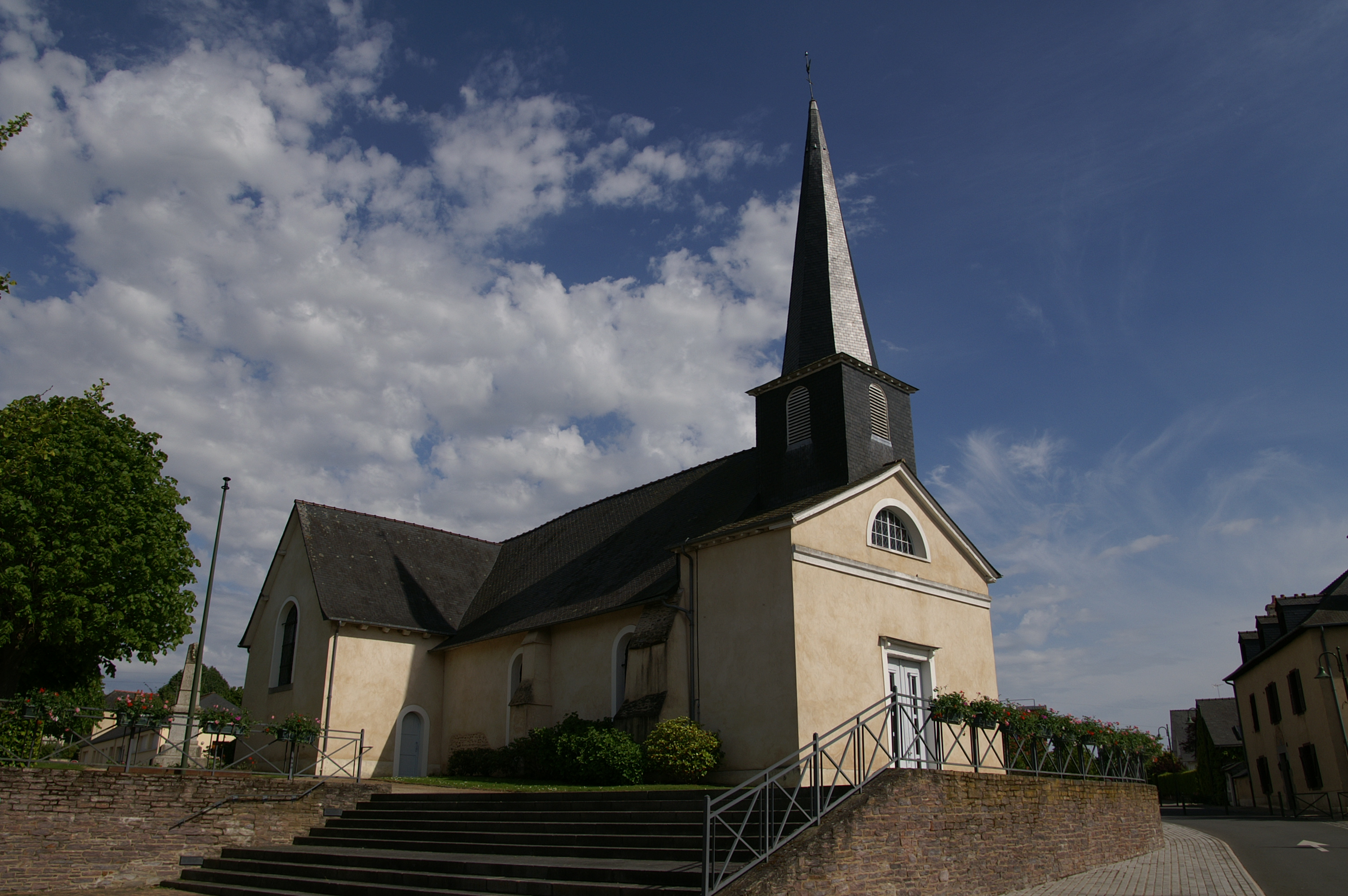
- The church in Vezin-le-Coquet
- Location of Vezin-le-Coquet
- Location within France Location within Brittany
- Coordinates: 48°07′10″N 1°45′17″W
- Country: France
- Region: Brittany
- Department: Ille-et-Vilaine
- Arrondissement: Rennes
- Canton: Le Rheu
- Intercommunality: Rennes Métropole

Government
  - Mayor (2020–2026): René-François Houssin
- Area^{1}: 7.86 km^{2} (3.03 sq mi)
- Highest elevation: 67 m (220 ft)
- Lowest elevation: 21 m (69 ft)
- Population (2023): 6,471
  - Density: 823/km^{2} (2,130/sq mi)
- Time zone: UTC+01:00 (CET)
  - Summer (DST): UTC+02:00 (CEST)
- INSEE/Postal code: 35353 /35132
- ^{1} French Land Register data, which excludes lakes, ponds, glaciers > 1 km^{2} (0.386 sq mi or 247 acres) and river estuaries.

Vezin-le-Coquet (French pronunciation: [vəzɛ̃ lə kɔkɛ]; Breton: Gwezin; Gallo: Bezein) is a commune in the Ille-et-Vilaine department of Brittany in northwestern France.

A men's prison, the Centre Penitentiaire pour Hommes de Vezin (operational since March 2010), is located within the commune.

== Population ==
Inhabitants of Vezin-le-Coquet are called Vezinois in French.

Historical population
Year	Pop.	±% p.a.
1968	1,596	—
1975	2,207	+4.74%
1982	2,731	+3.09%
1990	3,268	+2.27%
1999	4,026	+2.34%
2007	3,865	−0.51%
2012	4,838	+4.59%
2017	5,727	+3.43%
2023	6,471	+2.06%
Source: INSEE

== See also ==
- Communes of the Ille-et-Vilaine department
