= L'Hermitage =

L'Hermitage L'Ermitaij (Gallo) Ar Peniti (Breton)
- Commune
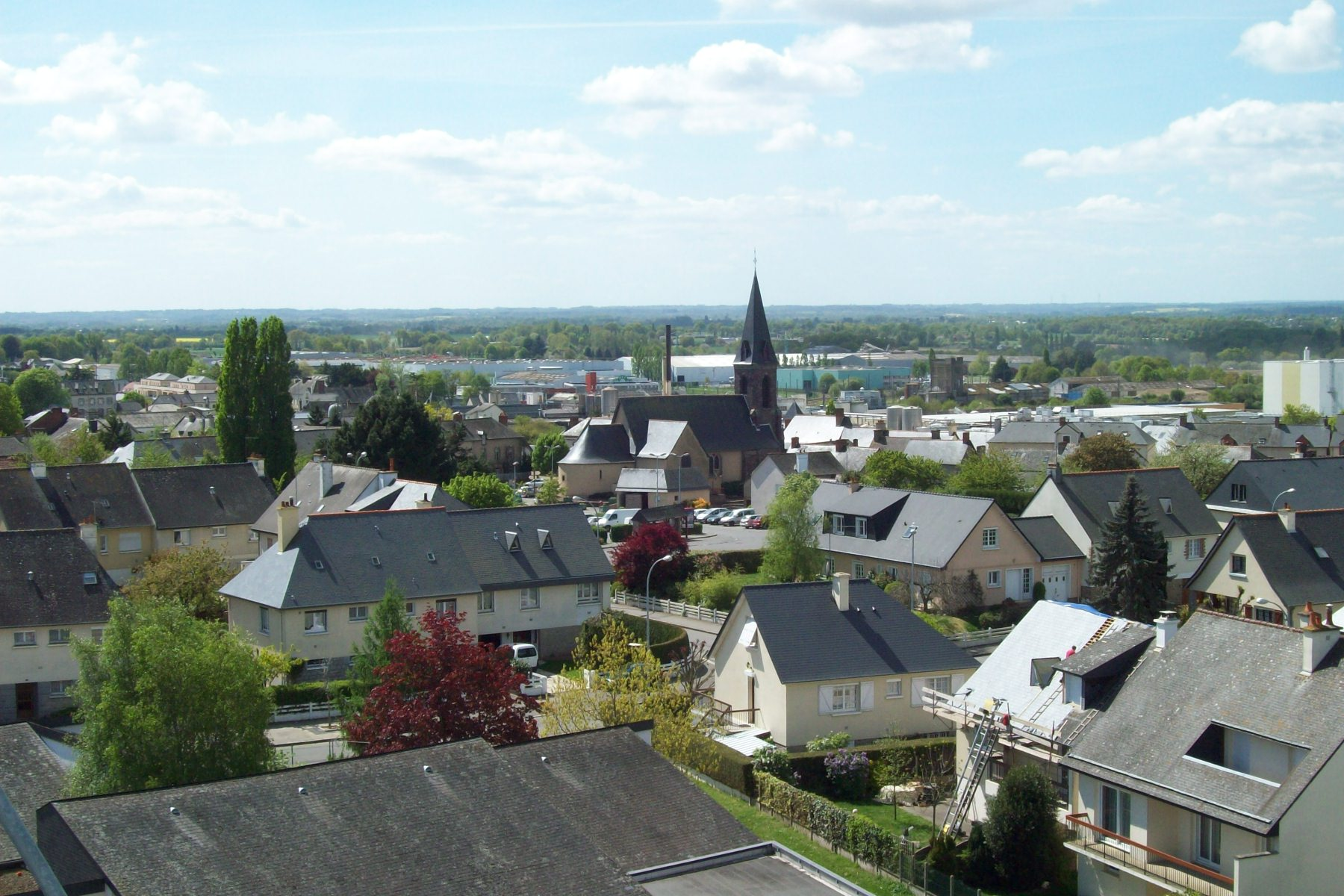
- A view of the town centre of L'Hermitage
- Location of L'Hermitage
- Location within France Location within Brittany
- Coordinates: 48°07′36″N 1°48′52″W
- Country: France
- Region: Brittany
- Department: Ille-et-Vilaine
- Arrondissement: Rennes
- Canton: Le Rheu
- Intercommunality: Rennes Métropole

Government
  - Mayor (2020–2026): André Chouan
- Area^{1}: 6.74 km^{2} (2.60 sq mi)
- Highest elevation: 56 m (184 ft)
- Lowest elevation: 27 m (89 ft)
- Population (2023): 4,730
  - Density: 702/km^{2} (1,820/sq mi)
- Time zone: UTC+01:00 (CET)
  - Summer (DST): UTC+02:00 (CEST)
- INSEE/Postal code: 35131 /35590
- ^{1} French Land Register data, which excludes lakes, ponds, glaciers > 1 km^{2} (0.386 sq mi or 247 acres) and river estuaries.

L'Hermitage (French pronunciation: [lɛʁmitaʒ]; Breton: Ar Peniti; Gallo: L'Ermitaij) is a commune in the Ille-et-Vilaine department in Brittany in northwestern France.

== Population ==
Inhabitants of L'Hermitage are called Hermitageois in French.

Historical population
Year	Pop.	±% p.a.
1968	1,404	—
1975	2,279	+7.17%
1982	3,039	+4.20%
1990	3,256	+0.87%
1999	3,093	−0.57%
2007	3,720	+2.33%
2012	3,958	+1.25%
2017	4,437	+2.31%
2023	4,730	+1.07%
Source: INSEE

== See also ==
- Communes of the Ille-et-Vilaine department
