= Chevaigné =

Chevaigné Chaevaènyaé (Gallo) Kavaneg (Breton)
- Commune
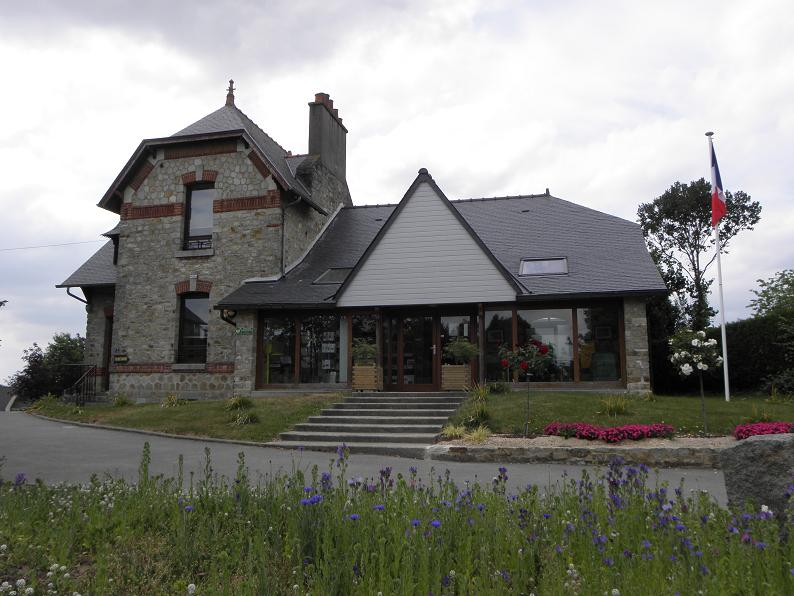
- Town hall

- Coat of arms
- Location of Chevaigné
- Location within France Location within Brittany
- Coordinates: 48°12′46″N 1°37′42″W
- Country: France
- Region: Brittany
- Department: Ille-et-Vilaine
- Arrondissement: Rennes
- Canton: Betton
- Intercommunality: Rennes Métropole

Government
  - Mayor (2020–2026): Sandrine Vincent
- Area^{1}: 10.33 km^{2} (3.99 sq mi)
- Highest elevation: 90 m (300 ft)
- Lowest elevation: 32 m (105 ft)
- Population (2023): 2,397
  - Density: 232.0/km^{2} (601.0/sq mi)
- Time zone: UTC+01:00 (CET)
  - Summer (DST): UTC+02:00 (CEST)
- INSEE/Postal code: 35079 /35250
- ^{1} French Land Register data, which excludes lakes, ponds, glaciers > 1 km^{2} (0.386 sq mi or 247 acres) and river estuaries.

Chevaigné (French pronunciation: [ʃəvɛɲe]; Breton: Kavaneg; Gallo: Chaevaènyaé) is a commune in the Ille-et-Vilaine department of Brittany in north-western France.

== Population ==
Inhabitants of Chevaigné are called Chevaignéens in French.

Historical population
Year	Pop.	±% p.a.
1968	705	—
1975	773	+1.32%
1982	972	+3.33%
1990	1,335	+4.05%
1999	1,620	+2.17%
2007	1,865	+1.78%
2012	1,875	+0.11%
2017	2,265	+3.85%
2023	2,397	+0.95%
Source: INSEE

== See also ==
- Communes of the Ille-et-Vilaine department
