= Rennes Métropole =

Coordinates: 48.1142°N 1.6808°W

- Métropole

- Location within the Ille-et-Vilaine department
- Country: France
- Region: Brittany
- Department: Ille-et-Vilaine
- No. of communes: {{{nbcomm}}}
- Established: January 2015

Government
  - President (2020-2026): Nathalie Appéré (PS)
- Area: 705.0 km^{2} (272.2 sq mi)
- Population (2018): 451,762
  - Density: 640.8/km^{2} (1,660/sq mi)
- Website: Rennes-Metropole.fr

Rennes Métropole (French pronunciation: [ʁɛn metʁɔpɔl]) is the métropole, an intercommunal structure, centred on the city of Rennes. It is located in the Ille-et-Vilaine department, in the Brittany region, western France. It was created in January 2015, replacing the previous Communauté d'agglomération de Rennes, which had itself succeeded in 2000 to the previous district created in 1970 with less powers than the current métropole. Its area is 705.0 km^{2}. Its population was 451,762 in 2018, of which 217,728 in Rennes proper.

The goal of the Métropoles (intercommunal structure for the largest French cities like Lille, Lyon, Bordeaux or Strasbourg) is to build a better metropolitan area by synchronizing the transport system, environmental actions, urbanization, economic and social development, culture, university research, etc.

== Participants ==
The métropole comprises the following 43 communes:

1. Acigné
2. Bécherel
3. Betton
4. Bourgbarré
5. Brécé
6. Bruz
7. Cesson-Sévigné
8. Chantepie
9. La Chapelle-Chaussée
10. La Chapelle-des-Fougeretz
11. La Chapelle-Thouarault
12. Chartres-de-Bretagne
13. Chavagne
14. Chevaigné
15. Cintré
16. Clayes
17. Corps-Nuds
18. Gévezé
19. L'Hermitage
20. Laillé
21. Langan
22. Miniac-sous-Bécherel
23. Montgermont
24. Mordelles
25. Nouvoitou
26. Noyal-Châtillon-sur-Seiche
27. Orgères, Ille-et-Vilaine
28. Pacé
29. Parthenay-de-Bretagne
30. Pont-Péan
31. Rennes (seat)
32. Le Rheu
33. Romillé
34. Saint-Armel
35. Saint-Erblon
36. Saint-Gilles
37. Saint-Grégoire
38. Saint-Jacques-de-la-Lande
39. Saint-Sulpice-la-Forêt
40. Thorigné-Fouillard
41. Le Verger
42. Vern-sur-Seiche
43. Vezin-le-Coquet

Metropolitan Rennes (450,000 inhabitants) encompasses only the central part of the metropolitan area of Rennes (750,000 inhabitants). Communes further away from the center of the metropolitan area have formed their own intercommunal structures, such as Châteaugiron, Noyal-sur-Vilaine, Liffré, Melesse, La Mézière, Montfort-sur-Meu or Guichen.

== Gallery ==
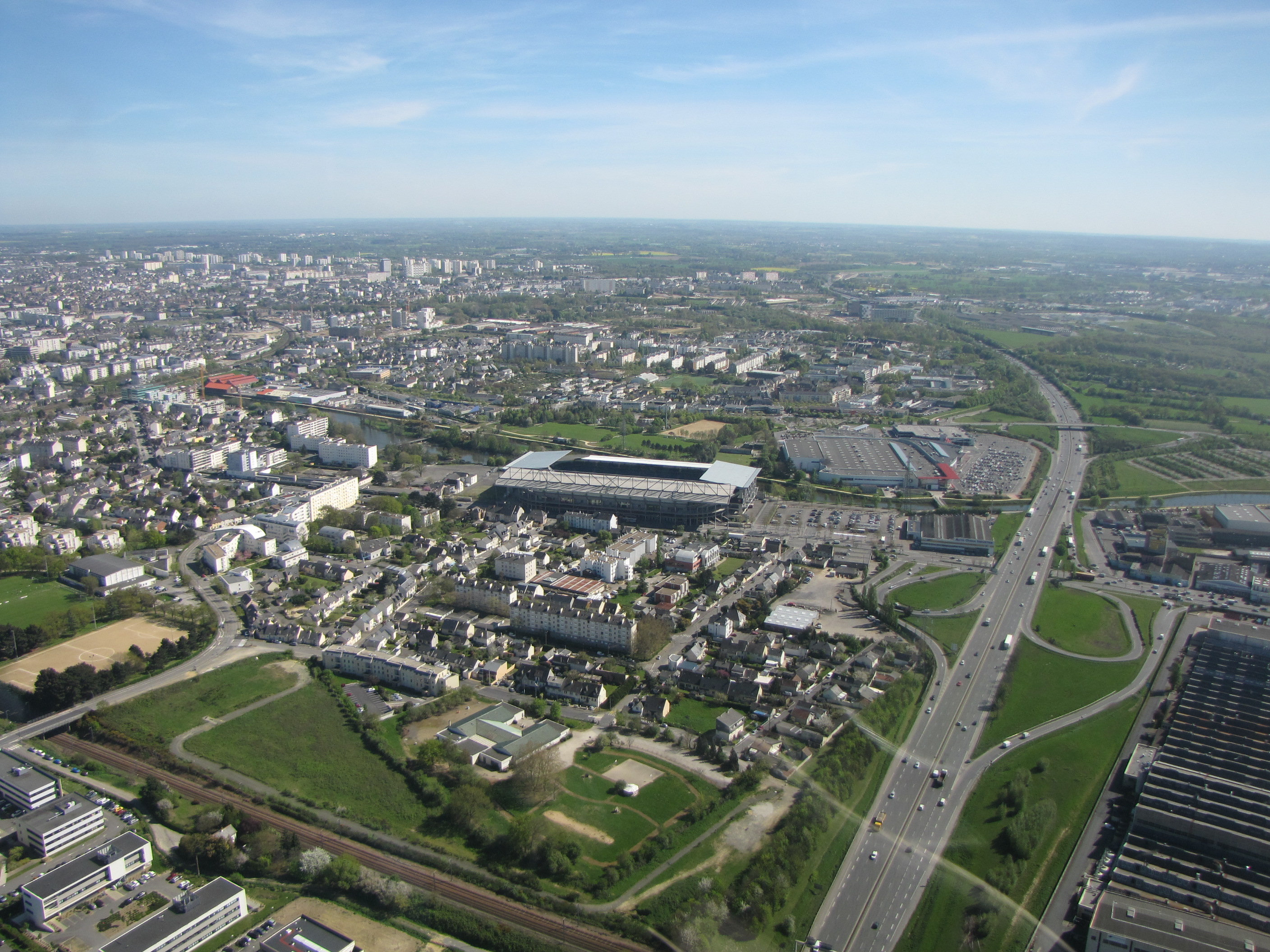
Rennes Metropole view

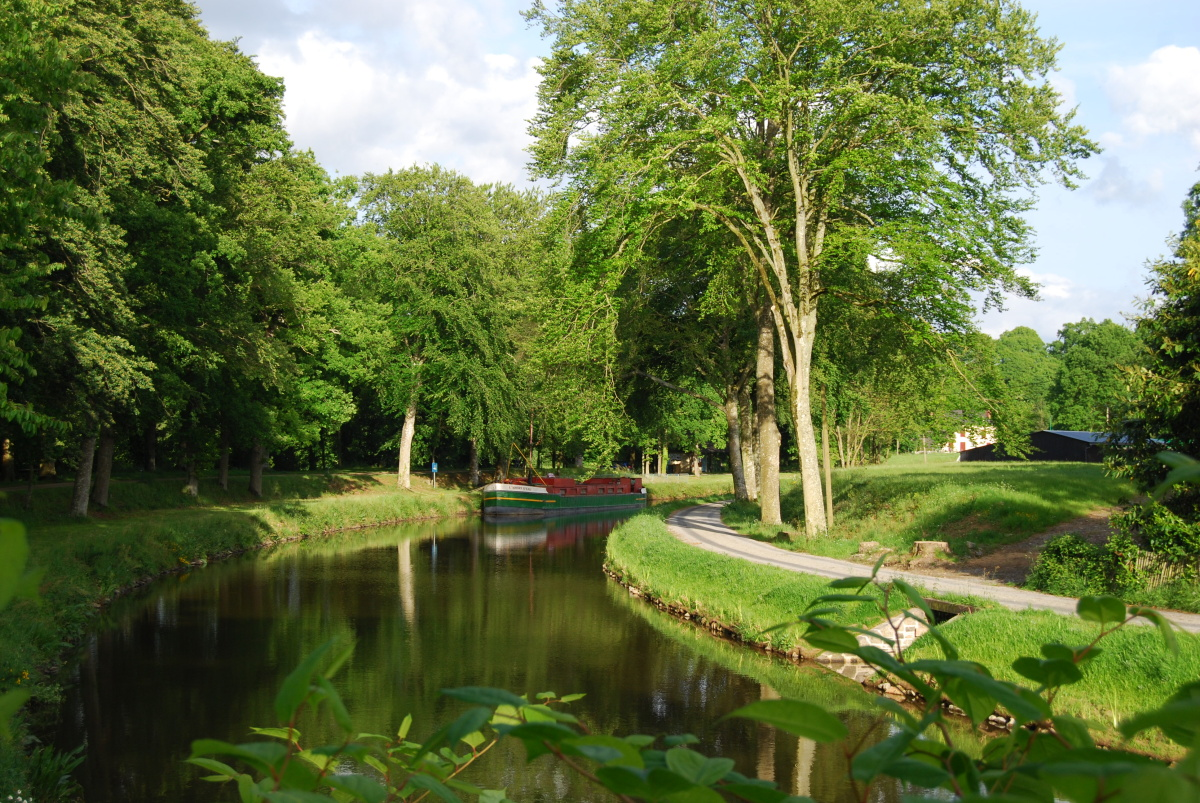
The Ille in Chevaigné

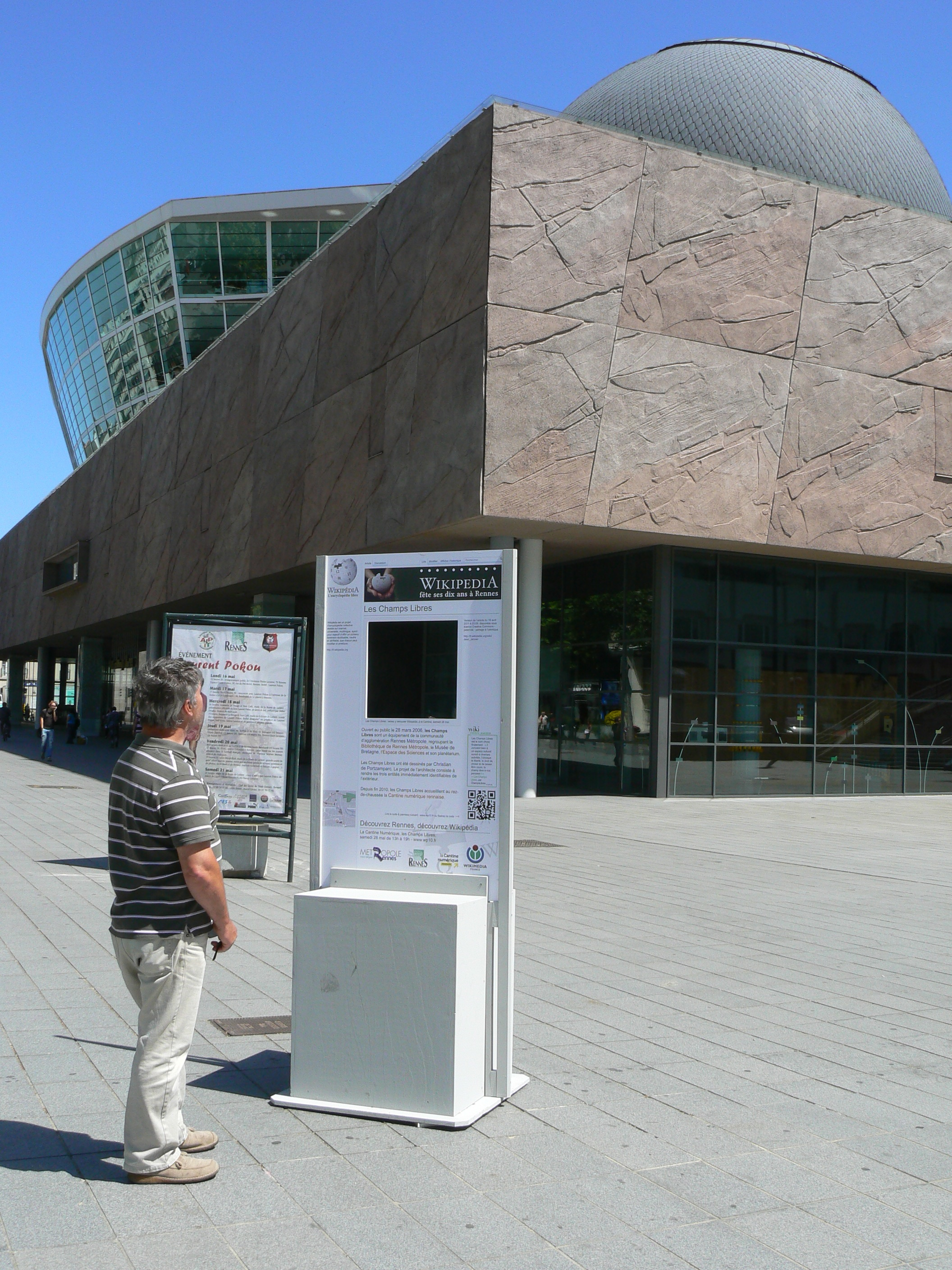
Metropolitan cultural center Les Champs Libres

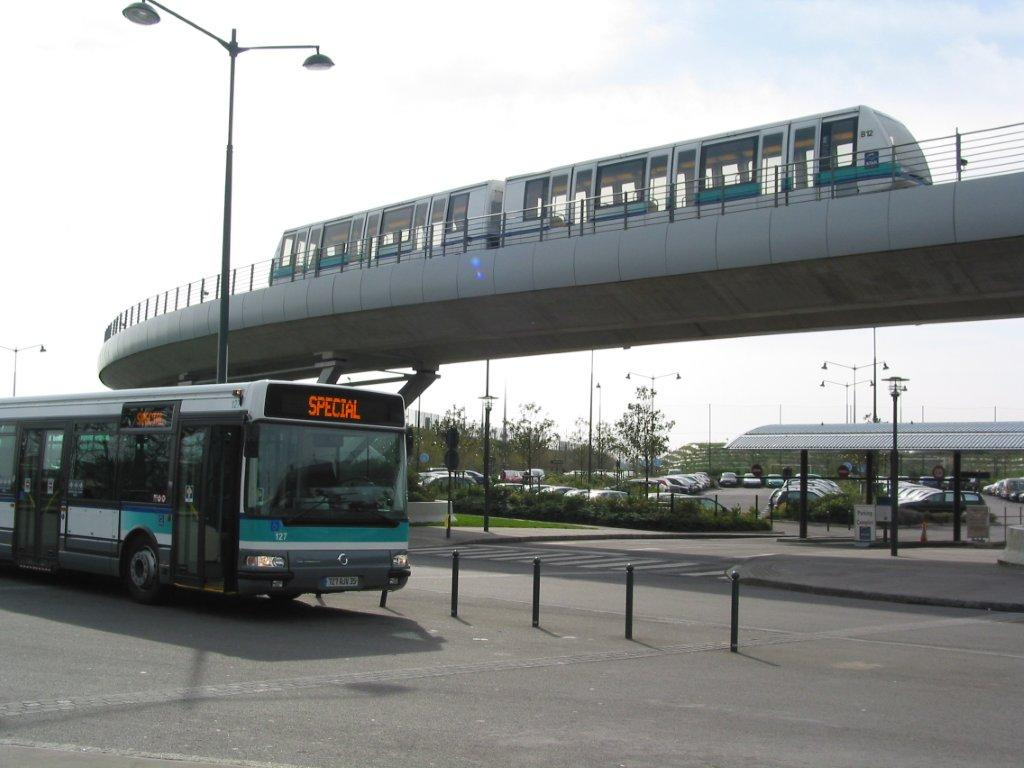
Bus and Rennes Metro

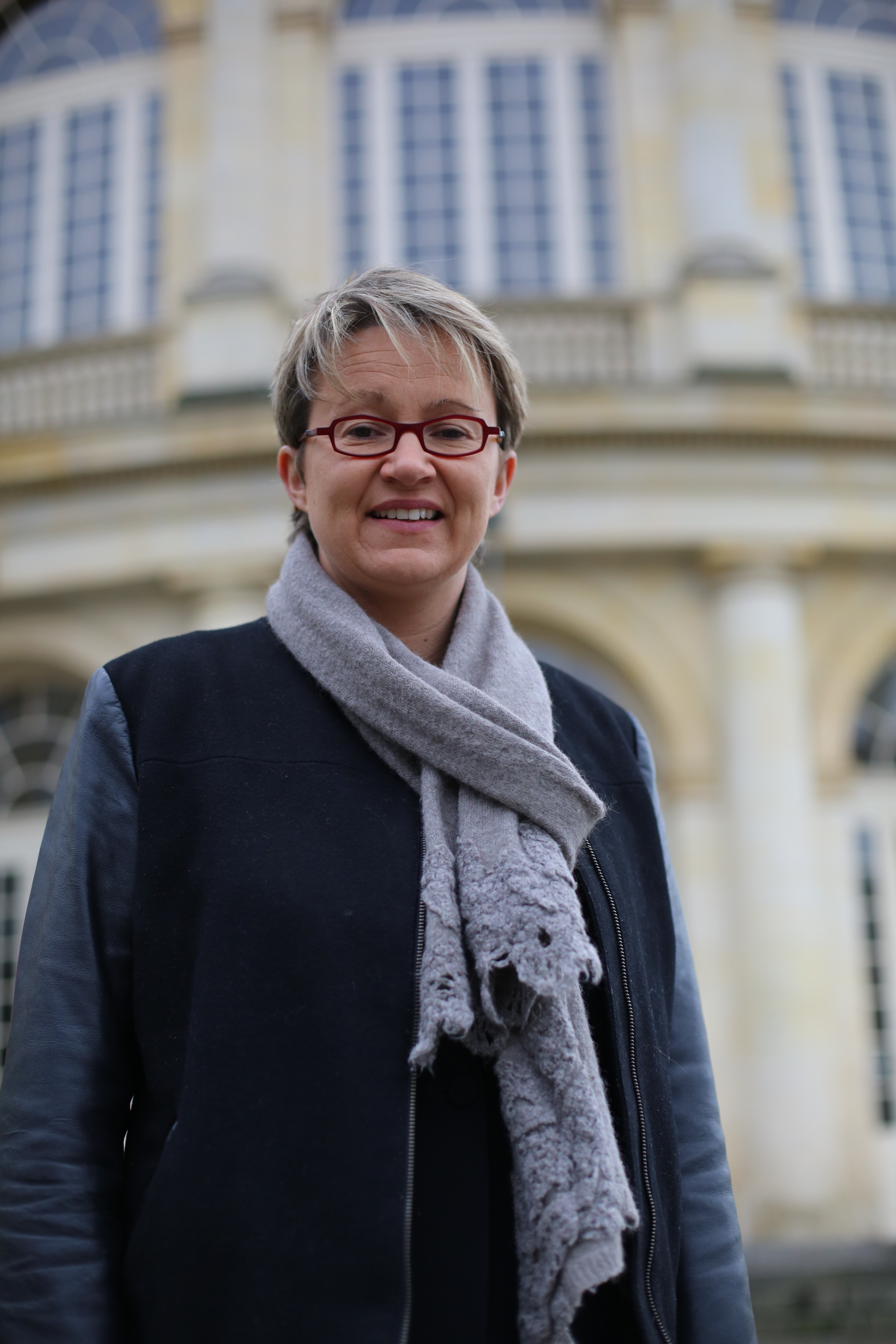
Metropole president

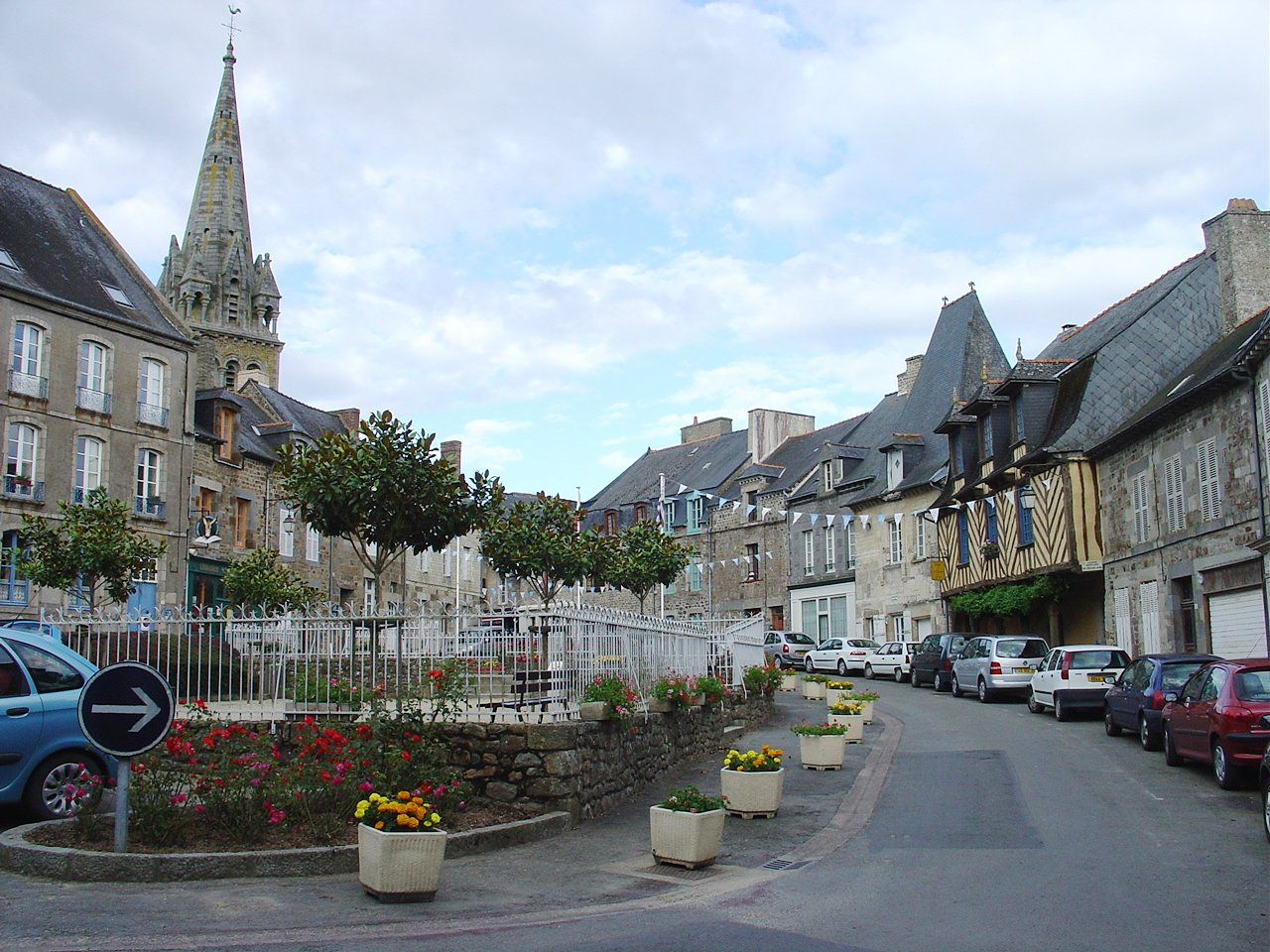
Bécherel book town

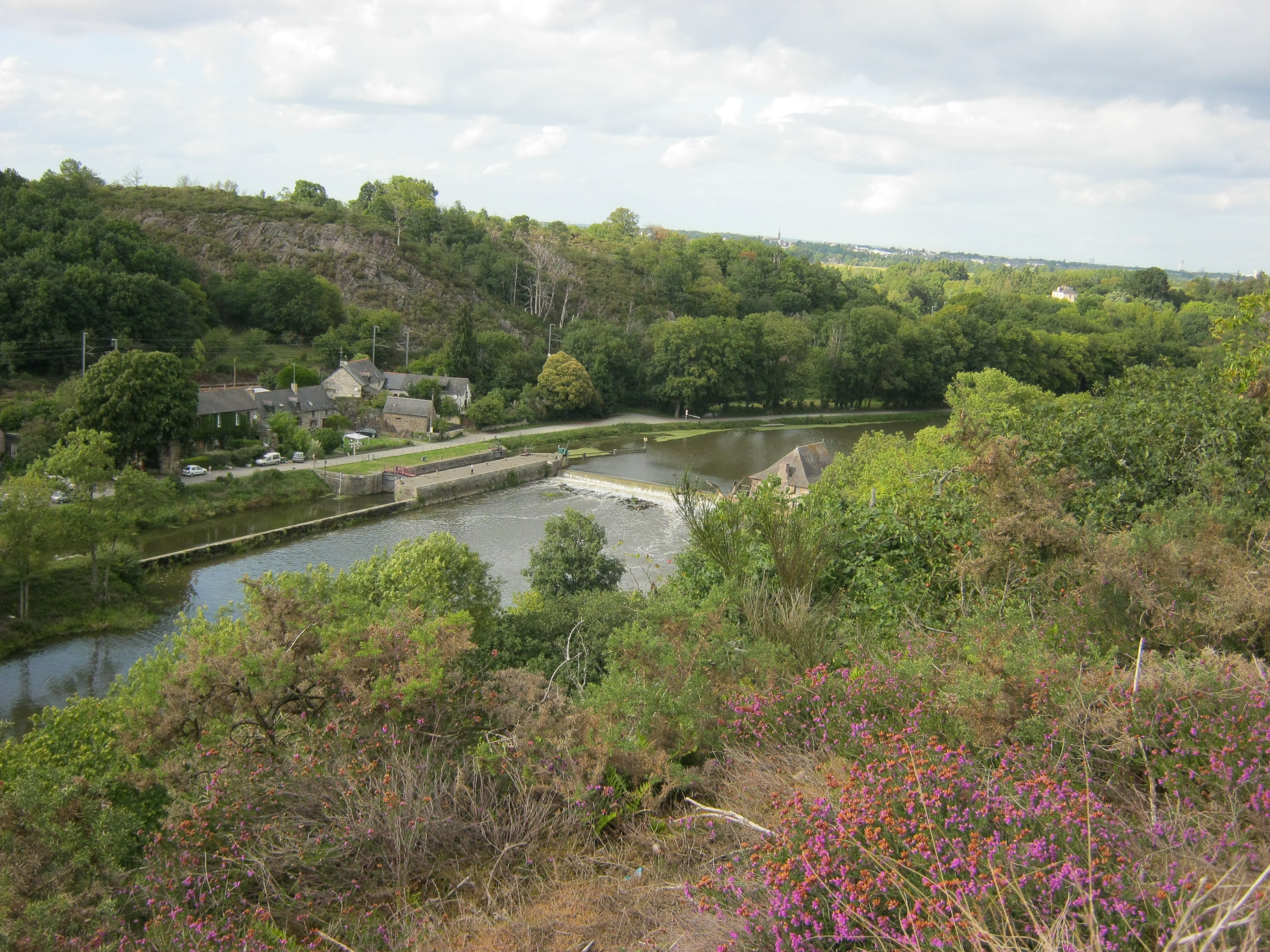
The Vilaine in Bruz

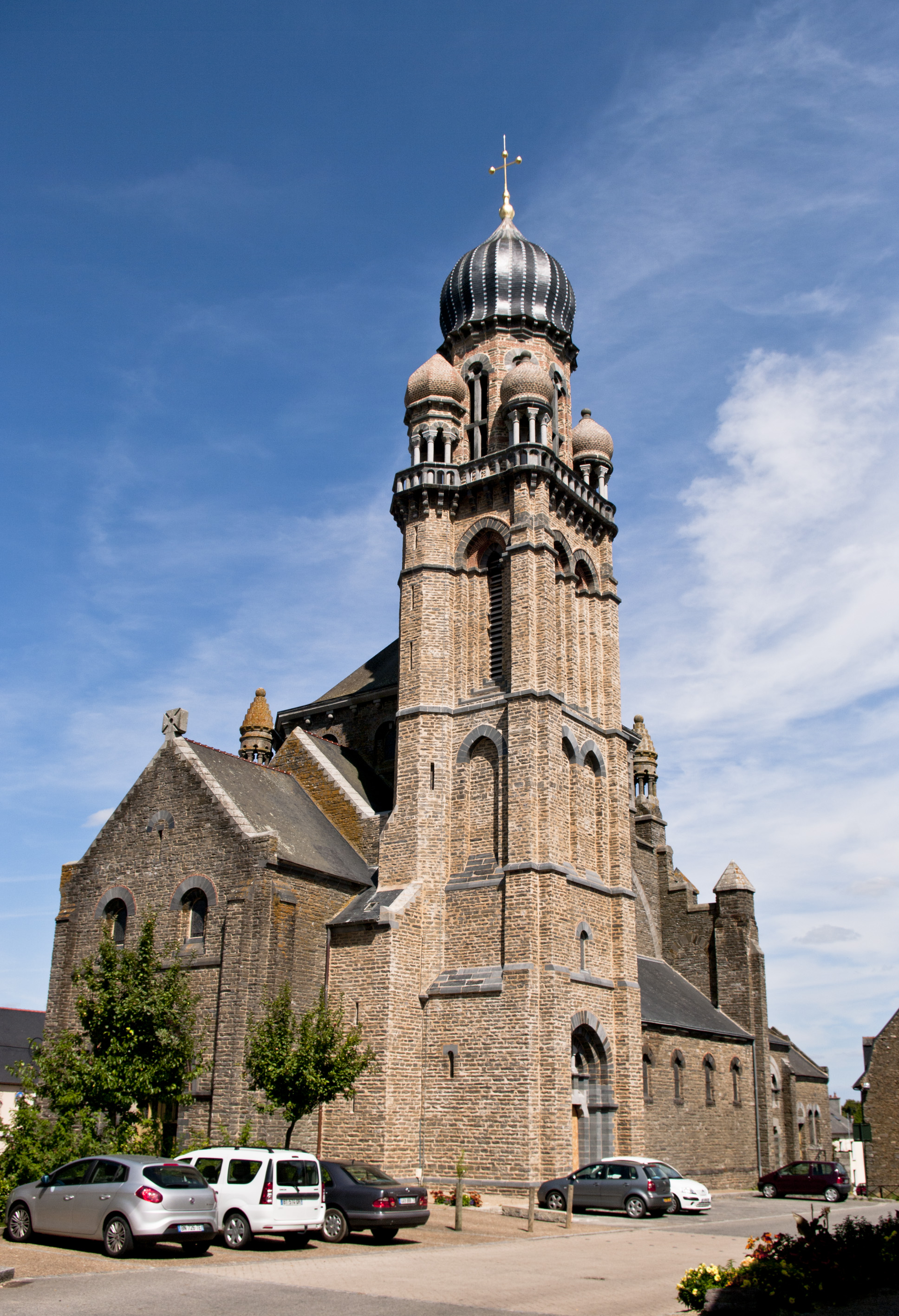
Saint-Maximilien church in Corps-Nuds
