= Canton of Betton =

Coordinates: 48.1686°N 1.6947°W

Betton
- Canton
- Country: France
- Region: Brittany
- Department: Ille-et-Vilaine
- No. of communes: {{{nbcomm}}}
- Area: 99.88 km^{2} (38.56 sq mi)
- Population (2023): 52,644
  - Density: 527.1/km^{2} (1,365/sq mi)
- INSEE code: 35 03

The Canton of Betton is a canton of France, in the Ille-et-Vilaine département. At the French canton reorganisation which came into effect in March 2015, the canton was expanded from 4 to 6 communes:

- Betton
- Cesson-Sévigné
- La Chapelle-des-Fougeretz
- Chevaigné
- Montgermont
- Saint-Grégoire
