= Bréal-sous-Montfort =

Bréal-sous-Montfort Beréau (Gallo) Breal-Moñforzh (Breton)
- Commune
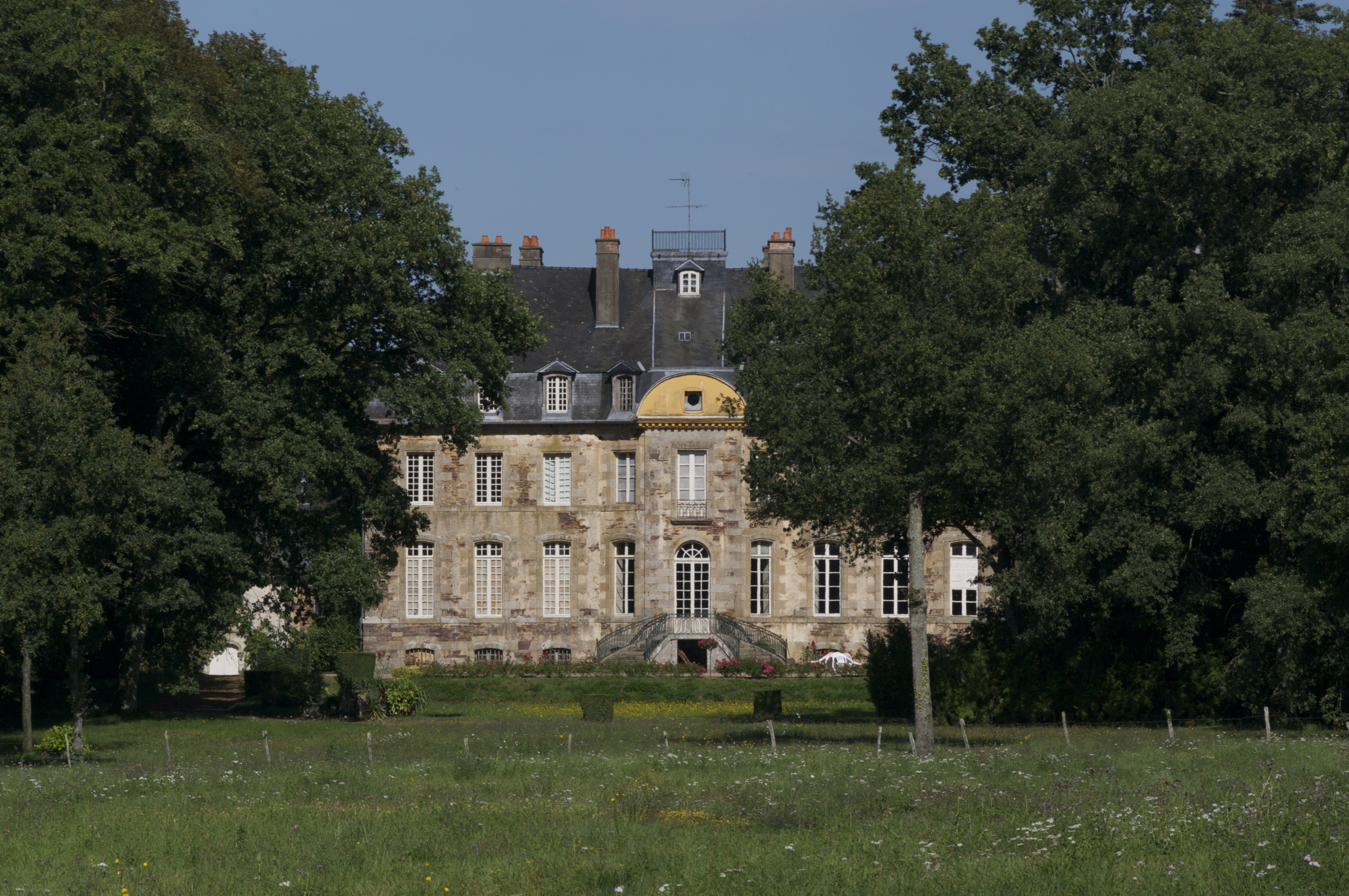
- Château du Molant

- Coat of arms
- Location of Bréal-sous-Montfort
- Location within France Location within Brittany
- Coordinates: 48°02′55″N 1°51′55″W
- Country: France
- Region: Brittany
- Department: Ille-et-Vilaine
- Arrondissement: Rennes
- Canton: Le Rheu
- Intercommunality: CC de Brocéliande

Government
  - Mayor (2020–2026): Bernard Éthoré
- Area^{1}: 33.82 km^{2} (13.06 sq mi)
- Highest elevation: 82 m (269 ft)
- Lowest elevation: 19 m (62 ft)
- Population (2023): 6,391
  - Density: 189.0/km^{2} (489.4/sq mi)
- Time zone: UTC+01:00 (CET)
  - Summer (DST): UTC+02:00 (CEST)
- INSEE/Postal code: 35037 /35310
- ^{1} French Land Register data, which excludes lakes, ponds, glaciers > 1 km^{2} (0.386 sq mi or 247 acres) and river estuaries.

Bréal-sous-Montfort (French pronunciation: [bʁeal su mɔ̃fɔʁ], literally Bréal under Montfort; Gallo: Beréau, Breton: Breal-Moñforzh) is a commune in the Ille-et-Vilaine department in the region in Brittany in northwestern France.

It is located in the outer southwest district of Rennes, near the Broceliand woods.

== Geography ==
The Meu forms the commune's northeastern border.

== Population ==
Inhabitants of Bréal-sous-Montfort are called Bréalais in French.

Historical population
Year	Pop.	±% p.a.
1968	1,771	—
1975	2,518	+5.16%
1982	3,117	+3.10%
1990	3,399	+1.09%
1999	3,825	+1.32%
2007	4,577	+2.27%
2012	5,216	+2.65%
2017	6,131	+3.29%
2023	6,391	+0.69%
Source: INSEE

== See also ==
- Communes of the Ille-et-Vilaine department
