= Sévignac =

Sévignac Sevinieg
- Commune
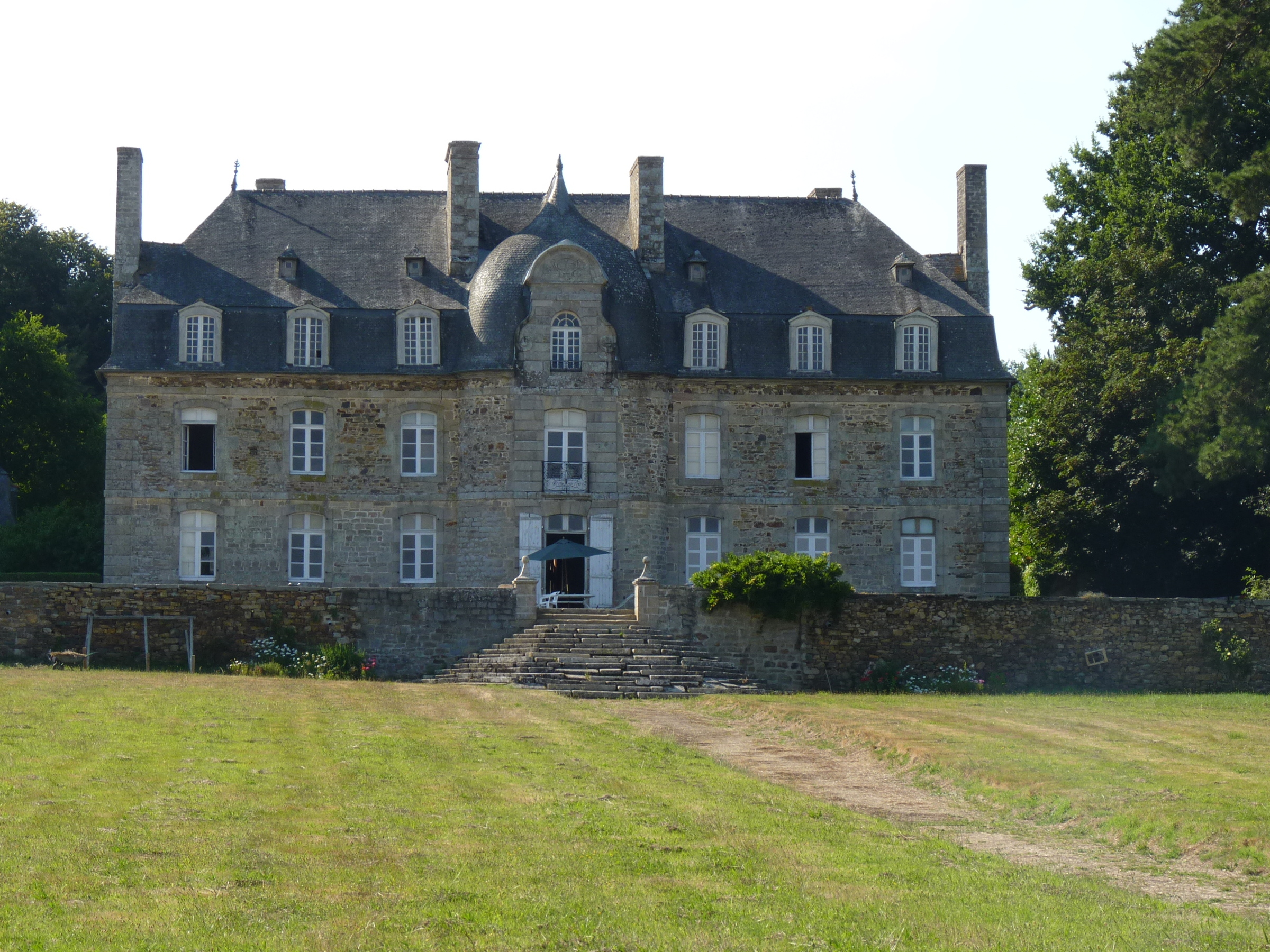
- The 18th century château of Limoëlan, in Sévignac

- Coat of arms
- Location of Sévignac
- Location within France Location within Brittany
- Coordinates: 48°20′01″N 2°20′14″W
- Country: France
- Region: Brittany
- Department: Côtes-d'Armor
- Arrondissement: Saint-Brieuc
- Canton: Broons
- Intercommunality: CA Lamballe Terre et Mer

Government
  - Mayor (2020–2026): Yvon Berhault
- Area^{1}: 43.25 km^{2} (16.70 sq mi)
- Highest elevation: 152 m (499 ft)
- Lowest elevation: 30 m (98 ft)
- Population (2023): 1,117
  - Density: 25.83/km^{2} (66.89/sq mi)
- Time zone: UTC+01:00 (CET)
  - Summer (DST): UTC+02:00 (CEST)
- INSEE/Postal code: 22337 /22250
- ^{1} French Land Register data, which excludes lakes, ponds, glaciers > 1 km^{2} (0.386 sq mi or 247 acres) and river estuaries.

Sévignac (French pronunciation: [seviɲak]; Breton: Sevinieg) is a commune in the Côtes-d'Armor department of Brittany in northwestern France.

== Toponymy ==
The name of the locality is attested in the forms Plebs Seminiaca in 869, Sivingac in 1212, Sevinar in 1218, Syvignac in 1239, Sevignac in 1256, 1262, and in 1266, Sivingnac in 1269, Sevignac in 1271, Seguignac in 1278, Sevignac in 1289, Saint Vingac in 1303, and Sevignac around 1330 and in 1340.

Sévignac comes from the Latin name Sabinius (a name of a veteran of the Roman legion who was awarded for his bravery around the time of Christ), and the Gaulish suffix acos.

However, it should not be overlooked that in the name Sévignac (Seminiacum) one finds the form sem(i)nio which means "throat".

== History ==
The origin of Sévignac dates back to the Gallo-Roman era.

One estate was awarded to Sabinius, a veteran of the Roman legion, at the 1st time of the Christian era, as a reward for his bravery. Such allocations were made at a time when, as a result of a demographic decline, a shortage of labor left a number of undeveloped lands.

Sévignac is mentioned under the name of Plebs Seminiaca in a charter from the abbey of Redon dating from November 29, 869 which mentions that Kingantdreh, daughter of Louvenan, gives by inheritance the parish of Sévignac to Salomon, King of Brittany, her adoptive son.

In the twelfth century, the Cistercian monks of Boquen built a barn and farm inhabited by lay people, which led to the prosperity to the hamlets of Pengave and Pengly, as well as the construction of the Chapel of Saint Cado.

The châteaux of Limoëlan, of the eleventh century and the eighteenth century, are built on the site of the former lordship owned by the family of Rousselot.

Sévignac saw the birth of the last bishop of Tréguier, Augustin-René-Louis Le Mintier (1729-1801), as well as Joseph Picot de Limoëlan, one of the perpetrators of the Plot of the rue Saint-Nicaise to kill Napoleon Bonaparte and his wife.

On the eve of the French Revolution, more than ten priests provided religious guidance within Sévignac. Under the First French Empire, Sévignac was populated by around 3,000 villagers, most of which were farmers. The town experienced strong depopulation at the end of the nineteenth century into the twentieth century.

== Population ==
Historical population
Year	Pop.	±% p.a.
1968	1,507	—
1975	1,307	−2.01%
1982	1,177	−1.49%
1990	1,075	−1.13%
1999	1,042	−0.35%
2007	1,108	+0.77%
2012	1,143	+0.62%
2017	1,088	−0.98%
2023	1,117	+0.44%
Source: INSEE

Inhabitants of Sévignac are called sévignacais in French.

== See also ==
- Communes of the Côtes-d'Armor department
