= Matthieu Ory =

French Dominican theologian and Inquisitor

Matthieu Ory (1492 at Caulnes – 1557 at Paris) was a French Dominican theologian and Inquisitor.

== Life ==
Entering the Dominican Order at the age of eighteen, he studied in the convent of St-Jacques, Paris, and at the Sorbonne, obtaining the licentiate in theology, 6 February 1527. His reputation for learning and eloquence led to his appointment as grand inquisitor for France (1534), an office which he held until his death.

Compelled to pronounce upon false accusations made against Ignatius Loyola and "The Spiritual", he detected the fraud. Instead of condemning Loyola, he praised and assisted him, and kept for himself a copy of the Exercises. He was indefatigable in preaching, and held several offices in his order. Some writers erroneously call Ory a Spaniard and write his name Ortiz.

== Works ==
The only fully authenticated printed work of Ory is his "Alexipharmacum" (Paris, 1544; Venice, 1551–58). In the second part he uses against the heretics five words of St. Paul, viz. grace, justification, sin, liberty, law (no exclusive reference to 1 Corinthians 14:19). Other works attributed to him are: Opusculum de imaginibus, and Septem scholae contra haereticos, but Jacques Échard does not assign the places or dates of their publication.
