= Rouillac =

Rouillac is the name of the following communes in France:

- Rouillac, Charente, in the Charente department
- Rouillac, Côtes-d'Armor, in the Côtes-d'Armor department
