= Yvignac-la-Tour =

Yvignac-la-Tour Ivinieg
- Commune
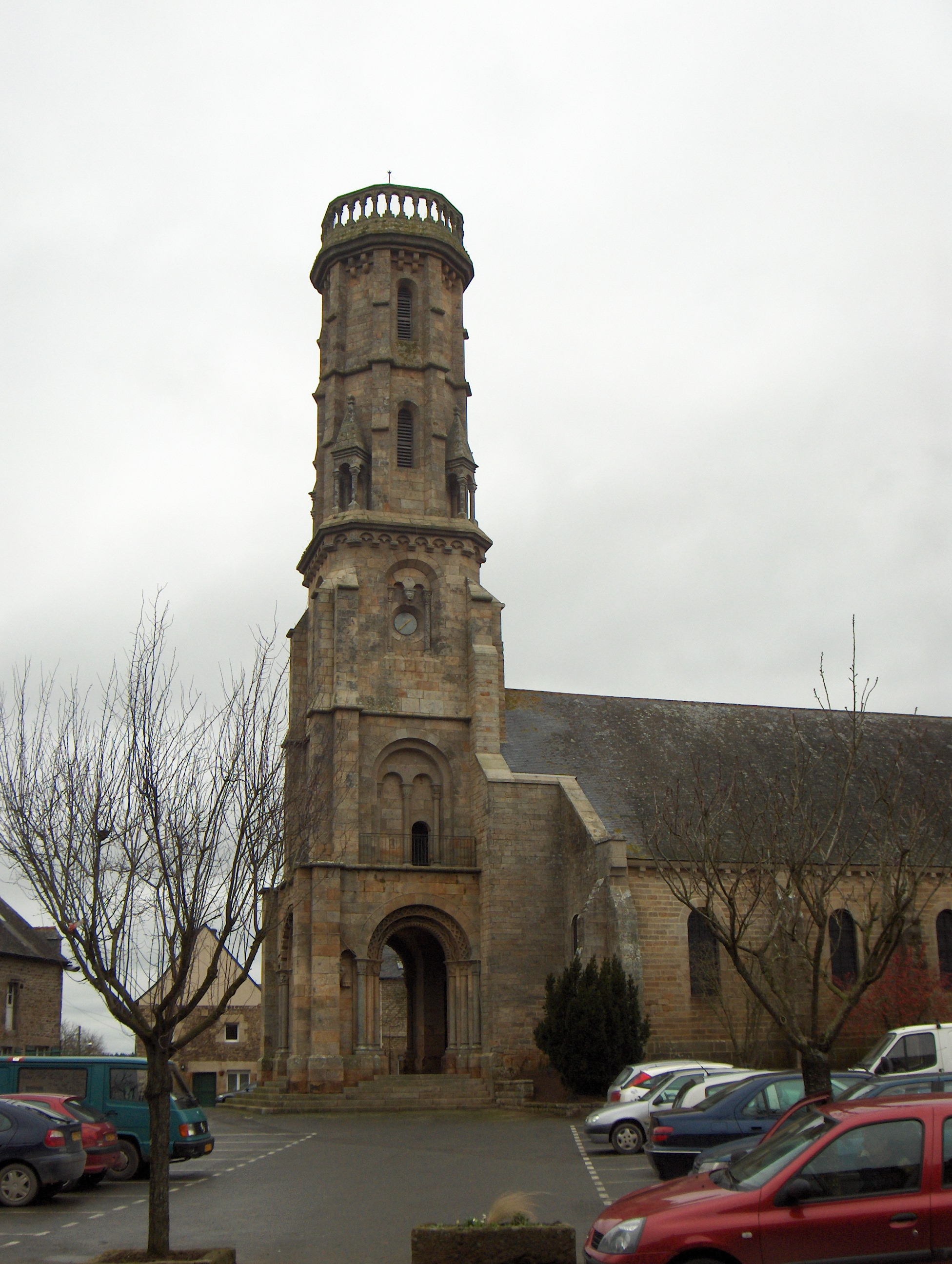
- Church

- Coat of arms
- Location of Yvignac-la-Tour
- Location within France Location within Brittany
- Coordinates: 48°20′57″N 2°10′30″W
- Country: France
- Region: Brittany
- Department: Côtes-d'Armor
- Arrondissement: Dinan
- Canton: Broons
- Intercommunality: Dinan Agglomération

Government
  - Mayor (2020–2026): Jean-Luc Boissel
- Area^{1}: 35.39 km^{2} (13.66 sq mi)
- Highest elevation: 131 m (430 ft)
- Lowest elevation: 52 m (171 ft)
- Population (2023): 1,135
  - Density: 32.07/km^{2} (83.06/sq mi)
- Time zone: UTC+01:00 (CET)
  - Summer (DST): UTC+02:00 (CEST)
- INSEE/Postal code: 22391 /22350
- ^{1} French Land Register data, which excludes lakes, ponds, glaciers > 1 km^{2} (0.386 sq mi or 247 acres) and river estuaries.

Yvignac-la-Tour (French pronunciation: [iviɲak la tuʁ]; Breton: Ivinieg, before 1999: Yvignac) is a commune in the Côtes-d'Armor department of the region in Brittany in northwestern France.

== The church ==
One of Yvignac's most prominent landmarks, reflected in the town's name, is the tall tower of its church. This tower is not a steeple, tapering to a point, but has a flat roof. Also inside the church at the back entrance is a large old coffin, and a wall. This wall is split into three sections, the top sowing a grail, possibly being the Holy Grail. The bottom left is a shield and sword, on the shield is a cross, this could be a major artifact, we know that this could point to the Knights Templars. the last bit of the shield was faded.

== Population ==
The inhabitants of Yvignac-la-Tour are known in French as yvignacais.

Historical population
Year	Pop.	±% p.a.
1968	1,326	—
1975	1,167	−1.81%
1982	1,146	−0.26%
1990	1,065	−0.91%
1999	1,091	+0.27%
2007	1,146	+0.62%
2012	1,204	+0.99%
2017	1,166	−0.64%
2023	1,135	−0.45%
Source: INSEE

== International relations ==
It is twinned with the town of Ivenack in Germany.

== See also ==
- Communes of the Côtes-d'Armor department
