= Trémeur =

Trémeur Treveur
- Commune
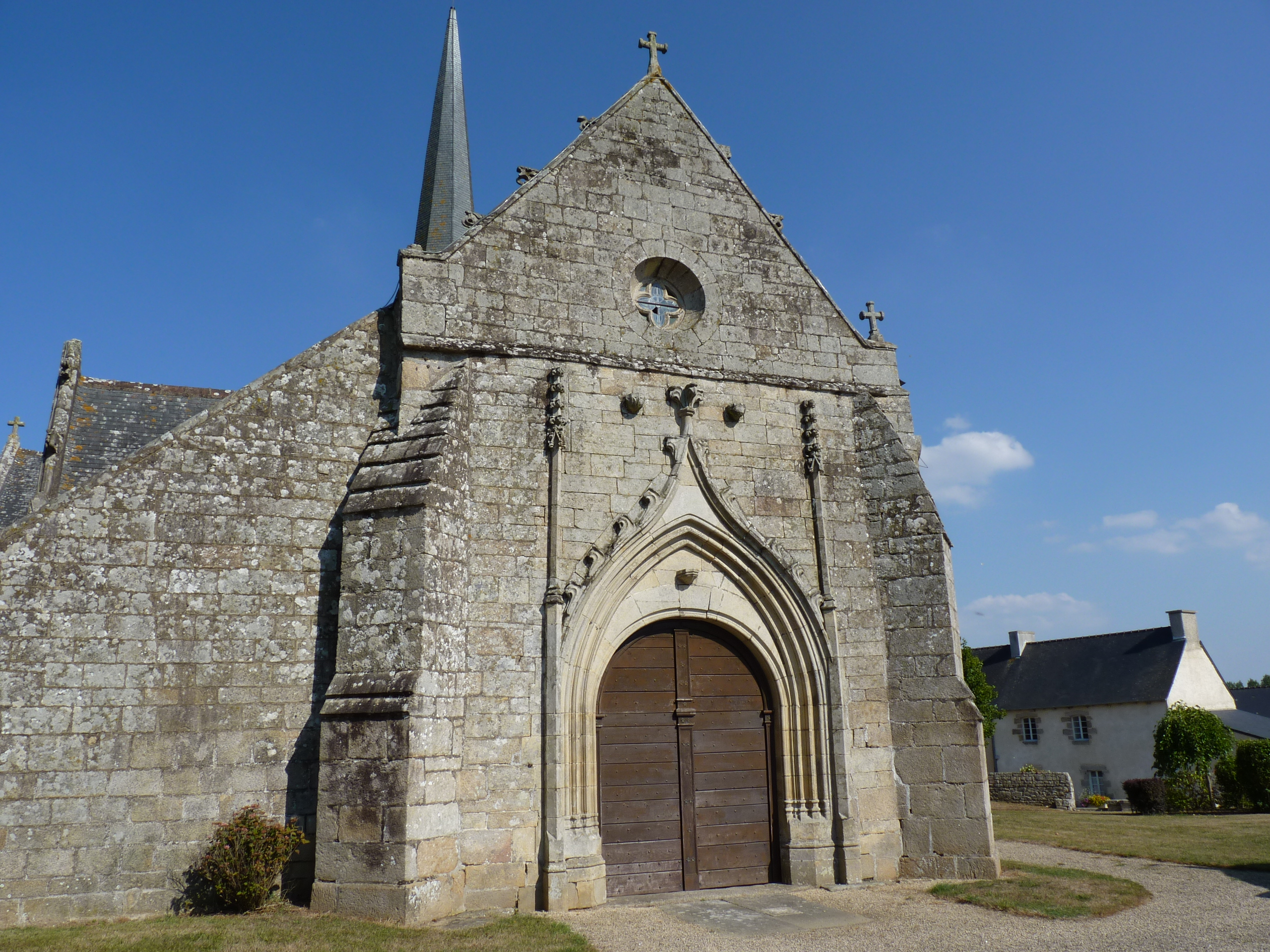
- The church of Saint-Pierre, in Trémeur

- Coat of arms
- Location of Trémeur
- Location within France Location within Brittany
- Coordinates: 48°20′54″N 2°15′45″W
- Country: France
- Region: Brittany
- Department: Côtes-d'Armor
- Arrondissement: Saint-Brieuc
- Canton: Broons
- Intercommunality: CA Lamballe Terre et Mer

Government
  - Mayor (2024–2026): Guy Corbel
- Area^{1}: 14.56 km^{2} (5.62 sq mi)
- Highest elevation: 87 m (285 ft)
- Lowest elevation: 30 m (98 ft)
- Population (2023): 809
  - Density: 55.6/km^{2} (144/sq mi)
- Time zone: UTC+01:00 (CET)
  - Summer (DST): UTC+02:00 (CEST)
- INSEE/Postal code: 22369 /22250
- ^{1} French Land Register data, which excludes lakes, ponds, glaciers > 1 km^{2} (0.386 sq mi or 247 acres) and river estuaries.

Trémeur (French pronunciation: [tʁemœʁ]; Breton: Treveur) is a commune in the Côtes-d'Armor department of Brittany in northwestern France.

== Population ==
Historical population
Year	Pop.	±% p.a.
1968	658	—
1975	592	−1.50%
1982	595	+0.07%
1990	613	+0.37%
1999	627	+0.25%
2007	688	+1.17%
2012	692	+0.12%
2017	764	+2.00%
2023	809	+0.96%
Source: INSEE

Inhabitants of Trémeur are called trémeurois in French.

== See also ==
- Communes of the Côtes-d'Armor department
