= Plumaudan =

Plumaudan Pluvaodan
- Commune
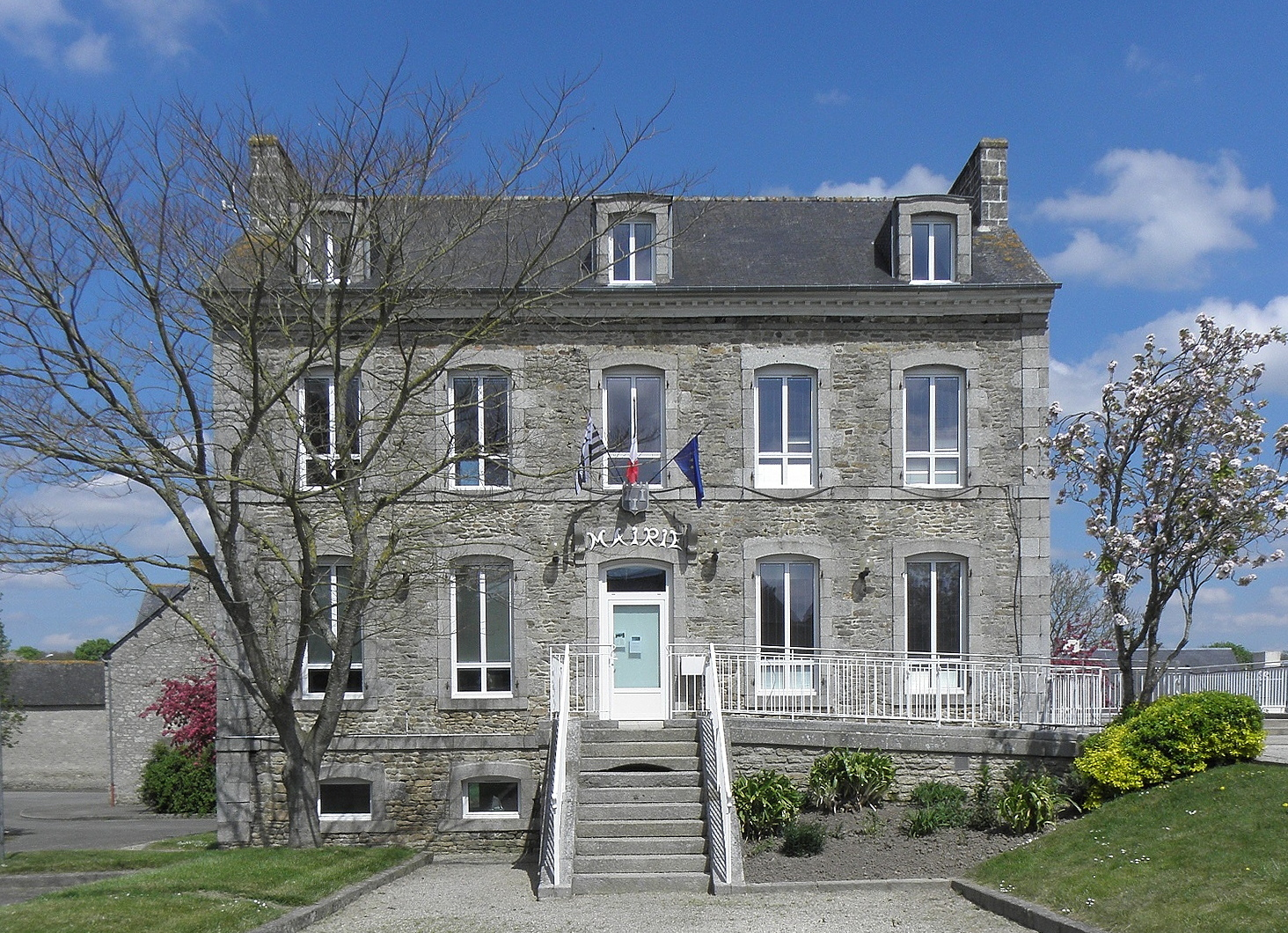
- The town hall in Plumaudan

- Coat of arms
- Location of Plumaudan
- Location within France Location within Brittany
- Coordinates: 48°21′31″N 2°07′24″W
- Country: France
- Region: Brittany
- Department: Côtes-d'Armor
- Arrondissement: Dinan
- Canton: Broons
- Intercommunality: Dinan Agglomération

Government
  - Mayor (2020–2026): Laurence Gallée
- Area^{1}: 17.83 km^{2} (6.88 sq mi)
- Highest elevation: 130 m (430 ft)
- Lowest elevation: 37 m (121 ft)
- Population (2023): 1,421
  - Density: 79.70/km^{2} (206.4/sq mi)
- Time zone: UTC+01:00 (CET)
  - Summer (DST): UTC+02:00 (CEST)
- INSEE/Postal code: 22239 /22350
- ^{1} French Land Register data, which excludes lakes, ponds, glaciers > 1 km^{2} (0.386 sq mi or 247 acres) and river estuaries.

Plumaudan (French pronunciation: [plymodɑ̃]; Breton: Pluvaodan; Gallo: Ploemaudan) is a commune in the Côtes-d'Armor department of Brittany in northwestern France.

== Population ==
Historical population
Year	Pop.	±% p.a.
1968	808	—
1975	770	−0.69%
1982	737	−0.62%
1990	787	+0.82%
1999	841	+0.74%
2007	1,010	+2.32%
2012	1,185	+3.25%
2017	1,288	+1.68%
2023	1,421	+1.65%
Source: INSEE

People from Plumaudan are called plumaudanais or plumaudannais in French.

== See also ==
- Communes of the Côtes-d'Armor department
