= Éréac =

Éréac Erieg
- Commune
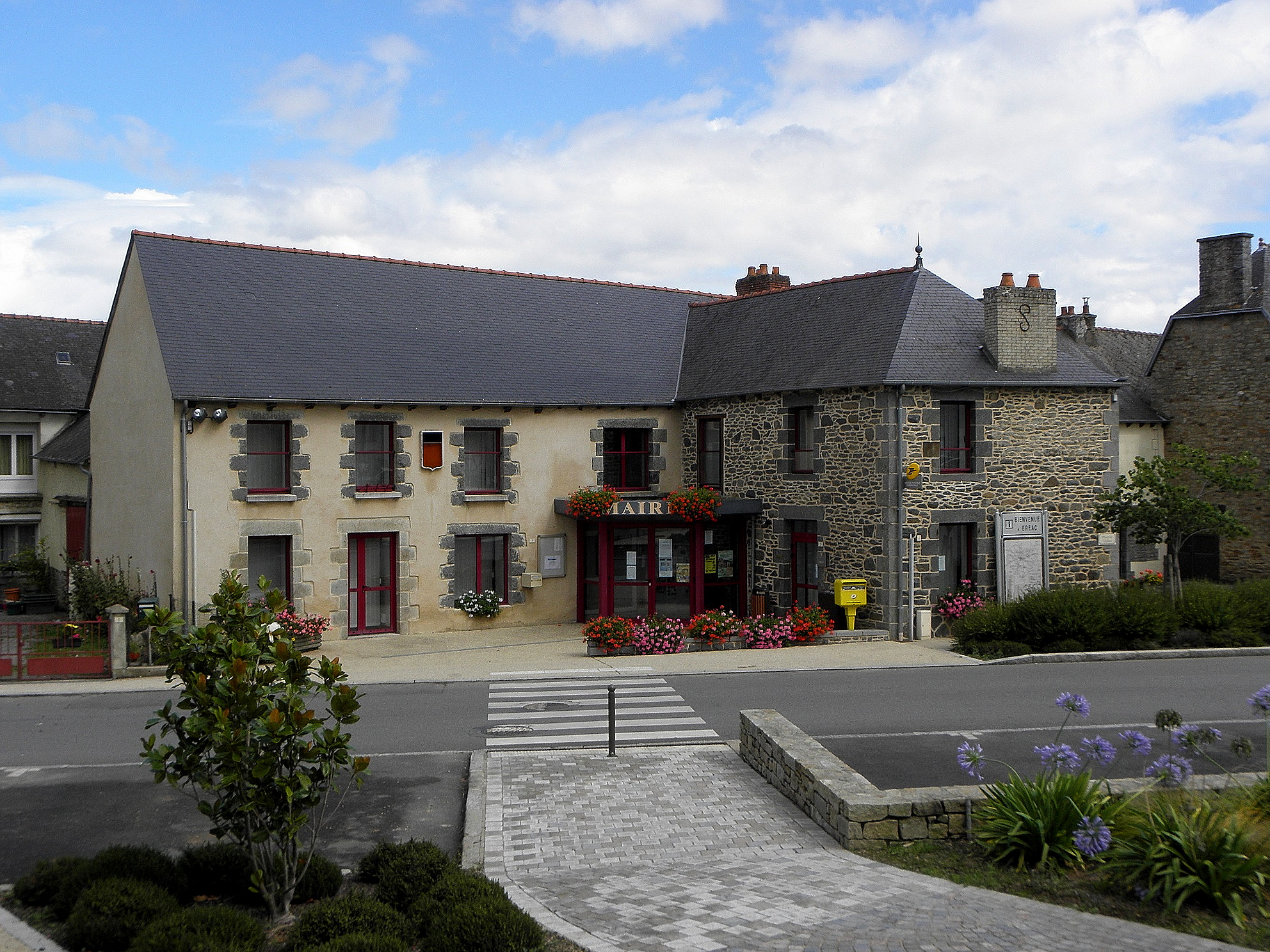
- The town hall of Éréac

- Coat of arms
- Location of Éréac
- Location within France Location within Brittany
- Coordinates: 48°16′29″N 2°20′47″W
- Country: France
- Region: Brittany
- Department: Côtes-d'Armor
- Arrondissement: Saint-Brieuc
- Canton: Broons
- Intercommunality: CA Lamballe Terre et Mer

Government
  - Mayor (2026–32): Christophe Marchand
- Area^{1}: 21.21 km^{2} (8.19 sq mi)
- Highest elevation: 179 m (587 ft)
- Lowest elevation: 91 m (299 ft)
- Population (2023): 675
  - Density: 31.8/km^{2} (82.4/sq mi)
- Time zone: UTC+01:00 (CET)
  - Summer (DST): UTC+02:00 (CEST)
- INSEE/Postal code: 22053 /22250
- ^{1} French Land Register data, which excludes lakes, ponds, glaciers > 1 km^{2} (0.386 sq mi or 247 acres) and river estuaries.

Éréac (French pronunciation: [eʁeak]; Breton: Erieg; Gallo: Ériac) is a commune in the Côtes-d'Armor department of Brittany in northwestern France.

== Population ==
Historical population
Year	Pop.	±% p.a.
1968	921	—
1975	817	−1.70%
1982	736	−1.48%
1990	706	−0.52%
1999	600	−1.79%
2007	619	+0.39%
2012	674	+1.72%
2017	682	+0.24%
2023	675	−0.17%
Source: INSEE

Inhabitants of Éréac are called éréacais in French.

== See also ==
- Communes of the Côtes-d'Armor department
