= Loscouët-sur-Meu =

Loscouët-sur-Meu Loskoed-ar-Mozon
- Commune
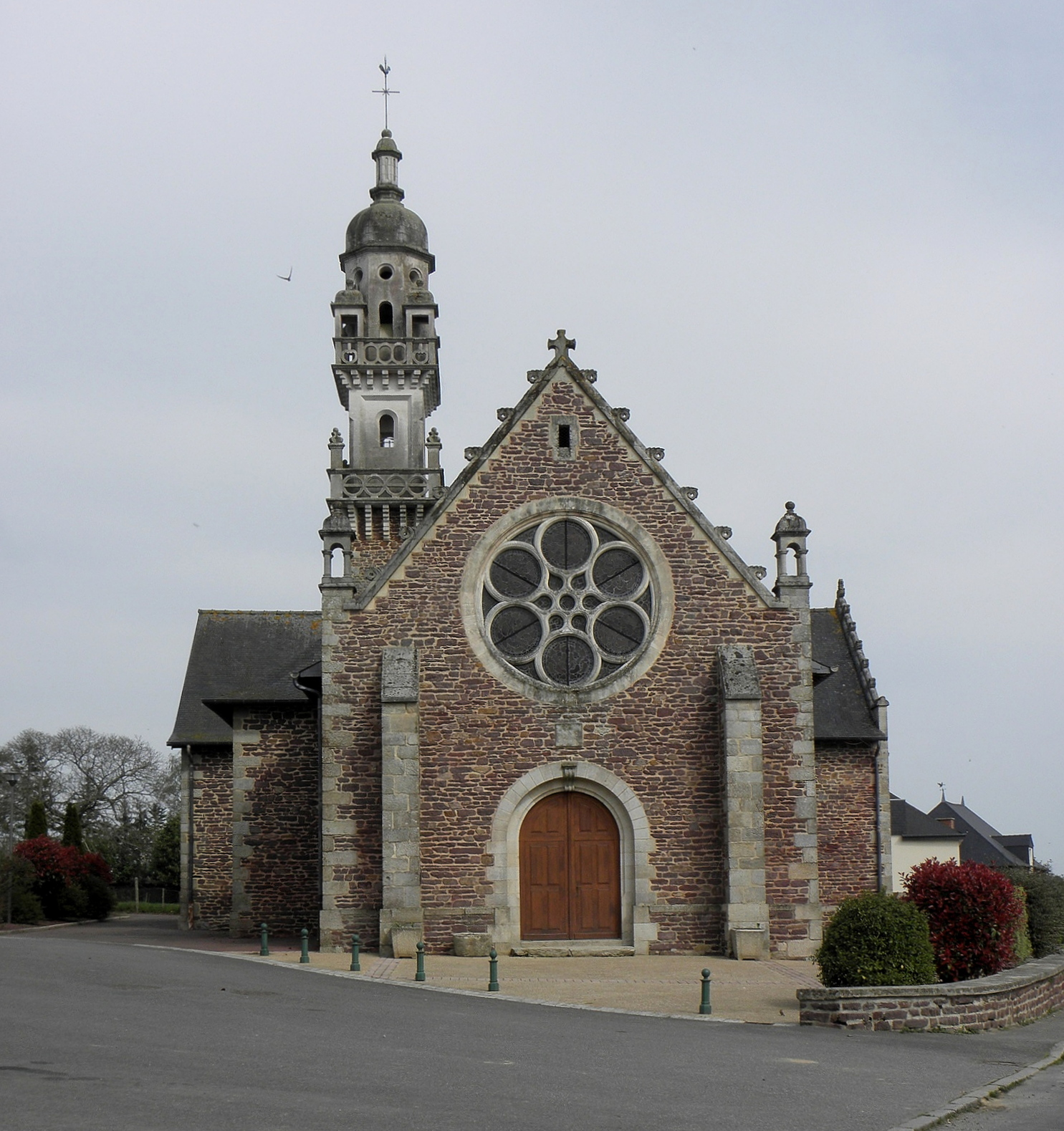
- The church of Saint-Lunaire
- Location of Loscouët-sur-Meu
- Location within France Location within Brittany
- Coordinates: 48°10′43″N 2°14′27″W
- Country: France
- Region: Brittany
- Department: Côtes-d'Armor
- Arrondissement: Saint-Brieuc
- Canton: Broons

Government
  - Mayor (2020–2026): Marcel Pichot
- Area^{1}: 22.26 km^{2} (8.59 sq mi)
- Highest elevation: 131 m (430 ft)
- Lowest elevation: 66 m (217 ft)
- Population (2023): 659
  - Density: 29.6/km^{2} (76.7/sq mi)
- Time zone: UTC+01:00 (CET)
  - Summer (DST): UTC+02:00 (CEST)
- INSEE/Postal code: 22133 /22230
- ^{1} French Land Register data, which excludes lakes, ponds, glaciers > 1 km^{2} (0.386 sq mi or 247 acres) and river estuaries.

Loscouët-sur-Meu (French pronunciation: [lɔskwɛt syʁ mø], literally Loscouët on Meu; Breton: Loskoed-ar-Mozon) is a commune in the Côtes-d'Armor department of Brittany in northwestern France.

== Geography ==
The River Meu flows southeast through the middle of the commune, which is reflected in the name of the latter.

== Population ==
Historical population
Year	Pop.	±% p.a.
1968	700	—
1975	653	−0.99%
1982	622	−0.69%
1990	631	+0.18%
1999	603	−0.50%
2007	648	+0.90%
2012	643	−0.15%
2017	629	−0.44%
2023	659	+0.78%
Source: INSEE

Inhabitants of Loscouët-sur-Meu are called loscoetais in French.

== See also ==
- Communes of the Côtes-d'Armor department
