= Saint-Launeuc =

Saint-Launeuc Sant-Laoueneg
- Part of Merdrignac
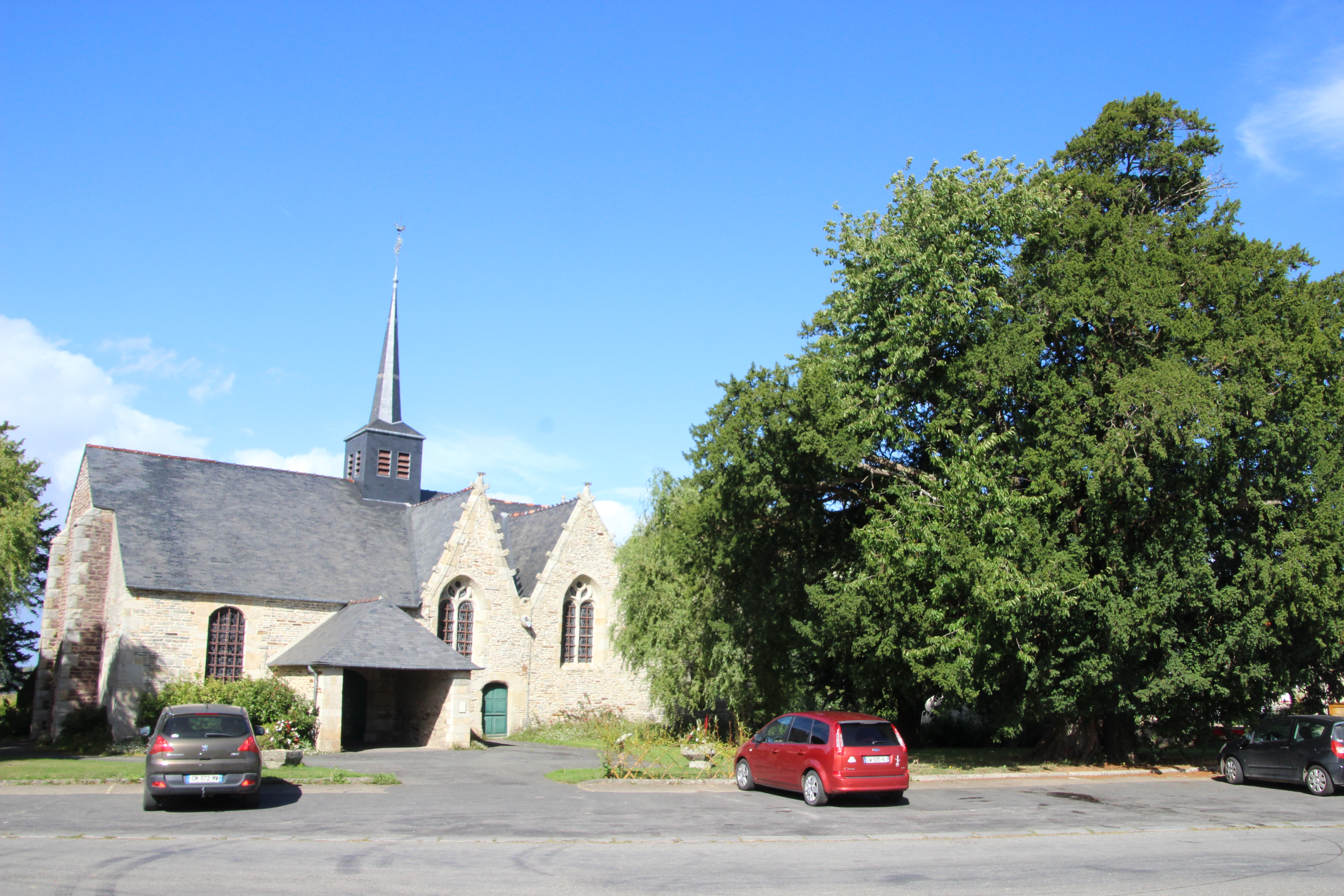
- The church of Saint Leonore
- Location of Saint-Launeuc
- Location within France Location within Brittany
- Coordinates: 48°14′04″N 2°22′28″W
- Country: France
- Region: Brittany
- Department: Côtes-d'Armor
- Arrondissement: Saint-Brieuc
- Canton: Broons
- Commune: Merdrignac
- Area^{1}: 11.58 km^{2} (4.47 sq mi)
- Highest elevation: 159 m (522 ft)
- Lowest elevation: 104 m (341 ft)
- Population (2022): 190
  - Density: 16/km^{2} (42/sq mi)
- Time zone: UTC+01:00 (CET)
  - Summer (DST): UTC+02:00 (CEST)
- Postal code: 22230
- ^{1} French Land Register data, which excludes lakes, ponds, glaciers > 1 km^{2} (0.386 sq mi or 247 acres) and river estuaries.

Saint-Launeuc (French pronunciation: [sɛ̃ lonœk]; Breton: Sant-Laoueneg) is a former commune in the Côtes-d'Armor department of Brittany in northwestern France. On 1 January 2025, it was merged into the commune of Merdrignac.

== Geography ==
The river Meu forms the commune's southern border. The Rance forms the commune's northern border.

== Population ==
Inhabitants of Saint-Launeuc are called launeucois in French.

== See also ==
- Communes of the Côtes-d'Armor department
