= Lanrelas =

Lanrelas Lanrelaz
- Commune
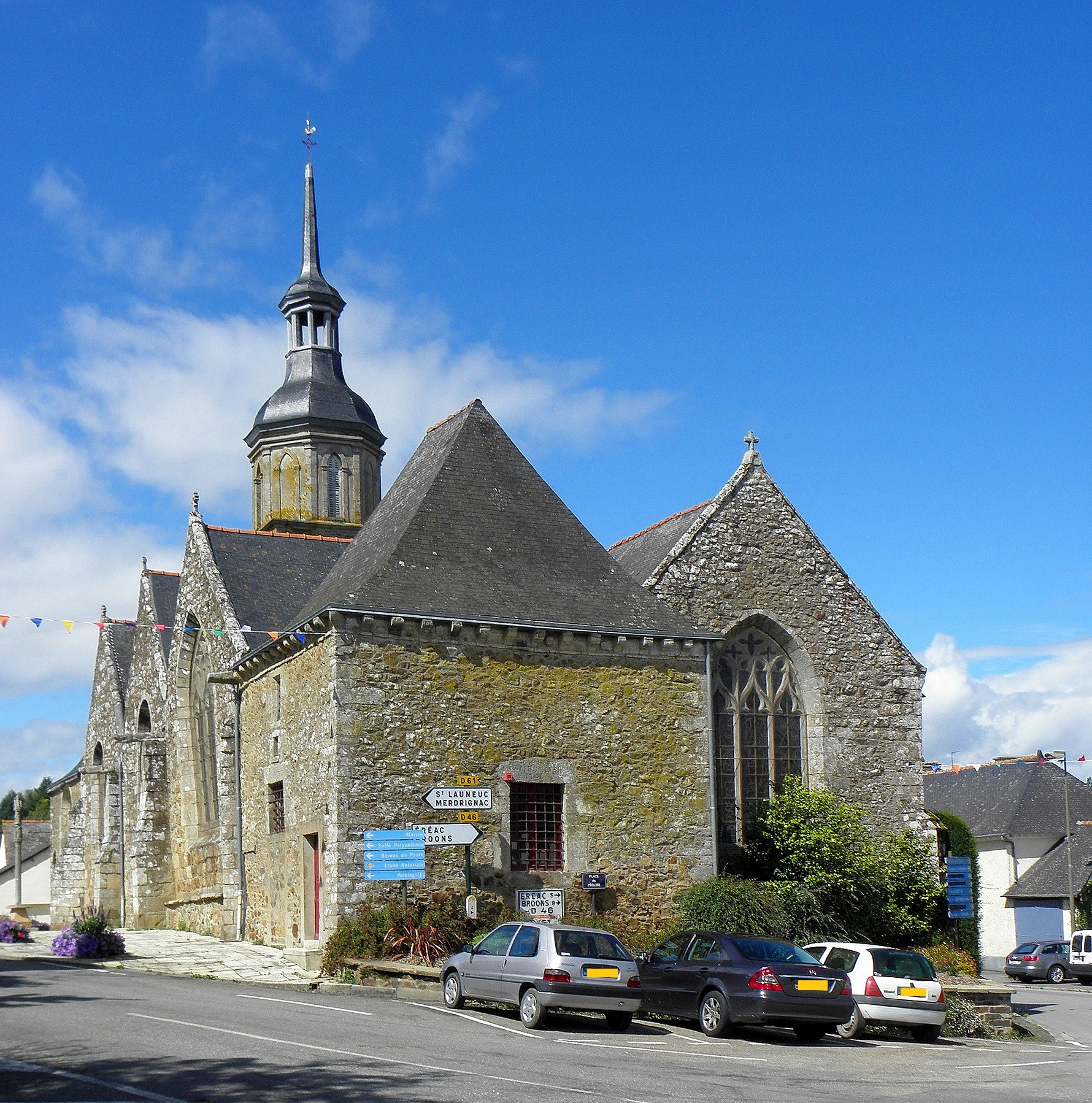
- The church of Saint-Jean-Baptiste, in Lanrelas

- Coat of arms
- Location of Lanrelas
- Location within France Location within Brittany
- Coordinates: 48°15′09″N 2°17′32″W
- Country: France
- Region: Brittany
- Department: Côtes-d'Armor
- Arrondissement: Saint-Brieuc
- Canton: Broons
- Intercommunality: CA Lamballe Terre et Mer

Government
  - Mayor (2020–2026): Yves Lemoine
- Area^{1}: 29.40 km^{2} (11.35 sq mi)
- Highest elevation: 145 m (476 ft)
- Lowest elevation: 80 m (260 ft)
- Population (2023): 874
  - Density: 29.7/km^{2} (77.0/sq mi)
- Time zone: UTC+01:00 (CET)
  - Summer (DST): UTC+02:00 (CEST)
- INSEE/Postal code: 22114 /22250
- ^{1} French Land Register data, which excludes lakes, ponds, glaciers > 1 km^{2} (0.386 sq mi or 247 acres) and river estuaries.

Lanrelas (French pronunciation: [lɑ̃ʁəla]; Breton: Lanrelaz) is a commune in the Côtes-d'Armor department of Brittany in northwestern France.

== Population ==
Historical population
| Year | Pop. | ±% p.a. |
|---|---|---|
| 1968 | 1,234 | — |
| 1975 | 1,126 | −1.30% |
| 1982 | 1,061 | −0.85% |
| 1990 | 916 | −1.82% |
| 1999 | 868 | −0.60% |
| 2007 | 852 | −0.23% |
| 2012 | 833 | −0.45% |
| 2017 | 837 | +0.10% |
| 2023 | 874 | +0.72% |
Source: INSEE

Inhabitants of Lanrelas are called lanrelasiens in French.

== See also ==
- Communes of the Côtes-d'Armor department

== Notable people ==
- Pierre-Mathurin Gillet (1762-1795), revolutionary politician
