= Gomené =

Gomené Gouvene
- Commune
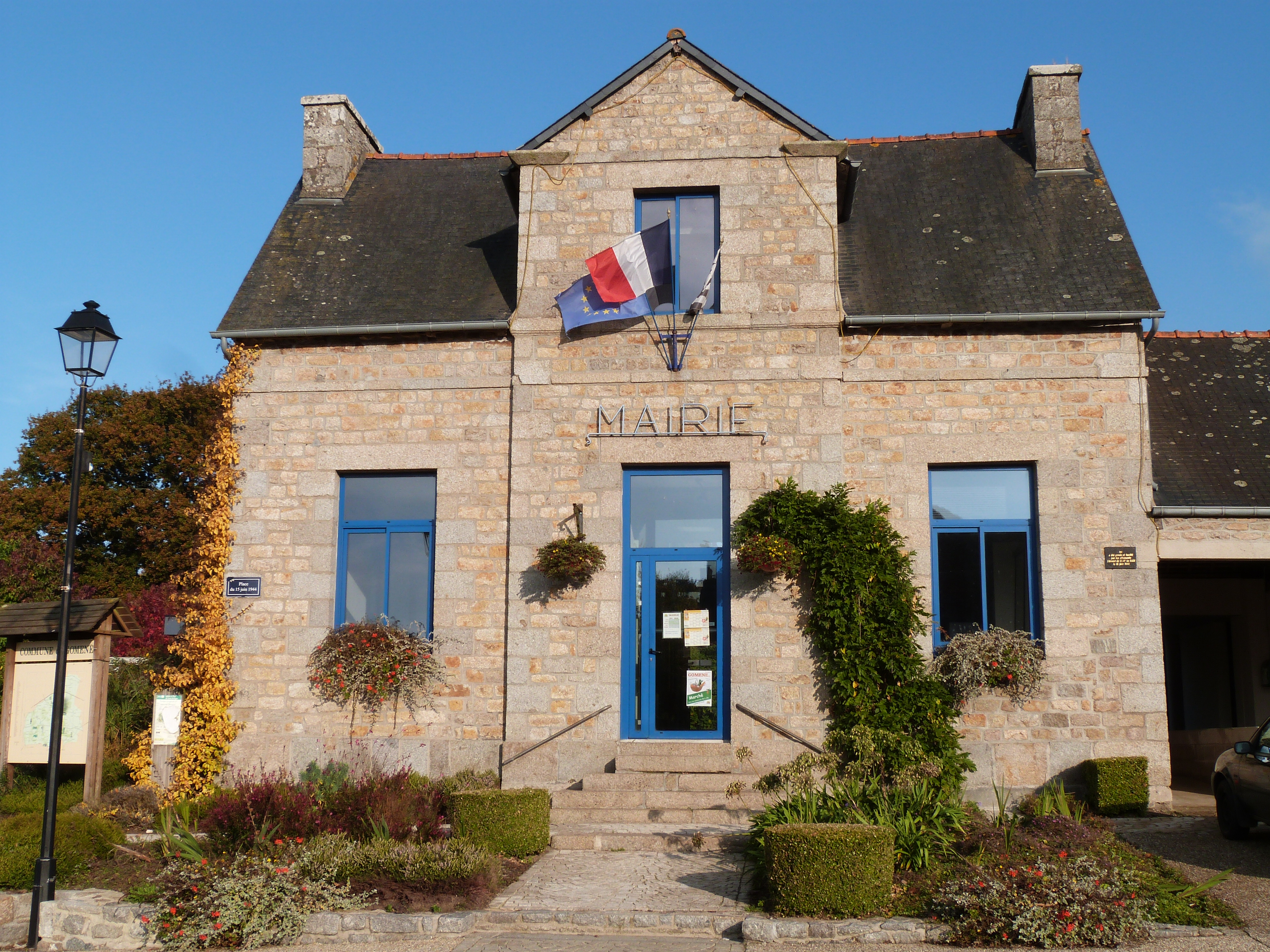
- The town hall of Gomené

- Coat of arms
- Location of Gomené
- Location within France Location within Brittany
- Coordinates: 48°10′29″N 2°29′09″W
- Country: France
- Region: Brittany
- Department: Côtes-d'Armor
- Arrondissement: Saint-Brieuc
- Canton: Broons

Government
  - Mayor (2020–2026): Mickaël Leveau
- Area^{1}: 25.37 km^{2} (9.80 sq mi)
- Highest elevation: 221 m (725 ft)
- Lowest elevation: 104 m (341 ft)
- Population (2023): 560
  - Density: 22/km^{2} (57/sq mi)
- Time zone: UTC+01:00 (CET)
  - Summer (DST): UTC+02:00 (CEST)
- INSEE/Postal code: 22062 /22230
- ^{1} French Land Register data, which excludes lakes, ponds, glaciers > 1 km^{2} (0.386 sq mi or 247 acres) and river estuaries.

Gomené (French pronunciation: [ɡɔmne]; Breton: Gouvene; Gallo: Gómenaé) is a commune in the Côtes-d'Armor department of Brittany in northwestern France.

== Population ==
Inhabitants of Gomené are called goménéens in French.

Historical population
Year	Pop.	±% p.a.
1968	718	—
1975	647	−1.48%
1982	596	−1.17%
1990	535	−1.34%
1999	539	+0.08%
2007	592	+1.18%
2012	561	−1.07%
2017	546	−0.54%
2023	560	+0.42%
Source: INSEE

== See also ==
- Communes of the Côtes-d'Armor department
