= Merdrignac =

Merdrignac Medrigneg
- Commune
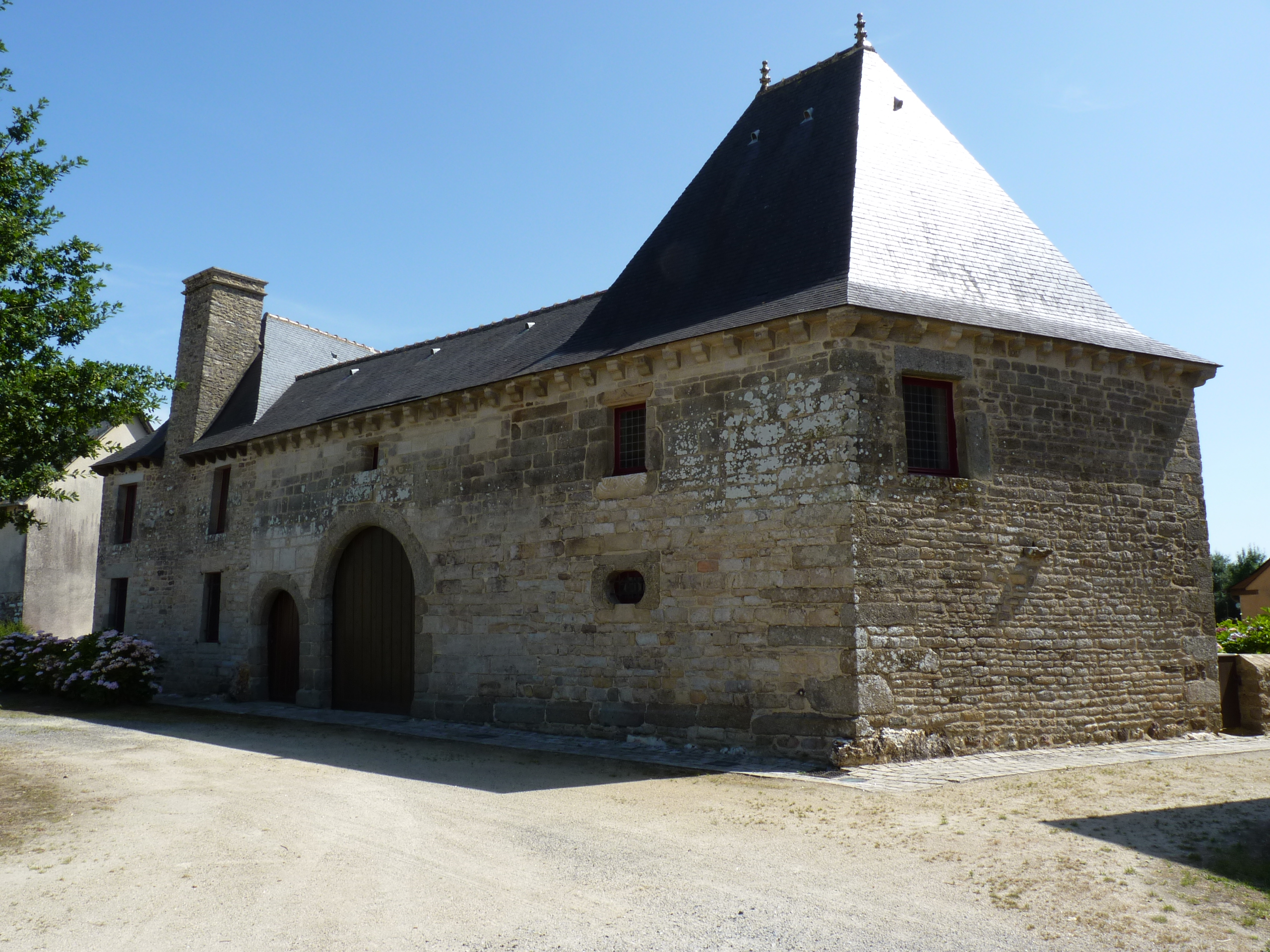
- The manor of the old village of Merdrignac

- Flag Coat of arms
- Location of Merdrignac
- Location within France Location within Brittany
- Coordinates: 48°11′36″N 2°24′47″W
- Country: France
- Region: Brittany
- Department: Côtes-d'Armor
- Arrondissement: Saint-Brieuc
- Canton: Broons
- Intercommunality: Loudéac Communauté - Bretagne Centre

Government
  - Mayor (2020–2026): Eric Robin
- Area^{1}: 68.70 km^{2} (26.53 sq mi)
- Highest elevation: 196 m (643 ft)
- Lowest elevation: 77 m (253 ft)
- Population (2023): 3,139
  - Density: 45.69/km^{2} (118.3/sq mi)
- Time zone: UTC+01:00 (CET)
  - Summer (DST): UTC+02:00 (CEST)
- INSEE/Postal code: 22147 /22230
- ^{1} French Land Register data, which excludes lakes, ponds, glaciers > 1 km^{2} (0.386 sq mi or 247 acres) and river estuaries.

Merdrignac (French pronunciation: [mɛʁdʁiɲak]; Breton: Medrigneg) is a commune in the Côtes-d'Armor department of Brittany in northwestern France. On 1 January 2025, the former commune of Saint-Launeuc was merged into Merdrignac.

The commune is listed as a Village étape.

== Geography ==
The River Meu forms most of the commune's northern border.

=== Climate ===
Merdrignac has an oceanic climate (Köppen climate classification Cfb). The average annual temperature in Merdrignac is 11.5 °C (52.7 °F). The average annual rainfall is 931.5 mm (36.67 in) with December as the wettest month. The temperatures are highest on average in July, at around 17.9 °C (64.2 °F), and lowest in December, at around 5.5 °C (41.9 °F). The highest temperature ever recorded in Merdrignac was 39.2 °C (102.6 °F) on 5 August 2003; the coldest temperature ever recorded was −8.3 °C (17.1 °F) on 12 January 2010.

Climate data for Merdrignac (1981–2010 averages, extremes 1998−present)
Month	Jan	Feb	Mar	Apr	May	Jun	Jul	Aug	Sep	Oct	Nov	Dec	Year
Record high °C (°F)	17.7 (63.9)	22.0 (71.6)	23.5 (74.3)	27.2 (81.0)	30.5 (86.9)	34.4 (93.9)	36.4 (97.5)	39.2 (102.6)	31.7 (89.1)	29.0 (84.2)	20.3 (68.5)	16.2 (61.2)	39.2 (102.6)
Mean daily maximum °C (°F)	8.6 (47.5)	9.5 (49.1)	12.1 (53.8)	15.0 (59.0)	18.4 (65.1)	22.0 (71.6)	23.3 (73.9)	23.1 (73.6)	21.1 (70.0)	16.5 (61.7)	11.8 (53.2)	8.4 (47.1)	15.8 (60.4)
Daily mean °C (°F)	5.6 (42.1)	6.2 (43.2)	8.1 (46.6)	10.2 (50.4)	13.5 (56.3)	16.6 (61.9)	17.9 (64.2)	17.8 (64.0)	15.7 (60.3)	12.4 (54.3)	8.4 (47.1)	5.5 (41.9)	11.5 (52.7)
Mean daily minimum °C (°F)	2.7 (36.9)	3.0 (37.4)	4.0 (39.2)	5.5 (41.9)	8.6 (47.5)	11.2 (52.2)	12.6 (54.7)	12.5 (54.5)	10.4 (50.7)	8.4 (47.1)	5.1 (41.2)	2.7 (36.9)	7.2 (45.0)
Record low °C (°F)	−8.3 (17.1)	−7.6 (18.3)	−7.0 (19.4)	−2.6 (27.3)	−0.8 (30.6)	3.0 (37.4)	4.9 (40.8)	5.5 (41.9)	1.7 (35.1)	−1.9 (28.6)	−6.5 (20.3)	−7.8 (18.0)	−8.3 (17.1)
Average precipitation mm (inches)	97.0 (3.82)	73.9 (2.91)	80.9 (3.19)	64.9 (2.56)	68.0 (2.68)	40.0 (1.57)	73.5 (2.89)	56.8 (2.24)	60.2 (2.37)	104.6 (4.12)	105.0 (4.13)	106.7 (4.20)	931.5 (36.67)
Average precipitation days (≥ 1.0 mm)	15.0	12.6	12.8	11.3	11.1	6.8	9.8	7.9	8.1	13.6	14.5	14.9	138.5
Source: Meteociel

== Population ==
Inhabitants of Merdrignac are called merdrignaciens in French.

Historical population
Year	Pop.	±% p.a.
1968	2,576	—
1975	2,704	+0.70%
1982	2,780	+0.40%
1990	2,791	+0.05%
1999	2,830	+0.15%
2007	2,921	+0.40%
2012	2,895	−0.18%
2017	2,930	+0.24%
2023	3,139	+1.15%
Source: INSEE

== See also ==
- Communes of the Côtes-d'Armor department
