= Illifaut =

Illifaut Ilifav
- Commune
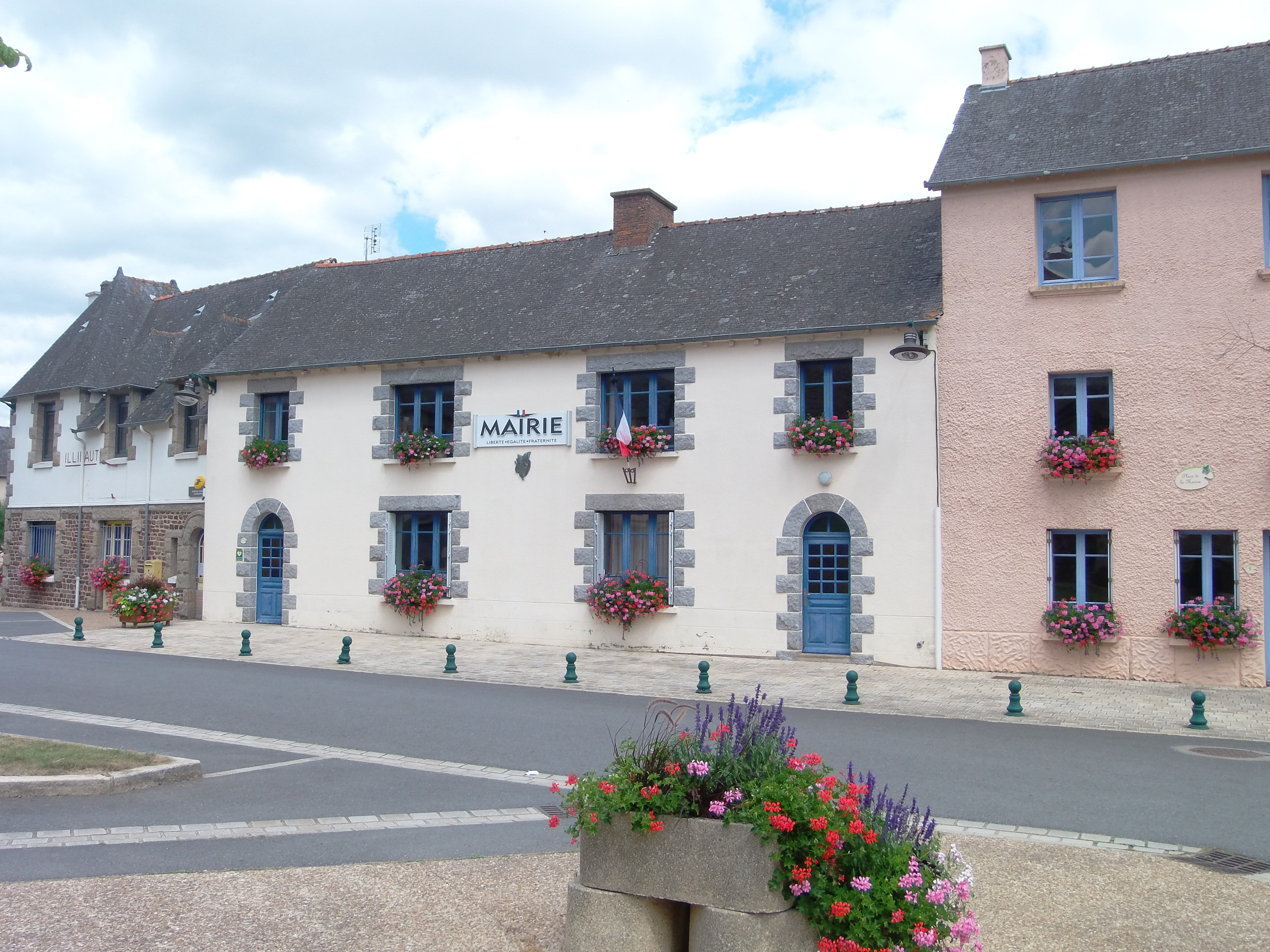
- The town hall of Illifaut
- Location of Illifaut
- Location within France Location within Brittany
- Coordinates: 48°08′49″N 2°20′50″W
- Country: France
- Region: Brittany
- Department: Côtes-d'Armor
- Arrondissement: Saint-Brieuc
- Canton: Broons

Government
  - Mayor (2020–2026): Dominique Viel
- Area^{1}: 26.71 km^{2} (10.31 sq mi)
- Highest elevation: 123 m (404 ft)
- Lowest elevation: 67 m (220 ft)
- Population (2023): 706
  - Density: 26.4/km^{2} (68.5/sq mi)
- Time zone: UTC+01:00 (CET)
  - Summer (DST): UTC+02:00 (CEST)
- INSEE/Postal code: 22083 /22230
- ^{1} French Land Register data, which excludes lakes, ponds, glaciers > 1 km^{2} (0.386 sq mi or 247 acres) and river estuaries.

Illifaut (French pronunciation: [ilifo]; Breton: Ilifav; Gallo: Ilifaut) is a commune in the Côtes-d'Armor department of Brittany in northwestern France.

== Population ==
Historical population
Year	Pop.	±% p.a.
1968	960	—
1975	844	−1.82%
1982	812	−0.55%
1990	757	−0.87%
1999	632	−1.99%
2007	681	+0.94%
2012	696	+0.44%
2017	690	−0.17%
2023	706	+0.38%
Source: INSEE

The inhabitants of Illifaut are known in French as illifautais.

== See also ==
- Communes of the Côtes-d'Armor department
