= Meu =

River in France

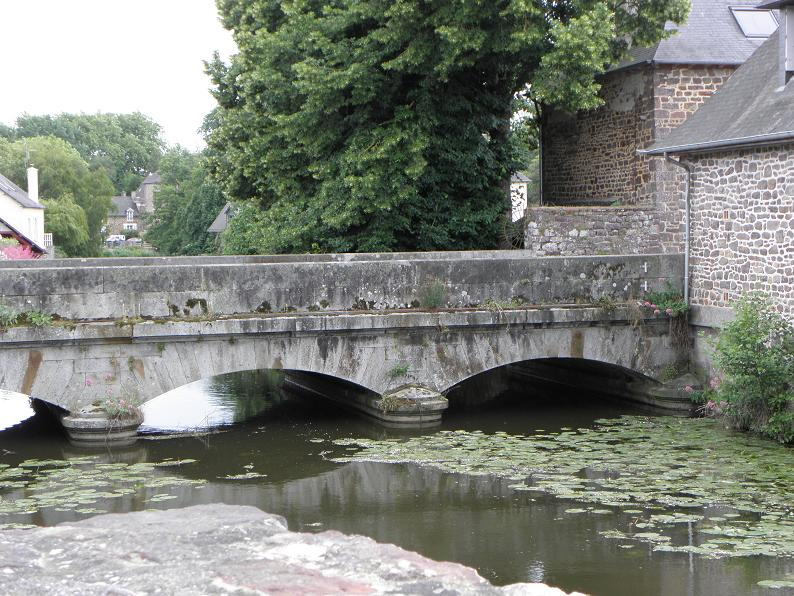
- The river Meu at Montfort-sur-Meu

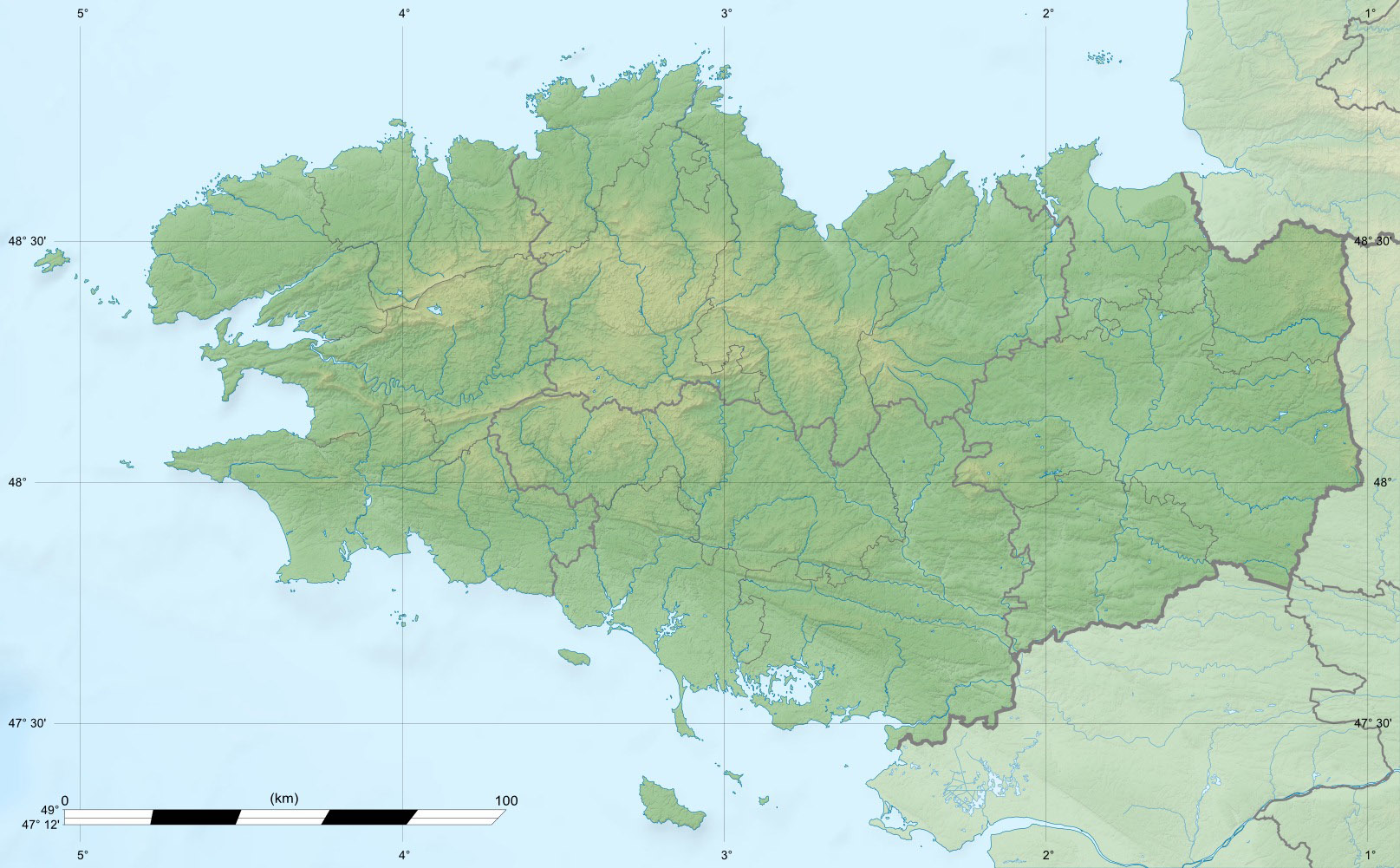
- Location within France Location within Brittany

Location
- Country: France

Physical characteristics
- Source
  - location: near Saint-Vran
  - coordinates: 48°14′23″N 02°28′25″W
  - elevation: 225 m (738 ft)
- Mouth
  - location: Vilaine
  - coordinates: 48°01′54″N 01°46′36″W
  - elevation: 17 m (56 ft)
- Length: 84.1 km (52.3 mi)
- Basin size: 468 km^{2} (181 sq mi)
- Discharge
  - average: 3.13 m^{3}/s (111 cu ft/s)

Basin features
- Progression: Vilaine→ Atlantic Ocean

The Meu (French pronunciation: [mø]; Breton: Mew) is an 84.1 km (52.3 mi) long river in the Côtes-d'Armor and Ille-et-Vilaine départements, in northwestern France. Its source is at Saint-Vran, 2.4 km (1.5 mi) west of the village. It flows generally southeast. It is a right tributary of the Vilaine into which it flows at Goven, 5.7 km (3.5 mi) northeast of the village.

== Départements and communes along its course ==
This list is ordered from source to mouth:

- Côtes-d'Armor: Saint-Vran, Mérillac, Merdrignac, Saint-Launeuc, Trémorel, Loscouët-sur-Meu
- Ille-et-Vilaine: Gaël, Muel, Bléruais, Saint-Maugan, Saint-Gonlay, Iffendic, Montfort-sur-Meu, Breteil, Talensac, Cintré, Mordelles, Bréal-sous-Montfort, Chavagne, Goven
