= Trémorel =

Trémorel Tremorae
- Commune
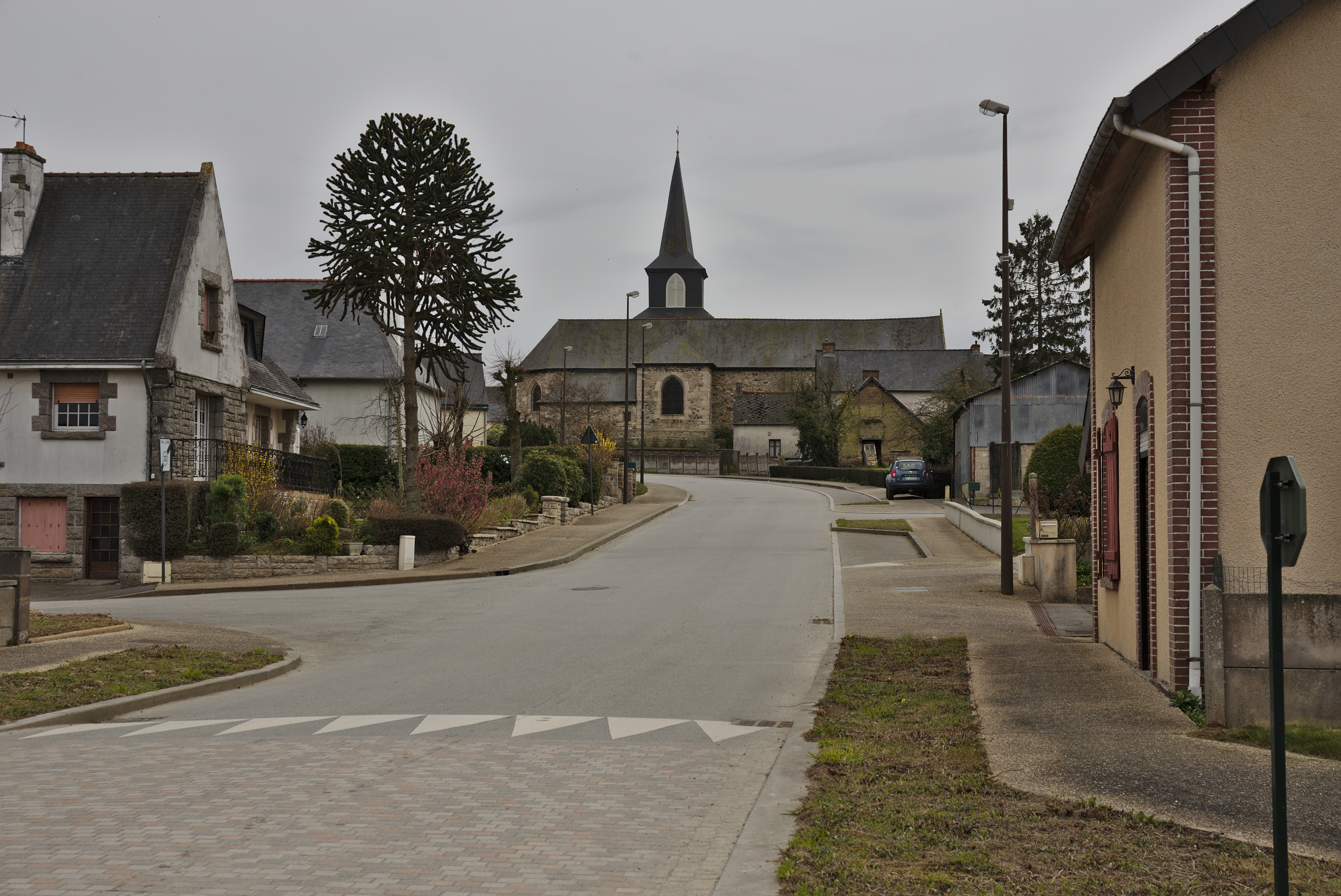
- The centre of Trémorel
- Location of Trémorel
- Location within France Location within Brittany
- Coordinates: 48°12′00″N 2°17′16″W
- Country: France
- Region: Brittany
- Department: Côtes-d'Armor
- Arrondissement: Saint-Brieuc
- Canton: Broons

Government
  - Mayor (2020–2026): Michel Rouvrais
- Area^{1}: 33.76 km^{2} (13.03 sq mi)
- Highest elevation: 144 m (472 ft)
- Lowest elevation: 78 m (256 ft)
- Population (2023): 1,156
  - Density: 34.24/km^{2} (88.69/sq mi)
- Time zone: UTC+01:00 (CET)
  - Summer (DST): UTC+02:00 (CEST)
- INSEE/Postal code: 22371 /22230
- ^{1} French Land Register data, which excludes lakes, ponds, glaciers > 1 km^{2} (0.386 sq mi or 247 acres) and river estuaries.

Trémorel (French pronunciation: [tʁemɔʁɛl]; Breton: Tremorae; Gallo: Termorae) is a commune in the Côtes-d'Armor department of Brittany in northwestern France.

== Geography ==
The river Meu flows southeast through the northern part of the commune.

== Map ==
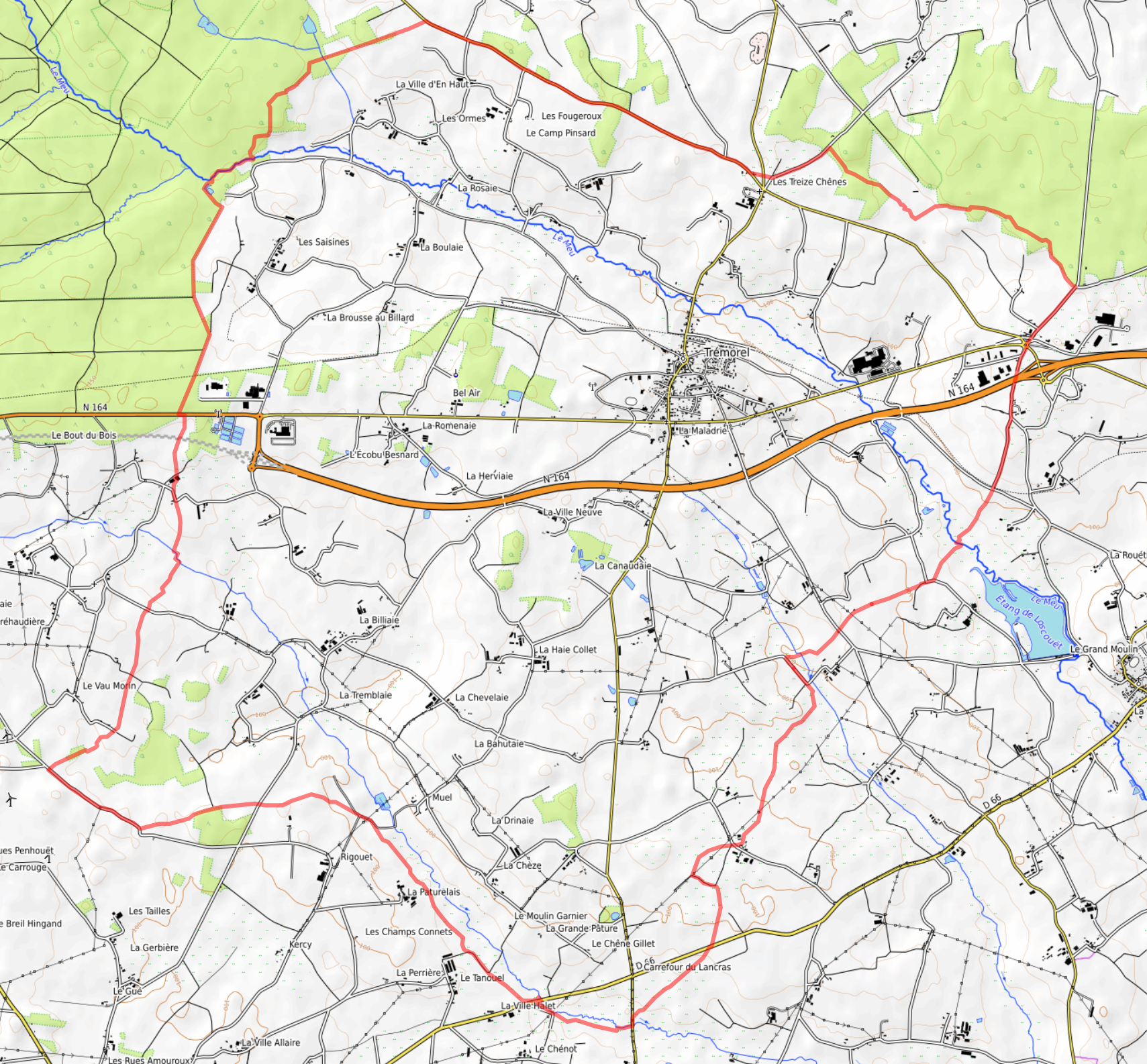
Topographic map.

== Population ==
Historical population

Year	Pop.	±% p.a.
1793	1,280	—
1800	1,242	−0.43%
1806	1,146	−1.33%
1821	1,325	+0.97%
1831	1,410	+0.62%
1836	1,323	−1.27%
1841	1,314	−0.14%
1846	1,372	+0.87%
1851	1,459	+1.24%
1856	1,405	−0.75%
1861	1,497	+1.28%
1866	1,503	+0.08%
1872	1,513	+0.11%
1876	1,538	+0.41%
1881	1,583	+0.58%
1886	1,599	+0.20%
1891	1,671	+0.88%
1896	1,739	+0.80%
1901	1,751	+0.14%

Year	Pop.	±% p.a.
1906	1,742	−0.10%
1911	1,773	+0.35%
1921	1,578	−1.16%
1926	1,595	+0.21%
1931	1,552	−0.55%
1936	1,480	−0.95%
1946	1,405	−0.52%
1954	1,293	−1.03%
1962	1,235	−0.57%
1968	1,202	−0.45%
1975	1,123	−0.97%
1982	971	−2.06%
1990	954	−0.22%
1999	915	−0.46%
2007	1,055	+1.80%
2012	1,117	+1.15%
2017	1,152	+0.62%
2023	1,156	+0.06%

Source: EHESS and INSEE (1968-2020)

Inhabitants of Trémorel are called trémorelois in French.

== See also ==
- Communes of the Côtes-d'Armor department
