= Trédias =

Trédias Trediarn
- Commune
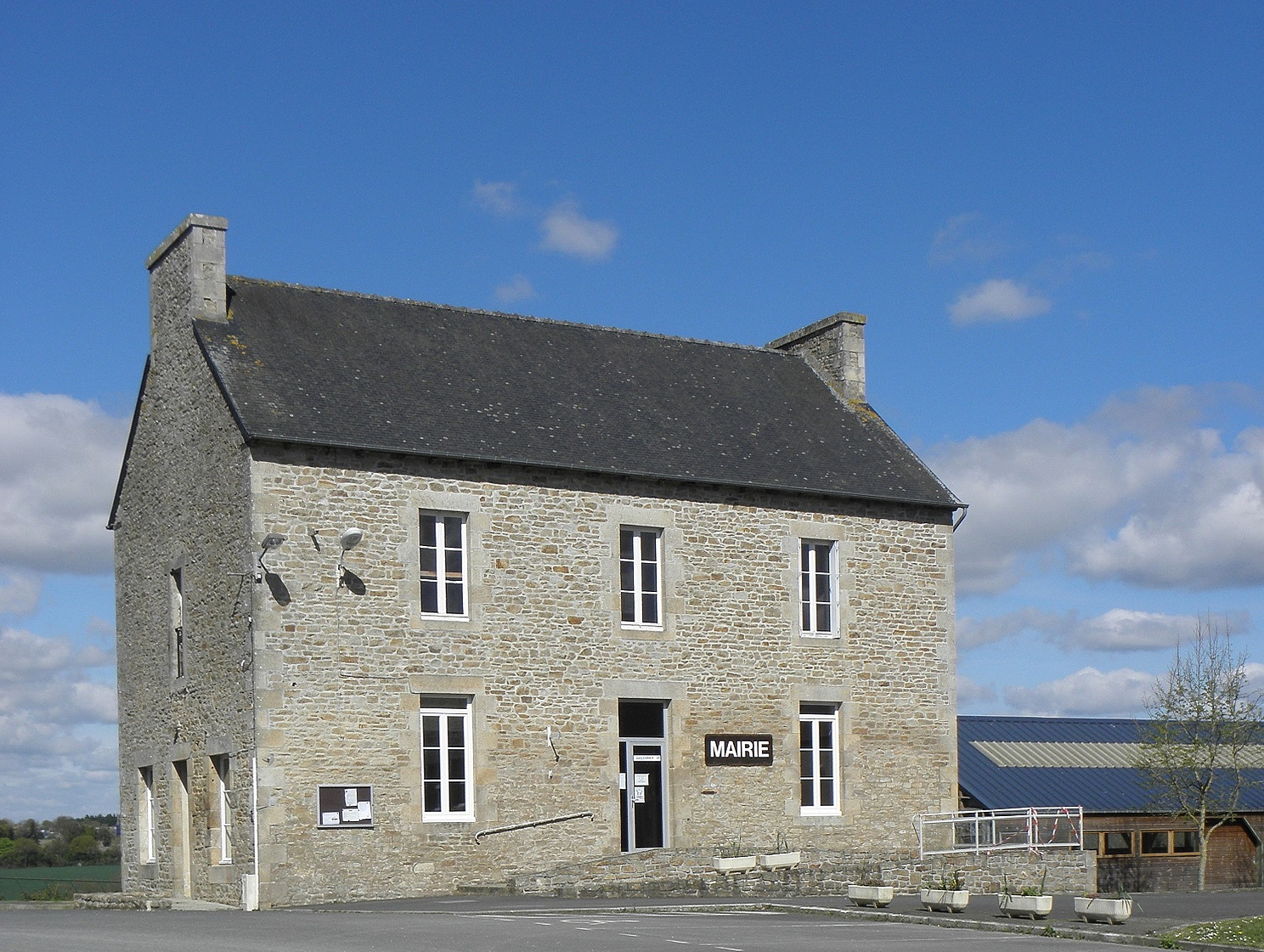
- The town hall of Trédias
- Location of Trédias
- Location within France Location within Brittany
- Coordinates: 48°21′30″N 2°14′08″W
- Country: France
- Region: Brittany
- Department: Côtes-d'Armor
- Arrondissement: Saint-Brieuc
- Canton: Broons
- Intercommunality: CA Lamballe Terre et Mer

Government
  - Mayor (2020–2026): Renaud Le Berre
- Area^{1}: 11.01 km^{2} (4.25 sq mi)
- Highest elevation: 111 m (364 ft)
- Lowest elevation: 37 m (121 ft)
- Population (2023): 513
  - Density: 46.6/km^{2} (121/sq mi)
- Time zone: UTC+01:00 (CET)
  - Summer (DST): UTC+02:00 (CEST)
- INSEE/Postal code: 22348 /22250
- ^{1} French Land Register data, which excludes lakes, ponds, glaciers > 1 km^{2} (0.386 sq mi or 247 acres) and river estuaries.

Trédias (French pronunciation: [tʁedja]; Breton: Trediarn; Gallo: Trédiarn) is a commune in the Côtes-d'Armor department of Brittany in northwestern France.

== Population ==
Historical population
Year	Pop.	±% p.a.
1968	544	—
1975	532	−0.32%
1982	510	−0.60%
1990	478	−0.81%
1999	442	−0.87%
2007	466	+0.66%
2012	514	+1.98%
2017	486	−1.11%
2023	513	+0.91%
Source: INSEE

== See also ==
- Communes of the Côtes-d'Armor department
