= La Chapelle-Blanche, Côtes-d'Armor =

La Chapelle-Blanche Ar Chapel-Wenn
- Commune
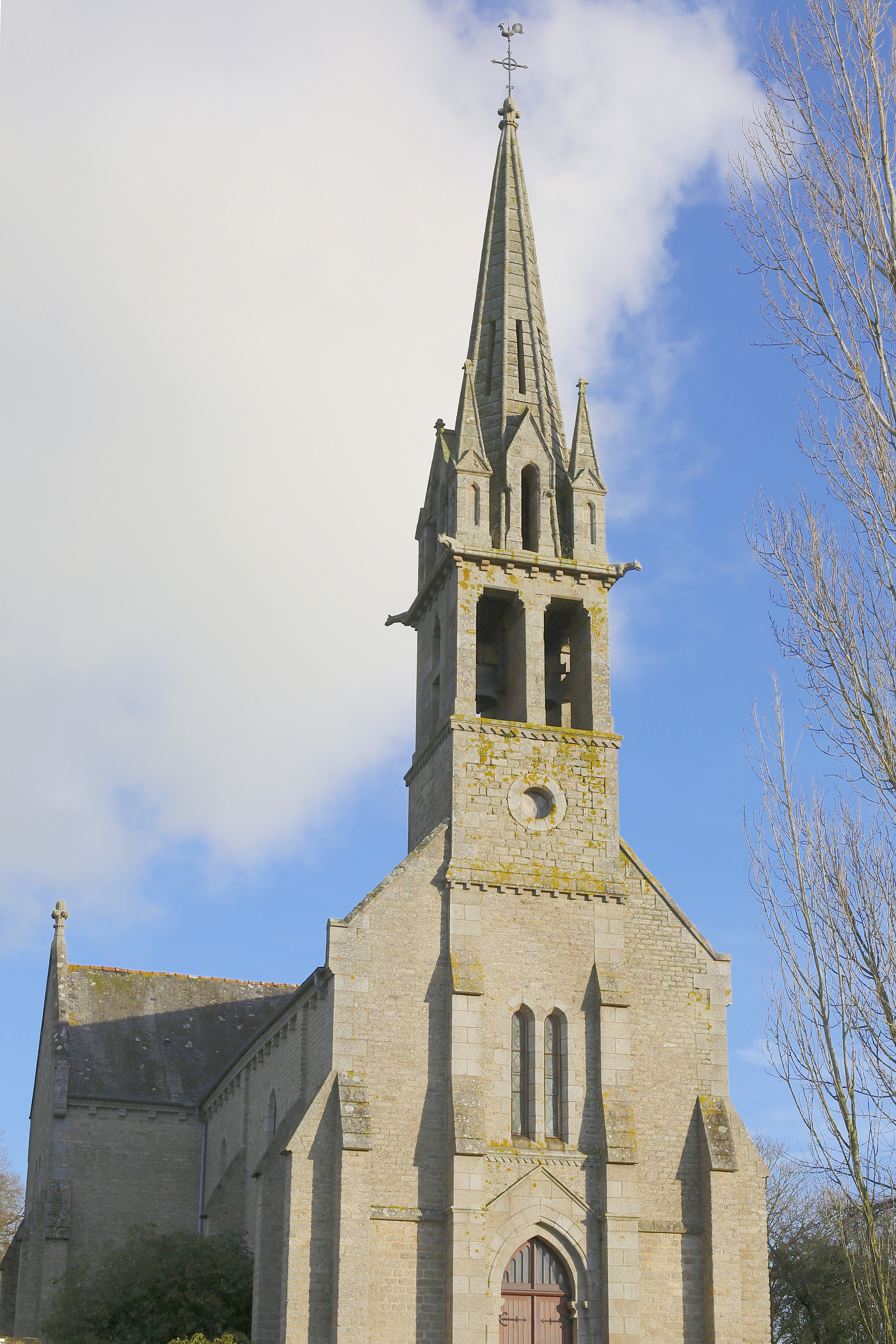
- The church of Notre-Dame-de-Pitié
- Location of La Chapelle-Blanche
- Location within France Location within Brittany
- Coordinates: 48°15′59″N 2°08′36″W
- Country: France
- Region: Brittany
- Department: Côtes-d'Armor
- Arrondissement: Dinan
- Canton: Broons
- Intercommunality: Dinan Agglomération

Government
  - Mayor (2020–2026): Sandrine Deutschmann
- Area^{1}: 7.92 km^{2} (3.06 sq mi)
- Highest elevation: 123 m (404 ft)
- Lowest elevation: 52 m (171 ft)
- Population (2023): 211
  - Density: 26.6/km^{2} (69.0/sq mi)
- Time zone: UTC+01:00 (CET)
  - Summer (DST): UTC+02:00 (CEST)
- INSEE/Postal code: 22036 /22350
- ^{1} French Land Register data, which excludes lakes, ponds, glaciers > 1 km^{2} (0.386 sq mi or 247 acres) and river estuaries.

La Chapelle-Blanche (French pronunciation: [la ʃapɛl blɑ̃ʃ], literally The White Chapel; Breton: Ar Chapel-Wenn; Gallo: La Chapèll-Blaunch) is a commune in the Côtes-d'Armor department of Brittany in northwestern France.

== Population ==
Historical population
Year	Pop.	±% p.a.
1968	236	—
1975	181	−3.72%
1982	180	−0.08%
1990	169	−0.79%
1999	165	−0.27%
2007	212	+3.18%
2012	189	−2.27%
2017	206	+1.74%
2023	211	+0.40%
Source: INSEE

Inhabitants of La Chapelle-Blanche are called Chapellois in French, as are those from many other places which have the word Chapelle in their names.

== See also ==
- Communes of the Côtes-d'Armor department
