= Saint-Vran =

Saint-Vran Sant-Vran
- Commune
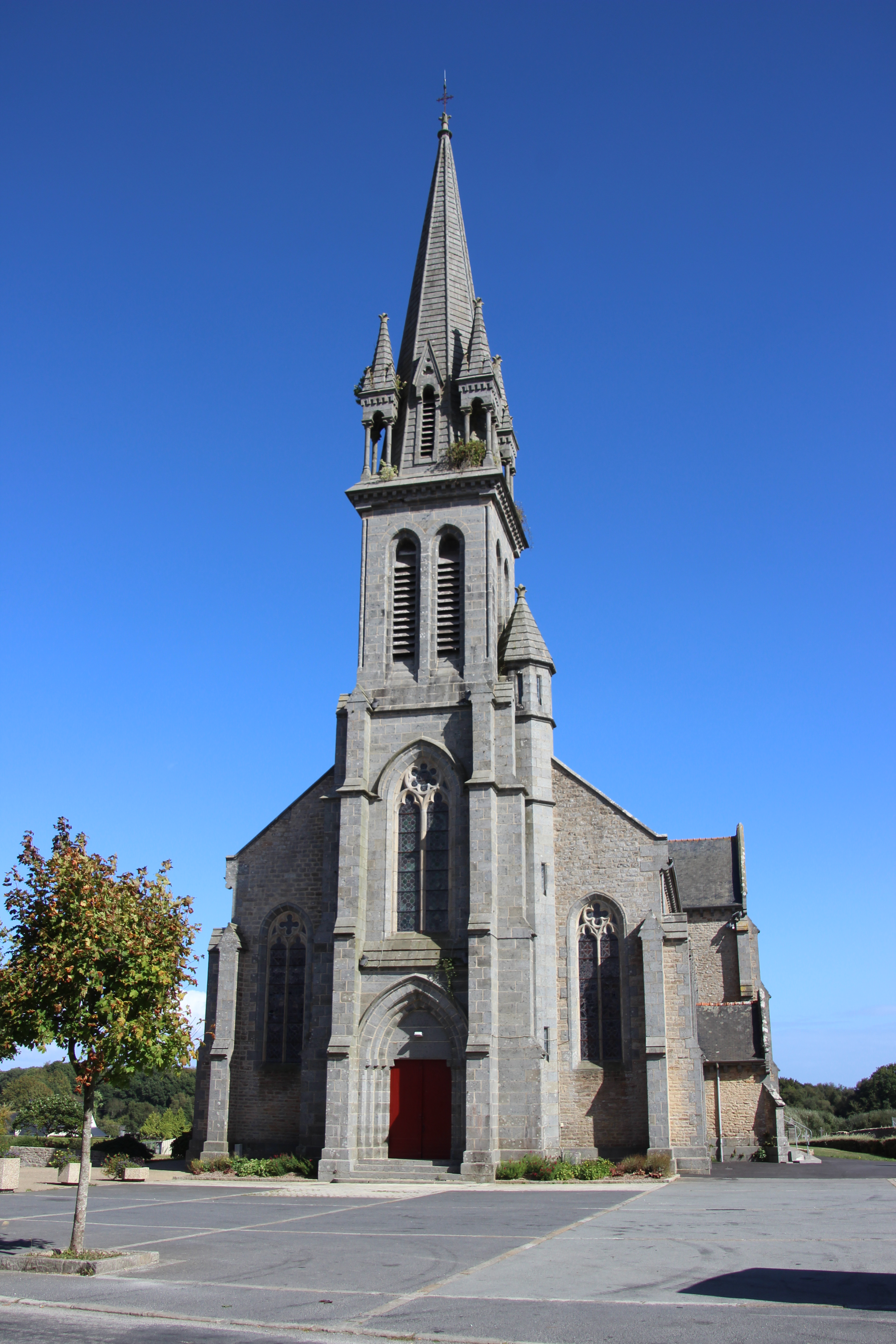
- The church of Saint-Vran
- Location of Saint-Vran
- Location within France Location within Brittany
- Coordinates: 48°14′18″N 2°26′28″W
- Country: France
- Region: Brittany
- Department: Côtes-d'Armor
- Arrondissement: Saint-Brieuc
- Canton: Broons

Government
  - Mayor (2020–2026): Évelyne Gaspaillard
- Area^{1}: 28.12 km^{2} (10.86 sq mi)
- Highest elevation: 302 m (991 ft)
- Lowest elevation: 127 m (417 ft)
- Population (2023): 781
  - Density: 27.8/km^{2} (71.9/sq mi)
- Time zone: UTC+01:00 (CET)
  - Summer (DST): UTC+02:00 (CEST)
- INSEE/Postal code: 22333 /22230
- ^{1} French Land Register data, which excludes lakes, ponds, glaciers > 1 km^{2} (0.386 sq mi or 247 acres) and river estuaries.

Saint-Vran (French pronunciation: [sɛ̃ vʁɑ̃]; Breton: Sant-Vran; Gallo: Saent-Veran) is a commune in the Côtes-d'Armor department of Brittany in northwestern France.

== Geography ==
The Meu river has its source in the commune.

== Population ==
Historical population
Year	Pop.	±% p.a.
1968	876	—
1975	819	−0.96%
1982	765	−0.97%
1990	672	−1.61%
1999	688	+0.26%
2007	707	+0.34%
2012	764	+1.56%
2017	759	−0.13%
2023	781	+0.48%
Source: INSEE

Inhabitants of Saint-Vran are called brennoviens in French.

== See also ==
- Communes of the Côtes-d'Armor department
