= Laurenan =

Laurenan Lanreunan
- Commune
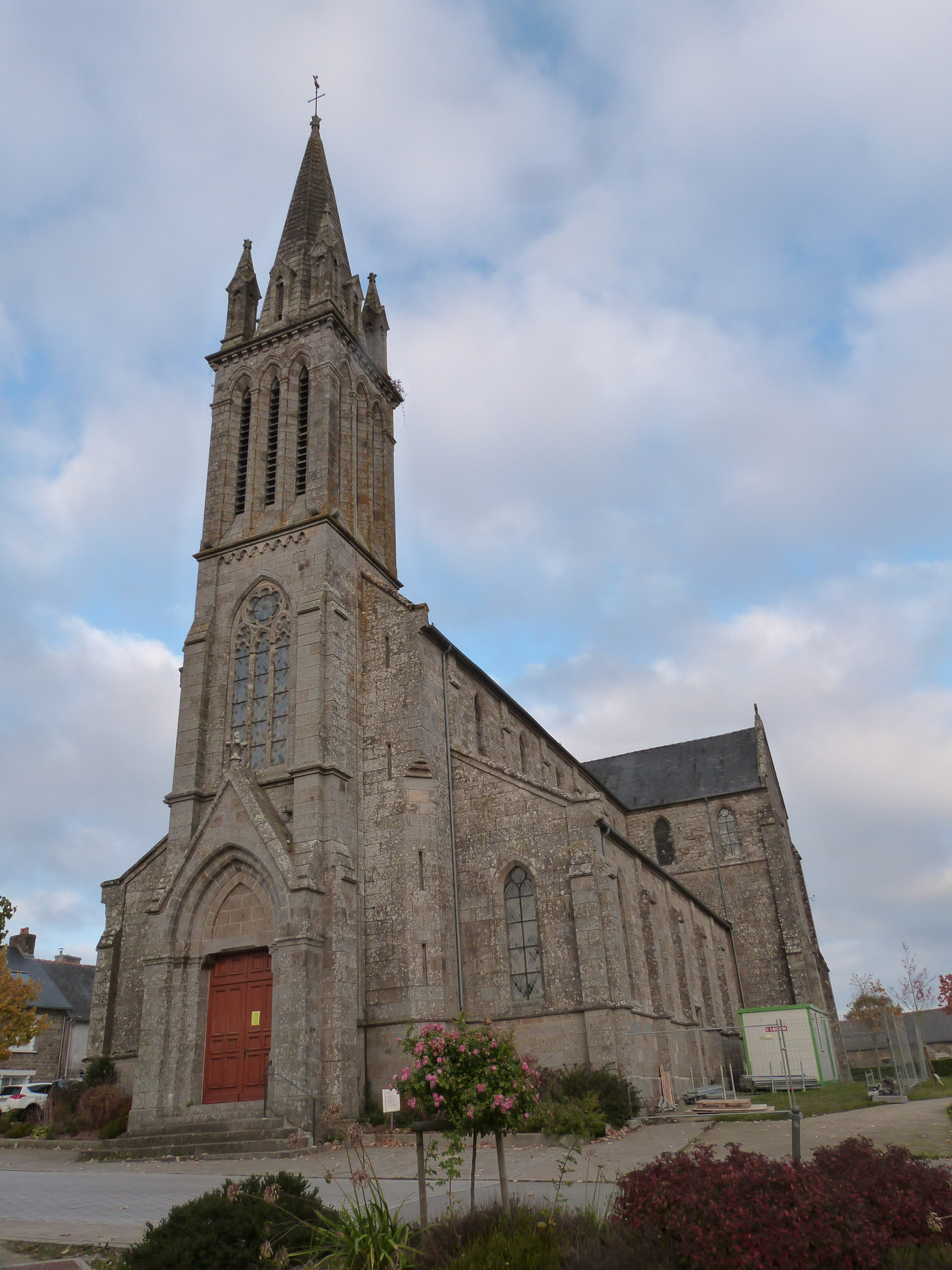
- The church of Saint-Ronan, in Laurenan

- Coat of arms
- Location of Laurenan
- Location within France Location within Brittany
- Coordinates: 48°12′00″N 2°32′03″W
- Country: France
- Region: Brittany
- Department: Côtes-d'Armor
- Arrondissement: Saint-Brieuc
- Canton: Broons
- Intercommunality: Loudéac Communauté - Bretagne Centre

Government
  - Mayor (2023–2026): Olivier Rivallan
- Area^{1}: 30.90 km^{2} (11.93 sq mi)
- Highest elevation: 295 m (968 ft)
- Lowest elevation: 120 m (390 ft)
- Population (2023): 744
  - Density: 24.1/km^{2} (62.4/sq mi)
- Time zone: UTC+01:00 (CET)
  - Summer (DST): UTC+02:00 (CEST)
- INSEE/Postal code: 22122 /22230
- ^{1} French Land Register data, which excludes lakes, ponds, glaciers > 1 km^{2} (0.386 sq mi or 247 acres) and river estuaries.

Laurenan (French pronunciation: [loʁnɑ̃]; Breton: Lanreunan) is a commune in the Côtes-d'Armor department of Brittany in northwestern France.

== Population ==
Historical population
| Year | Pop. | ±% p.a. |
|---|---|---|
| 1968 | 976 | — |
| 1975 | 869 | −1.65% |
| 1982 | 822 | −0.79% |
| 1990 | 791 | −0.48% |
| 1999 | 733 | −0.84% |
| 2007 | 716 | −0.29% |
| 2012 | 725 | +0.25% |
| 2017 | 736 | +0.30% |
| 2023 | 744 | +0.18% |
Source: INSEE

Inhabitants of Laurenan are called laurenanais in French.

== See also ==
- Communes of the Côtes-d'Armor department
