= Canton of Broons =

Coordinates: 48.32°N 2.26°W

The canton of Broons is an administrative division of the Côtes-d'Armor department, northwestern France. Its borders were modified at the French canton reorganisation which came into effect in March 2015. Its seat is in Broons.

It consists of the following communes:

1. Broons
2. Caulnes
3. La Chapelle-Blanche
4. Éréac
5. Gomené
6. Guenroc
7. Guitté
8. Illifaut
9. Lanrelas
10. Laurenan
11. Loscouët-sur-Meu
12. Mégrit
13. Merdrignac
14. Mérillac
15. Plumaudan
16. Plumaugat
17. Rouillac
18. Saint-Jouan-de-l'Isle
19. Saint-Launeuc
20. Saint-Maden
21. Saint-Vran
22. Sévignac
23. Trédias
24. Trémeur
25. Trémorel
26. Yvignac-la-Tour
