= Mérillac =

Mérillac Merelieg
- Commune
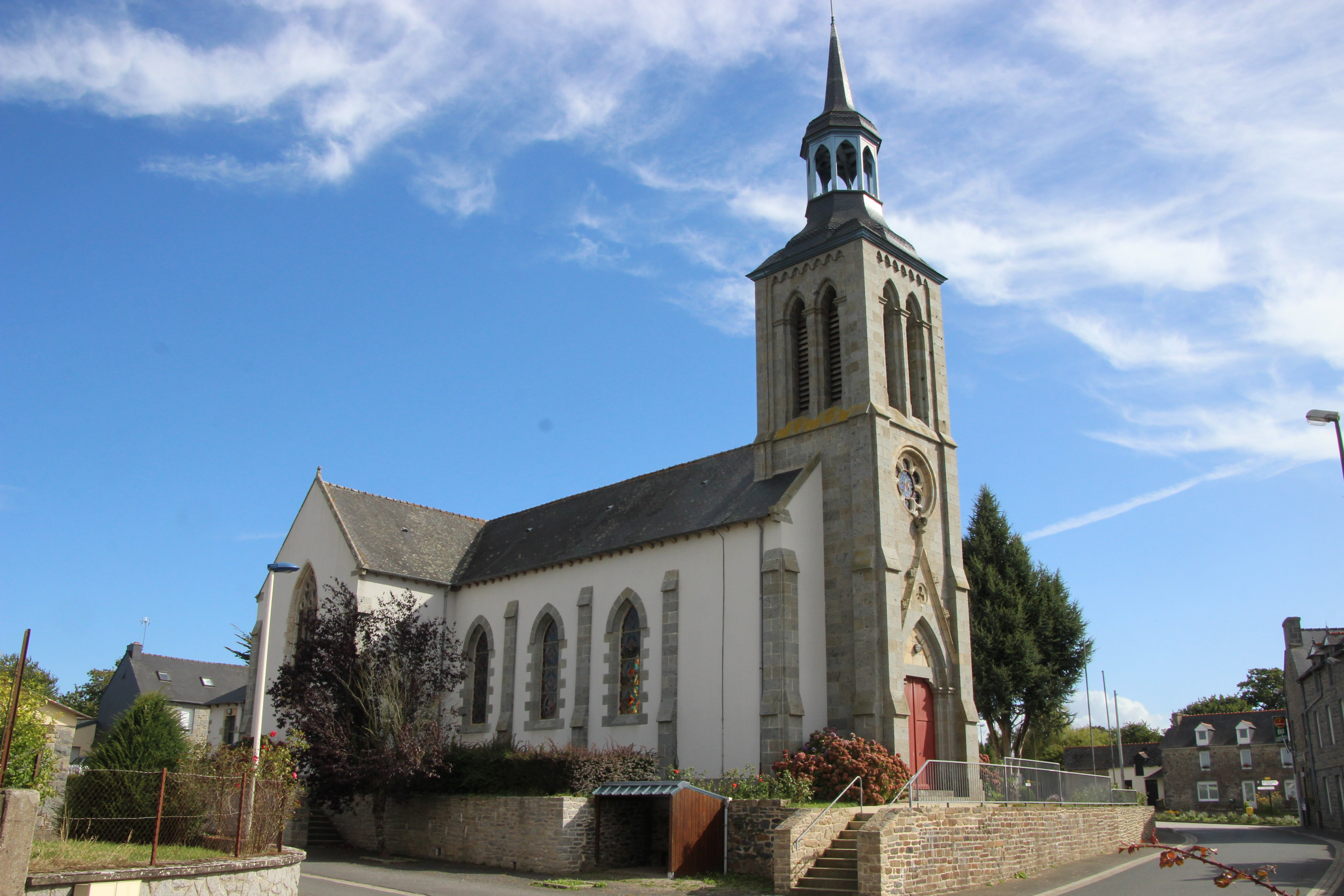
- The church of Saint-Pierre, in Mérillac
- Location of Mérillac
- Location within France Location within Brittany
- Coordinates: 48°15′24″N 2°23′35″W
- Country: France
- Region: Brittany
- Department: Côtes-d'Armor
- Arrondissement: Saint-Brieuc
- Canton: Broons

Government
  - Mayor (2020–2026): Claude Delahaye
- Area^{1}: 13.86 km^{2} (5.35 sq mi)
- Highest elevation: 188 m (617 ft)
- Lowest elevation: 108 m (354 ft)
- Population (2023): 249
  - Density: 18.0/km^{2} (46.5/sq mi)
- Time zone: UTC+01:00 (CET)
  - Summer (DST): UTC+02:00 (CEST)
- INSEE/Postal code: 22148 /22230
- ^{1} French Land Register data, which excludes lakes, ponds, glaciers > 1 km^{2} (0.386 sq mi or 247 acres) and river estuaries.

Mérillac (French pronunciation: [meʁijak]; Breton: Merelieg) is a commune in the Côtes-d'Armor department of Brittany in northwestern France.

== Geography ==
The Meu forms part of the commune's southern border.

The Rance forms part of the commune's western border, flows east-southeast through the middle of the commune, then forms most of its southeastern border.

== Population ==
Historical population
Year	Pop.	±% p.a.
1968	385	—
1975	341	−1.72%
1982	337	−0.17%
1990	267	−2.87%
1999	241	−1.13%
2007	234	−0.37%
2012	239	+0.42%
2017	233	−0.51%
2023	249	+1.11%
Source: INSEE

Inhabitants of Mérillac are called mérillaciens in French.

== See also ==
- Communes of the Côtes-d'Armor department
