= Rousselot =

Rousselot (English: /ruːsəˈloʊ/, French: [ʁuslo]) is a French surname. Notable people with the surname include:

- Jacques Rousselot (born 1949), French businessman
- Jean-Pierre Rousselot (1846–1924), French theologian
- John H. Rousselot (1927–2003), American journalist
- Juan Carlos Rousselot (1935–2010), Argentine radio and television personality
- Philippe Rousselot (born 1945), French cinematographer
- Pierre Rousselot (1878–1915), French Jesuit
