= Caulnes =

Caulnes Kaon
- Commune
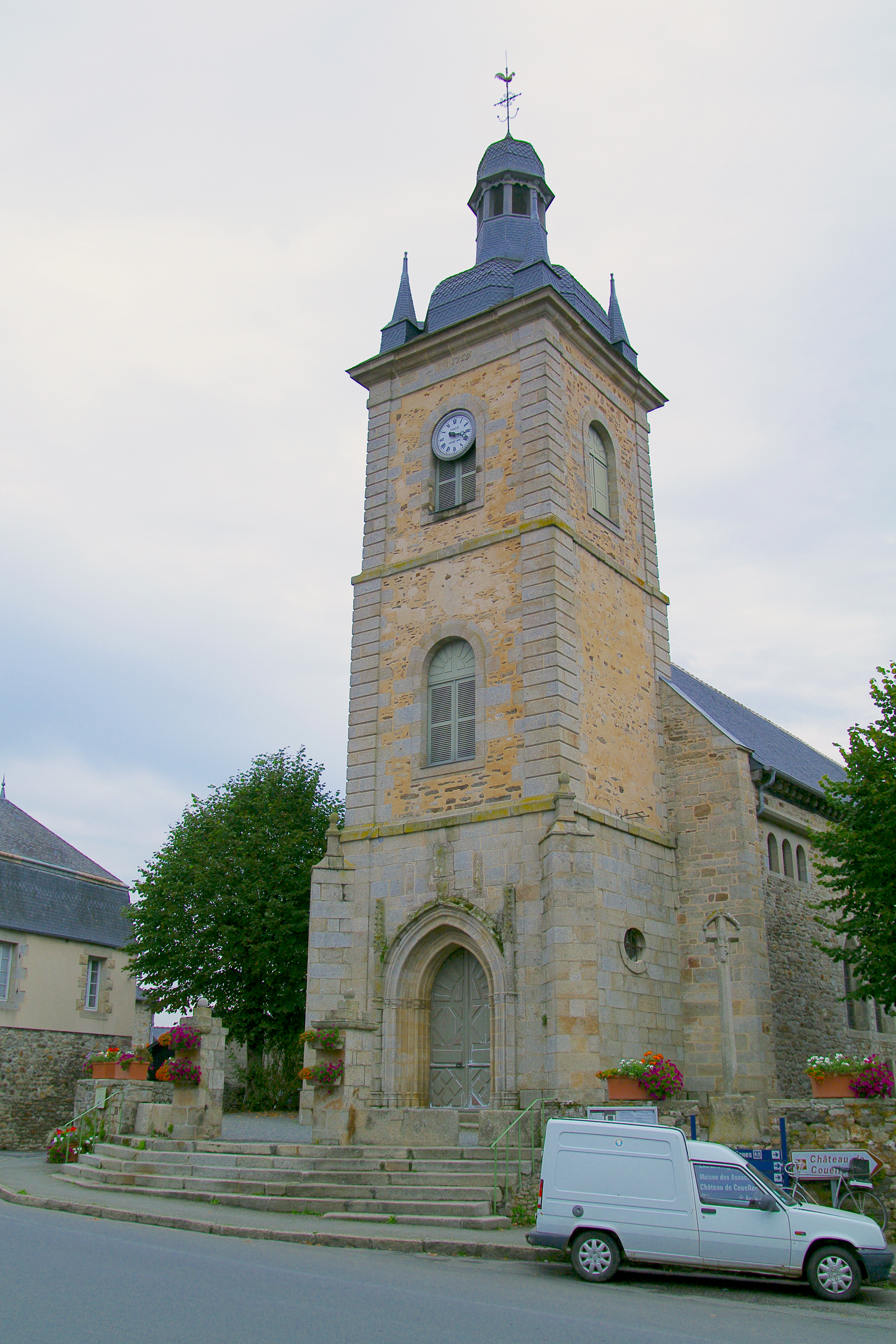
- The church of Caulnes

- Coat of arms
- Location of Caulnes
- Location within France Location within Brittany
- Coordinates: 48°17′23″N 2°09′13″W
- Country: France
- Region: Brittany
- Department: Côtes-d'Armor
- Arrondissement: Dinan
- Canton: Broons
- Intercommunality: Dinan Agglomération

Government
  - Mayor (2020–2026): Marina Le Moal
- Area^{1}: 31.36 km^{2} (12.11 sq mi)
- Highest elevation: 133 m (436 ft)
- Lowest elevation: 46 m (151 ft)
- Population (2023): 2,501
  - Density: 79.75/km^{2} (206.6/sq mi)
- Time zone: UTC+01:00 (CET)
  - Summer (DST): UTC+02:00 (CEST)
- INSEE/Postal code: 22032 /22350
- ^{1} French Land Register data, which excludes lakes, ponds, glaciers > 1 km^{2} (0.386 sq mi or 247 acres) and river estuaries.

Caulnes (French pronunciation: [kon]; Breton: Kaon; Gallo: Caunn) is a commune in the Côtes-d'Armor department of Brittany in northwestern France.

== Geography ==
=== Climate ===
Caulnes has an oceanic climate (Köppen climate classification Cfb). The average annual temperature in Caulnes is 12.1 °C (53.8 °F). The average annual rainfall is 848.4 mm (33.40 in) with November as the wettest month. The temperatures are highest on average in August, at around 18.7 °C (65.7 °F), and lowest in January, at around 5.9 °C (42.6 °F). The highest temperature ever recorded in Caulnes was 39.6 °C (103.3 °F) on 5 August 2003; the coldest temperature ever recorded was −13.0 °C (8.6 °F) on 2 January 1997.

Climate data for Caulnes (1981–2010 averages, extremes 1997−present)
Month	Jan	Feb	Mar	Apr	May	Jun	Jul	Aug	Sep	Oct	Nov	Dec	Year
Record high °C (°F)	16.7 (62.1)	20.1 (68.2)	23.4 (74.1)	27.5 (81.5)	30.1 (86.2)	35.9 (96.6)	38.1 (100.6)	39.6 (103.3)	32.3 (90.1)	30.8 (87.4)	19.9 (67.8)	16.4 (61.5)	39.6 (103.3)
Mean daily maximum °C (°F)	8.8 (47.8)	10.3 (50.5)	12.9 (55.2)	15.6 (60.1)	19.1 (66.4)	22.3 (72.1)	23.9 (75.0)	24.0 (75.2)	21.7 (71.1)	17.0 (62.6)	12.4 (54.3)	9.0 (48.2)	16.4 (61.5)
Daily mean °C (°F)	5.9 (42.6)	6.8 (44.2)	8.7 (47.7)	10.6 (51.1)	14.0 (57.2)	16.9 (62.4)	18.5 (65.3)	18.7 (65.7)	16.3 (61.3)	13.0 (55.4)	9.1 (48.4)	6.1 (43.0)	12.1 (53.8)
Mean daily minimum °C (°F)	2.9 (37.2)	3.4 (38.1)	4.4 (39.9)	5.6 (42.1)	9.0 (48.2)	11.5 (52.7)	13.1 (55.6)	13.3 (55.9)	10.8 (51.4)	9.0 (48.2)	5.8 (42.4)	3.1 (37.6)	7.7 (45.9)
Record low °C (°F)	−13.0 (8.6)	−8.7 (16.3)	−7.9 (17.8)	−3.6 (25.5)	−0.9 (30.4)	3.5 (38.3)	5.5 (41.9)	5.0 (41.0)	1.7 (35.1)	−5.1 (22.8)	−6.9 (19.6)	−7.4 (18.7)	−13.0 (8.6)
Average precipitation mm (inches)	79.0 (3.11)	62.8 (2.47)	60.0 (2.36)	64.3 (2.53)	71.9 (2.83)	48.2 (1.90)	59.3 (2.33)	58.0 (2.28)	58.9 (2.32)	93.1 (3.67)	98.6 (3.88)	94.3 (3.71)	848.4 (33.40)
Average precipitation days (≥ 1.0 mm)	13.5	11.6	10.9	11.2	10.6	7.9	9.0	8.7	8.1	13.7	15.4	15.3	135.9
Source: Meteociel

== Population ==
Inhabitants of Caulnes are called Caulnais in French.

Historical population
Year	Pop.	±% p.a.
1968	1,828	—
1975	1,990	+1.22%
1982	1,942	−0.35%
1990	1,992	+0.32%
1999	2,016	+0.13%
2007	2,278	+1.54%
2012	2,439	+1.38%
2017	2,488	+0.40%
2023	2,501	+0.09%
Source: INSEE

== See also ==
- Communes of the Côtes-d'Armor department
