= Rouillac, Côtes-d'Armor =

Rouillac Rioleg
- Commune
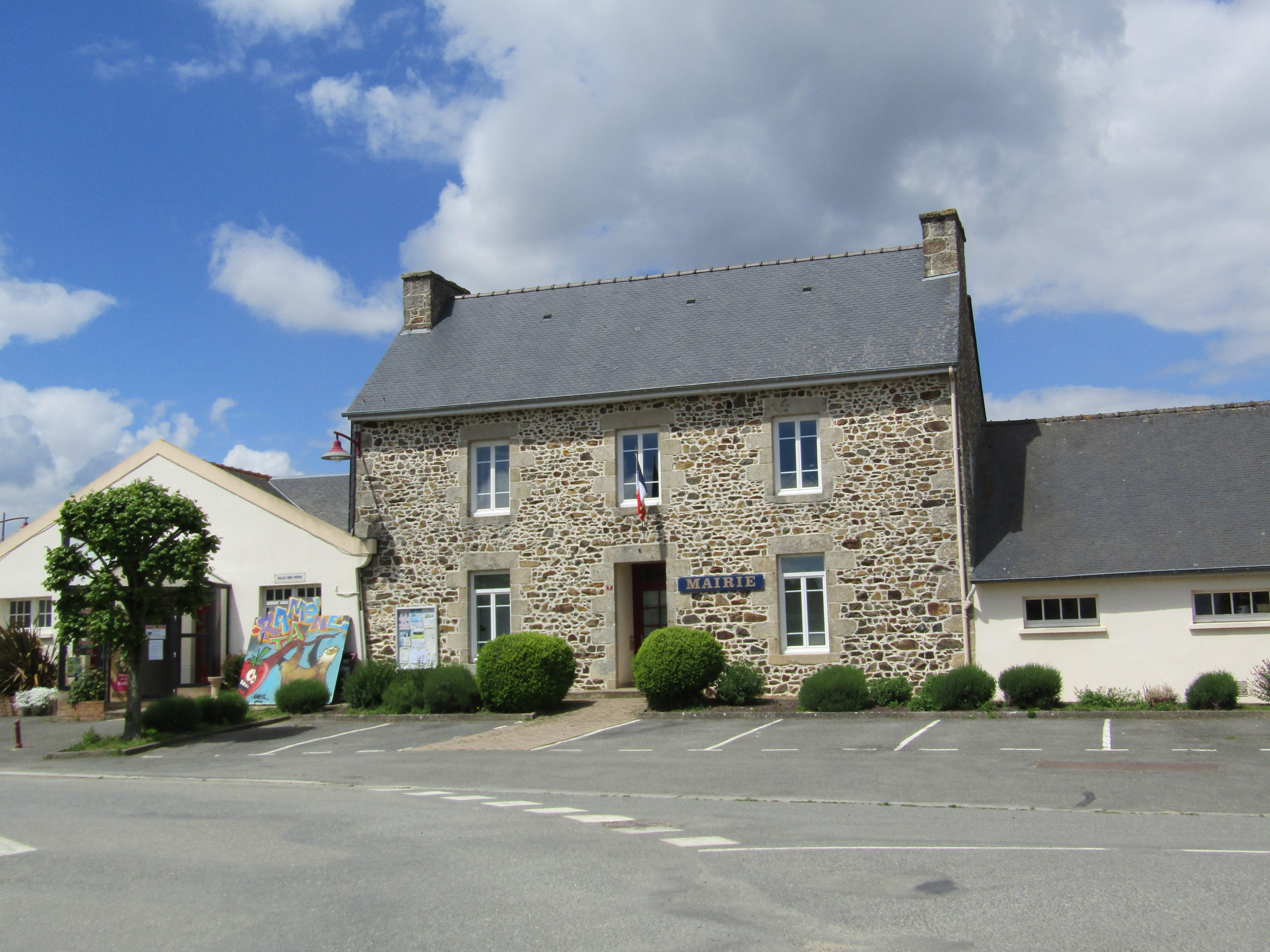
- Town hall

- Coat of arms
- Location of Rouillac
- Location within France Location within Brittany
- Coordinates: 48°18′36″N 2°21′53″W
- Country: France
- Region: Brittany
- Department: Côtes-d'Armor
- Arrondissement: Saint-Brieuc
- Canton: Broons
- Intercommunality: CA Lamballe Terre et Mer

Government
  - Mayor (2020–2026): Jean-Luc Couëllan
- Area^{1}: 15.77 km^{2} (6.09 sq mi)
- Highest elevation: 187 m (614 ft)
- Lowest elevation: 81 m (266 ft)
- Population (2023): 409
  - Density: 25.9/km^{2} (67.2/sq mi)
- Time zone: UTC+01:00 (CET)
  - Summer (DST): UTC+02:00 (CEST)
- INSEE/Postal code: 22267 /22250
- ^{1} French Land Register data, which excludes lakes, ponds, glaciers > 1 km^{2} (0.386 sq mi or 247 acres) and river estuaries.

Rouillac (French pronunciation: [ʁujak]; Breton: Rioleg) is a commune in the Côtes-d'Armor department of Brittany in northwestern France.

== Population ==
Historical population
Year	Pop.	±% p.a.
1968	579	—
1975	518	−1.58%
1982	479	−1.11%
1990	424	−1.51%
1999	366	−1.62%
2007	355	−0.38%
2012	380	+1.37%
2017	395	+0.78%
2023	409	+0.58%
Source: INSEE

Inhabitants of Rouillac are called rouillacais in French.

== See also ==
- Communes of the Côtes-d'Armor department
