= Yvan Keller =

French serial killer (1960–2006)

- Born: 13 December 1960; Wittenheim, Haut-Rhin, France
- Died: 22 September 2006 (aged 45); Mulhouse, France
- Cause of death: Suicide by hanging
- Other name: "The Pillow Killer"

Details
- Victims: 23–150
- Span of crimes: 1989–2006
- Country: France (proven); Switzerland, Germany (confessed)
- State: Alsace
- Date apprehended: September 2006

Yvan Keller (13 December 1960 – 22 September 2006), nicknamed The Pillow Killer, was a French serial killer. Between 1989 and 2006, he killed at least 23 people in France, Switzerland, and Germany, and confessed to killing about 150. If corroborated, that would make him the most prolific French serial killer of the 20th century.

== Early life ==
Yvan Keller was born on 13 December 1960, in Wittenheim, Haut-Rhin. His parents were basket makers and sedentary travelers who had eight other children, all of whom lived on Rue du Bourg. His father, Joseph, was employed in the potash mines of Alsace. Keller grew up in a rather unstable family, as his father forced him to work hard so they could survive. His mother died at age 49.

This busy life landed Yvan behind bars at the age of 17 for stealing two antiques in Battenheim in 1981. Keller was arrested and sentenced to 10 years in prison for robbery.

=== The man with two faces ===
In August 1989, Keller was released. He moved to Mulhouse on Rue de Verdun, in the apartment of an old mansion in a quiet and green area, away from the city centre. He became a landscape gardener and created a small company: Alsa-Jardin. His clients were very satisfied with his work and frequently recommended him. He led a modest life, living with a woman named Marina, but they later separated, and he found a new companion named Séverine.

Keller's neighbours said that he was very helpful, friendly, and affectionate with animals.

Marina, Keller's first companion, said he had forced her into prostitution because he was in constant need of money due to his love for luxury, casinos, horse racing, great restaurants, and big-name hotels. One of his friends said that while he was in a relationship with his second wife, Séverine, she was already in a relationship with another man. When he learned of this, Keller went to see the man, who was a childhood friend of his, and put a gun to his mouth, threatening him to leave his wife alone.

== Murders and subsequent investigation ==
On 21 January 1994, at 10 Rue Basse in Burnhaupt-le-Haut, 79-year-old Marie Winterholer was found dead in her bed, lying on her back. The doctor concluded that it was a natural death and issued a burial permit.

On 12 March 1994, at 11 Rue Basse, Germain Mang visited his 86-year-old mother, Ernestine Mang. Just behind the door, he was surprised to find an old butter churn, which had been stored in the house's cellar for years. He then found his mother dead in bed, lying on her back. He was surprised that the bedding was flawlessly drawn because Ernestine had trouble moving due to hip problems. Because of this, Germain was convinced that it wasn't her who had moved the churn.

On 27 April 1994, at 22 Rue Basse, 77-year-old Augusta Wassmer was also found dead in her bed, lying on her back. No break-in was observed, but her daughter Marie-Françoise Roecklin found that the bed was too well done. The autopsy concluded with a death by cardiac arrest, probably "due to great fear". Later, Marie-Françoise noticed that Augusta's bank card and a key to the house had disappeared and that the card had been used in Mulhouse to make three withdrawals.

After his arrest, Keller claimed to be responsible for the murders of 150 people; Keller was implicated in 23 murders of old ladies, but is suspected of having killed 40.

As a landscape gardener, Keller could easily locate the houses of his victims. He killed old people so he could steal their valuables, such as money, paintings, and jewels, which he would later sell to junk dealers. He would repeat the same scenario each time: he suffocated his victims in their bed, then remade the bed so it would look like a natural death.

== Arrest ==
Between 1993 and 2003, Yvan Keller was denounced 3 times, but the first two did not follow through. The third, after a three-year investigation, led to his arrest. Keller quickly confessed, advancing the number of victims to 150, admitting to having been active in Alsace, Switzerland, and Germany. He was only indicted for five deaths: three in Haut-Rhin in 1994 and two in Bas-Rhin. Eight murders, now investigated, could have completed the list, with investigators finding similarities in other cases as well.

== Death ==
On 22 September 2006, Yvan Keller hung himself at the Mulhouse High Court, intertwining his shoelaces to form a noose which he looped through a light fixture in his courthouse holding cell. His last words were "I just wanted to be loved".

== In other media ==
=== Press articles ===
- "Behind a suicide, the shadow of old ladies killed" Article published on 26 September 2006, in Libération.
- « Mulhouse. Il s'accusait d'une trentaine de crimes » Article published on 27 September 2006, in La Dépêche du Midi.
- « Sur les traces du tueur de vieilles dames » Article by Jean-Marc Ducos and Jean-François Frey published on 27 September 2006, in Le Parisien.
- « Les gendarmes ne nous ont pas pris au sérieux » Article published on 27 September 2006, in Le Parisien.
- « Mulhouse : Keller, tueur du siècle ? » Article published on 4 October 2006, in Le Nouvel observateur.
- « Yvan Keller aurait fait 23 » Article by Jean-Marc Ducos and François Vignolle published on 25 April 2007, in Le Parisien.
- « Mise en examen de deux complices du "tueur aux vieilles dames" » Article published on 3 October 2008, in Le Parisien.
- « La compagne d'un tueur en série indemnisée » Article published on 20 May 2009, in L'Express.
- « Keller se pend après s'être accusé de trente meurtres » Article by Yolande Baldeweck published on 25 January 2010, in Le Figaro.
- « L'homme qui s'accusait de 150 meurtres... » Article published on 5 February 2012, in L'Alsace.
- « Serial killer ? » Article published on 17 February 2012, in Dernières Nouvelles d'Alsace.
- « Tueur de vieilles dames : pas d’erreur du tribunal » Article published on 25 February 2012, in Le Républicain lorrain.
- (in Italian)« Il killer che dava la morte migliore » Article published on 3 August 2017, in Corriere della Sera.

=== TV documentaries ===
- "Yvan Keller: the Pillow Killer" on 5 and 15 October, 26 and 30 November, 12 and 17 December 2010 in Affaires criminelles on NT1, then on Toute l'Histoire.
- "The Keller case, the killer in the pillow" 22 December 2010, in Criminal Investigations: The Magazine of News Items on W9 rebroadcast in Dossiers criminels on Numéro 23.
- "The killer committed suicide" (first report) in Strasbourg on 10, 17, 25 and 29 June 2013, and 5, 12 and 20 May 2014 in Crimes on NRJ 12.

=== Radio broadcasts ===
- "The Yvan Keller case" on 17 February 2012, and "Yvan Keller, the killer in the pillow", 5 June 2013, in L'Heure du crime by Jacques Pradel on RTL.

== See also ==
- List of serial killers by country
- List of serial killers by number of victims
