= Maurice Picon =

French physicist and archaeologist (1931–2014)

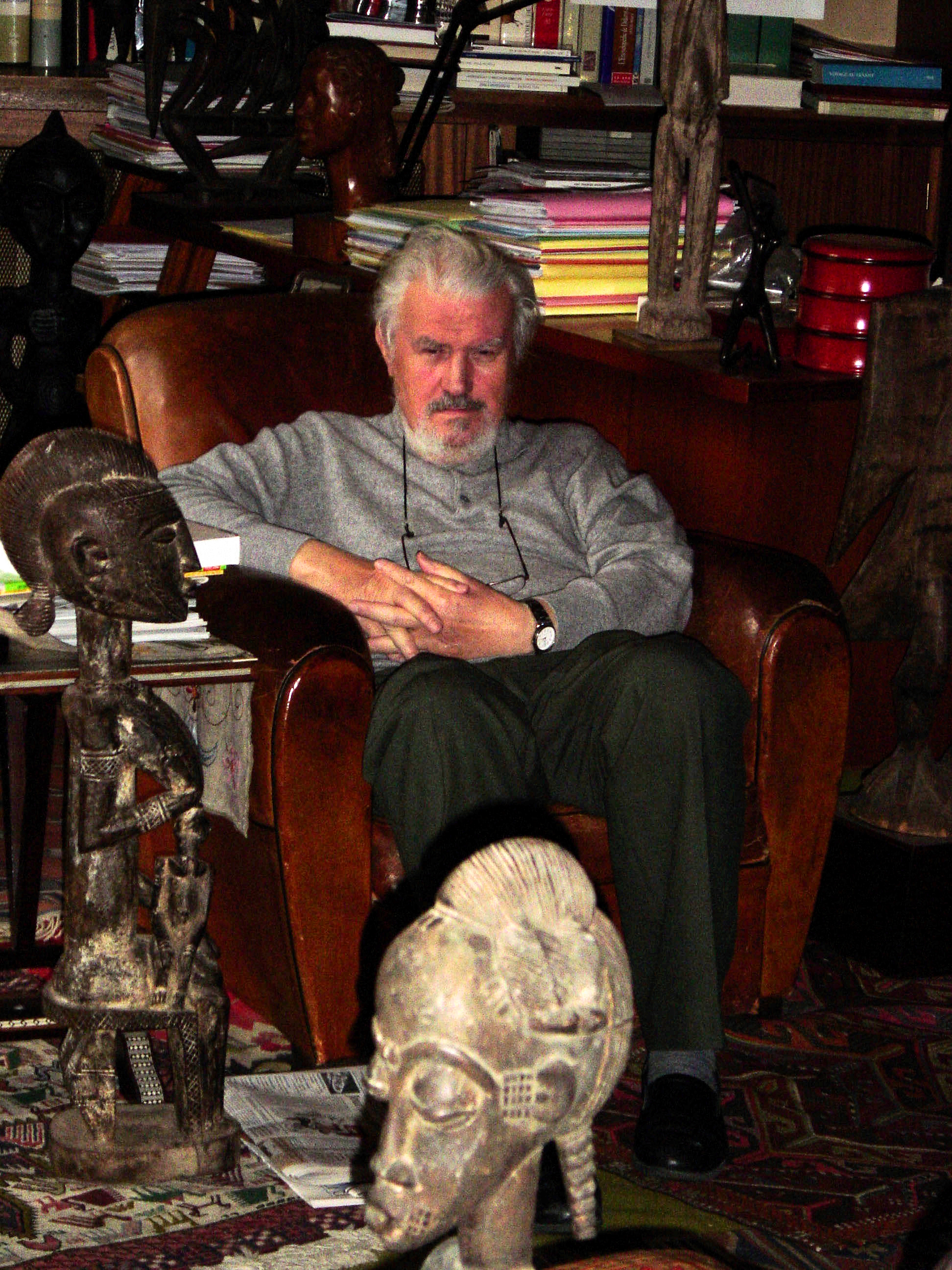
Maurice Picon

Maurice Picon (27 July 1931 – 16 November 2014) was a French physicist and archaeologist, and a pioneer of archaeometry in France.

== Biography ==
Maurice Picon was born on 27 July 1931 in Wittelsheim and died in Lyon on 16 November 2014. His funeral was held at 10am on 22 November 2014 in the Church of Saint-Martin, Oullins. His son, Antoine Picon, is professor of the History of Architecture at Harvard Graduate School of Design; his daughter, Anne-Françoise, is a teacher of mathematics in Paris.

== Work ==
In 1987, Picon was the founder of the Groupe des Méthodes Physico-Chimiques contribuant à l'Archéologie (GMPCA), an association for the promotion, development and recognition of archaeometry in France. It was open to all disciplines contributing to the field of archaeology and welcomed, most notably, natural scientists (geoarchaeologists, archaeozoologists, archaeobotanists etc.). It became the Groupe des Méthodes Pluridisciplinaires contribuant à l'archéologie.

In 2001, Maurice Picon established the ceramology laboratory of the Maison de l’Orient at Lyon. This is a recognise unit of the French CNRS (UMR 5138) and is now known as the ARAR (Archéologie et Archéométrie).

Maurice Picon's personal library and archives have been donated by his family to the Centre d’Etudes Alexandrines (CEAlex). During celebrations to mark the 25th anniversary of the CEAlex, on 24 May 2015, The Maurice Picon Library was inaugurated along with a permanent website with access to his published works.

== Bibliography ==
In honour of Maurice Picon, the CEAlex (USR 3134, CNRS) has constructed a database of works published by Maurice Picon using a list of publications he himself assembled up to the year 2000, and an inventory of subsequent publications. More than two thirds of the references can be downloaded through the CEAlex and other websites.
