= Le Républicain Lorrain =

French daily regional newspaper

- Type: Weekly newspaper
- Format: Tabloid
- Owner: EBRA Group (BFSM)
- Founded: 19 June 1919; 107 years ago
- Headquarters: Woippy
- City: Metz
- ISSN: 0397-0639 (print); 2262-4856 (web)
- OCLC number: 1058617436
- Website: www.republicain-lorrain.fr

Le Républicain Lorrain (French pronunciation: [lə ʁepyblikɛ̃ lɔʁɛ̃]; founded in 1919) is a daily regional French newspaper, based in Woippy suburb of Metz. As of 2012, its daily circulation was 123,357. In 2020, its circulation amounted to 87,508 copies.

It is owned by the French Bank Crédit Mutuel via Groupe EBRA, a fully owned media group active in Eastern France. It also owns the newspapers L'Alsace and Le Pays. The newspaper has its primary market in the région of Lorraine (Moselle and Pays Haut) circulated in seven local editions, thanks to seven different newsrooms.

== See also ==
- List of newspapers in France
