= François Joly =

French politician (1872–1944)

Deputy for the 2nd constituency of Ille-et-Vilaine
- In office 3 May 1936 – 31 May 1942

Personal details
- Born: 9 October 1872 Plélan-le-Grand, France
- Died: 8 May 1944 (aged 71) Bruz, France
- Party: Independent and Social Action Republicans
- Occupation: Doctor

François Joly (9 October 1872 – 8 May 1944) was a French politician and doctor. A conservative candidate, he was elected in 1936 to represent the 2nd constituency of Ille-et-Vilaine in the National Assembly. He was killed in an airstrike during the Second World War in 1944.

== Life ==
Born in 1872 in Plélan-le-Grand, Joly settled in the town of Bruz as a doctor prior to the First World War. Mobilized to serve during the conflict, he returned home in 1918 and was elected mayor the following year. During his tenure, he focused on electrification, causing Bruz to become one of the first municipalities in the area to become electrified. In 1936, Joly ran in the elections for the position of Deputy representing the 2nd constituency of Ille-et-Vilaine, having unsuccessfully run four years earlier in the 1932 legislative election. He won the 1936 election with 58% of the vote. He was one of fifteen Breton politicians elected in 1936 to sign the, which aimed to create a parliamentary group composing of Bretons and to advance Breton interests in the National Assembly.

Affiliated with the Independent and Social Action Republicans, Joly campaigned against Prime Minister of France Léon Blum. He was a member of several government committees during his tenure. He stated he was in favor of electoral reform ensuring proportional representation. On 10 July 1940, Joly voted in favour of granting the cabinet presided by Marshal Philippe Pétain authority to draw up a new constitution, thereby effectively ending the French Third Republic and establishing Vichy France. Having served as mayor of Bruz for twenty-five years, including during the German occupation of France, Joly and most of his family were killed in the Allied bombardment of Bruz on 8 May 1944.
