= Materiel =

Military arms and supplies

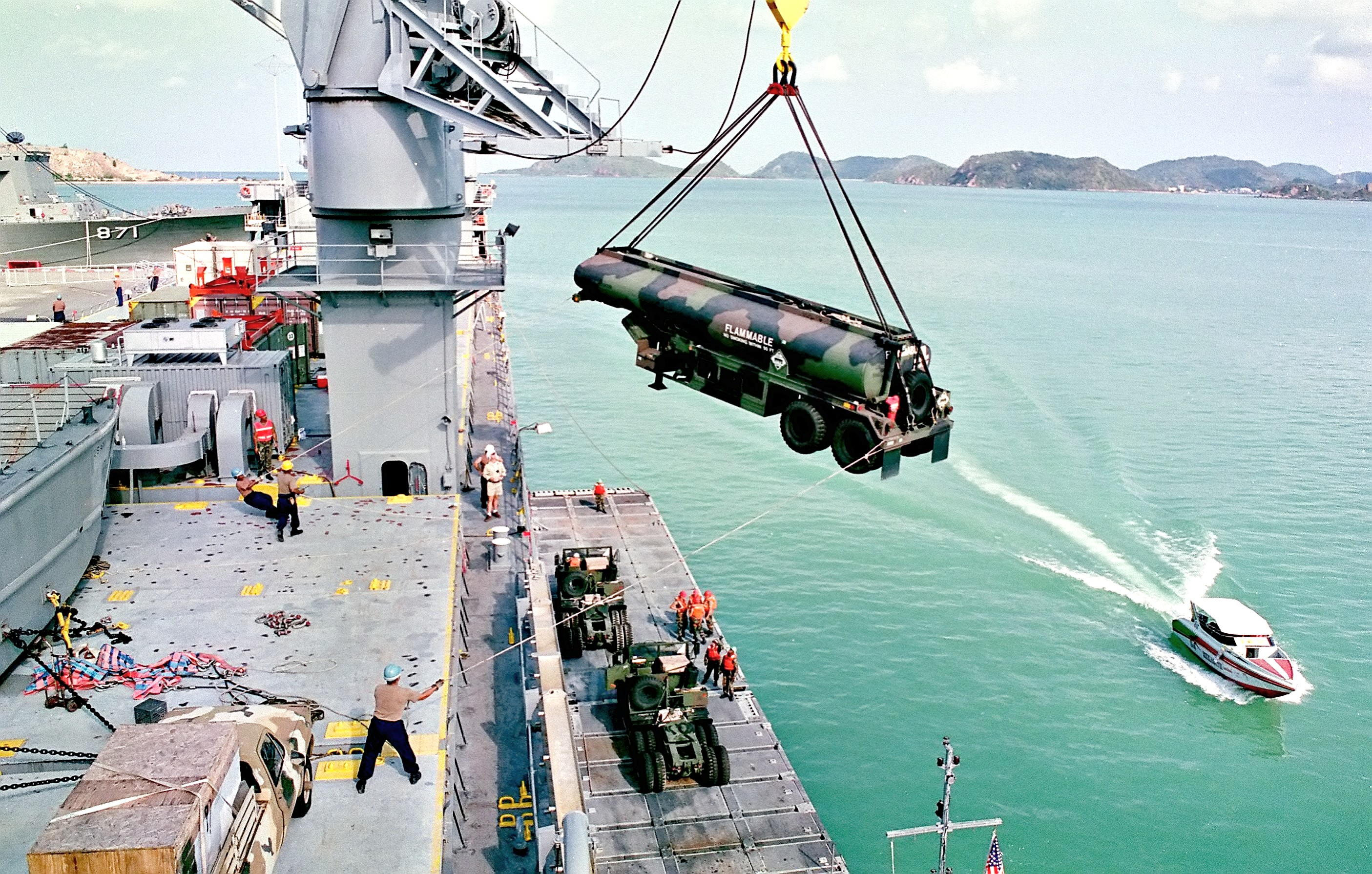
Materiel movements in exercise Cobra Gold in 1998

Materiel or matériel (/məˌtɪəriˈɛl/; from French matériel 'equipment, hardware') is supplies, equipment, and weapons in military supply-chain management, and typically supplies and equipment in a commercial supply chain context. (Note: matériel: "equipment, apparatus, and supplies used by an organization or institution"— Merriam-Webster's Dictionary)

== Military ==
In a military context, the term materiel refers either to the specific needs (excluding manpower) of a force to complete a specific mission, or the general sense of the needs (excluding manpower) of a functioning army.

An important category of materiel is commonly referred to as ordnance, especially concerning mounted guns (artillery) and the shells they consume. Along with fuel, and munitions in general, the steady supply of ordnance is an ongoing logistical challenge in active combat zones.

Materiel management consists of continuing actions relating to planning, organizing, directing, coordinating, controlling, and evaluating the application of resources to ensure the effective and economical support of military forces. It includes provisioning, cataloging, requirements determination, acquisition, distribution, maintenance, and disposal. The terms "materiel management", "materiel control", "inventory control", "inventory management", and "supply management" are synonymous.

Materiel is often shipped to and used in severe climates without controlled warehouses or fixed material-handling equipment. Packaging and labeling often need to meet stringent technical specifications to help ensure proper delivery and final use. Some military procurement allows for commercial packaging rather than the more stringent military grades.

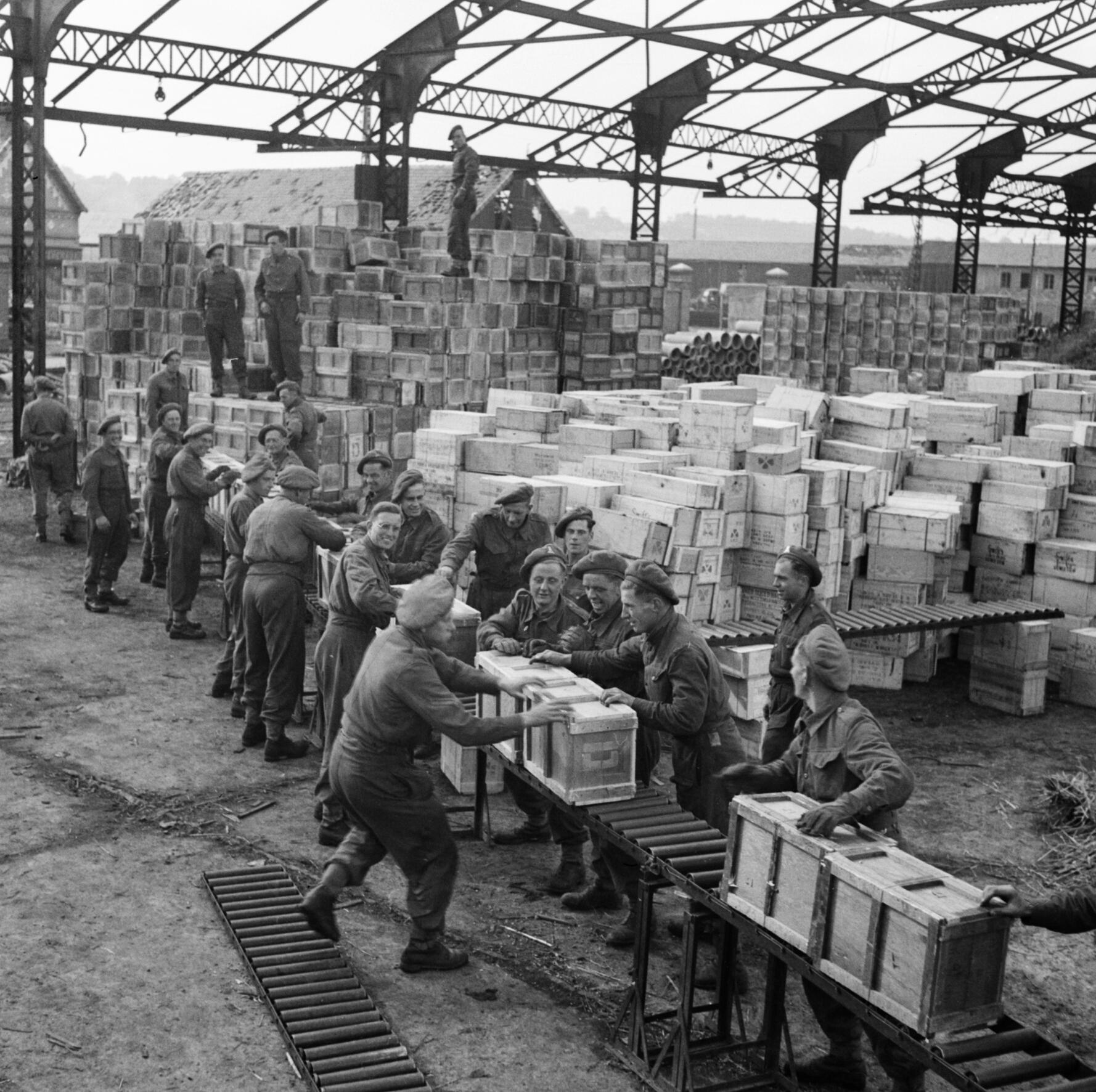
Sorting supplies in Dieppe, 1944

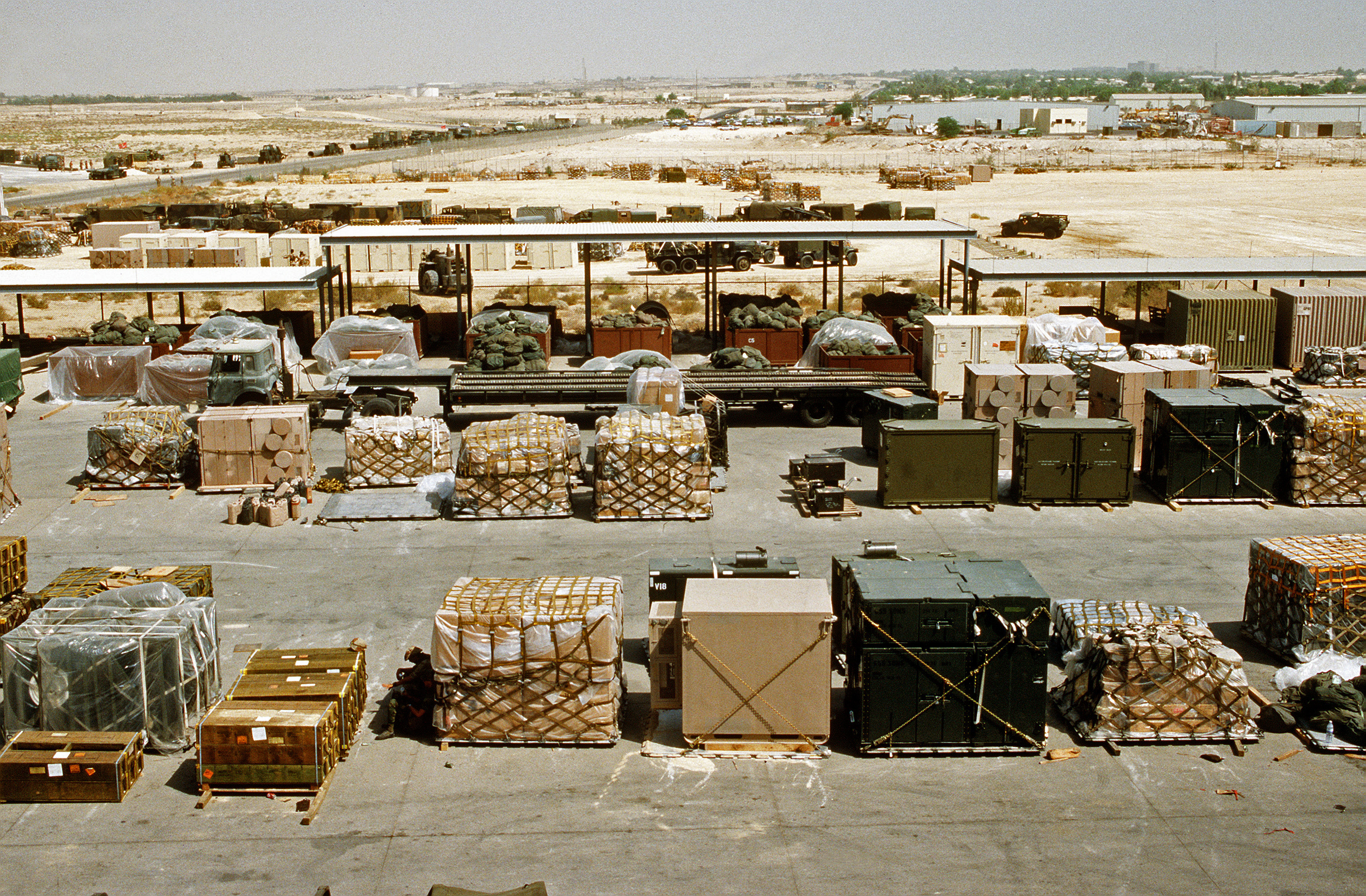
Pallets and containers of equipment sit in a logistics support area during Operation Desert Shield, 1991

== Commercial ==
Materiel in the commercial distribution context refers to the products of the business, as distinct from those involved in operating the business itself.

== See also ==
- Anti-materiel rifle
- Inventory
- Matériel (French Army)
- Military acquisition
- Military logistics
- Military supply chain management
- Supply chain
- United States Army Materiel Command
- Air Force Materiel Command
- United States Army Medical Research and Materiel Command
