= Bruz =

- Commune
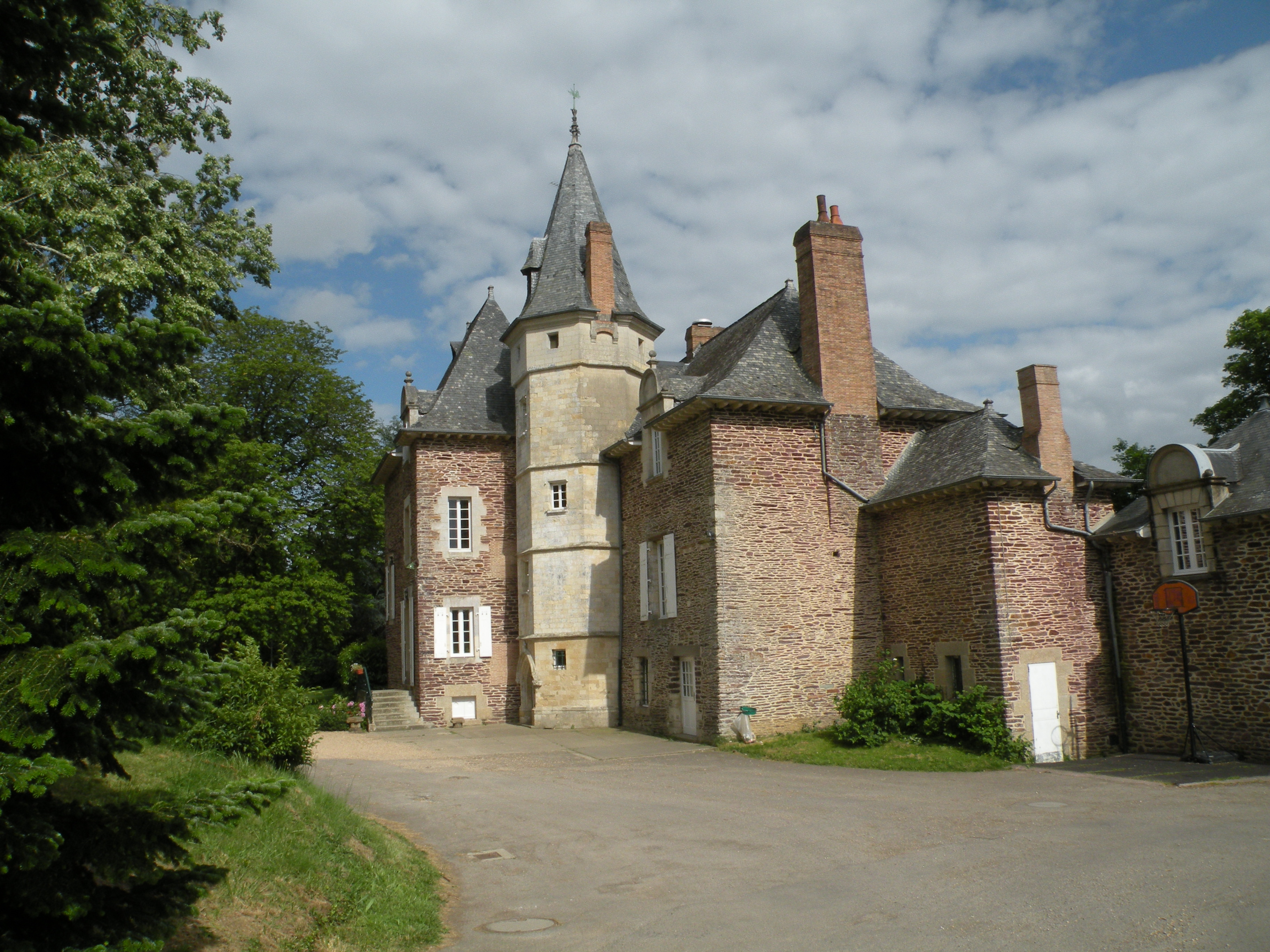
- Castle of Carcé

- Coat of arms
- Location of Bruz
- Location within France Location within Brittany
- Coordinates: 48°01′32″N 1°44′41″W
- Country: France
- Region: Brittany
- Department: Ille-et-Vilaine
- Arrondissement: Rennes
- Canton: Bruz
- Intercommunality: Rennes Métropole

Government
  - Mayor (2020–2026): Philippe Salmon
- Area^{1}: 29.95 km^{2} (11.56 sq mi)
- Highest elevation: 99 m (325 ft)
- Lowest elevation: 12 m (39 ft)
- Population (2023): 19,683
  - Density: 657.2/km^{2} (1,702/sq mi)
- Time zone: UTC+01:00 (CET)
  - Summer (DST): UTC+02:00 (CEST)
- INSEE/Postal code: 35047 /35170
- ^{1} French Land Register data, which excludes lakes, ponds, glaciers > 1 km^{2} (0.386 sq mi or 247 acres) and river estuaries.

Bruz (French pronunciation: [bʁy], or non-standard: [bʁyz]) is a commune in the Ille-et-Vilaine department in Brittany in northwestern France.

== Geography ==
Bruz is located near the center of the Ille-et-Vilaine department, 14 km from Rennes. It is near the confluence of the rivers Vilaine and Seiche.

== Population ==
Inhabitants of Bruz are called Bruzois in French.

Historical population

Year	Pop.	±% p.a.
1793	2,307	—
1800	2,173	−0.85%
1806	2,048	−0.98%
1821	2,198	+0.47%
1831	2,280	+0.37%
1836	2,233	−0.42%
1841	2,409	+1.53%
1846	2,460	+0.42%
1851	2,458	−0.02%
1856	2,530	+0.58%
1861	2,677	+1.14%
1866	3,006	+2.35%
1872	2,836	−0.97%
1876	2,828	−0.07%
1881	3,003	+1.21%
1886	3,126	+0.81%
1891	3,432	+1.89%
1896	3,503	+0.41%
1901	3,455	−0.28%

Year	Pop.	±% p.a.
1906	2,864	−3.68%
1911	2,809	−0.39%
1921	2,751	−0.21%
1926	2,664	−0.64%
1931	2,900	+1.71%
1936	2,799	−0.71%
1946	2,820	+0.07%
1954	3,814	+3.85%
1962	4,213	+1.25%
1968	5,969	+5.98%
1975	7,281	+2.88%
1982	7,856	+1.09%
1990	8,114	+0.40%
1999	13,207	+5.56%
2007	15,031	+1.63%
2012	16,670	+2.09%
2017	18,266	+1.85%
2023	19,683	+1.25%

Source: EHESS and INSEE (1968-2023)

== Mayors ==
The current mayor is Philippe Salmon, elected in 2020. Previous mayors are:

- Auguste Louapre (Miscellaneous Right), from 2014 to 2020;
- Philippe Caffin (Miscellaneous Left), from 2008 to 2014;
- Robert Barré (Union for French Democracy), from 1989 to 2008;
- Alphonse Legault (Miscellaneous Right), from 1960 to 1989.

Several streets and places are named after previous mayors : François Joly (from 1919 to 1944), Joseph Jan.

The mairie (City hall) is right in the centre of the town.

== Breton language ==
In 2008, 3.76% of children attended bilingual primary schools. The municipality signed the Ya d'ar brezhoneg charter on 1 October 2011.

The Breton name of the commune is also Bruz.

== Quarry accident ==
On 6 June 1884, a quarry accident took place in Bruz that killed eight people, including two children. The catastrophe du Boël (disaster of Boël) resulted from a landslide that occurred in a quarry used to extract red shale for use in building. The quarry was located in a location called Boël

== See also ==
- Communes of the Ille-et-Vilaine department
- The works of Jean Fréour Sculptor of work in Bruz church

Bruz houses 2e régiment du matériel (2nd RMAT).
