= Canton of Bruz =

Coordinates: 48.0189°N 1.6781°W

Bruz
- Canton
- Country: France
- Region: Brittany
- Department: Ille-et-Vilaine
- No. of communes: {{{nbcomm}}}
- Area: 107.21 km^{2} (41.39 sq mi)
- Population (2023): 46,392
  - Density: 432.72/km^{2} (1,120.7/sq mi)
- INSEE code: 35 04

The Canton of Bruz is a canton of France, in the Ille-et-Vilaine département. At the French canton reorganisation which came into effect in March 2015, the canton was reduced from 7 to 5 communes:

- Bruz
- Chartres-de-Bretagne
- Laillé
- Noyal-Châtillon-sur-Seiche
- Pont-Péan
