= Noyal-Châtillon-sur-Seiche =

Noyal-Châtillon-sur-Seiche Nóyau-Chastilhon (Gallo) Noal-Kastellan (Breton)
- Commune
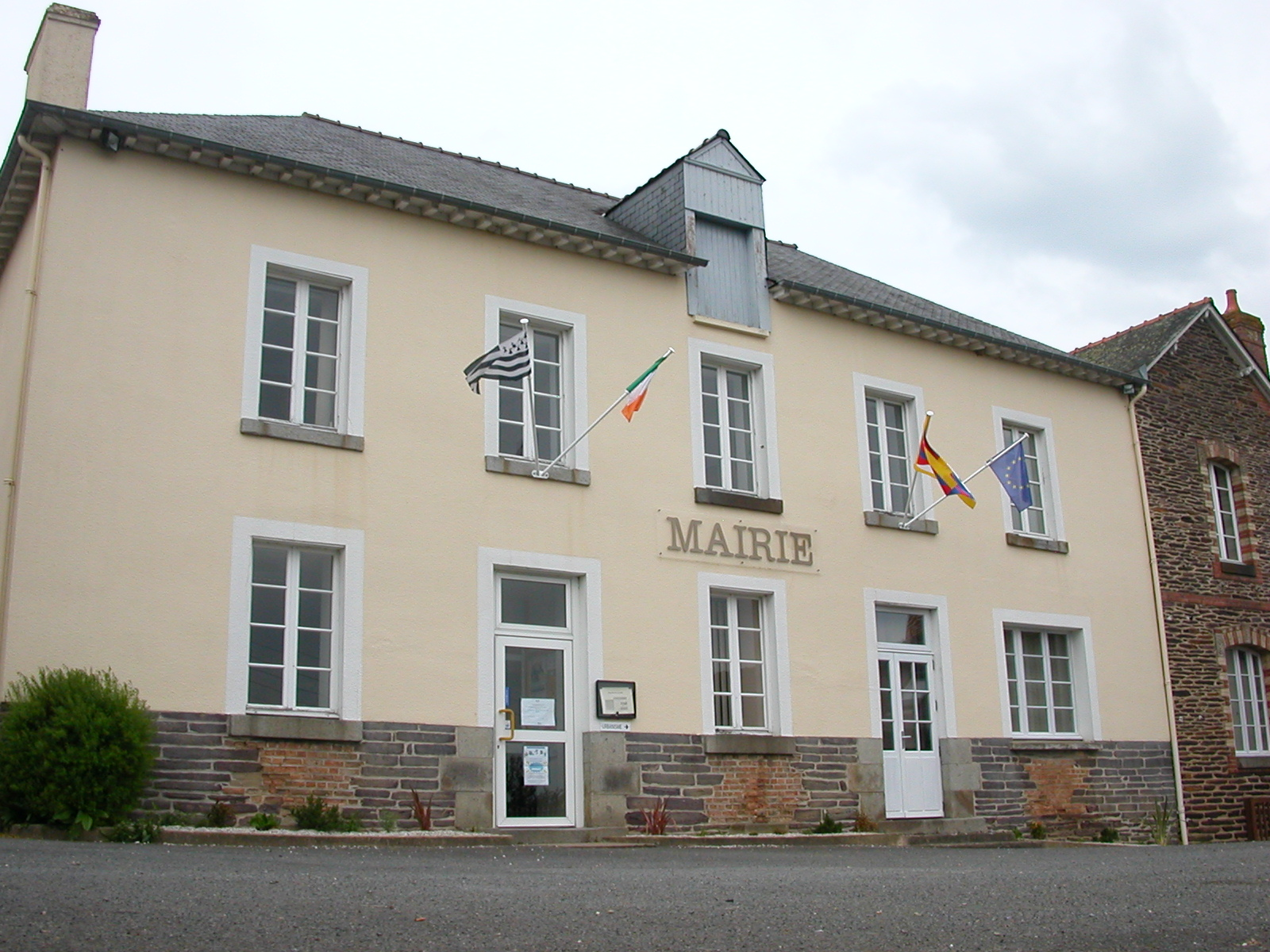
- The town hall of Noyal-Châtillon-sur-Seiche

- Coat of arms
- Location of Noyal-Châtillon-sur-Seiche
- Location within France Location within Brittany
- Coordinates: 48°02′39″N 1°39′23″W
- Country: France
- Region: Brittany
- Department: Ille-et-Vilaine
- Arrondissement: Rennes
- Canton: Bruz
- Intercommunality: Rennes Métropole

Government
  - Mayor (2020–2026): Sébastien Guéret
- Area^{1}: 26.51 km^{2} (10.24 sq mi)
- Highest elevation: 54 m (177 ft)
- Lowest elevation: 17 m (56 ft)
- Population (2023): 8,359
  - Density: 315.3/km^{2} (816.7/sq mi)
- Time zone: UTC+01:00 (CET)
  - Summer (DST): UTC+02:00 (CEST)
- INSEE/Postal code: 35206 /35230
- ^{1} French Land Register data, which excludes lakes, ponds, glaciers > 1 km^{2} (0.386 sq mi or 247 acres) and river estuaries.

Noyal-Châtillon-sur-Seiche (French pronunciation: [nwajal ʃatijɔ̃ syʁ sɛʃ]; Gallo: Nóyau-Chastilhon, Breton: Noal-Kastellan) is a commune in the Ille-et-Vilaine department of Brittany in northwestern France. As the name suggests it is on the Seiche river.

== Population ==
Inhabitants of Noyal-Châtillon-sur-Seiche are called castelnodais in French.

Historical population
Year	Pop.	±% p.a.
1968	2,147	—
1975	2,954	+4.66%
1982	3,168	+1.00%
1990	4,313	+3.93%
1999	5,635	+3.02%
2007	5,822	+0.41%
2012	6,688	+2.81%
2017	6,919	+0.68%
2023	8,359	+3.20%
Source: INSEE

== See also ==
- Communes of the Ille-et-Vilaine department
