= Ruelisheim =

Commune in Grand Est, France

- Commune
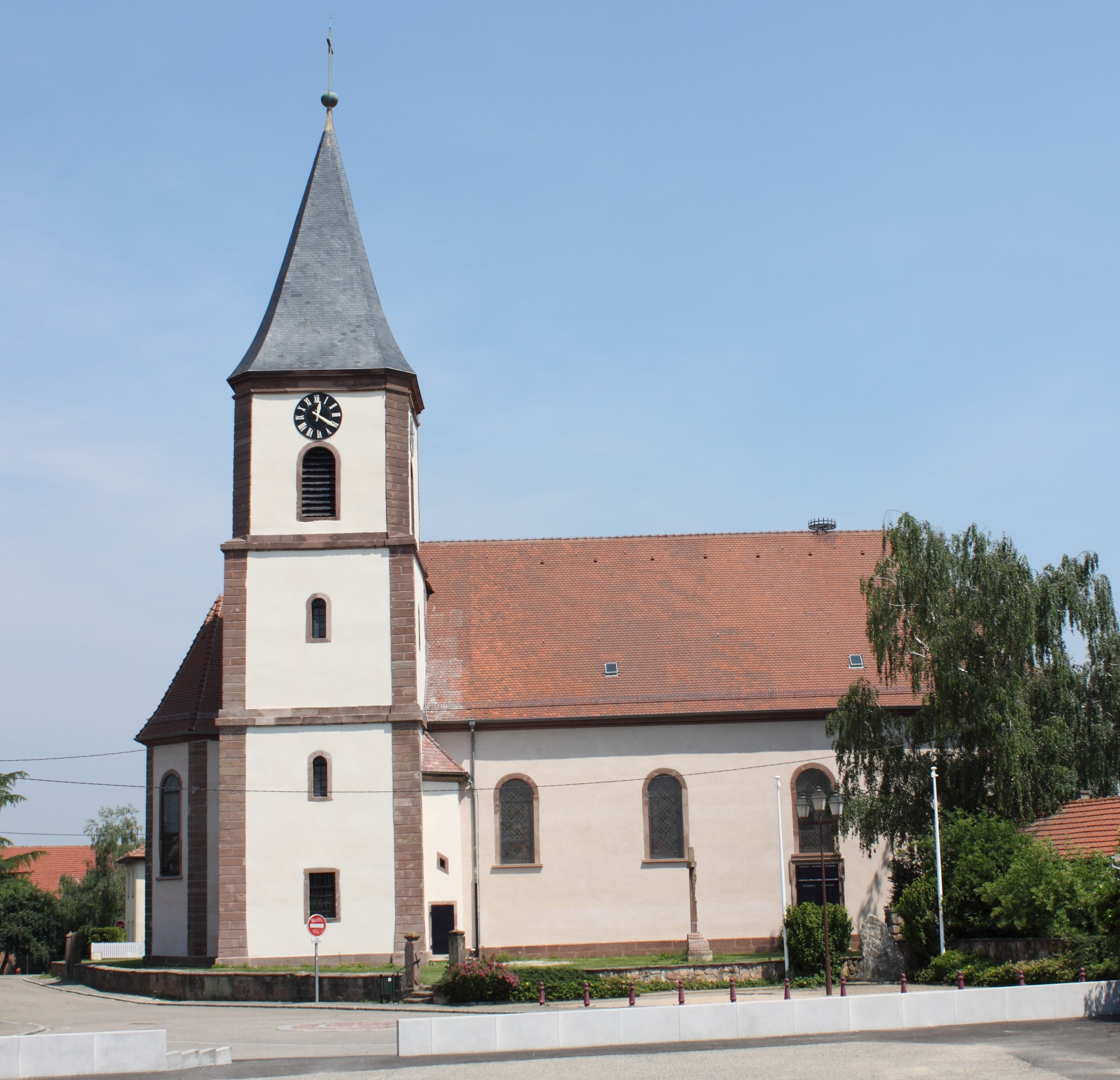
- The church in Ruelisheim

- Coat of arms
- Location of Ruelisheim
- Location within France Location within Grand Est
- Coordinates: 47°49′26″N 7°21′32″E
- Country: France
- Region: Grand Est
- Department: Haut-Rhin
- Arrondissement: Mulhouse
- Canton: Wittenheim
- Intercommunality: Mulhouse Alsace Agglomération

Government
  - Mayor (2020–2026): Francis Dussourd
- Area^{1}: 7.27 km^{2} (2.81 sq mi)
- Elevation: 225 m (738 ft)
- Highest elevation: 234 m (768 ft)
- Lowest elevation: 221 m (725 ft)
- Population (2023): 2,519
  - Density: 346/km^{2} (897/sq mi)
- Time zone: UTC+01:00 (CET)
  - Summer (DST): UTC+02:00 (CEST)
- INSEE/Postal code: 68289 /68270
- ^{1} French Land Register data, which excludes lakes, ponds, glaciers > 1 km^{2} (0.386 sq mi or 247 acres) and river estuaries.

Ruelisheim (French pronunciation: [ʁylisaim]; German: Rulisheim) is a commune in the Haut-Rhin department in Alsace in north-eastern France. It forms part of the Mulhouse Alsace Agglomération, the inter-communal local government body for the Mulhouse conurbation.

== Population ==
Historical population
Year	Pop.	±% p.a.
1968	1,312	—
1975	1,546	+2.37%
1982	1,890	+2.91%
1990	2,653	+4.33%
1999	2,657	+0.02%
2007	2,451	−1.00%
2012	2,320	−1.09%
2017	2,297	−0.20%
2023	2,519	+1.55%
Source: INSEE

== See also ==
- Communes of the Haut-Rhin department
