= Staffelfelden =

Commune in Grand Est, France

- Commune
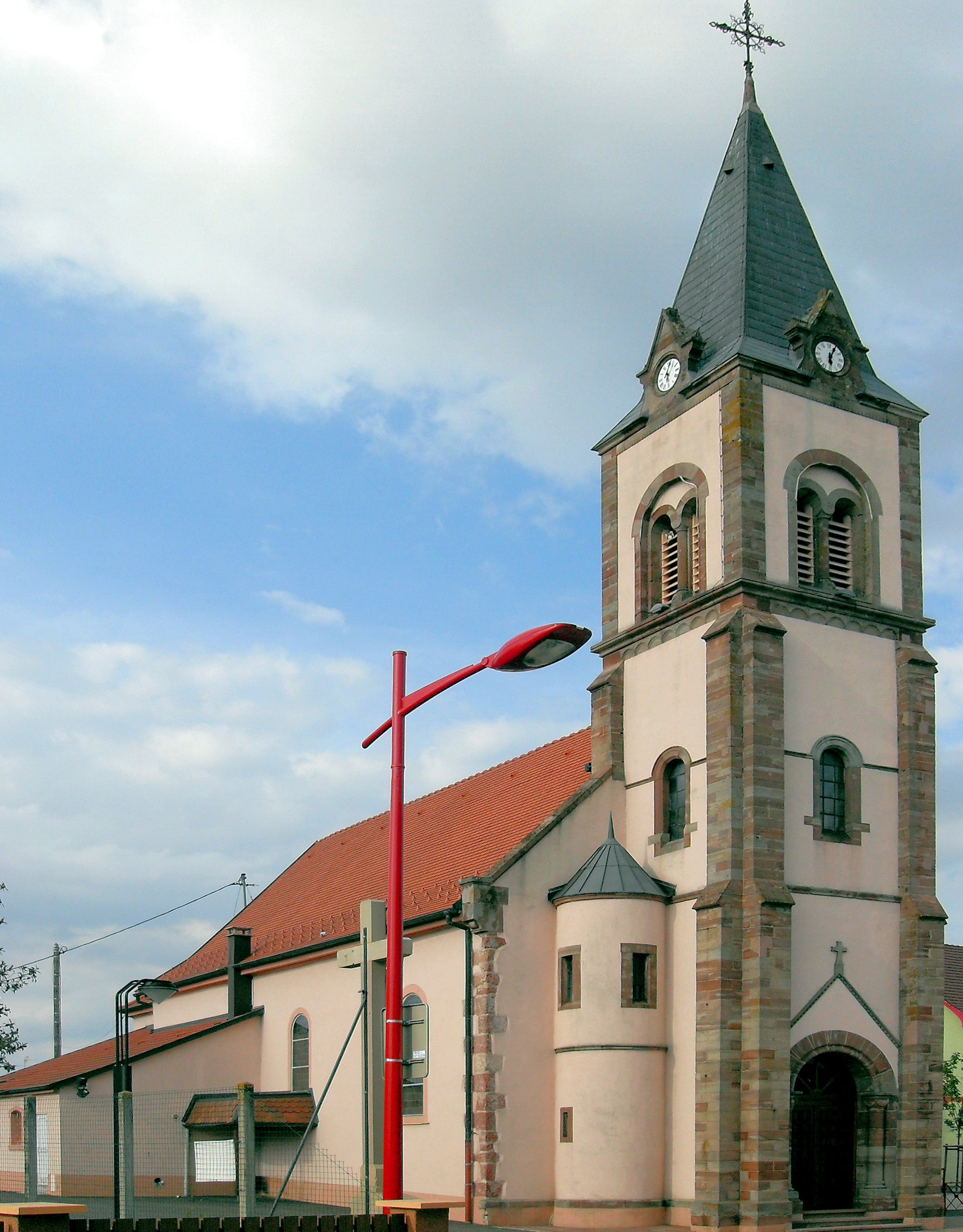
- The church in Staffelfelden

- Coat of arms
- Location of Staffelfelden
- Location within France Location within Grand Est
- Coordinates: 47°49′38″N 7°15′14″E
- Country: France
- Region: Grand Est
- Department: Haut-Rhin
- Arrondissement: Mulhouse
- Canton: Wittenheim
- Intercommunality: Mulhouse Alsace Agglomération

Government
  - Mayor (2020–2026): Thierry Belloni
- Area^{1}: 7.42 km^{2} (2.86 sq mi)
- Elevation: 255 m (837 ft)
- Highest elevation: 270 m (890 ft)
- Lowest elevation: 238 m (781 ft)
- Population (2023): 4,072
  - Density: 549/km^{2} (1,420/sq mi)
- Time zone: UTC+01:00 (CET)
  - Summer (DST): UTC+02:00 (CEST)
- INSEE/Postal code: 68321 /68850
- ^{1} French Land Register data, which excludes lakes, ponds, glaciers > 1 km^{2} (0.386 sq mi or 247 acres) and river estuaries.

Staffelfelden (French pronunciation: [stafəlfɛldœn]) is a commune in the Haut-Rhin department in Grand Est in north-eastern France. It forms part of the Mulhouse Alsace Agglomération, the inter-communal local government body for the Mulhouse conurbation.

== Population ==
Historical population
Year	Pop.	±% p.a.
1968	3,234	—
1975	3,513	+1.19%
1982	3,465	−0.20%
1990	3,331	−0.49%
1999	3,553	+0.72%
2007	3,600	+0.16%
2012	3,727	+0.70%
2017	3,959	+1.22%
2023	4,072	+0.47%
Source: INSEE

== See also ==
- Communes of the Haut-Rhin department
