= Pulversheim =

Commune in Grand Est, France

- Commune
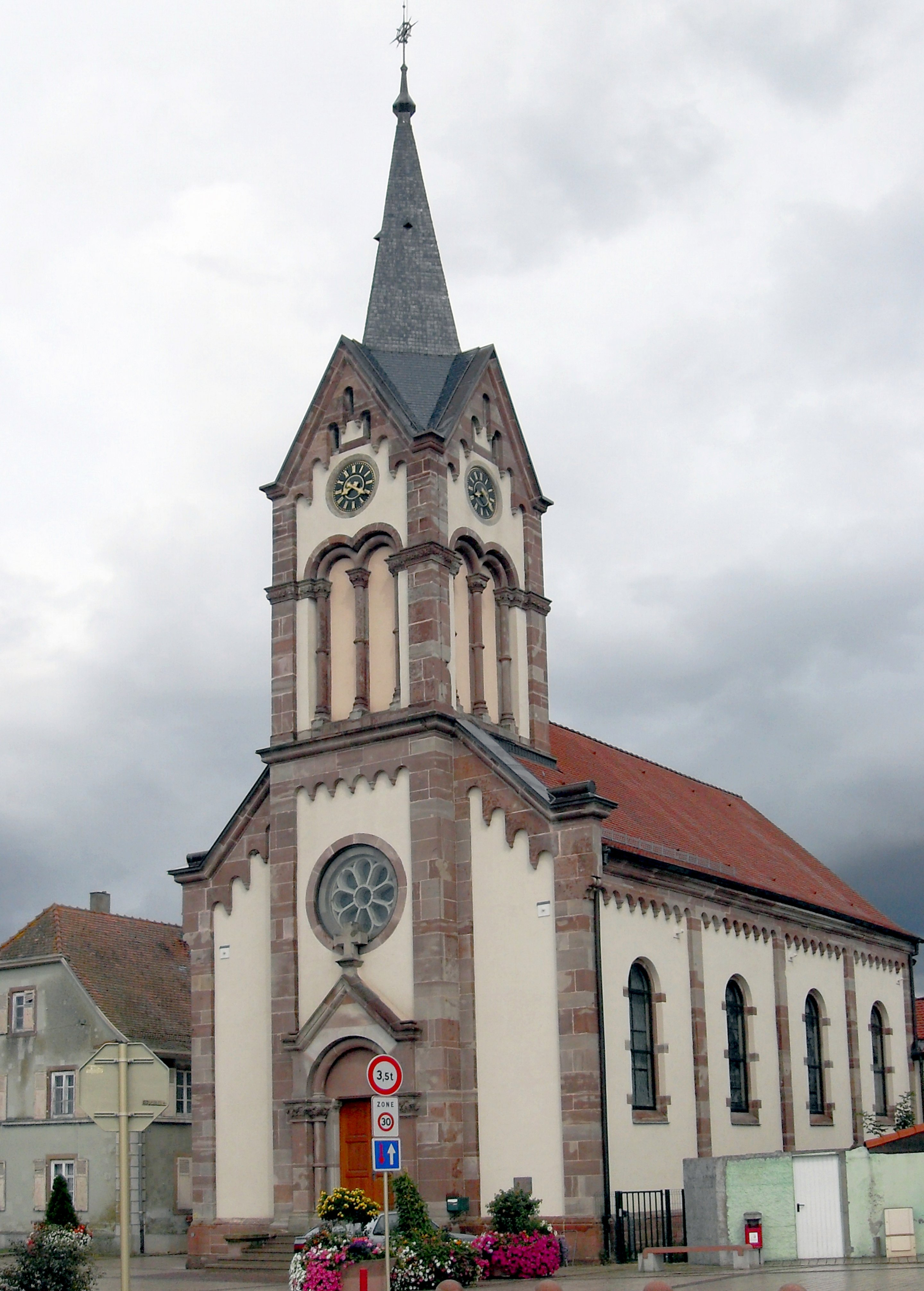
- The church in Pulversheim

- Coat of arms
- Location of Pulversheim
- Location within France Location within Grand Est
- Coordinates: 47°50′16″N 7°18′23″E
- Country: France
- Region: Grand Est
- Department: Haut-Rhin
- Arrondissement: Mulhouse
- Canton: Wittenheim
- Intercommunality: Mulhouse Alsace Agglomération

Government
  - Mayor (2020–2026): Christophe Toranelli
- Area^{1}: 8.56 km^{2} (3.31 sq mi)
- Elevation: 235 m (771 ft)
- Highest elevation: 243 m (797 ft)
- Lowest elevation: 222 m (728 ft)
- Population (2023): 3,069
  - Density: 359/km^{2} (929/sq mi)
- Time zone: UTC+01:00 (CET)
  - Summer (DST): UTC+02:00 (CEST)
- INSEE/Postal code: 68258 /68840
- ^{1} French Land Register data, which excludes lakes, ponds, glaciers > 1 km^{2} (0.386 sq mi or 247 acres) and river estuaries.

Pulversheim (French pronunciation: [pylvəʁsaim]) is a commune in the Haut-Rhin department in Grand Est in north-eastern France. It forms part of the Mulhouse Alsace Agglomération, the inter-communal local government body for the Mulhouse conurbation.

== Population ==
Historical population
Year	Pop.	±% p.a.
1968	1,856	—
1975	2,130	+1.99%
1982	2,006	−0.85%
1990	2,021	+0.09%
1999	2,266	+1.28%
2007	2,819	+2.77%
2012	2,925	+0.74%
2017	2,960	+0.24%
2023	3,069	+0.60%
Source: INSEE

== See also ==
- Communes of the Haut-Rhin department
