= Matériel (French Army) =

Military materiel arm of the French Army

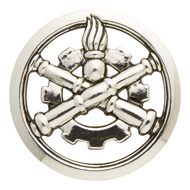
Matériel beret insignia, showing a cogwheel, two cannons and a grenade.

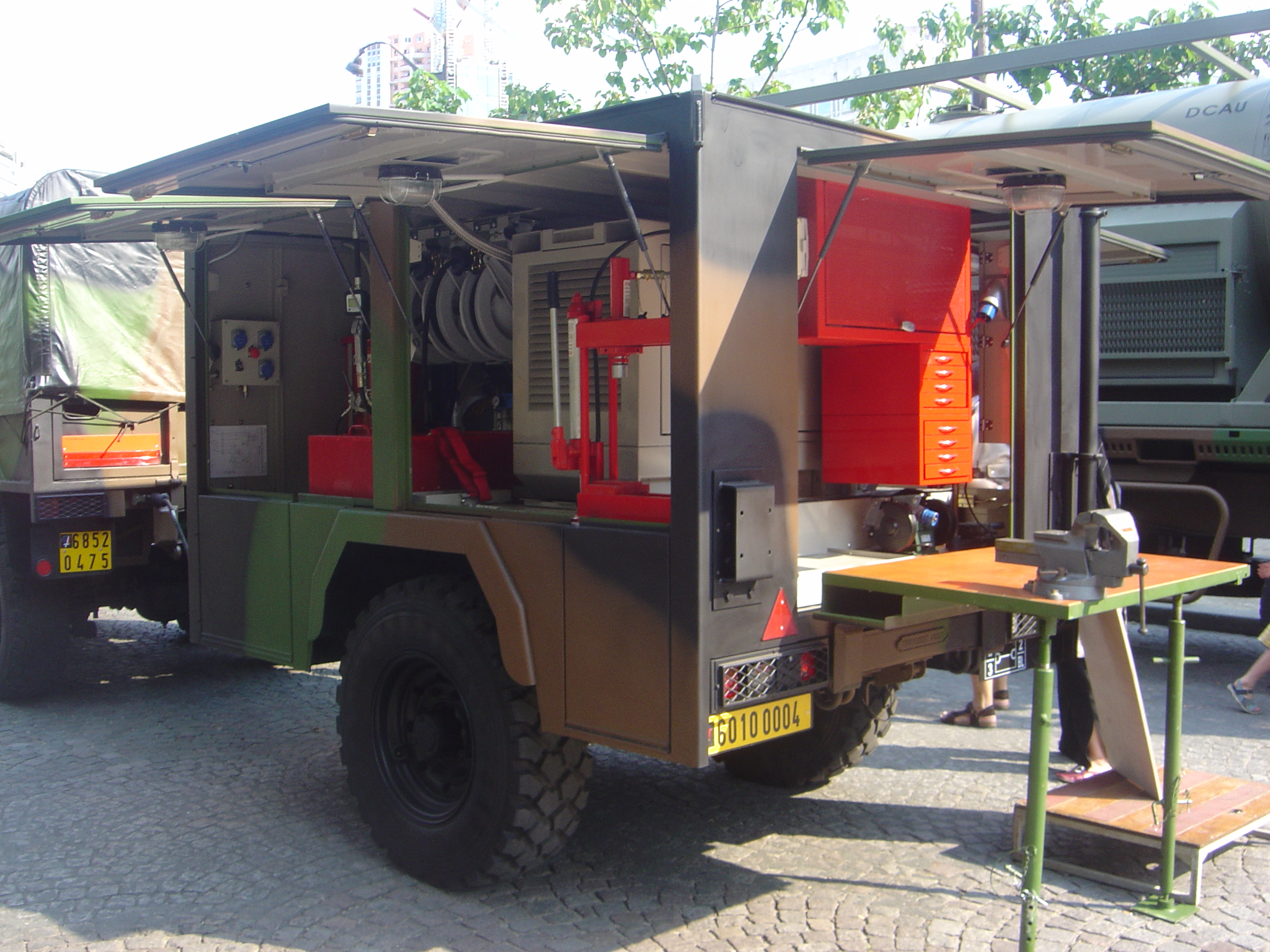
French military mobile workshop.

Matériel is one of the branches (armes) of French Army specialised in maintenance and repair of equipment or hardware (Materiel).

Regiments

- 1er régiment du matériel (1st RMAT) Woippy (57)
- 2e régiment du matériel (2nd RMAT) Bruz (35)
- 3e Régiment du Matériel (3rd RMAT) Muret (31)
- 4e régiment du matériel (4th RMAT) Nîmes (30)
- 5e régiment du matériel (5th RMAT) Strasbourg (67)
- 6e régiment du matériel (6th RMAT) Besançon (25)
- 7e régiment du matériel (7th RMAT) Lyon (69)
- 8e régiment du matériel (8th RMAT) Mourmelon (51)
- 9e Bataillon du matériel (9th BMAT) Poitiers (86)

Bases

- 5e base de soutien du matériel (5th BSMAT) Draguignan (83)
- 12e base de soutien du matériel (12th BSMAT) Salbris (41)
- 13e base de soutien du matériel (13th BSMAT) Clermont-Ferrand (63)
- 14e Base de Soutien du Matériel (14th BSMAT) Poitiers (86)
- 15e base de soutien du matériel (15th BSMAT) Phalsbourg (57)

School

- École du matériel - Les Écoles Militaires de Bourges (EMB) Bourges (18)

== See also ==
- Military logistics
