= Pont-Péan =

Pont-Péan Pont-Riaunt (Gallo) Pont-Pagan (Breton)
- Commune
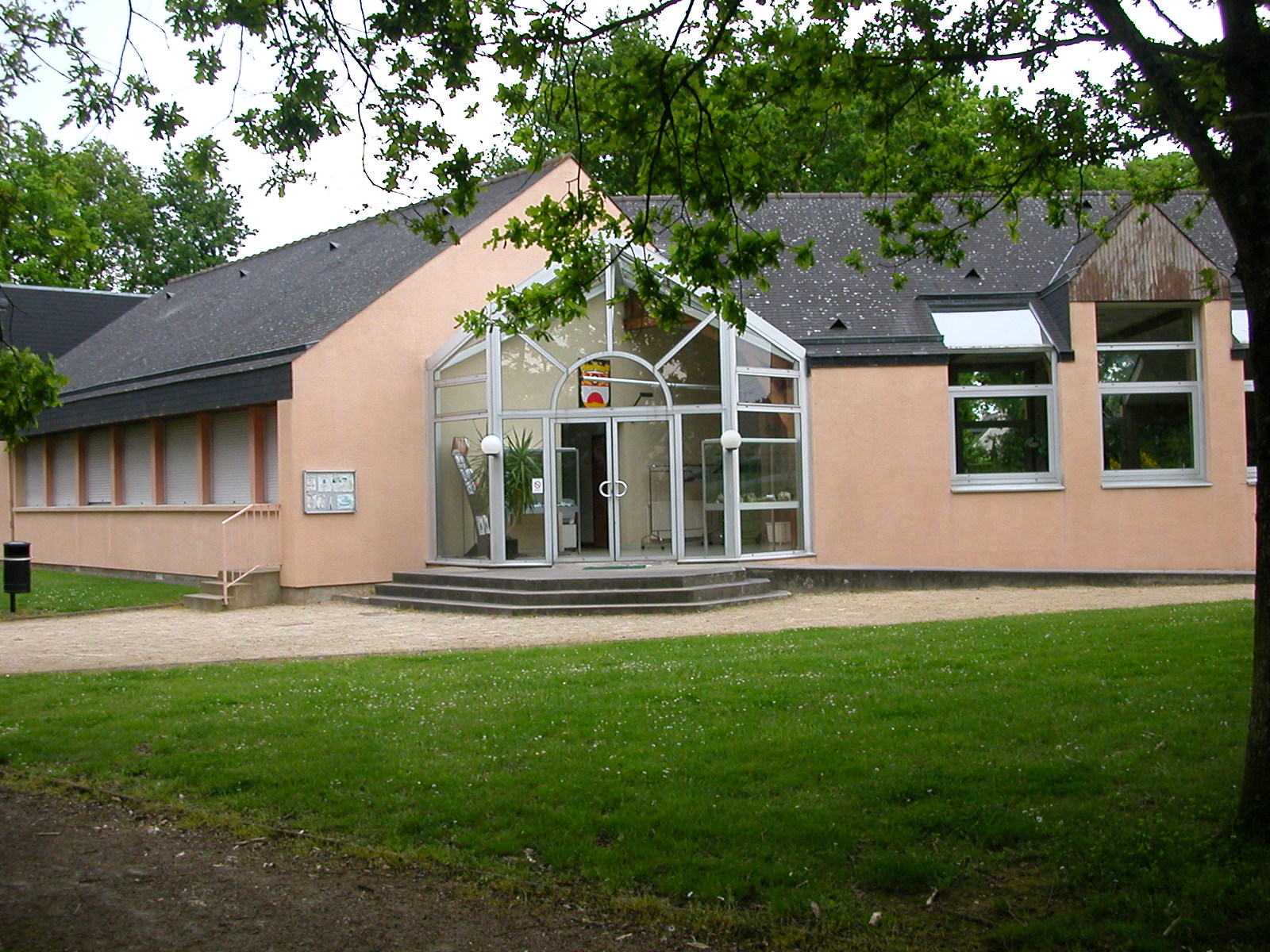
- Town hall

- Coat of arms
- Location of Pont-Péan
- Location within France Location within Brittany
- Coordinates: 48°00′49″N 1°42′12″W
- Country: France
- Region: Brittany
- Department: Ille-et-Vilaine
- Arrondissement: Rennes
- Canton: Bruz
- Intercommunality: Rennes Métropole

Government
  - Mayor (2020–2026): Michel Demolder
- Area^{1}: 8.76 km^{2} (3.38 sq mi)
- Highest elevation: 44 m (144 ft)
- Lowest elevation: 17 m (56 ft)
- Population (2023): 4,245
  - Density: 485/km^{2} (1,260/sq mi)
- Time zone: UTC+01:00 (CET)
  - Summer (DST): UTC+02:00 (CEST)
- INSEE/Postal code: 35363 /35131
- ^{1} French Land Register data, which excludes lakes, ponds, glaciers > 1 km^{2} (0.386 sq mi or 247 acres) and river estuaries.

Pont-Péan (French pronunciation: [pɔ̃ peɑ̃]; Breton: Pont-Pagan; Gallo: Pont-Riaunt) is a commune in the Ille-et-Vilaine department of Brittany in northwestern France. It was created in 1986 from part of the commune of Saint-Erblon.

== Population ==
Inhabitants of Pont-Péan are called pont-péannais in French. Population data refer to the commune in its geography as of January 2025.

Historical population
Year	Pop.	±% p.a.
1968	1,355	—
1975	1,287	−0.73%
1982	1,565	+2.83%
1990	2,011	+3.18%
1999	3,213	+5.34%
2007	3,661	+1.65%
2012	3,808	+0.79%
2017	4,463	+3.23%
2023	4,245	−0.83%
Source: INSEE

== See also ==
- Communes of the Ille-et-Vilaine department
