= Seiche (river) =

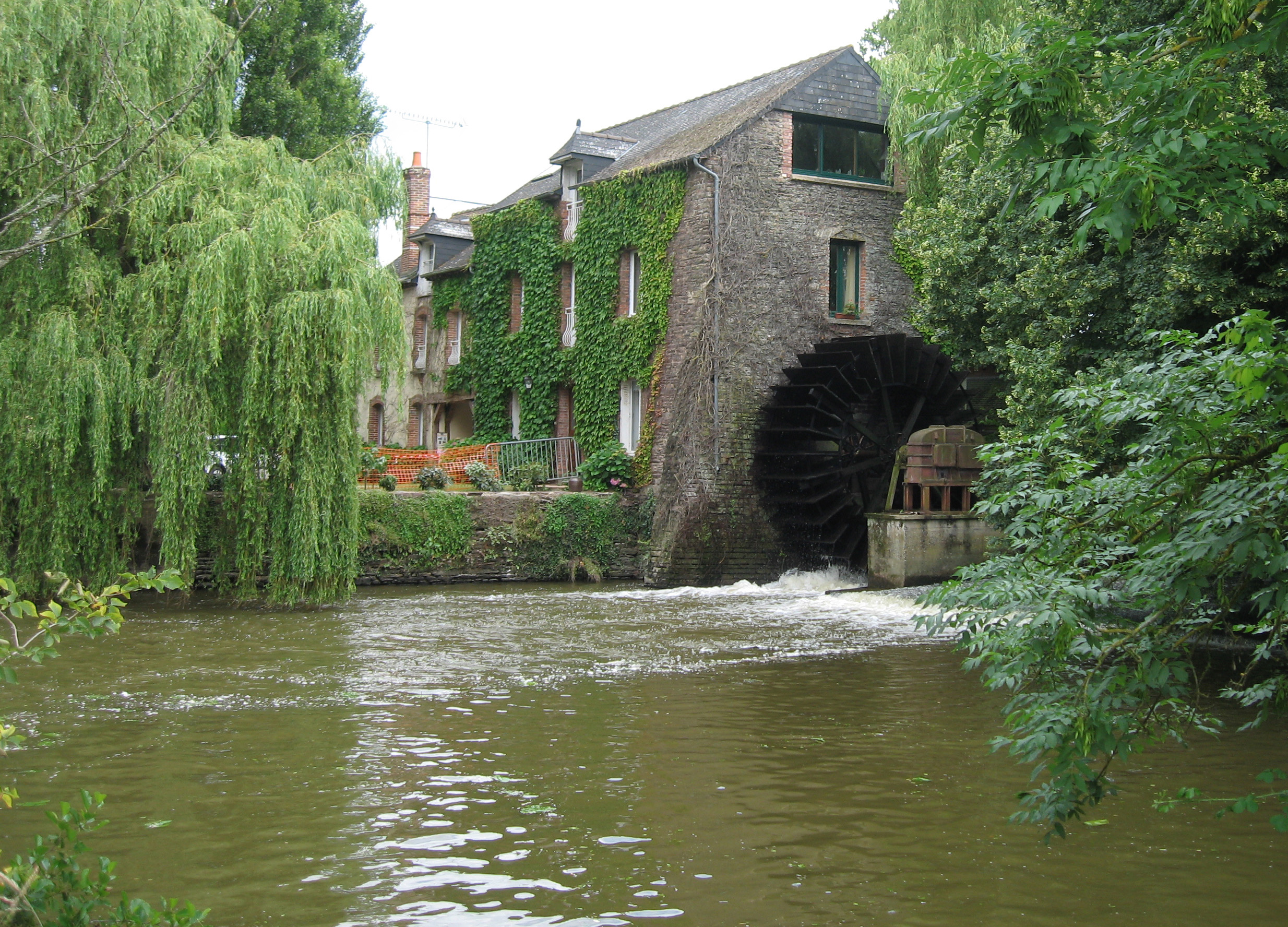
- Watermill near Noyal-Châtillon-sur-Seiche

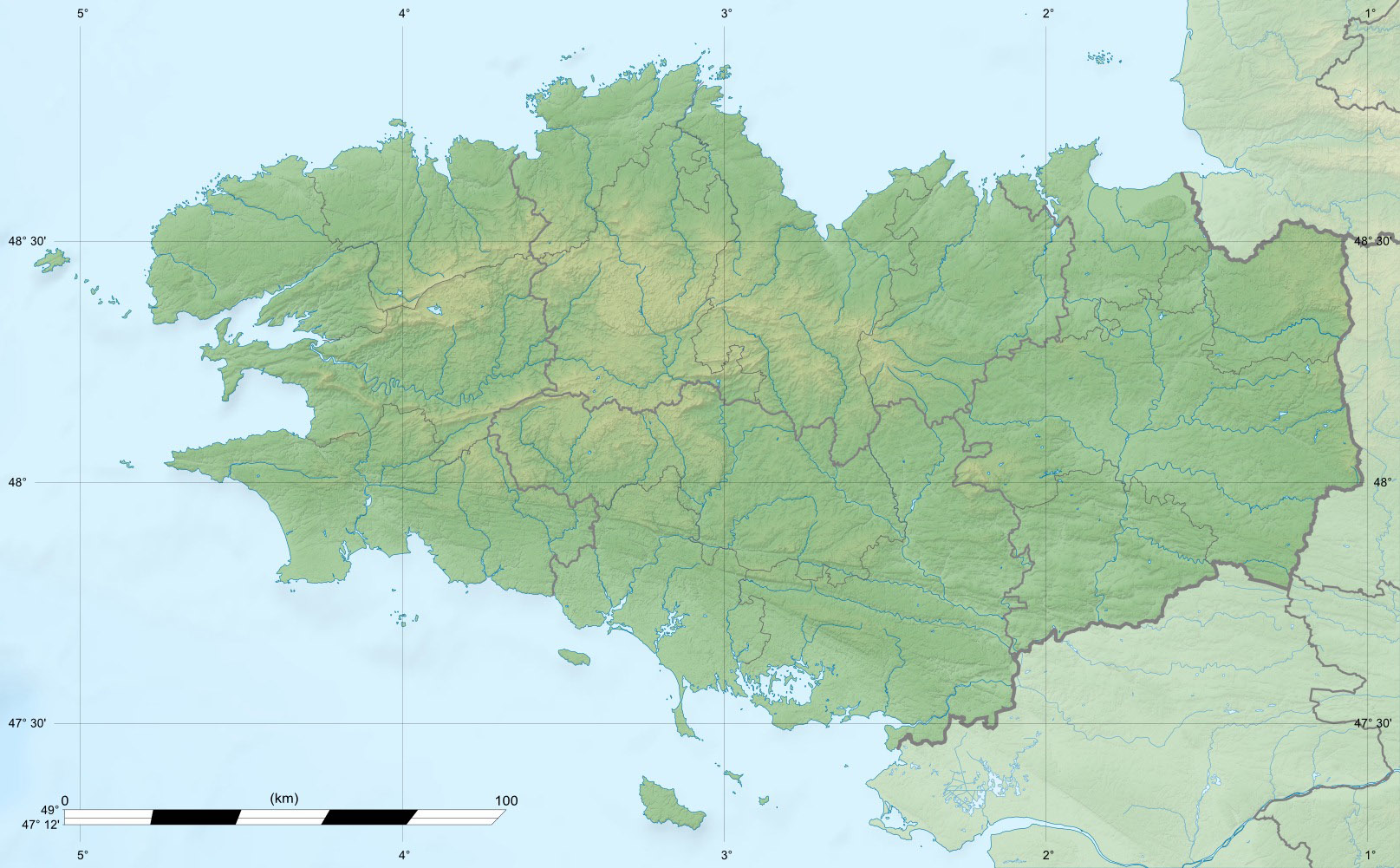
- Location within Brittany Location within France

Location
- Country: France

Physical characteristics
- Mouth: Vilaine
  - coordinates: 47°59′51″N 1°45′19″W
- Length: 97.3 km (60.5 mi)

Basin features
- Progression: Vilaine→ Atlantic Ocean

The Seiche is a 97.3 km (60.5 mi) long river in western France located in the departments of Mayenne (Pays de la Loire) and Ille-et-Vilaine (Brittany). It is a left tributary of the river Vilaine. It flows into the Vilaine near Bruz, south of Rennes.
