= Canton of Wittenheim =

Coordinates: 47.81°N 7.34°E

The canton of Wittenheim is an administrative division of the Haut-Rhin department, northeastern France. Its borders were modified at the French canton reorganisation which came into effect in March 2015. Its seat is in Wittenheim.

It consists of the following communes:

1. Berrwiller
2. Bollwiller
3. Feldkirch
4. Pulversheim
5. Ruelisheim
6. Staffelfelden
7. Ungersheim
8. Wittelsheim
9. Wittenheim
