= Laillé =

Laillé Lalieg (Breton)
- Commune
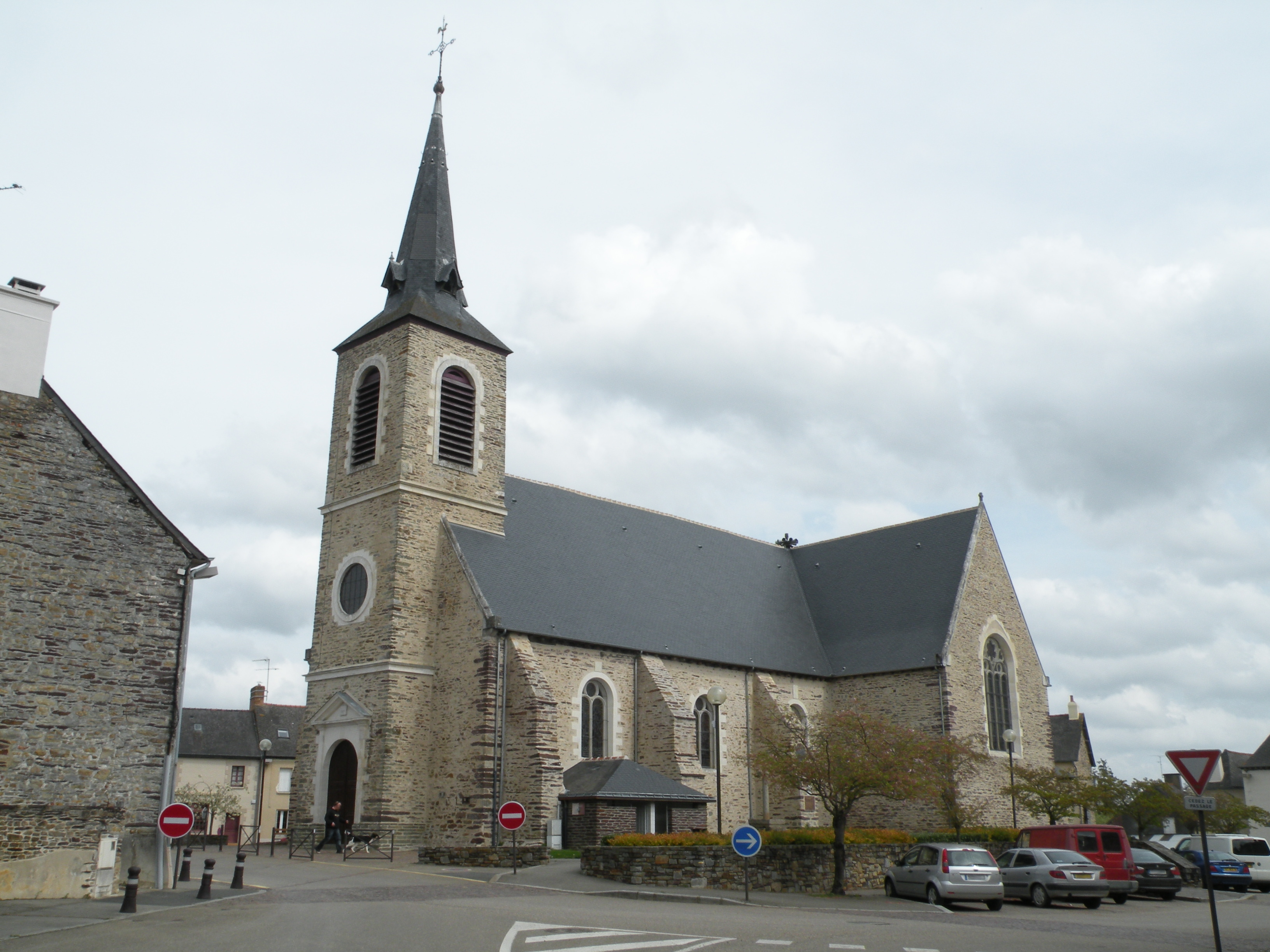
- The church of Saint-Pierre, in Laillé

- Coat of arms
- Location of Laillé
- Location within France Location within Brittany
- Coordinates: 47°58′43″N 1°43′02″W
- Country: France
- Region: Brittany
- Department: Ille-et-Vilaine
- Arrondissement: Rennes
- Canton: Bruz
- Intercommunality: Rennes Métropole

Government
  - Mayor (2020–2026): Françoise Louapre
- Area^{1}: 32.04 km^{2} (12.37 sq mi)
- Highest elevation: 110 m (360 ft)
- Lowest elevation: 5 m (16 ft)
- Population (2023): 5,225
  - Density: 163.1/km^{2} (422.4/sq mi)
- Time zone: UTC+01:00 (CET)
  - Summer (DST): UTC+02:00 (CEST)
- INSEE/Postal code: 35139 /35890
- ^{1} French Land Register data, which excludes lakes, ponds, glaciers > 1 km^{2} (0.386 sq mi or 247 acres) and river estuaries.

Laillé (French pronunciation: [laje]; Breton: Lalieg) is a commune in the Ille-et-Vilaine department in Brittany in northwestern France.

Laillé joined the intercommunality Rennes Métropole on 1 July 2012.

== Population ==
Inhabitants of Laillé are called Lailléens in French.

Historical population
Year	Pop.	±% p.a.
1968	1,336	—
1975	1,497	+1.64%
1982	2,411	+7.05%
1990	2,973	+2.65%
1999	3,558	+2.02%
2007	4,393	+2.67%
2012	4,868	+2.07%
2017	5,026	+0.64%
2023	5,225	+0.65%
Source: INSEE

== See also ==
- Communes of the Ille-et-Vilaine department
