= Woippy =

- Commune
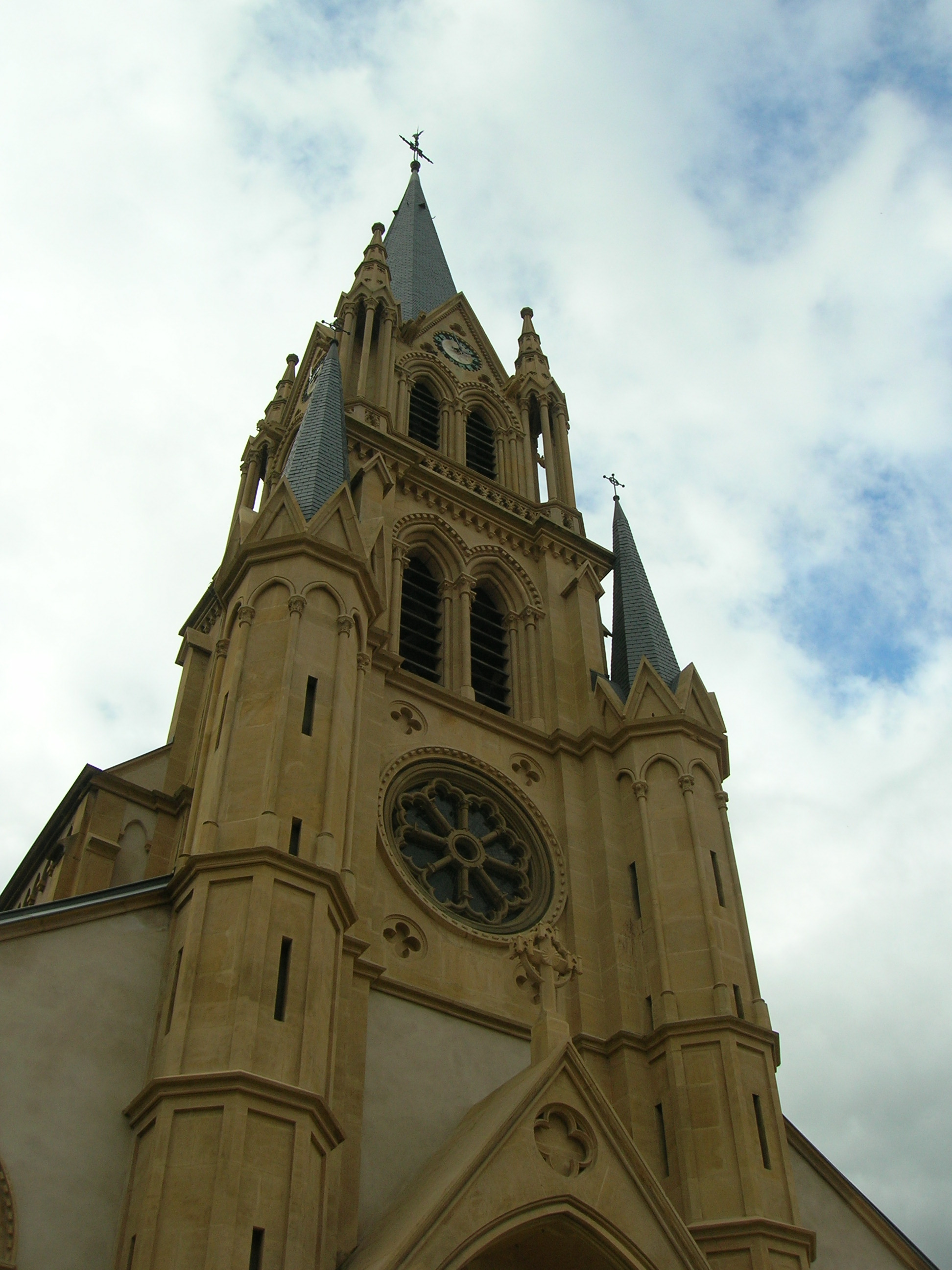
- Woippy Church, rebuilt in 1850

- Coat of arms
- Location of Woippy
- Location within France Location within Grand Est
- Coordinates: 49°09′07″N 6°09′08″E
- Country: France
- Region: Grand Est
- Department: Moselle
- Arrondissement: Metz
- Canton: Le Sillon Mosellan
- Intercommunality: Metz Métropole

Government
  - Mayor (2020–2026): Cédric Gouth
- Area^{1}: 14.59 km^{2} (5.63 sq mi)
- Elevation: 200 m (660 ft)
- Highest elevation: 228 m (748 ft)
- Lowest elevation: 160 m (520 ft)
- Population (2023): 14,967
  - Density: 1,026/km^{2} (2,657/sq mi)
- Demonym: Woippycien(ne)s
- Time zone: UTC+01:00 (CET)
  - Summer (DST): UTC+02:00 (CEST)
- INSEE/Postal code: 57751 /57140
- Website: www.mairie-woippy.fr
- ^{1} French Land Register data, which excludes lakes, ponds, glaciers > 1 km^{2} (0.386 sq mi or 247 acres) and river estuaries.

Woippy (French pronunciation: [vwapi]; German: Wappingen, [ˈvapɪŋən]; Lorraine Franconian: Weppech) is a French commune in the Moselle department, Grand Est, located near Metz.

Woippy houses the 6th Régiment du matériel (6e RMAT).

Woippy-Triage is the largest classification yard in France.

== Population ==
Historical population
Year	Pop.	±% p.a.
1968	9,142	—
1975	13,393	+5.61%
1982	13,816	+0.45%
1990	14,325	+0.45%
1999	13,755	−0.45%
2007	13,150	−0.56%
2012	13,133	−0.03%
2017	14,214	+1.59%
2023	14,967	+0.86%
Source: INSEE

== See also ==
- Communes of the Moselle department
