= L'Alsace =

French regional daily newspaper

- Logo of L'Alsace
- Type: Daily newspaper
- Founded: November 1944
- Language: French
- Headquarters: Mulhouse
- Country: France
- ISSN: 2102-6882
- Website: www.lalsace.fr

L'Alsace (French pronunciation: [lalzas]) is a regional daily French newspaper covering the Alsace region.

== History and profile ==
L'Alsace was created in November 1944. In addition to its headquarters in Mulhouse, L'Alsace has 15 local agencies in the Haut-Rhin département (Altkirch, Cernay, Colmar, Guebwiller, Masevaux, Mulhouse, Saint-Louis, Sainte-Marie-aux-Mines, Thann and Wittelsheim), two in the Bas-Rhin département (Sélestat and Strasbourg), one in the Territoire de Belfort département (Belfort), one in the Doubs département (Montbéliard), and one in the Haute-Saône département (Lure).

A French-German bilingual edition is also published, representing 4.72 percent of the newspaper's global sales in 2003. The publishing director and manager of the paper is Jean-Dominique Pretet.

Circulation of the newspaper Source : ACPM
Year	Circulation
2018	73,556
2017	76,272
2016	78,910
2015	80,871
2014	83,254
2013	-
2012	96,858
2011	99,856
2010	101,127
2009	103,654
2008	105,786
2007	107,202
2006	108,577
2005	111,204

Le Pays was a related paper sold in the Franche-Comté region, but was sold to a competitor in 2013.
