= Wittenheim =

Commune in Grand Est, France

Wittenheim Wìttana (Alsatian)
- Commune
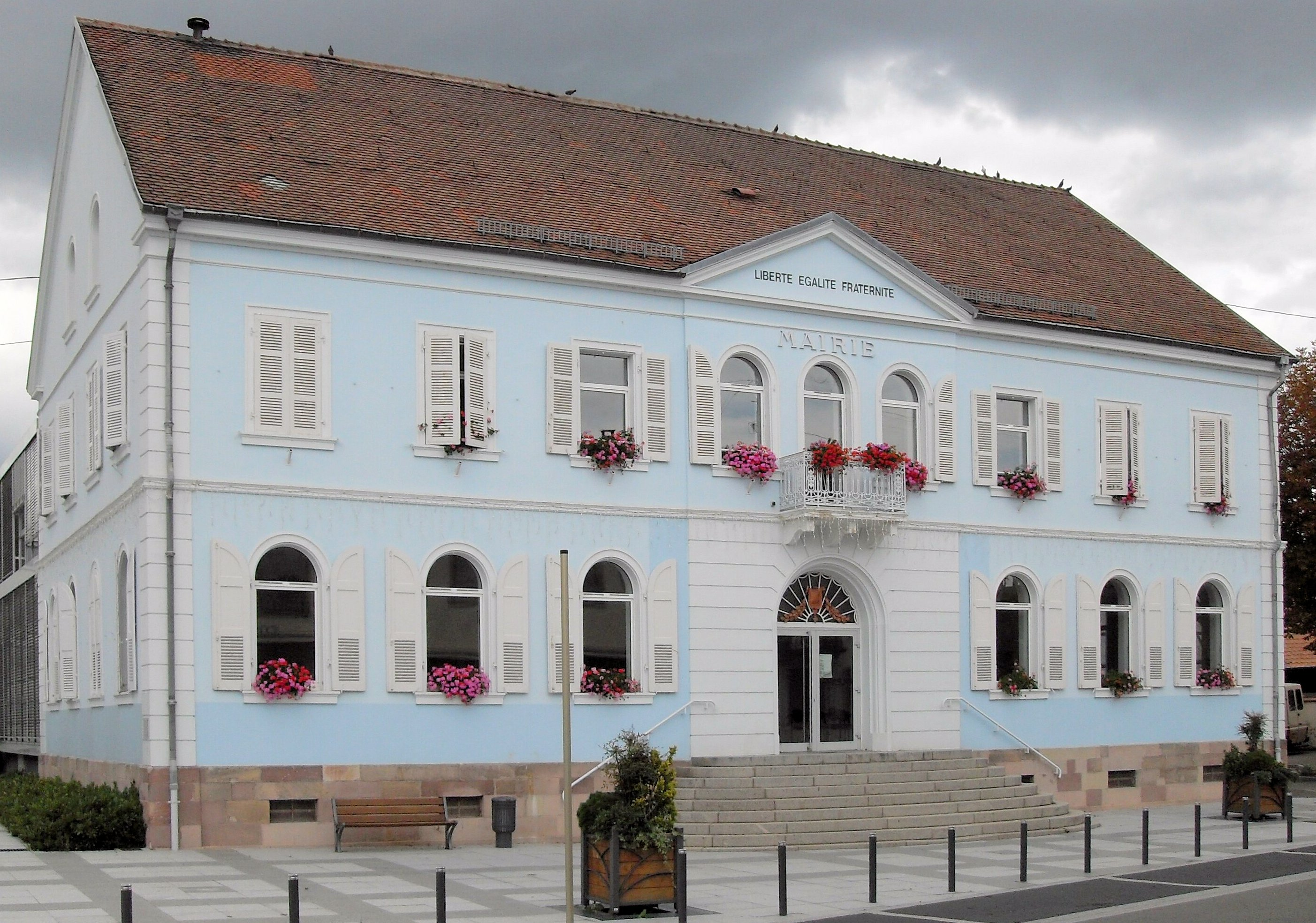
- The town hall

- Coat of arms
- Location of Wittenheim
- Location within France Location within Grand Est
- Coordinates: 47°48′29″N 7°20′15″E
- Country: France
- Region: Grand Est
- Department: Haut-Rhin
- Arrondissement: Mulhouse
- Canton: Wittenheim
- Intercommunality: Mulhouse Alsace

Government
  - Mayor (2020–2026): Antoine Homé (PS)
- Area^{1}: 19.01 km^{2} (7.34 sq mi)
- Elevation: 230 m (750 ft)
- Highest elevation: 254 m (833 ft)
- Lowest elevation: 223 m (732 ft)
- Population (2023): 15,553
  - Density: 818.1/km^{2} (2,119/sq mi)
- Time zone: UTC+01:00 (CET)
  - Summer (DST): UTC+02:00 (CEST)
- INSEE/Postal code: 68376 /68270
- Dialling codes: 0389
- ^{1} French Land Register data, which excludes lakes, ponds, glaciers > 1 km^{2} (0.386 sq mi or 247 acres) and river estuaries.

Wittenheim (French pronunciation: [vitənaim]; in Alsatian Wìttana, Alemannic German pronunciation: [ˈvɪd̥ana]) is a commune in the Haut-Rhin department, Grand Est, northeastern France. It is one of the northern suburbs of the city of Mulhouse, and forms part of the Mulhouse Alsace Agglomération, the inter-communal local government body for the Mulhouse conurbation. The commune contains two mining villages, the Cité Jeune-Bois and the Cité Sainte-Barbe.

== Population ==
Historical population
Year	Pop.	±% p.a.
1968	10,055	—
1975	12,562	+3.23%
1982	13,380	+0.91%
1990	14,324	+0.86%
1999	15,026	+0.53%
2007	14,451	−0.49%
2012	14,512	+0.08%
2017	14,317	−0.27%
2023	15,553	+1.39%
Source: INSEE

== See also ==
- Communes of the Haut-Rhin department
