= Wittelsheim =

Commune in Grand Est, France

Wittelsheim Wìttelsa
- Commune
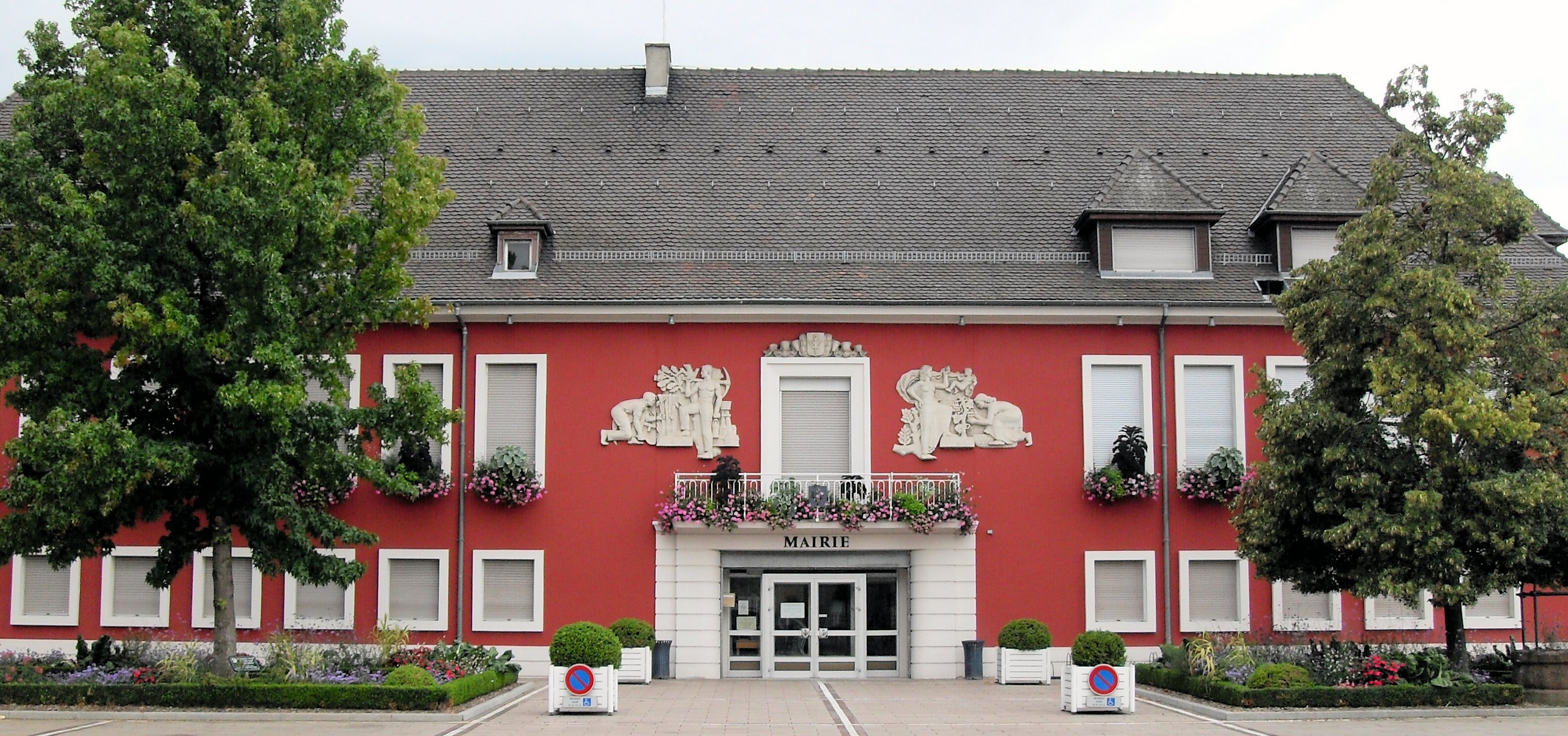
- The town hall

- Coat of arms
- Location of Wittelsheim
- Location within France Location within Grand Est
- Coordinates: 47°48′21″N 7°14′18″E
- Country: France
- Region: Grand Est
- Department: Haut-Rhin
- Arrondissement: Mulhouse
- Canton: Wittenheim
- Intercommunality: Mulhouse Alsace

Government
  - Mayor (2020–2026): Yves Goepfert
- Area^{1}: 23.63 km^{2} (9.12 sq mi)
- Elevation: 265 m (869 ft)
- Highest elevation: 285 m (935 ft)
- Lowest elevation: 239 m (784 ft)
- Population (2023): 10,645
  - Density: 450.5/km^{2} (1,167/sq mi)
- Time zone: UTC+01:00 (CET)
  - Summer (DST): UTC+02:00 (CEST)
- INSEE/Postal code: 68375 /68310
- ^{1} French Land Register data, which excludes lakes, ponds, glaciers > 1 km^{2} (0.386 sq mi or 247 acres) and river estuaries.

Wittelsheim (French pronunciation: [vitəlsaim] in Alsatian Wìttelsa), is a commune in the Haut-Rhin department in Grand Est in north-eastern France.

== Population ==
Historical population
Year	Pop.	±% p.a.
1968	10,088	—
1975	10,032	−0.08%
1982	10,177	+0.21%
1990	10,452	+0.33%
1999	10,226	−0.24%
2007	10,606	+0.46%
2012	10,573	−0.06%
2017	10,355	−0.42%
2023	10,645	+0.46%
Source: INSEE

== See also ==
- Communes of the Haut-Rhin department
