= Faluns Sea =

Ancient sea

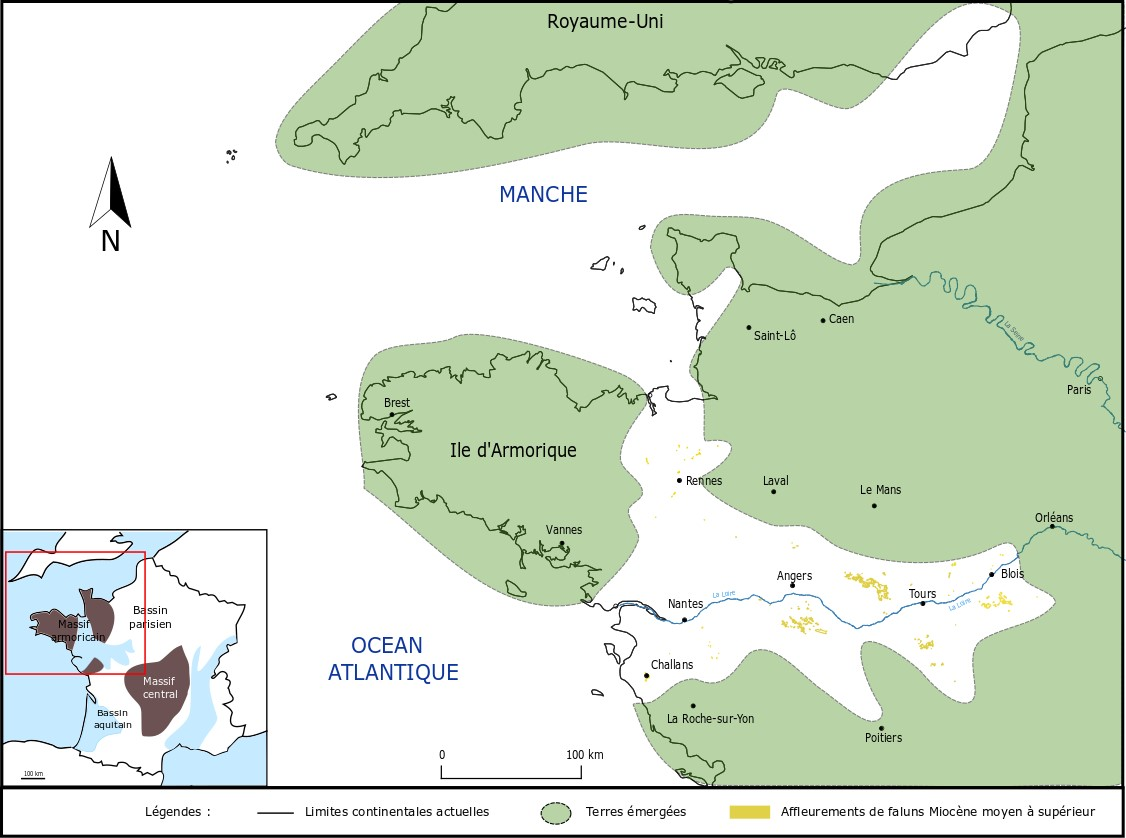
- Map of the Faluns Sea maximal extension during the Middle Miocene
- Interactive map of Faluns Sea
- Location: Western France
- Coordinates: 47.5°N 1°W
- Type: Former inland sea
- Max. depth: 80 m (260 ft)

The Faluns Sea is a former sea which covered Western France from 16 to 3.5 Ma. It spreads from Normandy to Vienne by forming an inlet through what is today Brittany, Anjou, Touraine and Blésois.

The withdrawal of the ancient sea left behind sedimentary stones rich in fragmentary shells called falun. The sea got its name from this sedimentary rock renown for its fossil richness.

== Description ==
This shallow sea whose average bathymetry was around 25 m is located on the European continental shelf. It filled a gulf from the Loire river to what is now Ille-et-Vilaine, Anjou, Touraine and Blésois, with an extension in the south towards Amberre, at twenty kilometers north-west of Poitiers.

This sea once separated the Paris Basin and the island that was the raised Armorican Massif in Brittany. It was a temperate to warm-temperate sea, whose temperature was estimated to 22 °C.

The faluns deposits are very rich in fossil remains of animals. Many Bryozoa can be found, as well as molluscs, fish such as sharks and rays, reptiles, terrestrial and marine mammals, few birds and wood remains.

In reality, there were three Faluns Seas. On three occasions, the sea transgressed on the continent and created deposits with abundant shell remains called falun.

== Geological history ==
For most of the Paleogene, the Armorican Massif, emerged since the Carboniferous, was outside of any maritime influence. From the Oligocene, marine incursions (also called transgressions) from the Atlantic Ocean became more important with marine deposits such as:

- Quessoy (Côtes-d'Armor);
- Nort-sur-Erdre (Loire-Atlantique);
- Saffré (Loire-Atlantique);
- Chartres-de-Bretagne (Ille-et-Vilaine).

At the end of the Middle Miocene, during the Serravallian, the marine transgression was at its apex. Marine deposits can be seen in:

- the Golfe d'Anvers;
- the Golfe de la Manche occidentale;
- the Golfe de la Loire;
- the Golfe d'Aquitaine;
- the Fosses préalpines (molasse).

These Serravallian deposits appear as sand or shell-bearing limestone called faluns.

== Deposits ==
=== Brittany faluns ===
In Brittany, faluns are known:

- by deposits in the south of Dinan: the Calcaire du Quiou (Le Quiou, Tréfumel, Saint-Juvat);
- in the south: Médréac, Plouasne, Landujan;
- in the east: Dingé, Feins, Gahard, Guipel, Saint-Sauveur-des-Landes;
- near Rennes, were they are studied and exploited:
  - Falun de Saint-Grégoire (Saint-Grégoire)
  - Falun de Chartres-de-Bretagne (Chartres-de-Bretagne, Bruz)
- others are localized in Lohéac, Noyal-sur-Brutz, Coësmes, Erbray, Vertou.

=== Vendée faluns ===
- Challans

=== Normandy faluns ===
In Normandy, those faluns are known:

- by deposits in Gouville-sur-Mer and Picauville.

=== Anjou-Touraine and Blésois faluns ===
In Anjou, in Touraine and in Blésois, those faluns are known through deposits in:

- Chalonnes-sur-Loire;
- Chazé-Henry;
- Doué-la-Fontaine;
- Louresse-Rochemenier;
- Noëllet;
- Noyant;
- Saint-Laurent-de-Lin;
- Savigné-sur-Lathan;
- Channay-sur-Lathan;
- Pontlevoy.

=== Poitou faluns ===
In Poitou, those faluns are known through deposits in:

- Mirebeau.

== Paleobiodiversity ==
The Faluns Sea hosted a remarkable palaeobiodiversity. Most of the species are close to the ones today found in subtropical seas.

- Cartilaginous fish and bony fish: more than 20 species of sharks such as the famous Otodus megalodon, ten species of rays, a chimaera and fifteen species of bony fish.
- Marine mammals: a few skeletal remains of seals belonging to the species Phocanella couffoni, many bones of the extinct dugong Metaxytherium medium, cetaceans such as the small whale Pelocetus mirabilis whose holotype is kept in the Muséum d'histoire naturelle d'Angers and ten species of dolphins.
- Molluscs: many species of gastropods, bivalves, scaphopods.
- Echinoderms: ten sea urchin species, few remains of crinoids and asterids.
- Crustaceans: several species of crabs and spider crabs.
- Bryozoa: More than 150 species, some of them showing symbiotic associations with corals.
- Corals: Several species, all solitary.

== Bibliography ==
- Suzanne Durand, Le tertiaire de Bretagne : étude stratigraphique, sédimentologique et tectonique, Collection : Mémoires de la Société géologique et minéralogique de Bretagne; 12, 1960.
- Gantier Flavie, Pouit Daniel & Prôa Miguel. (2019). Les vertébrés des faluns miocènes d'Anjou-Touraine conservés au Muséum d'Angers : quantification, répartition spatiale et gradients de paléobiodiversité. 29. 59–87.
