= Dinan Agglomération =

- Communauté d'agglomération
- Interactive map of Dinan Agglomération
- Coordinates: 48°27′N 02°03′W
- Country: France
- Region: Brittany
- Department: Côtes-d'Armor
- No. of communes: {{{nbcomm}}}
- Established: 2017
- Area: 974.1 km^{2} (376.1 sq mi)
- Population (2020): 102,994
  - Density: 105.7/km^{2} (273.8/sq mi)
- Website: www.dinan-agglomeration.fr

Communauté d'agglomération Dinan Agglomération (Breton: Bodadeg Dinan) is an intercommunal structure, centred on the city of Dinan. It is located in the Côtes-d'Armor department, in the Brittany region, western France. It was created in January 2017. Its seat is in Dinan. Its area is 974.1 km^{2}. Its population was 102,994 in 2020, of which 14,682 in Dinan proper.

== Composition ==
The communauté d'agglomération consists of the following 64 communes:

1. Aucaleuc
2. Beaussais-sur-Mer
3. Bobital
4. Bourseul
5. Broons
6. Brusvily
7. Calorguen
8. Caulnes
9. Les Champs-Géraux
10. La Chapelle-Blanche
11. Corseul
12. Créhen
13. Dinan
14. Évran
15. Fréhel
16. Guenroc
17. Guitté
18. Le Hinglé
19. Landébia
20. La Landec
21. Langrolay-sur-Rance
22. Languédias
23. Languenan
24. Lanvallay
25. Matignon
26. Mégrit
27. Plancoët
28. Pléboulle
29. Plélan-le-Petit
30. Pleslin-Trigavou
31. Pleudihen-sur-Rance
32. Plévenon
33. Plorec-sur-Arguenon
34. Plouasne
35. Plouër-sur-Rance
36. Plumaudan
37. Plumaugat
38. Quévert
39. Le Quiou
40. Ruca
41. Saint-André-des-Eaux
42. Saint-Carné
43. Saint-Cast-le-Guildo
44. Saint-Hélen
45. Saint-Jacut-de-la-Mer
46. Saint-Jouan-de-l'Isle
47. Saint-Judoce
48. Saint-Juvat
49. Saint-Lormel
50. Saint-Maden
51. Saint-Maudez
52. Saint-Méloir-des-Bois
53. Saint-Michel-de-Plélan
54. Saint-Pôtan
55. Saint-Samson-sur-Rance
56. Taden
57. Trébédan
58. Tréfumel
59. Trélivan
60. Trévron
61. Val-d'Arguenon
62. La Vicomté-sur-Rance
63. Vildé-Guingalan
64. Yvignac-la-Tour
