= Arrondissement of Dinan =

Coordinates: 48°27′N 2°03′W

Dinan
- Arrondissement
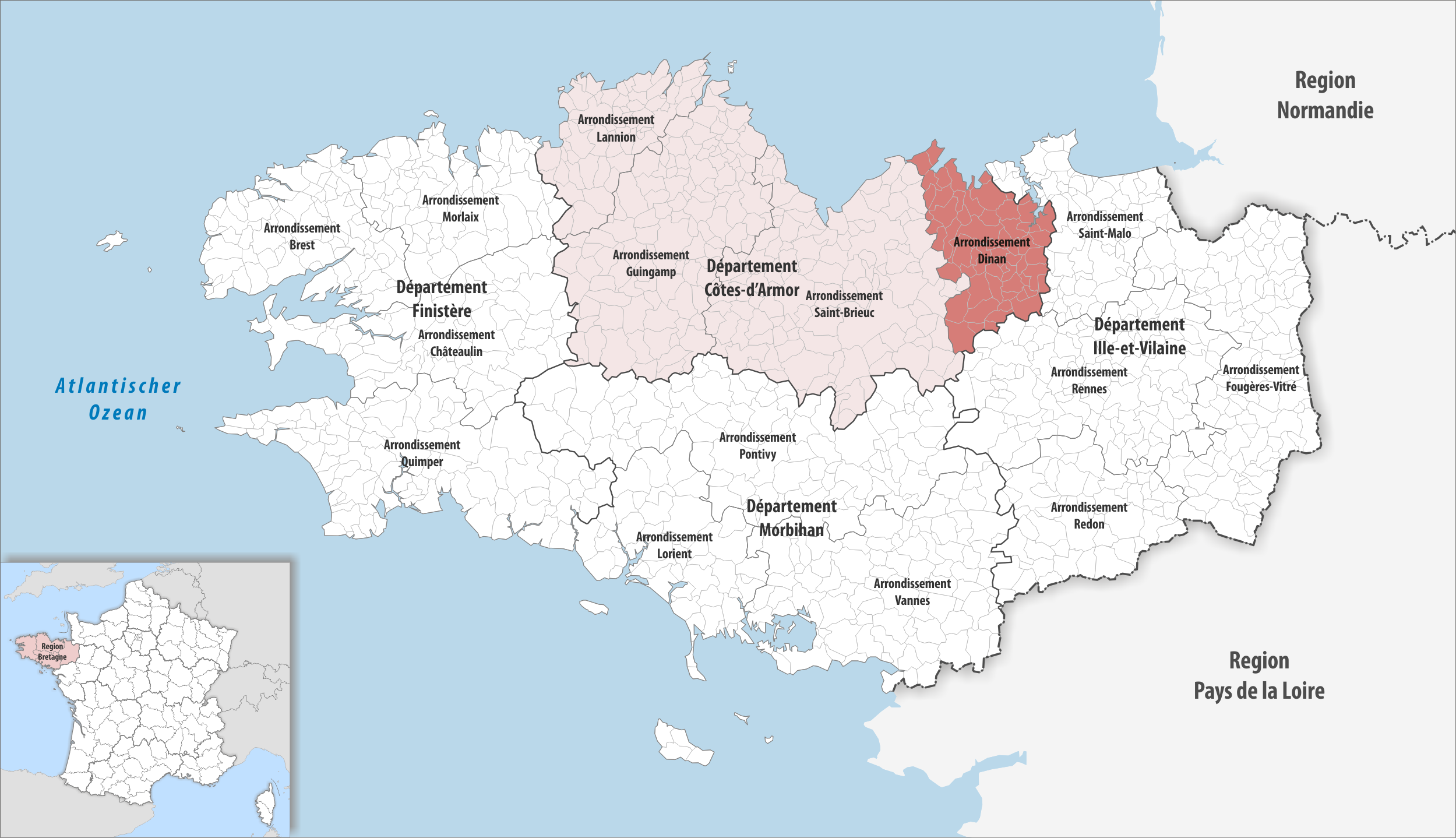
- Location within the region Brittany
- Country: France
- Region: Brittany
- Department: Côtes-d'Armor
- No. of communes: {{{nbcomm}}}
- Area: 984.9 km^{2} (380.3 sq mi)
- Population (2023): 107,310
  - Density: 109.0/km^{2} (282.2/sq mi)
- INSEE code: 221

The arrondissement of Dinan is an arrondissement of France in the Côtes-d'Armor department in the Brittany region. It has 67 communes. Its population is 105,848 (2021), and its area is 984.9 km^{2} (380.3 sq mi).

== Composition ==
The communes of the arrondissement of Dinan, and their INSEE codes, are:

1. Aucaleuc (22003)
2. Beaussais-sur-Mer (22209)
3. Bobital (22008)
4. Bourseul (22014)
5. Broons (22020)
6. Brusvily (22021)
7. Calorguen (22026)
8. Caulnes (22032)
9. Les Champs-Géraux (22035)
10. La Chapelle-Blanche (22036)
11. Corseul (22048)
12. Créhen (22049)
13. Dinan (22050)
14. Évran (22056)
15. Fréhel (22179)
16. Guenroc (22069)
17. Guitté (22071)
18. Le Hinglé (22082)
19. Lancieux (22094)
20. Landébia (22096)
21. La Landec (22097)
22. Langrolay-sur-Rance (22103)
23. Languédias (22104)
24. Languenan (22105)
25. Lanvallay (22118)
26. Matignon (22143)
27. Mégrit (22145)
28. Plancoët (22172)
29. Pléboulle (22174)
30. Plélan-le-Petit (22180)
31. Pleslin-Trigavou (22190)
32. Pleudihen-sur-Rance (22197)
33. Pléven (22200)
34. Plévenon (22201)
35. Plorec-sur-Arguenon (22205)
36. Plouasne (22208)
37. Plouër-sur-Rance (22213)
38. Pluduno (22237)
39. Plumaudan (22239)
40. Plumaugat (22240)
41. Quévert (22259)
42. Le Quiou (22263)
43. Ruca (22268)
44. Saint-André-des-Eaux (22274)
45. Saint-Carné (22280)
46. Saint-Cast-le-Guildo (22282)
47. Saint-Hélen (22299)
48. Saint-Jacut-de-la-Mer (22302)
49. Saint-Jouan-de-l'Isle (22305)
50. Saint-Judoce (22306)
51. Saint-Juvat (22308)
52. Saint-Lormel (22311)
53. Saint-Maden (22312)
54. Saint-Maudez (22315)
55. Saint-Méloir-des-Bois (22317)
56. Saint-Michel-de-Plélan (22318)
57. Saint-Pôtan (22323)
58. Saint-Samson-sur-Rance (22327)
59. Taden (22339)
60. Trébédan (22342)
61. Tréfumel (22352)
62. Trélivan (22364)
63. Tréméreuc (22368)
64. Trévron (22380)
65. La Vicomté-sur-Rance (22385)
66. Vildé-Guingalan (22388)
67. Yvignac-la-Tour (22391)

== History ==
The arrondissement of Dinan was created in 1800. At the January 2017 reorganisation of the arrondissements of Côtes-d'Armor, it lost 25 communes to the arrondissement of Saint-Brieuc.

As a result of the reorganisation of the cantons of France which came into effect in 2015, the borders of the cantons are no longer related to the borders of the arrondissements. The cantons of the arrondissement of Dinan were, as of January 2015:

1. Broons
2. Caulnes
3. Collinée
4. Dinan-Est
5. Dinan-Ouest
6. Évran
7. Jugon-les-Lacs
8. Matignon
9. Merdrignac
10. Plancoët
11. Plélan-le-Petit
12. Ploubalay
