= Plumaugat =

Plumaugat Pluvaelgad
- Commune
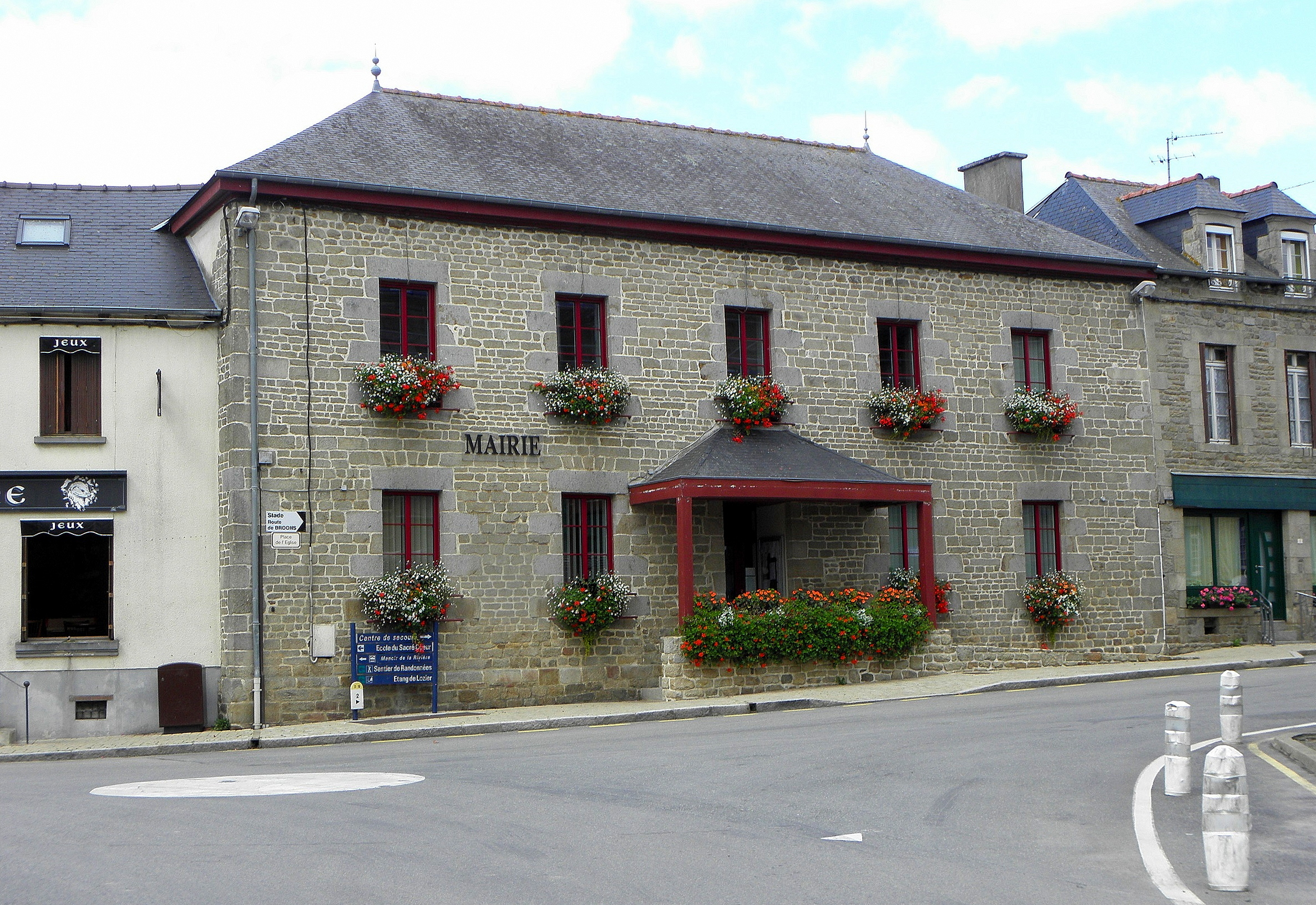
- The town hall in Plumaugat

- Coat of arms
- Location of Plumaugat
- Location within France Location within Brittany
- Coordinates: 48°15′20″N 2°14′16″W
- Country: France
- Region: Brittany
- Department: Côtes-d'Armor
- Arrondissement: Dinan
- Canton: Broons
- Intercommunality: Dinan Agglomération

Government
  - Mayor (2020–2026): Mickaël Chevalier
- Area^{1}: 40.43 km^{2} (15.61 sq mi)
- Highest elevation: 144 m (472 ft)
- Lowest elevation: 63 m (207 ft)
- Population (2023): 1,160
  - Density: 28.7/km^{2} (74.3/sq mi)
- Time zone: UTC+01:00 (CET)
  - Summer (DST): UTC+02:00 (CEST)
- INSEE/Postal code: 22240 /22250
- ^{1} French Land Register data, which excludes lakes, ponds, glaciers > 1 km^{2} (0.386 sq mi or 247 acres) and river estuaries.

Plumaugat (French pronunciation: [plymoɡat]; Breton: Pluvaelgad; Gallo: Ploemaugat) is a commune in the Côtes-d'Armor department of Brittany in northwestern France.

== Population ==
Historical population
Year	Pop.	±% p.a.
1968	1,518	—
1975	1,357	−1.59%
1982	1,229	−1.41%
1990	1,126	−1.09%
1999	1,004	−1.27%
2007	1,026	+0.27%
2012	1,165	+2.57%
2017	1,084	−1.43%
2023	1,160	+1.14%
Source: INSEE

Inhabitants of Plumaugat are called plumaugatais in French.

== See also ==
- Communes of the Côtes-d'Armor department
