= Languédias =

Languédias Langadiarn
- Commune
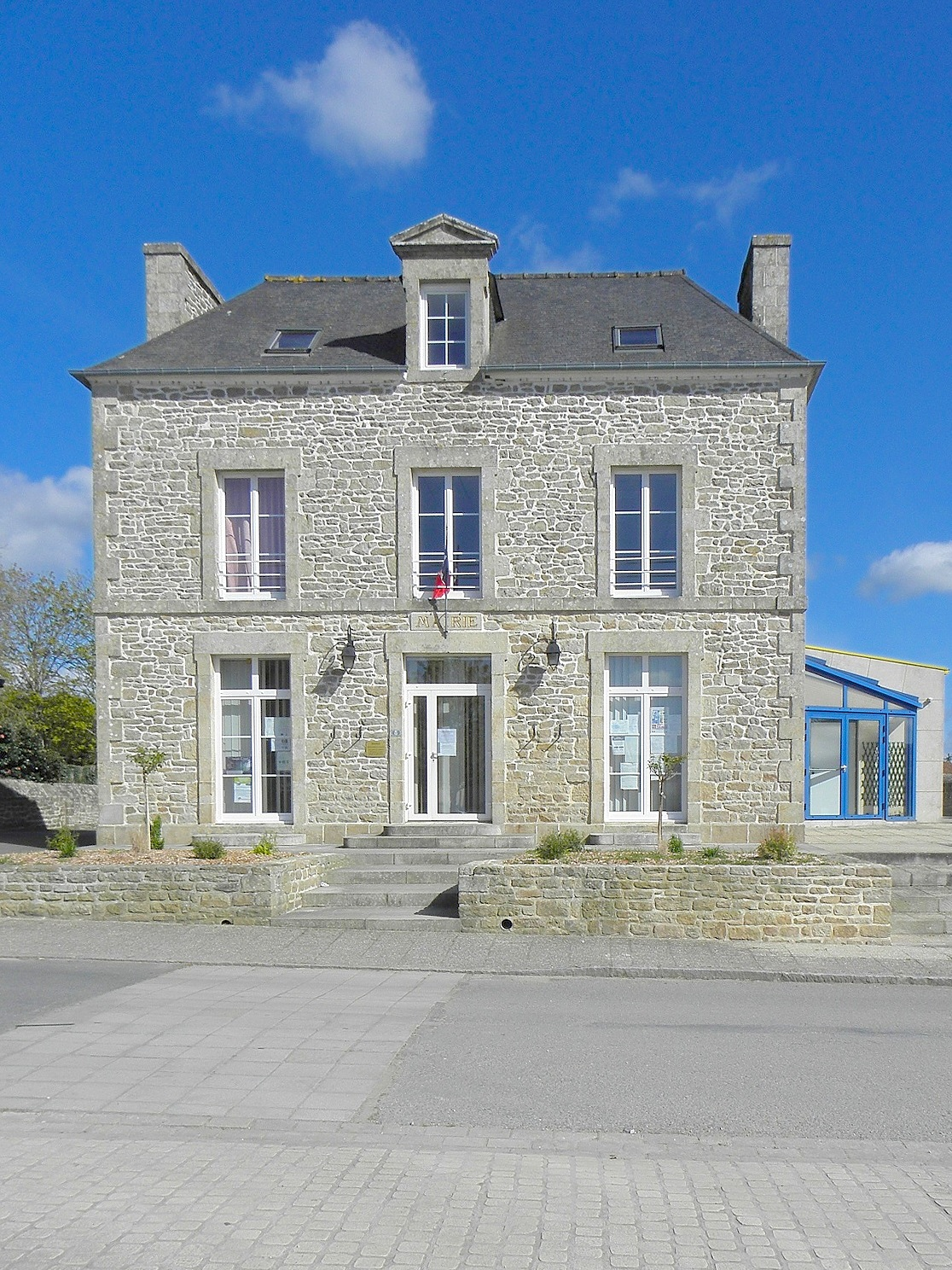
- The town hall in Languédias

- Coat of arms
- Location of Languédias
- Location within France Location within Brittany
- Coordinates: 48°23′20″N 2°12′42″W
- Country: France
- Region: Brittany
- Department: Côtes-d'Armor
- Arrondissement: Dinan
- Canton: Plancoët
- Intercommunality: Dinan Agglomération

Government
  - Mayor (2020–2026): Jérémy Dauphin
- Area^{1}: 8.61 km^{2} (3.32 sq mi)
- Highest elevation: 115 m (377 ft)
- Lowest elevation: 73 m (240 ft)
- Population (2023): 563
  - Density: 65.4/km^{2} (169/sq mi)
- Time zone: UTC+01:00 (CET)
  - Summer (DST): UTC+02:00 (CEST)
- INSEE/Postal code: 22104 /22980
- ^{1} French Land Register data, which excludes lakes, ponds, glaciers > 1 km^{2} (0.386 sq mi or 247 acres) and river estuaries.

Languédias (French pronunciation: [lɑ̃ɡedja]; Breton: Langadiarn) is a commune in the Côtes-d'Armor department of Brittany in northwestern France.

== Population ==
Historical population
Year	Pop.	±% p.a.
1968	514	—
1975	547	+0.89%
1982	539	−0.21%
1990	464	−1.86%
1999	403	−1.55%
2007	455	+1.53%
2012	465	+0.44%
2017	515	+2.06%
2023	563	+1.50%
Source: INSEE

Inhabitants of Languédias are called languédiaçais in French.

== See also ==
- Communes of the Côtes-d'Armor department
