= Brusvily =

Brusvily Bruzivili
- Commune
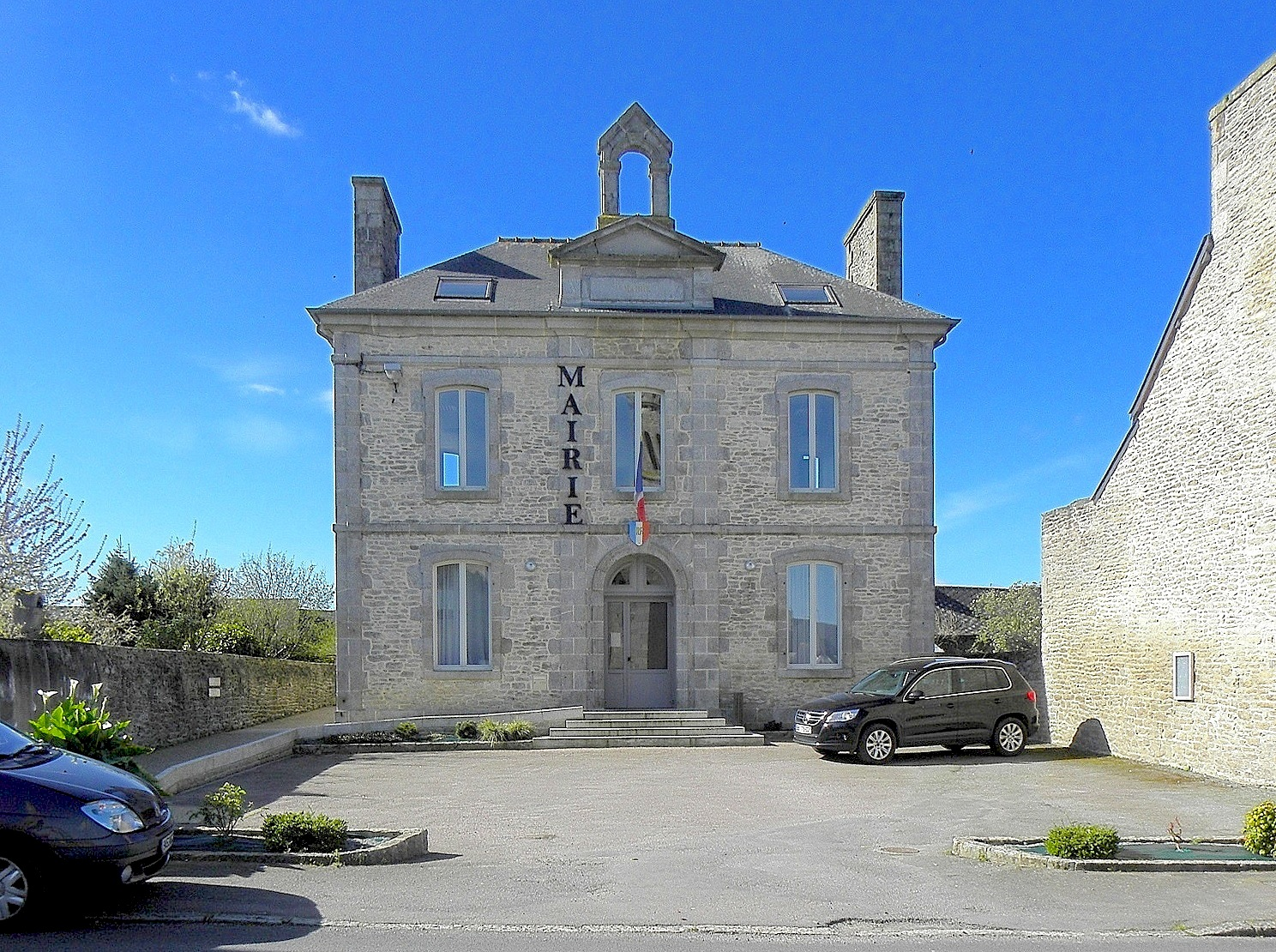
- The town hall of Brusvily

- Coat of arms
- Location of Brusvily
- Location within France Location within Brittany
- Coordinates: 48°23′29″N 2°07′33″W
- Country: France
- Region: Brittany
- Department: Côtes-d'Armor
- Arrondissement: Dinan
- Canton: Lanvallay
- Intercommunality: Dinan Agglomération

Government
  - Mayor (2020–2026): Marie-Claire Douénat
- Area^{1}: 11.83 km^{2} (4.57 sq mi)
- Highest elevation: 120 m (390 ft)
- Lowest elevation: 40 m (130 ft)
- Population (2023): 1,153
  - Density: 97.46/km^{2} (252.4/sq mi)
- Time zone: UTC+01:00 (CET)
  - Summer (DST): UTC+02:00 (CEST)
- INSEE/Postal code: 22021 /22100
- ^{1} French Land Register data, which excludes lakes, ponds, glaciers > 1 km^{2} (0.386 sq mi or 247 acres) and river estuaries.

Brusvily (Breton: Bruzivili, Gallo: Brisstaud) is a commune in the Côtes-d'Armor department of Brittany in northwestern France.

== Population ==
Historical population
Year	Pop.	±% p.a.
1968	658	—
1975	677	+0.41%
1982	711	+0.70%
1990	794	+1.39%
1999	794	+0.00%
2007	977	+2.63%
2012	1,129	+2.93%
2017	1,196	+1.16%
2023	1,153	−0.61%
Source: INSEE

Inhabitants of Brusvily are called Brusviliens in French.

== See also ==
- Communes of the Côtes-d'Armor department
