= Trébédan =

Trébédan Trebêran
- Commune
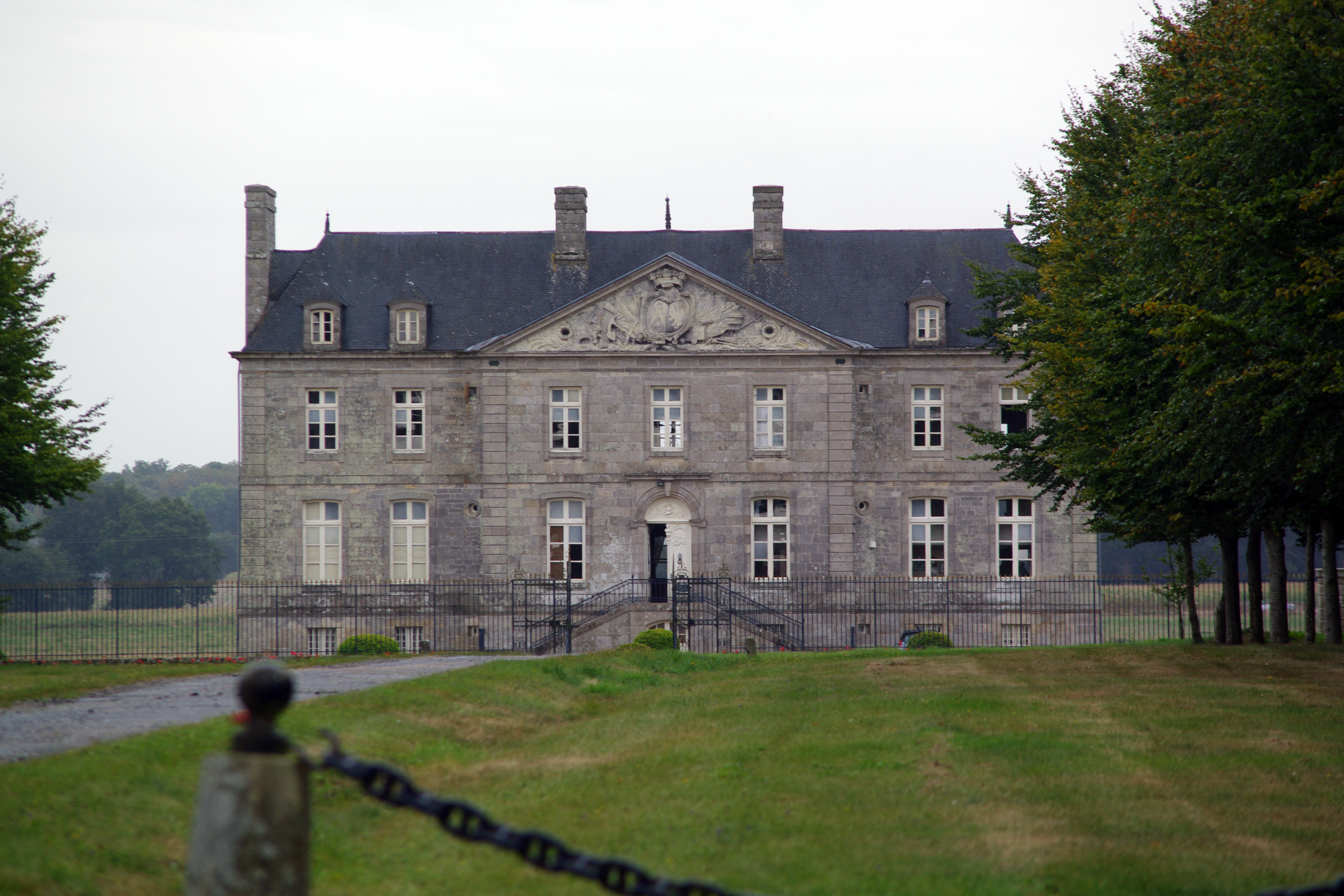
- Chateau of Chalonge

- Coat of arms
- Location of Trébédan
- Location within France Location within Brittany
- Coordinates: 48°24′02″N 2°10′12″W
- Country: France
- Region: Brittany
- Department: Côtes-d'Armor
- Arrondissement: Dinan
- Canton: Plancoët
- Intercommunality: Dinan Agglomération

Government
  - Mayor (2020–2026): Didier Ibagne
- Area^{1}: 10.97 km^{2} (4.24 sq mi)
- Highest elevation: 115 m (377 ft)
- Lowest elevation: 84 m (276 ft)
- Population (2023): 441
  - Density: 40.2/km^{2} (104/sq mi)
- Time zone: UTC+01:00 (CET)
  - Summer (DST): UTC+02:00 (CEST)
- INSEE/Postal code: 22342 /22980
- ^{1} French Land Register data, which excludes lakes, ponds, glaciers > 1 km^{2} (0.386 sq mi or 247 acres) and river estuaries.

Trébédan (French pronunciation: [tʁebedɑ̃]; Breton: Trebêran) is a commune in the Côtes-d'Armor department of Brittany in northwestern France.

== Population ==
Historical population
Year	Pop.	±% p.a.
1968	365	—
1975	341	−0.97%
1982	431	+3.40%
1990	391	−1.21%
1999	384	−0.20%
2007	377	−0.23%
2012	407	+1.54%
2017	428	+1.01%
2023	441	+0.50%
Source: INSEE

Inhabitants of Trébédan are called trébédannais in French.

== See also ==
- Communes of the Côtes-d'Armor department
