= Guenroc =

Guenroc Gwenroc'h
- Commune
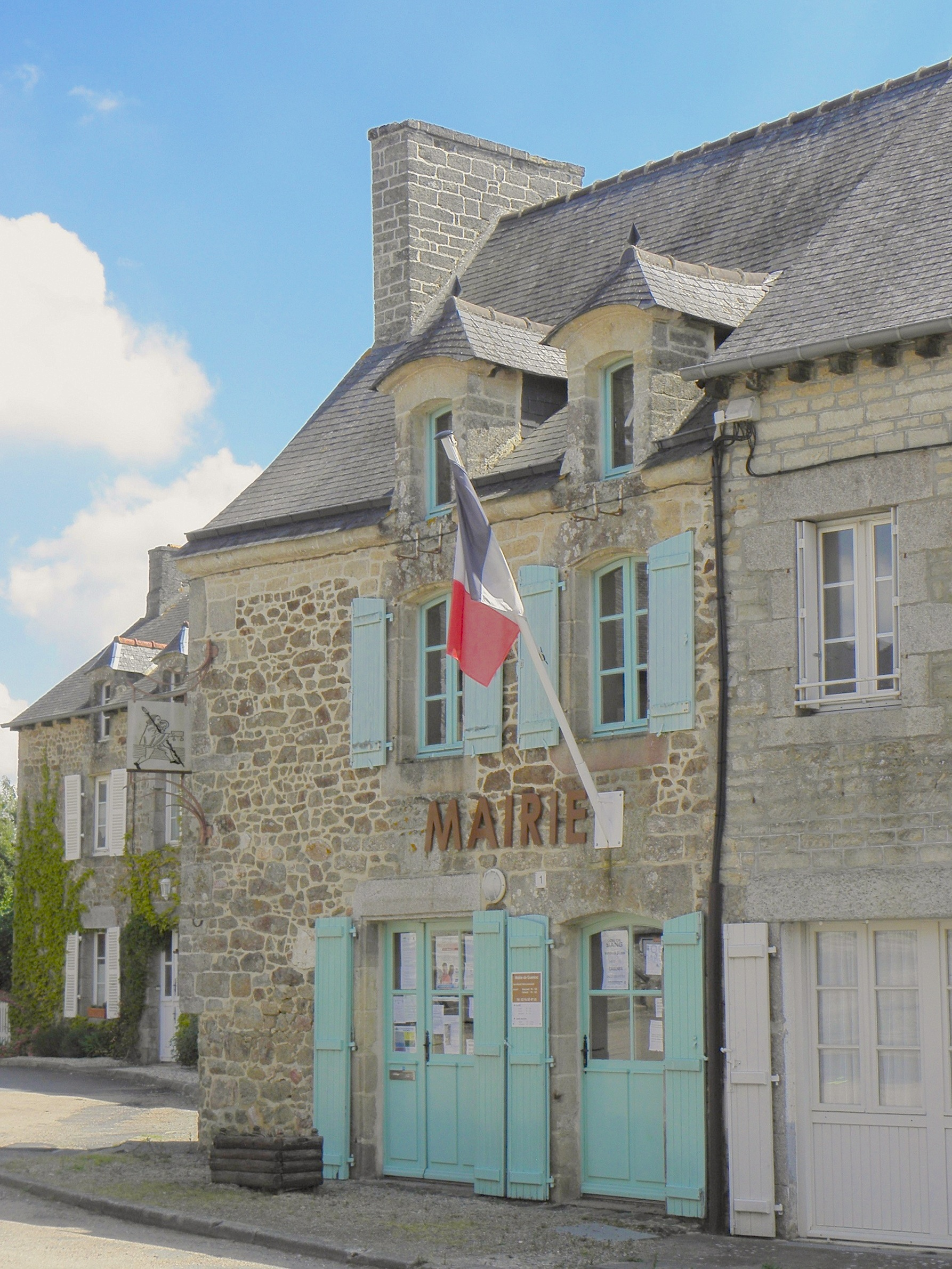
- The town hall of Guenroc

- Coat of arms
- Location of Guenroc
- Location within France Location within Brittany
- Coordinates: 48°19′05″N 2°04′26″W
- Country: France
- Region: Brittany
- Department: Côtes-d'Armor
- Arrondissement: Dinan
- Canton: Broons
- Intercommunality: Dinan Agglomération

Government
  - Mayor (2020–2026): Roger Costard
- Area^{1}: 7.39 km^{2} (2.85 sq mi)
- Highest elevation: 102 m (335 ft)
- Lowest elevation: 23 m (75 ft)
- Population (2023): 215
  - Density: 29.1/km^{2} (75.4/sq mi)
- Time zone: UTC+01:00 (CET)
  - Summer (DST): UTC+02:00 (CEST)
- INSEE/Postal code: 22069 /22350
- ^{1} French Land Register data, which excludes lakes, ponds, glaciers > 1 km^{2} (0.386 sq mi or 247 acres) and river estuaries.

Guenroc (French pronunciation: [ɡɛ̃ʁɔk]; Breton: Gwenroc'h; Gallo: Genroc) is a commune in the Côtes-d'Armor department of Brittany in northwestern France.

== Population ==
Historical population
Year	Pop.	±% p.a.
1968	249	—
1975	193	−3.57%
1982	185	−0.60%
1990	176	−0.62%
1999	195	+1.15%
2007	188	−0.46%
2012	214	+2.62%
2017	220	+0.55%
2023	215	−0.38%
Source: INSEE

Inhabitants of Guenroc are called guenrocois in French.

== See also ==
- Communes of the Côtes-d'Armor department
