= Saint-Carné =

Saint-Carné Sant-Karneg
- Commune
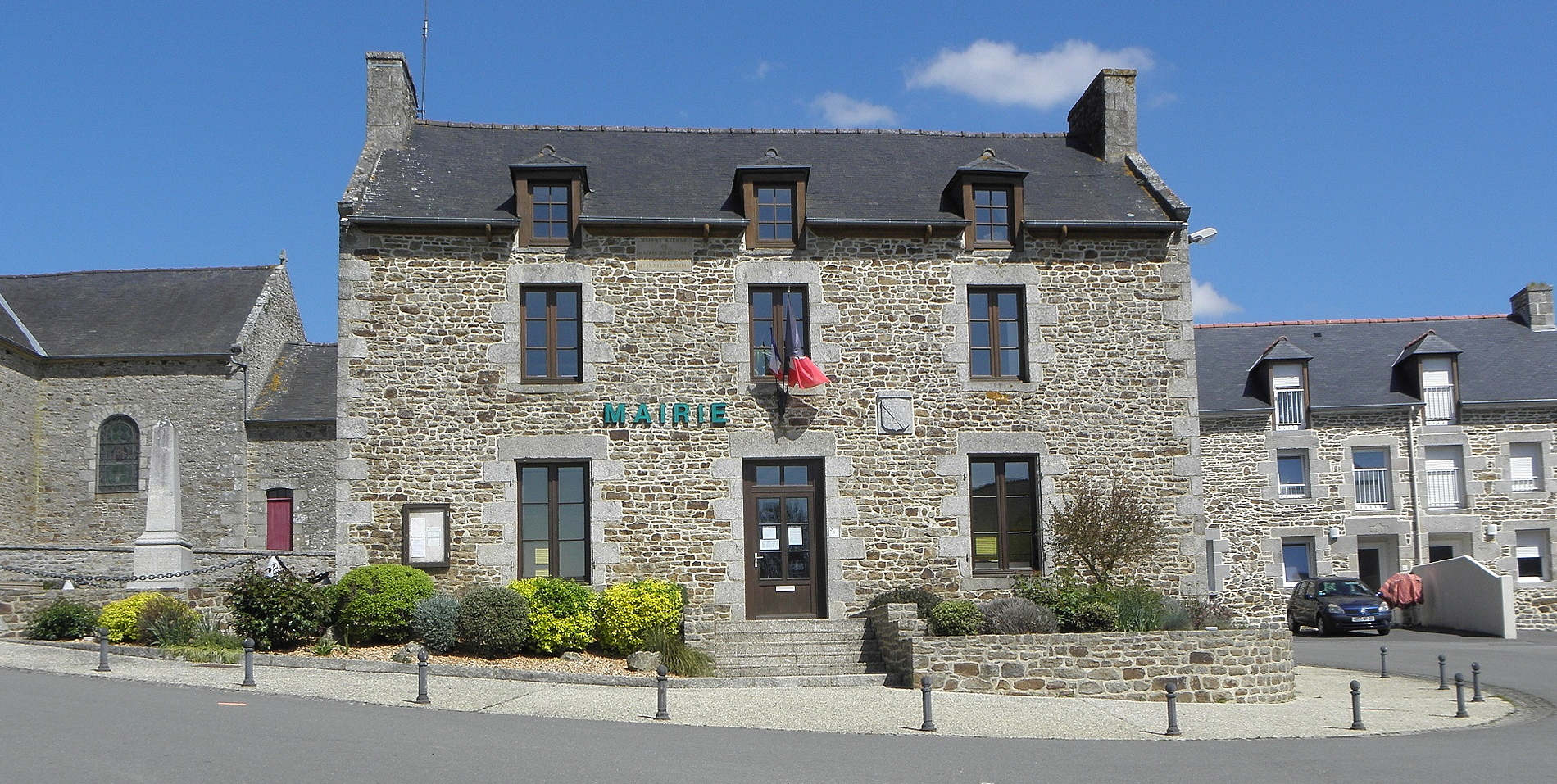
- The town hall in Saint-Carné

- Coat of arms
- Location of Saint-Carné
- Location within France Location within Brittany
- Coordinates: 48°25′00″N 2°03′51″W
- Country: France
- Region: Brittany
- Department: Côtes-d'Armor
- Arrondissement: Dinan
- Canton: Lanvallay
- Intercommunality: Dinan Agglomération

Government
  - Mayor (2020–2026): Ronan Trellu
- Area^{1}: 8.36 km^{2} (3.23 sq mi)
- Highest elevation: 118 m (387 ft)
- Lowest elevation: 7 m (23 ft)
- Population (2023): 1,167
  - Density: 140/km^{2} (362/sq mi)
- Time zone: UTC+01:00 (CET)
  - Summer (DST): UTC+02:00 (CEST)
- INSEE/Postal code: 22280 /22100
- ^{1} French Land Register data, which excludes lakes, ponds, glaciers > 1 km^{2} (0.386 sq mi or 247 acres) and river estuaries.

Saint-Carné (French pronunciation: [sɛ̃ kaʁne]; Breton: Sant-Karneg) is a commune in the Côtes-d'Armor department of Brittany in northwestern France.

== Population ==
Inhabitants of Saint-Carné are called carnéens in French.

== See also ==
- Communes of the Côtes-d'Armor department
