= Calorguen =

Calorguen Kerorgen
- Commune
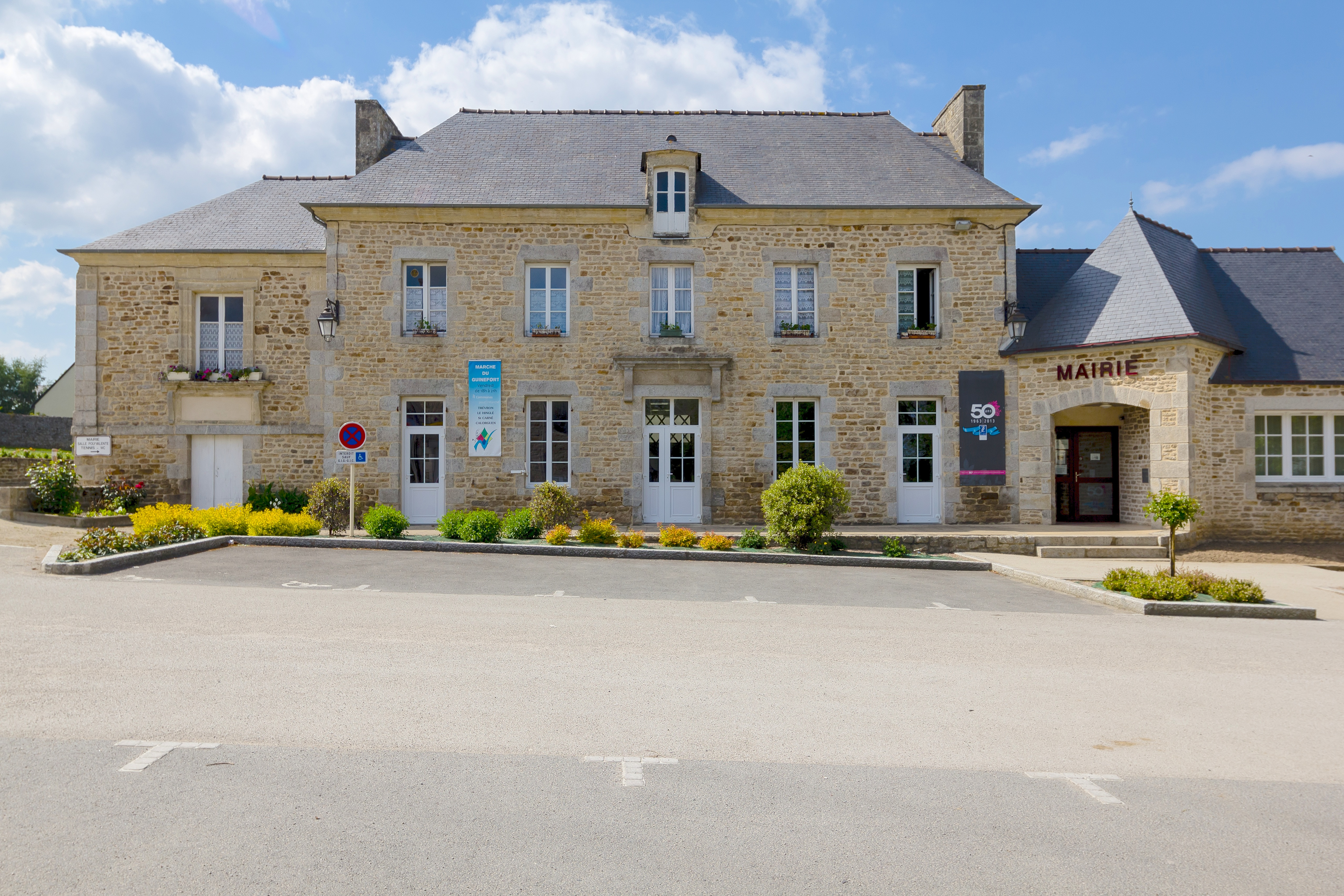
- The town hall of Calorguen

- Coat of arms
- Location of Calorguen
- Location within France Location within Brittany
- Coordinates: 48°24′38″N 2°01′39″W
- Country: France
- Region: Brittany
- Department: Côtes-d'Armor
- Arrondissement: Dinan
- Canton: Lanvallay
- Intercommunality: Dinan Agglomération

Government
  - Mayor (2020–2026): Marcel Robert
- Area^{1}: 8.48 km^{2} (3.27 sq mi)
- Highest elevation: 87 m (285 ft)
- Lowest elevation: 7 m (23 ft)
- Population (2023): 729
  - Density: 86.0/km^{2} (223/sq mi)
- Time zone: UTC+01:00 (CET)
  - Summer (DST): UTC+02:00 (CEST)
- INSEE/Postal code: 22026 /22100
- ^{1} French Land Register data, which excludes lakes, ponds, glaciers > 1 km^{2} (0.386 sq mi or 247 acres) and river estuaries.

Calorguen (French pronunciation: [kalɔʁɡɛ̃]; Breton: Kerorgen; Gallo: Calorgen) is a commune in the Côtes-d'Armor department of Brittany in northwestern France.

== Population ==
Historical population
Year	Pop.	±% p.a.
1968	506	—
1975	450	−1.66%
1982	497	+1.43%
1990	508	+0.27%
1999	523	+0.32%
2007	632	+2.39%
2012	687	+1.68%
2017	728	+1.17%
2023	729	+0.02%
Source: INSEE

Inhabitants of Calorguen are called in French Calorguennais.

== See also ==
- Communes of the Côtes-d'Armor department
