= Bobital =

Bobital Bowidel
- Commune
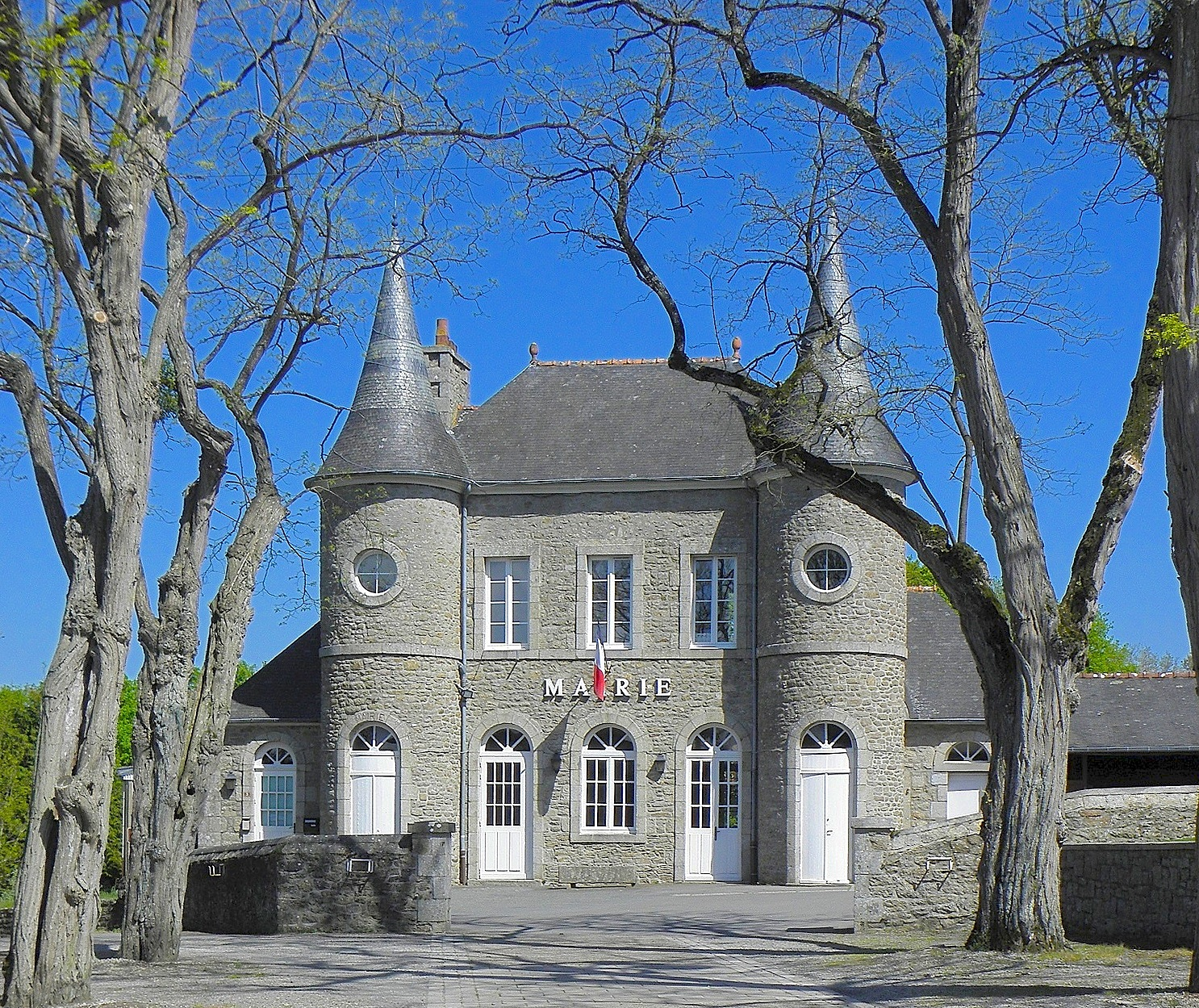
- The town hall of Bobital

- Coat of arms
- Location of Bobital
- Location within France Location within Brittany
- Coordinates: 48°24′51″N 2°06′07″W
- Country: France
- Region: Brittany
- Department: Côtes-d'Armor
- Arrondissement: Dinan
- Canton: Lanvallay
- Intercommunality: Dinan Agglomération

Government
  - Mayor (2023–2026): Gaëtan Accoh
- Area^{1}: 4.99 km^{2} (1.93 sq mi)
- Highest elevation: 111 m (364 ft)
- Lowest elevation: 54 m (177 ft)
- Population (2023): 1,170
  - Density: 234/km^{2} (607/sq mi)
- Time zone: UTC+01:00 (CET)
  - Summer (DST): UTC+02:00 (CEST)
- INSEE/Postal code: 22008 /22100
- ^{1} French Land Register data, which excludes lakes, ponds, glaciers > 1 km^{2} (0.386 sq mi or 247 acres) and river estuaries.

Bobital (French pronunciation: [bɔbital]; Breton: Bowidel; Gallo: Bobitau) is a commune in the Côtes-d'Armor department of Brittany in north-western France.

== Population ==
Historical population
Year	Pop.	±% p.a.
1968	408	—
1975	565	+4.76%
1982	782	+4.75%
1990	934	+2.25%
1999	865	−0.85%
2007	980	+1.57%
2012	1,060	+1.58%
2017	1,100	+0.74%
2023	1,170	+1.03%
Source: INSEE

Inhabitants of Bobital are called Bobitalais in French.

== See also ==
- Communes of the Côtes-d'Armor department
