= Saint-Judoce =

Saint-Judoce Sant-Yuzeg
- Commune
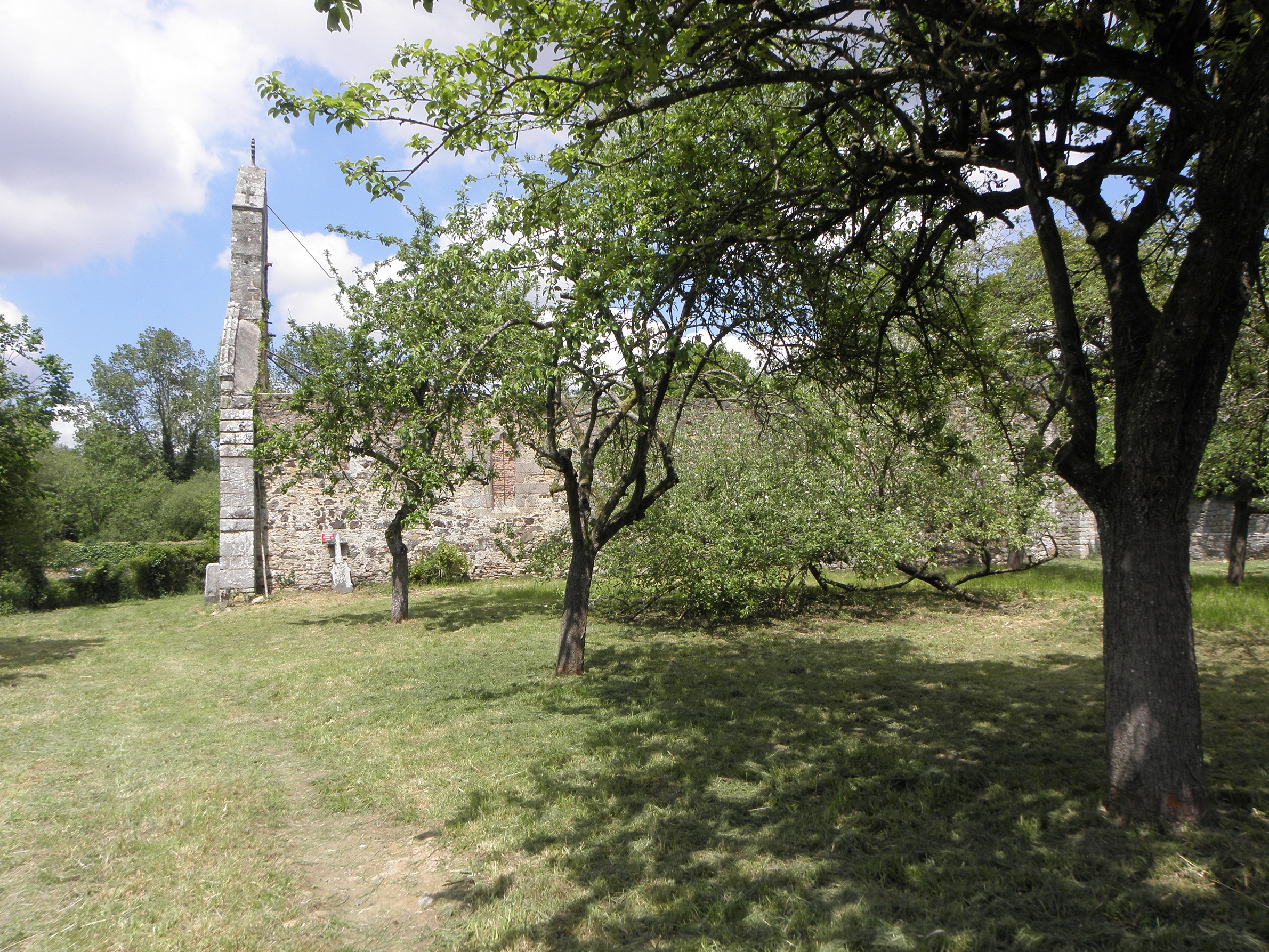
- The old church of Saint-Judoce
- Location of Saint-Judoce
- Location within France Location within Brittany
- Coordinates: 48°21′51″N 1°57′11″W
- Country: France
- Region: Brittany
- Department: Côtes-d'Armor
- Arrondissement: Dinan
- Canton: Lanvallay
- Intercommunality: Dinan Agglomération

Government
  - Mayor (2020–2026): Martial Fairier
- Area^{1}: 10.19 km^{2} (3.93 sq mi)
- Highest elevation: 67 m (220 ft)
- Lowest elevation: 11 m (36 ft)
- Population (2023): 594
  - Density: 58.3/km^{2} (151/sq mi)
- Time zone: UTC+01:00 (CET)
  - Summer (DST): UTC+02:00 (CEST)
- INSEE/Postal code: 22306 /22630
- ^{1} French Land Register data, which excludes lakes, ponds, glaciers > 1 km^{2} (0.386 sq mi or 247 acres) and river estuaries.

Saint-Judoce (French pronunciation: [sɛ̃ ʒydɔs]; Breton: Sant-Yuzeg) is a commune in the Côtes-d'Armor département of Brittany in northwestern France.

== Population ==
Historical population
Year	Pop.	±% p.a.
1968	495	—
1975	430	−1.99%
1982	420	−0.34%
1990	422	+0.06%
1999	443	+0.54%
2007	505	+1.65%
2012	570	+2.45%
2017	565	−0.18%
2023	594	+0.84%
Source: INSEE

Inhabitants of Saint-Judoce are called judocéens in French.

== See also ==
- Communes of the Côtes-d'Armor department
