= Trélivan =

Trélivan Trelivan
- Commune
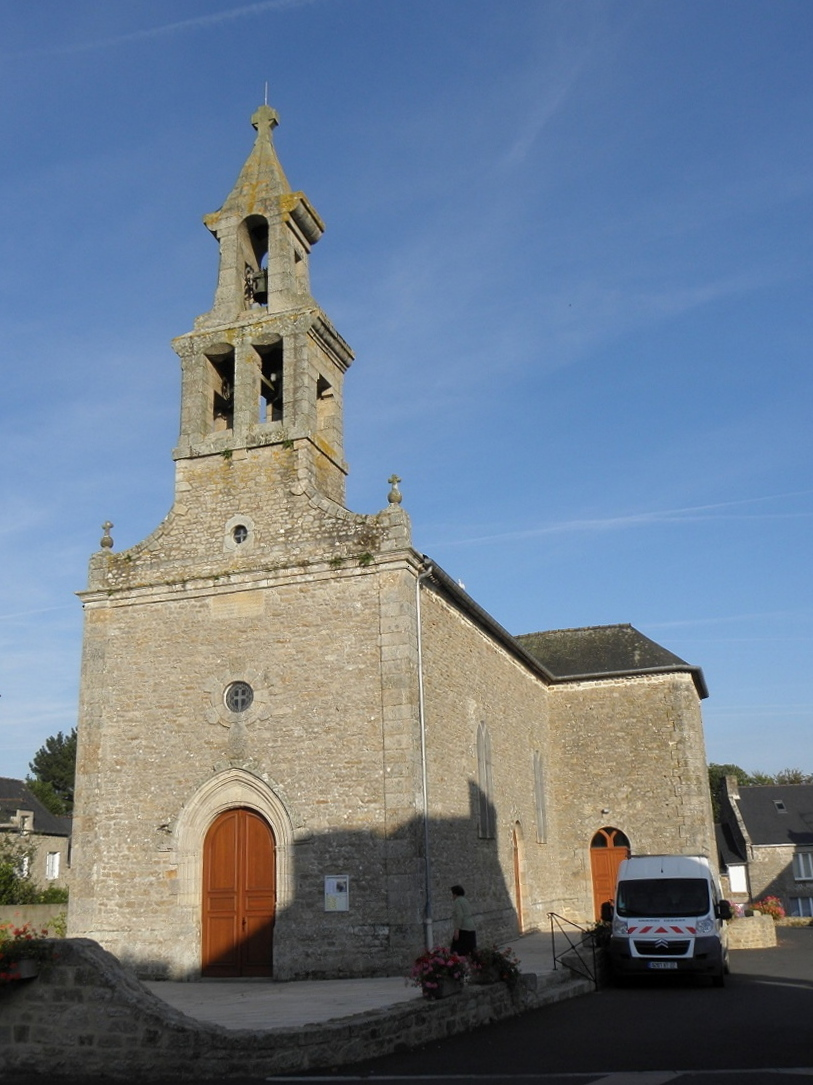
- The church of Saint-Magloire, in Trélivan

- Coat of arms
- Location of Trélivan
- Location within France Location within Brittany
- Coordinates: 48°26′02″N 2°06′59″W
- Country: France
- Region: Brittany
- Department: Côtes-d'Armor
- Arrondissement: Dinan
- Canton: Dinan
- Intercommunality: Dinan Agglomération

Government
  - Mayor (2020–2026): Suzanne Lebreton
- Area^{1}: 11.10 km^{2} (4.29 sq mi)
- Highest elevation: 132 m (433 ft)
- Lowest elevation: 66 m (217 ft)
- Population (2023): 2,865
  - Density: 258.1/km^{2} (668.5/sq mi)
- Time zone: UTC+01:00 (CET)
  - Summer (DST): UTC+02:00 (CEST)
- INSEE/Postal code: 22364 /22100
- ^{1} French Land Register data, which excludes lakes, ponds, glaciers > 1 km^{2} (0.386 sq mi or 247 acres) and river estuaries.

Trélivan (French pronunciation: [tʁelivɑ̃]; Breton: Trelivan) is a commune in the Côtes-d'Armor department of Brittany in northwestern France.

== Population ==
Inhabitants of Trélivan are called trélivannais in French.

Historical population
Year	Pop.	±% p.a.
1968	741	—
1975	1,538	+11.00%
1982	2,202	+5.26%
1990	2,289	+0.49%
1999	2,170	−0.59%
2007	2,329	+0.89%
2012	2,515	+1.55%
2017	2,782	+2.04%
2023	2,865	+0.49%
Source: INSEE

== See also ==
- Communes of the Côtes-d'Armor department
