= Saint-Maden =

Saint-Maden Sant-Maden
- Commune
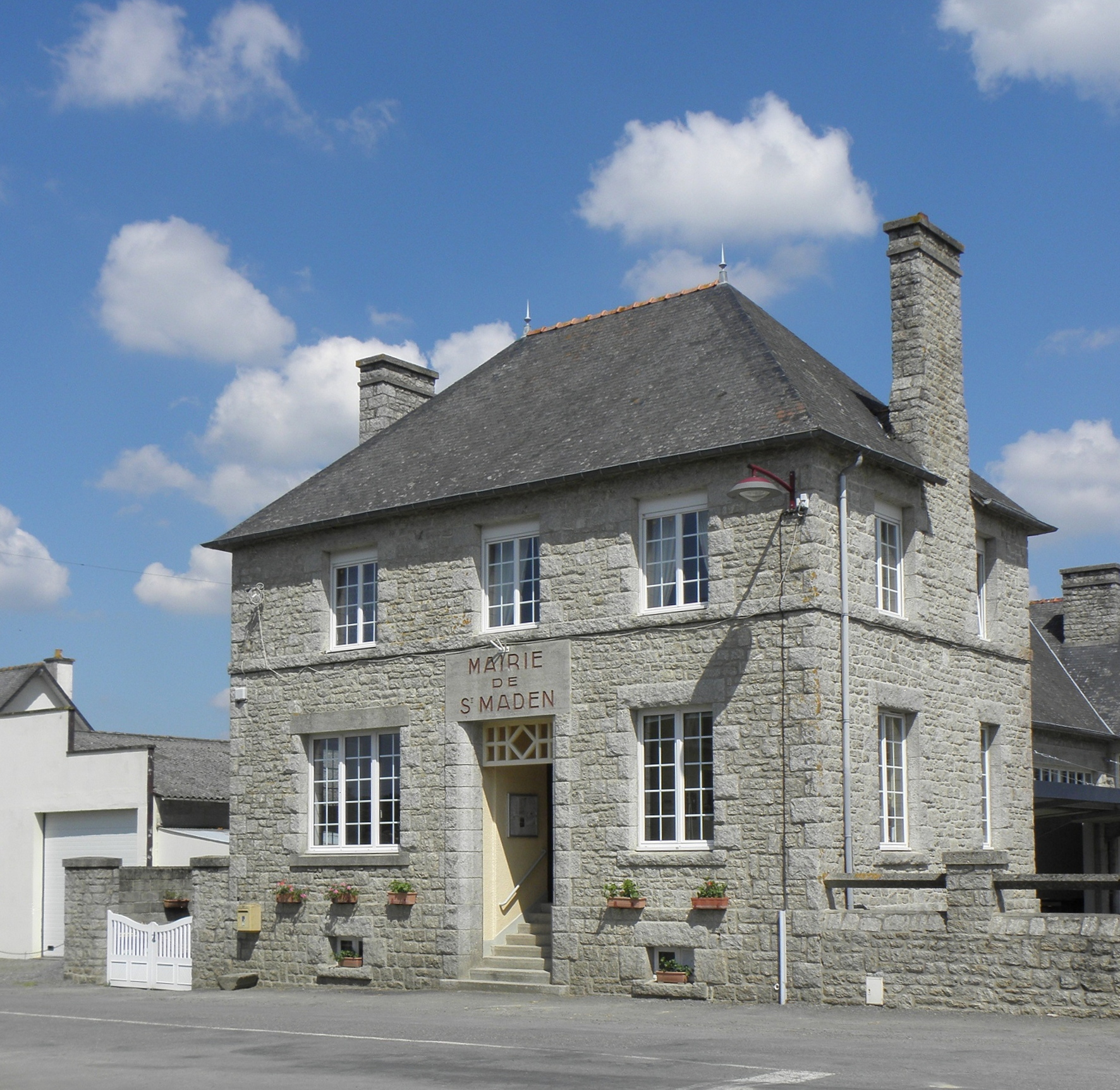
- The town hall of Saint-Maden

- Coat of arms
- Location of Saint-Maden
- Location within France Location within Brittany
- Coordinates: 48°19′53″N 2°04′34″W
- Country: France
- Region: Brittany
- Department: Côtes-d'Armor
- Arrondissement: Dinan
- Canton: Broons
- Intercommunality: Dinan Agglomération

Government
  - Mayor (2020–2026): Jean-Luc Lechevestrier
- Area^{1}: 6.56 km^{2} (2.53 sq mi)
- Highest elevation: 70 m (230 ft)
- Lowest elevation: 17 m (56 ft)
- Population (2023): 218
  - Density: 33.2/km^{2} (86.1/sq mi)
- Time zone: UTC+01:00 (CET)
  - Summer (DST): UTC+02:00 (CEST)
- INSEE/Postal code: 22312 /22350
- ^{1} French Land Register data, which excludes lakes, ponds, glaciers > 1 km^{2} (0.386 sq mi or 247 acres) and river estuaries.

Saint-Maden (French pronunciation: [sɛ̃ madɛ̃]; Breton: Sant-Maden; Gallo: Saent-Maden) is a commune in the Côtes-d'Armor department of Brittany in northwestern France.

== Population ==
Historical population
Year	Pop.	±% p.a.
1968	282	—
1975	272	−0.51%
1982	283	+0.57%
1990	246	−1.74%
1999	206	−1.95%
2007	208	+0.12%
2012	201	−0.68%
2017	231	+2.82%
2023	218	−0.96%
Source: INSEE

Inhabitants of Saint-Maden are called madennais in French.

== See also ==
- Communes of the Côtes-d'Armor department
