= Mégrit =

Mégrit Megrid
- Commune
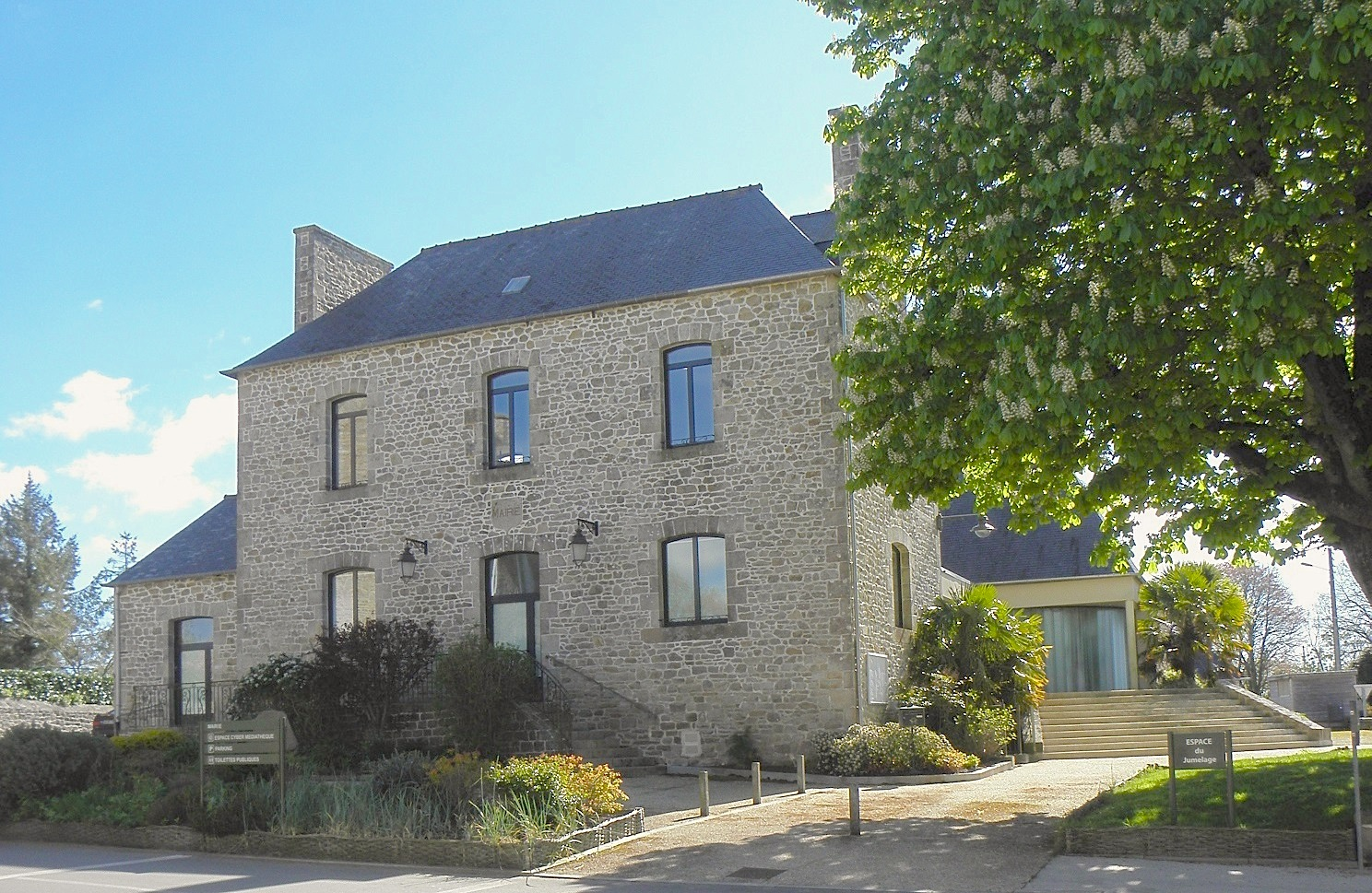
- The town hall of Mégrit

- Coat of arms
- Location of Mégrit
- Location within France Location within Brittany
- Coordinates: 48°22′32″N 2°14′50″W
- Country: France
- Region: Brittany
- Department: Côtes-d'Armor
- Arrondissement: Dinan
- Canton: Broons
- Intercommunality: Dinan Agglomération

Government
  - Mayor (2020–2026): Marie-Jeanne Després
- Area^{1}: 20.63 km^{2} (7.97 sq mi)
- Highest elevation: 130 m (430 ft)
- Lowest elevation: 29 m (95 ft)
- Population (2023): 812
  - Density: 39.4/km^{2} (102/sq mi)
- Time zone: UTC+01:00 (CET)
  - Summer (DST): UTC+02:00 (CEST)
- INSEE/Postal code: 22145 /22270
- ^{1} French Land Register data, which excludes lakes, ponds, glaciers > 1 km^{2} (0.386 sq mi or 247 acres) and river estuaries.

Mégrit (Breton: Megrid) is a commune in the Côtes-d'Armor department of Brittany in northwestern France.

== Population ==
Historical population
Year	Pop.	±% p.a.
1968	776	—
1975	721	−1.04%
1982	702	−0.38%
1990	654	−0.88%
1999	645	−0.15%
2007	690	+0.85%
2012	786	+2.64%
2017	818	+0.80%
2023	812	−0.12%
Source: INSEE

Inhabitants of Mégrit are called mégritiens in French.

== See also ==
- Communes of the Côtes-d'Armor department
