= Saint-Hélen =

Saint-Hélen Sant-Haelen
- Commune
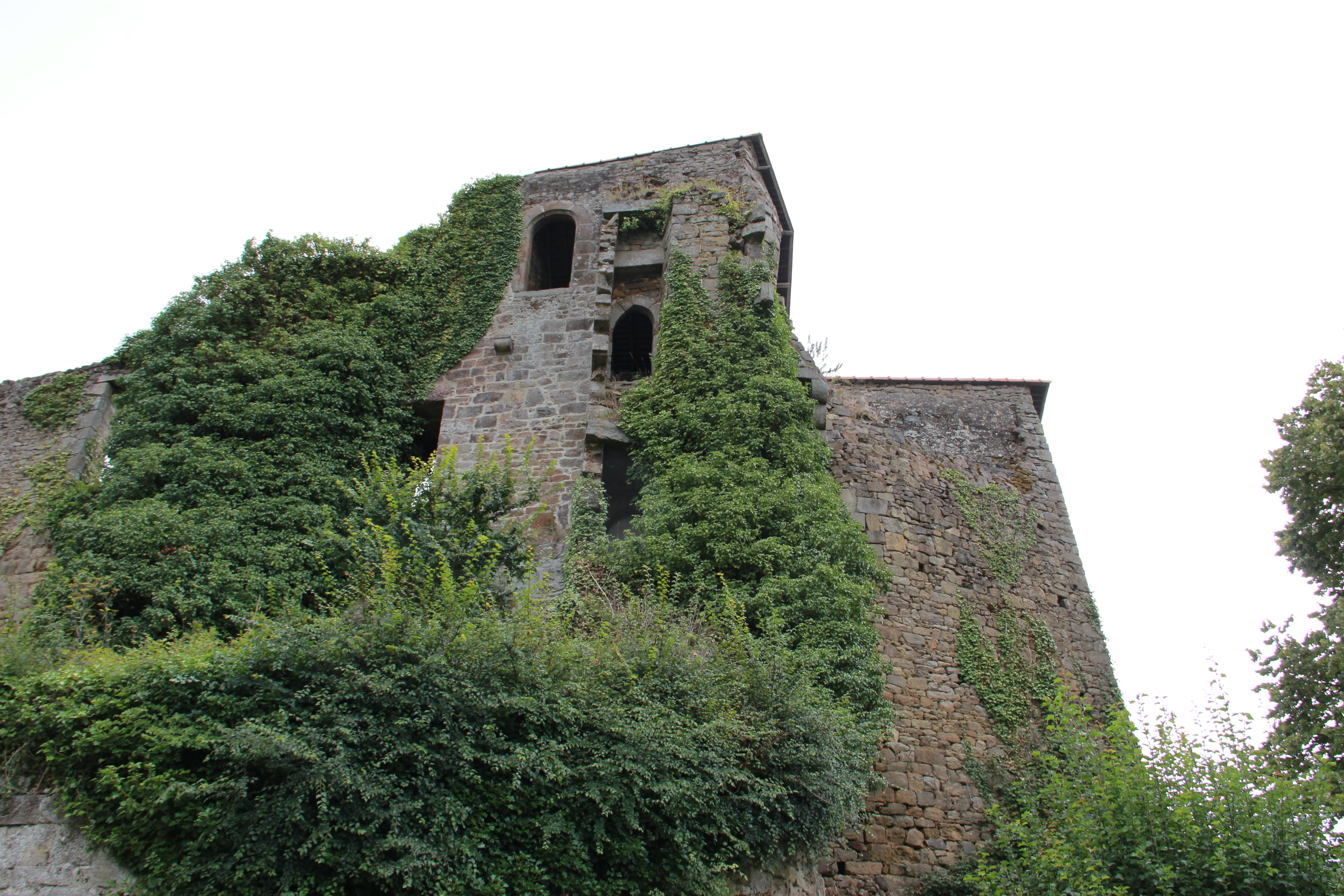
- Ruins of the chateau of Coëtquen

- Coat of arms
- Location of Saint-Hélen
- Location within France Location within Brittany
- Coordinates: 48°28′19″N 1°57′32″W
- Country: France
- Region: Brittany
- Department: Côtes-d'Armor
- Arrondissement: Dinan
- Canton: Lanvallay
- Intercommunality: Dinan Agglomération

Government
  - Mayor (2020–2026): Marie-Christine Pinard
- Area^{1}: 17.02 km^{2} (6.57 sq mi)
- Highest elevation: 87 m (285 ft)
- Lowest elevation: 7 m (23 ft)
- Population (2023): 1,560
  - Density: 91.7/km^{2} (237/sq mi)
- Time zone: UTC+01:00 (CET)
  - Summer (DST): UTC+02:00 (CEST)
- INSEE/Postal code: 22299 /22100
- ^{1} French Land Register data, which excludes lakes, ponds, glaciers > 1 km^{2} (0.386 sq mi or 247 acres) and river estuaries.

Saint-Hélen (French pronunciation: [sɛ̃.t‿elɛ̃]; Breton: Sant-Haelen) is a commune in the Côtes-d'Armor département of Brittany in northwestern France.

== Population ==
Inhabitants of Saint-Hélen are called hélennais in French.

== See also ==
- Communes of the Côtes-d'Armor department
