= Le Hinglé =

Le Hinglé An Hengleuz
- Commune
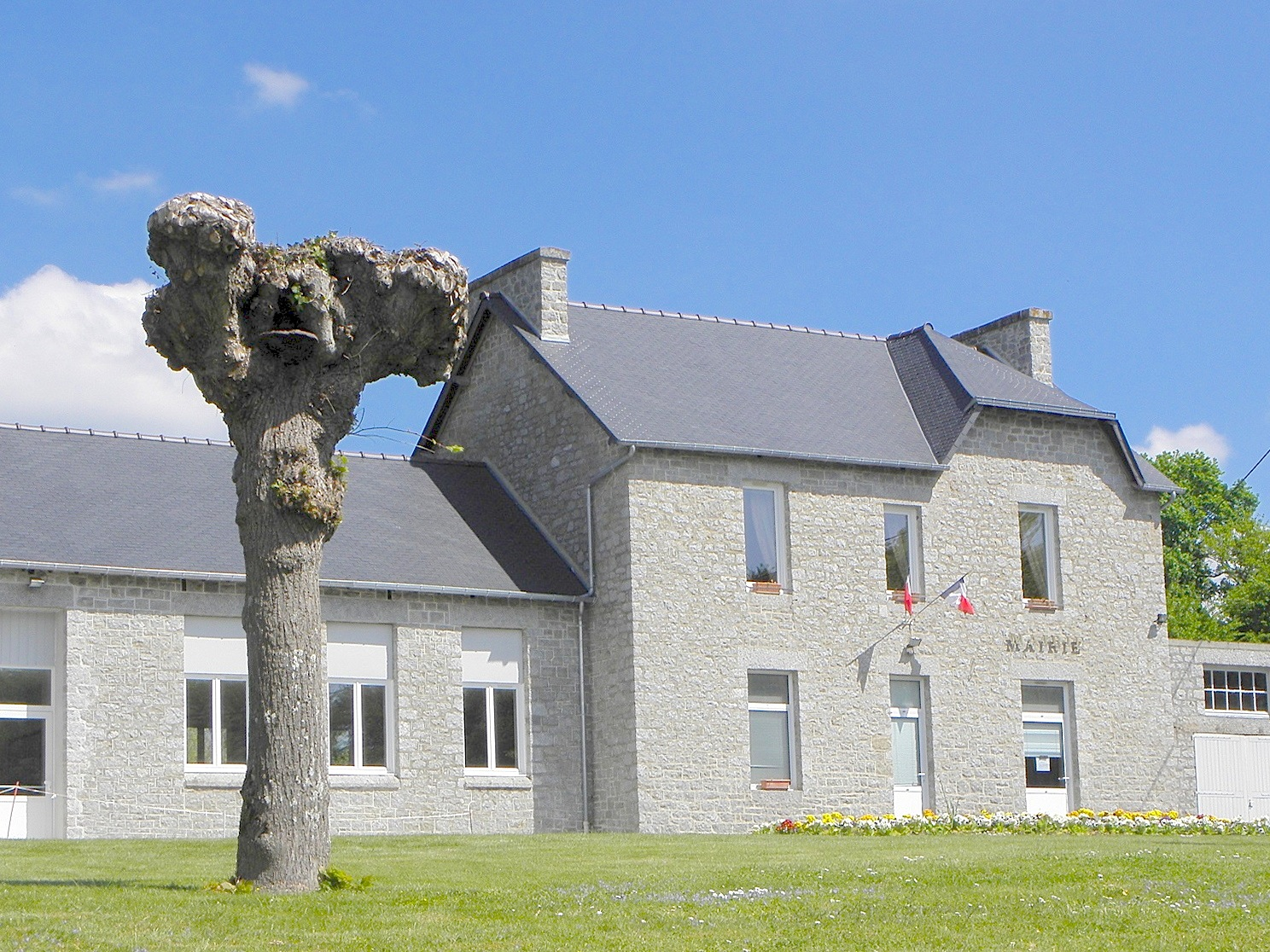
- The town hall of Le Hinglé

- Coat of arms
- Location of Le Hinglé
- Location within France Location within Brittany
- Coordinates: 48°23′37″N 2°04′37″W
- Country: France
- Region: Brittany
- Department: Côtes-d'Armor
- Arrondissement: Dinan
- Canton: Lanvallay
- Intercommunality: Dinan Agglomération

Government
  - Mayor (2020–2026): Gérard Berhault
- Area^{1}: 3.37 km^{2} (1.30 sq mi)
- Highest elevation: 112 m (367 ft)
- Lowest elevation: 33 m (108 ft)
- Population (2023): 927
  - Density: 275/km^{2} (712/sq mi)
- Time zone: UTC+01:00 (CET)
  - Summer (DST): UTC+02:00 (CEST)
- INSEE/Postal code: 22082 /22100
- ^{1} French Land Register data, which excludes lakes, ponds, glaciers > 1 km^{2} (0.386 sq mi or 247 acres) and river estuaries.

Le Hinglé (French pronunciation: [lə ɛ̃ɡle]; Breton: An Hengleuz) is a commune in the Côtes-d'Armor department of Brittany in northwestern France.

== Population ==
Historical population
Year	Pop.	±% p.a.
1968	562	—
1975	620	+1.41%
1982	656	+0.81%
1990	732	+1.38%
1999	680	−0.82%
2007	855	+2.90%
2012	833	−0.52%
2017	903	+1.63%
2023	927	+0.44%
Source: INSEE

The inhabitants of Le Hinglé are known in French as hingleziens.

== See also ==
- Communes of the Côtes-d'Armor department
