= Canton of Lanvallay =

Coordinates: 48.45°N 2.02°W

The canton of Lanvallay is an administrative division of the Côtes-d'Armor department, northwestern France. It was created at the French canton reorganisation which came into effect in March 2015. Its seat is in Lanvallay.

It consists of the following communes:

1. Bobital
2. Brusvily
3. Calorguen
4. Les Champs-Géraux
5. Évran
6. Le Hinglé
7. Lanvallay
8. Pleudihen-sur-Rance
9. Plouasne
10. Le Quiou
11. Saint-André-des-Eaux
12. Saint-Carné
13. Saint-Hélen
14. Saint-Judoce
15. Saint-Juvat
16. Tréfumel
17. Trévron
