= Trévron =

Trévron Treveron
- Commune
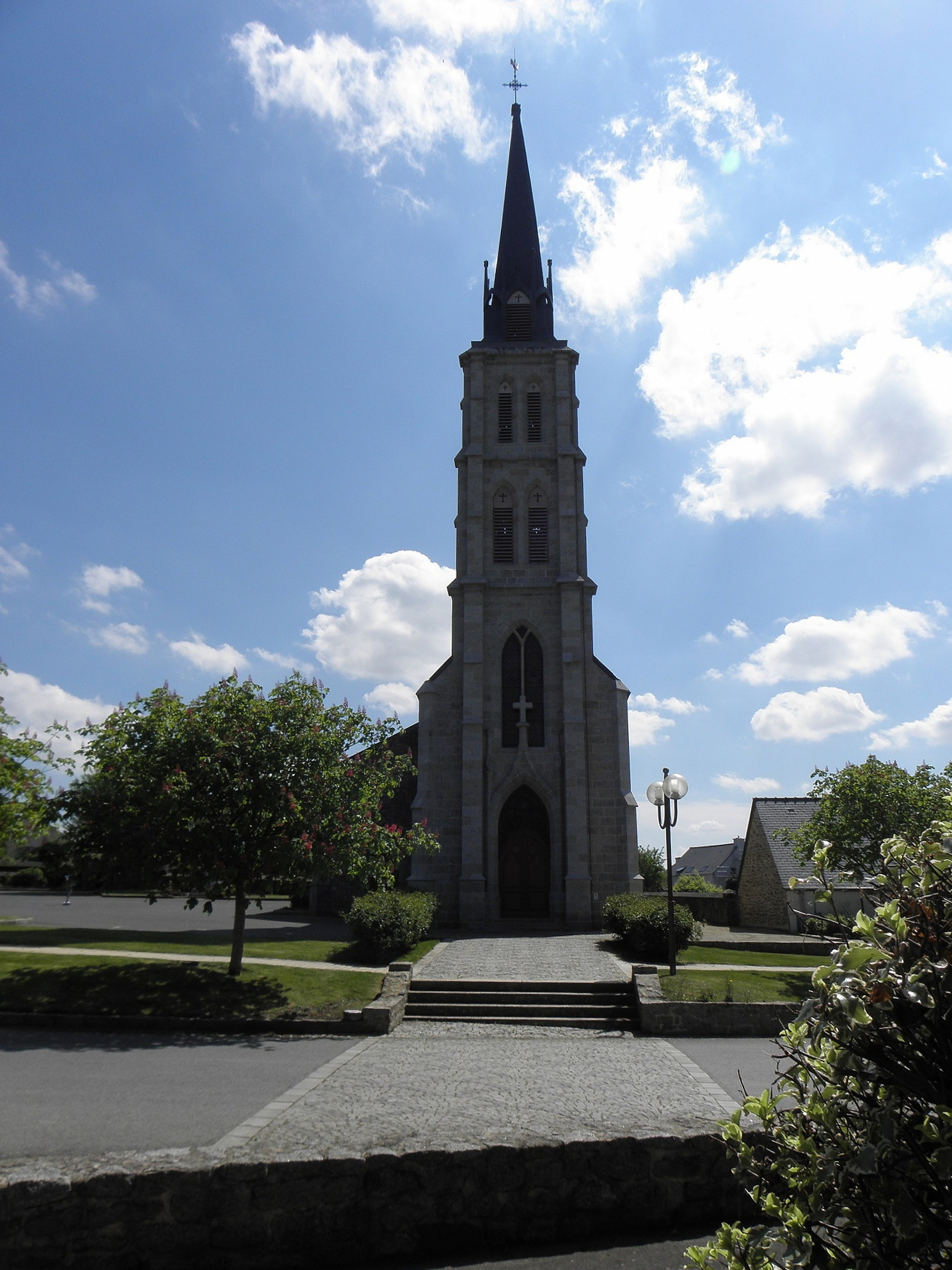
- The church of Saint-Laurent, in Trévron

- Coat of arms
- Location of Trévron
- Location within France Location within Brittany
- Coordinates: 48°23′31″N 2°03′41″W
- Country: France
- Region: Brittany
- Department: Côtes-d'Armor
- Arrondissement: Dinan
- Canton: Lanvallay
- Intercommunality: Dinan Agglomération

Government
  - Mayor (2020–2026): Cécile Metaye-Brunet
- Area^{1}: 9.60 km^{2} (3.71 sq mi)
- Highest elevation: 112 m (367 ft)
- Lowest elevation: 25 m (82 ft)
- Population (2023): 682
  - Density: 71.0/km^{2} (184/sq mi)
- Time zone: UTC+01:00 (CET)
  - Summer (DST): UTC+02:00 (CEST)
- INSEE/Postal code: 22380 /22100
- ^{1} French Land Register data, which excludes lakes, ponds, glaciers > 1 km^{2} (0.386 sq mi or 247 acres) and river estuaries.

Trévron (French pronunciation: [tʁevʁɔ̃]; Breton: Treveron; Gallo: Terveron) is a commune in the Côtes-d'Armor department in Brittany in northwestern France.

== Population ==
Historical population
| Year | Pop. | ±% p.a. |
|---|---|---|
| 1968 | 615 | — |
| 1975 | 565 | −1.20% |
| 1982 | 594 | +0.72% |
| 1990 | 679 | +1.69% |
| 1999 | 664 | −0.25% |
| 2007 | 678 | +0.26% |
| 2012 | 713 | +1.01% |
| 2017 | 686 | −0.77% |
| 2023 | 682 | −0.10% |
Source: INSEE

Inhabitants of Trévron are called trévronnais in French.

== See also ==
- Communes of the Côtes-d'Armor department
