= Saint-Jouan-de-l'Isle =

Saint-Jouan-de-l'Isle Sant-Yowan-an-Enez
- Commune
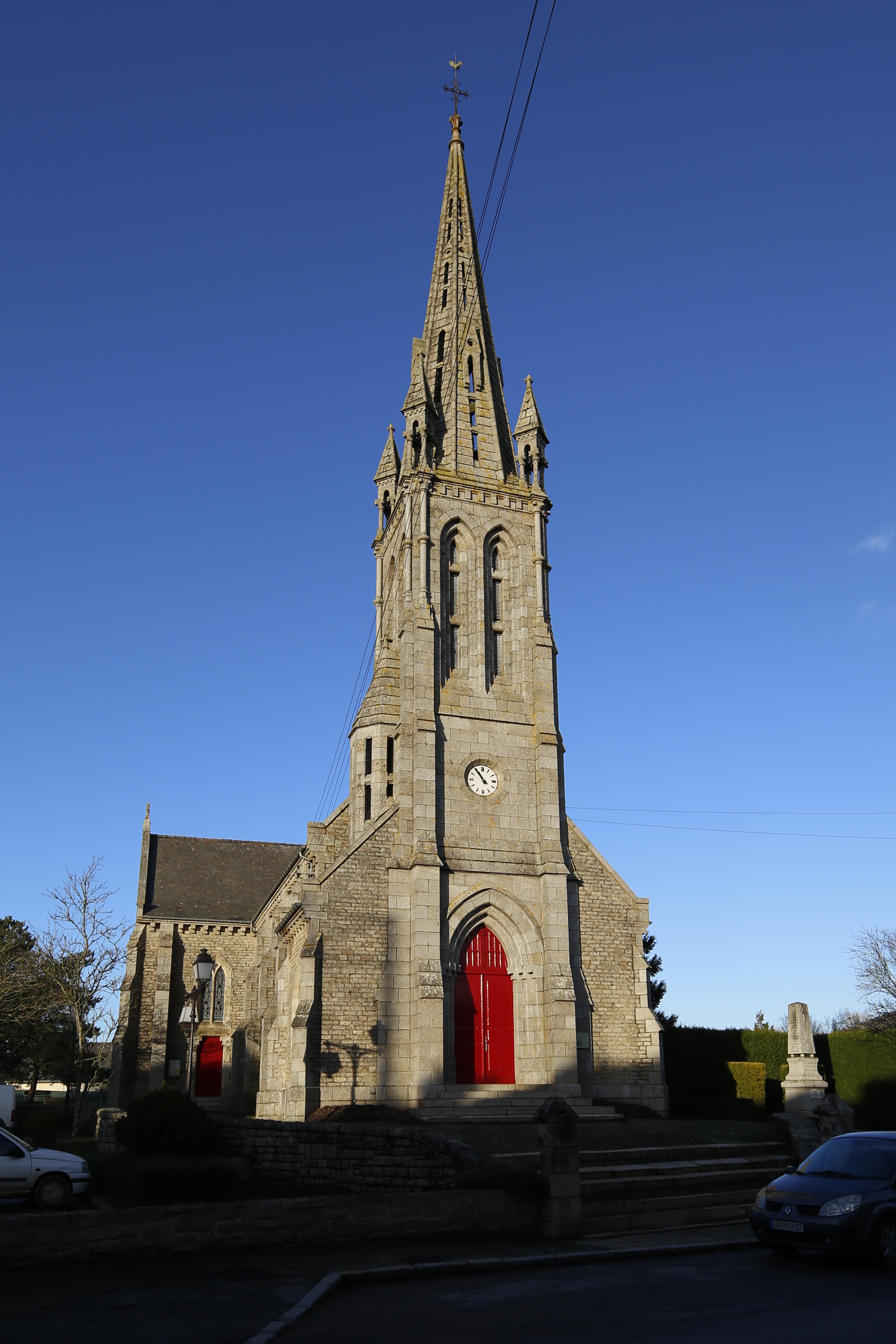
- The church of Saint-Jean-Baptiste, in Saint-Jouan-de-l'Isle

- Coat of arms
- Location of Saint-Jouan-de-l'Isle
- Location within France Location within Brittany
- Coordinates: 48°16′06″N 2°09′28″W
- Country: France
- Region: Brittany
- Department: Côtes-d'Armor
- Arrondissement: Dinan
- Canton: Broons
- Intercommunality: Dinan Agglomération

Government
  - Mayor (2021–2026): Gilles Coupu
- Area^{1}: 8.09 km^{2} (3.12 sq mi)
- Highest elevation: 131 m (430 ft)
- Lowest elevation: 52 m (171 ft)
- Population (2023): 446
  - Density: 55.1/km^{2} (143/sq mi)
- Time zone: UTC+01:00 (CET)
  - Summer (DST): UTC+02:00 (CEST)
- INSEE/Postal code: 22305 /22350
- ^{1} French Land Register data, which excludes lakes, ponds, glaciers > 1 km^{2} (0.386 sq mi or 247 acres) and river estuaries.

Saint-Jouan-de-l'Isle (French pronunciation: [sɛ̃ ʒwɑ̃ də lil]; Breton: Sant-Yowan-an-Enez) is a commune in the Côtes-d'Armor département of Brittany in northwestern France.

== Population ==
Historical population
Year	Pop.	±% p.a.
1968	426	—
1975	415	−0.37%
1982	375	−1.44%
1990	359	−0.54%
1999	345	−0.44%
2007	424	+2.61%
2012	467	+1.95%
2017	496	+1.21%
2023	446	−1.76%
Source: INSEE

Inhabitants of Saint-Jouan-de-l'Isle are called saint-jouannais in French.

== See also ==
- Communes of the Côtes-d'Armor department
