= La Landec =

La Landec Lannandeg
- Commune
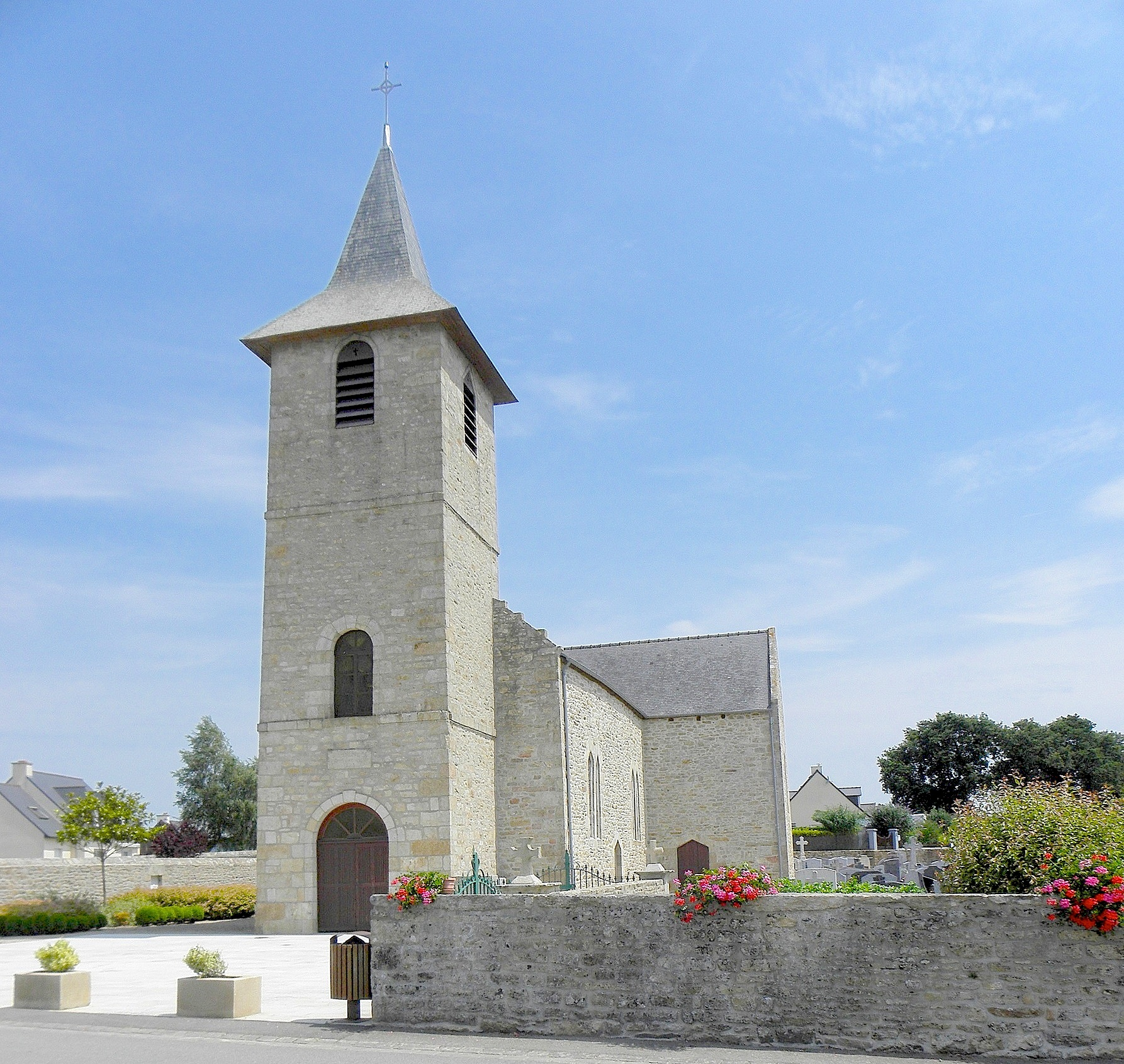
- The church of Saint-Pierre and Sainte-Agnès, in La Landec

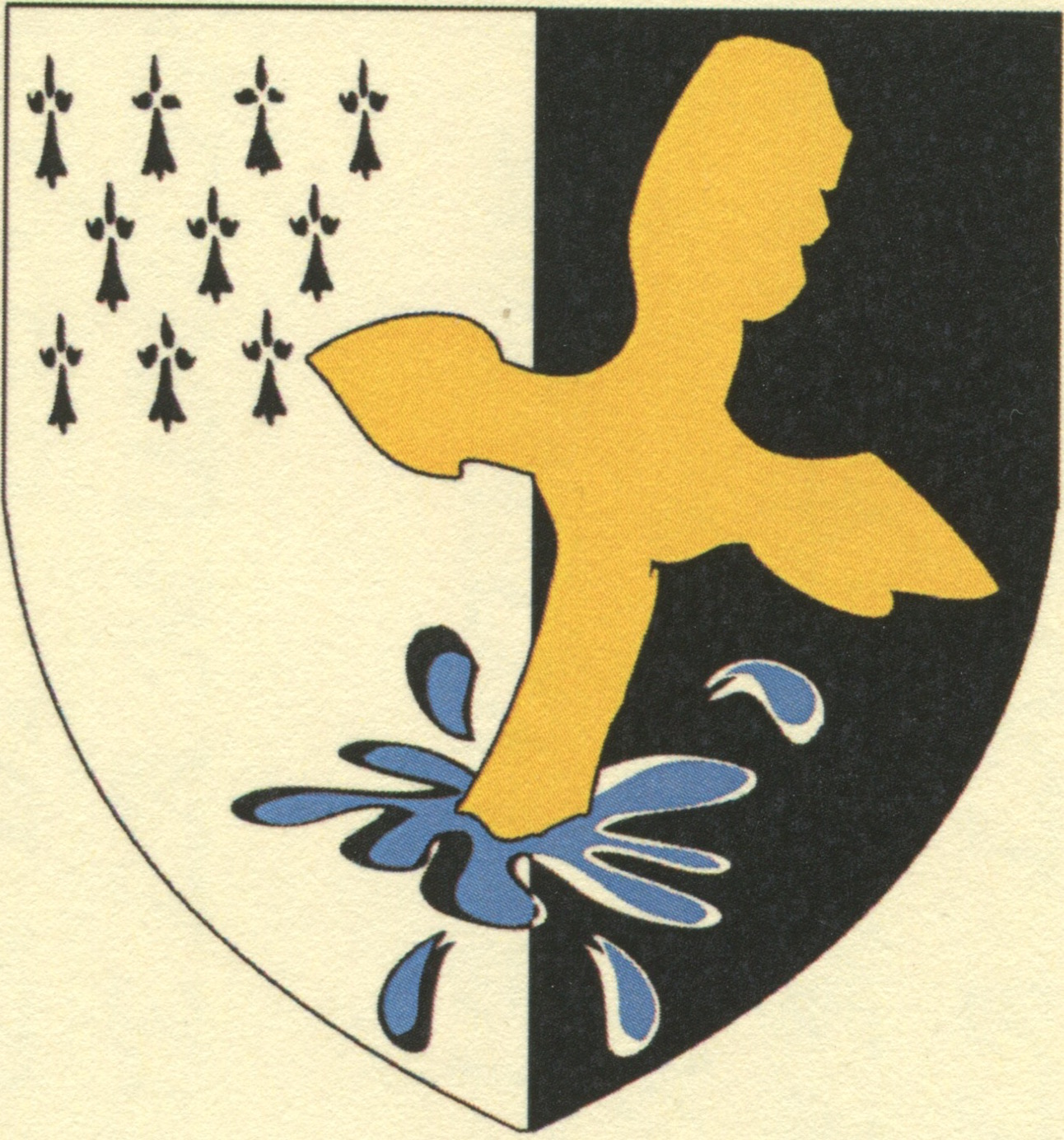
- Coat of arms
- Location of La Landec
- Location within France Location within Brittany
- Coordinates: 48°26′11″N 2°10′43″W
- Country: France
- Region: Brittany
- Department: Côtes-d'Armor
- Arrondissement: Dinan
- Canton: Plancoët
- Intercommunality: Dinan Agglomération

Government
  - Mayor (2020–2026): Didier Saillard
- Area^{1}: 7.59 km^{2} (2.93 sq mi)
- Highest elevation: 125 m (410 ft)
- Lowest elevation: 62 m (203 ft)
- Population (2023): 761
  - Density: 100/km^{2} (260/sq mi)
- Time zone: UTC+01:00 (CET)
  - Summer (DST): UTC+02:00 (CEST)
- INSEE/Postal code: 22097 /22980
- ^{1} French Land Register data, which excludes lakes, ponds, glaciers > 1 km^{2} (0.386 sq mi or 247 acres) and river estuaries.

La Landec (French pronunciation: [la lɑ̃dɛk]; Breton: Lannandeg; Gallo: Lalandéc) is a commune in the Côtes-d'Armor department of Brittany in northwestern France.

== Population ==
Historical population
Year	Pop.	±% p.a.
1968	396	—
1975	369	−1.00%
1982	447	+2.78%
1990	472	+0.68%
1999	460	−0.29%
2007	644	+4.30%
2012	744	+2.93%
2017	723	−0.57%
2023	761	+0.86%
Source: INSEE

Inhabitants of La Landec are called landécois in French.

== See also ==
- Communes of the Côtes-d'Armor department
