= Languenan =

Languenan Langenan
- Commune
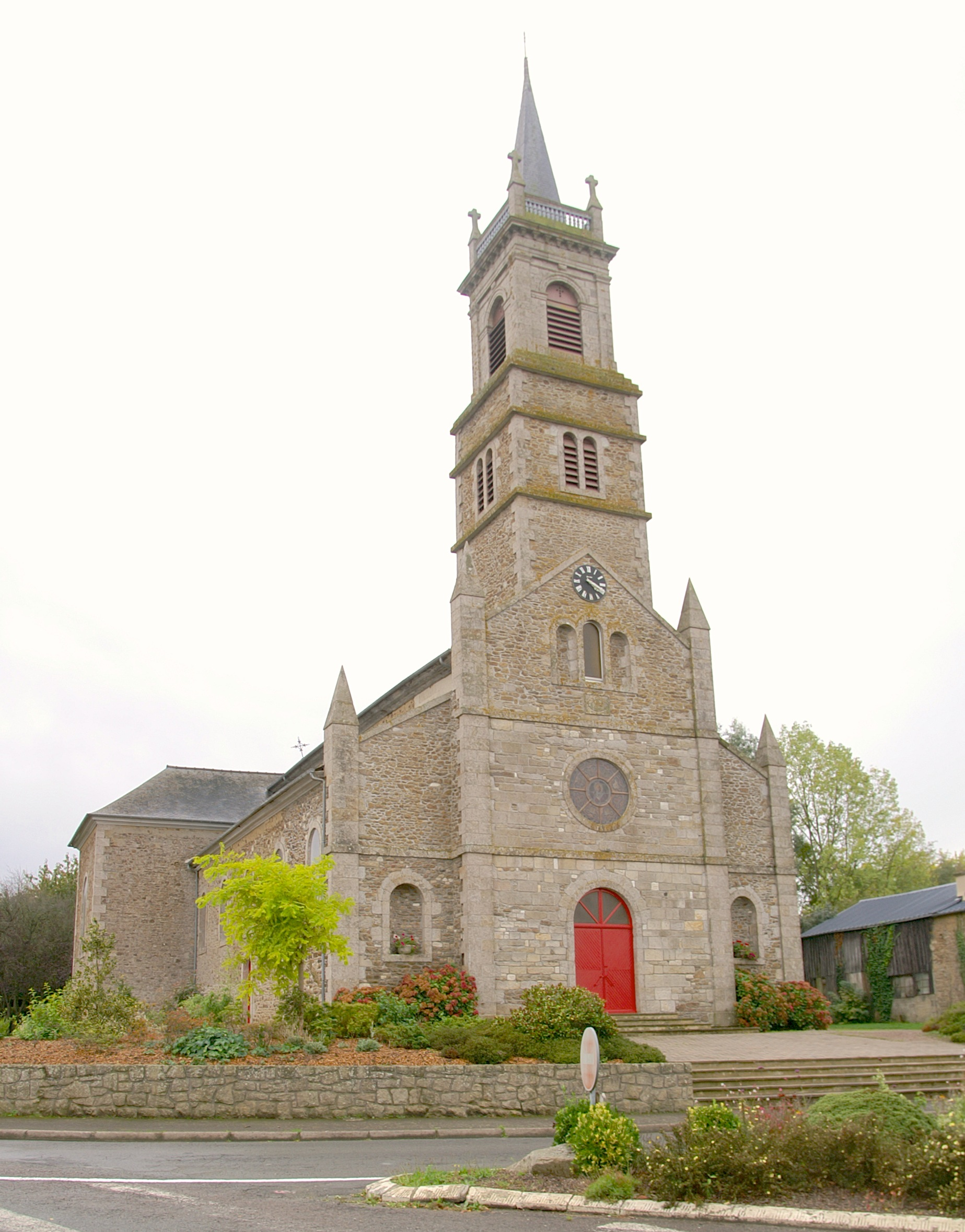
- The church of Languenan
- Location of Languenan
- Location within France Location within Brittany
- Coordinates: 48°30′41″N 2°07′34″W
- Country: France
- Region: Brittany
- Department: Côtes-d'Armor
- Arrondissement: Dinan
- Canton: Plancoët
- Intercommunality: Dinan Agglomération

Government
  - Mayor (2022–2026): Didier Morain
- Area^{1}: 15.95 km^{2} (6.16 sq mi)
- Highest elevation: 131 m (430 ft)
- Lowest elevation: 55 m (180 ft)
- Population (2023): 1,170
  - Density: 73.4/km^{2} (190/sq mi)
- Time zone: UTC+01:00 (CET)
  - Summer (DST): UTC+02:00 (CEST)
- INSEE/Postal code: 22105 /22130
- ^{1} French Land Register data, which excludes lakes, ponds, glaciers > 1 km^{2} (0.386 sq mi or 247 acres) and river estuaries.

Languenan (French pronunciation: [lɑ̃ɡnɑ̃]; Breton: Langenan) is a commune in the Côtes-d'Armor department of Brittany in northwestern France.

== Population ==
Historical population
Year	Pop.	±% p.a.
1968	792	—
1975	749	−0.79%
1982	769	+0.38%
1990	811	+0.67%
1999	805	−0.08%
2007	1,013	+2.91%
2012	1,136	+2.32%
2017	1,155	+0.33%
2023	1,170	+0.22%
Source: INSEE

Inhabitants of Languenan are called languenanais in French.

== See also ==
- Communes of the Côtes-d'Armor department
