= Guitté =

Guitté Gwitei
- Commune
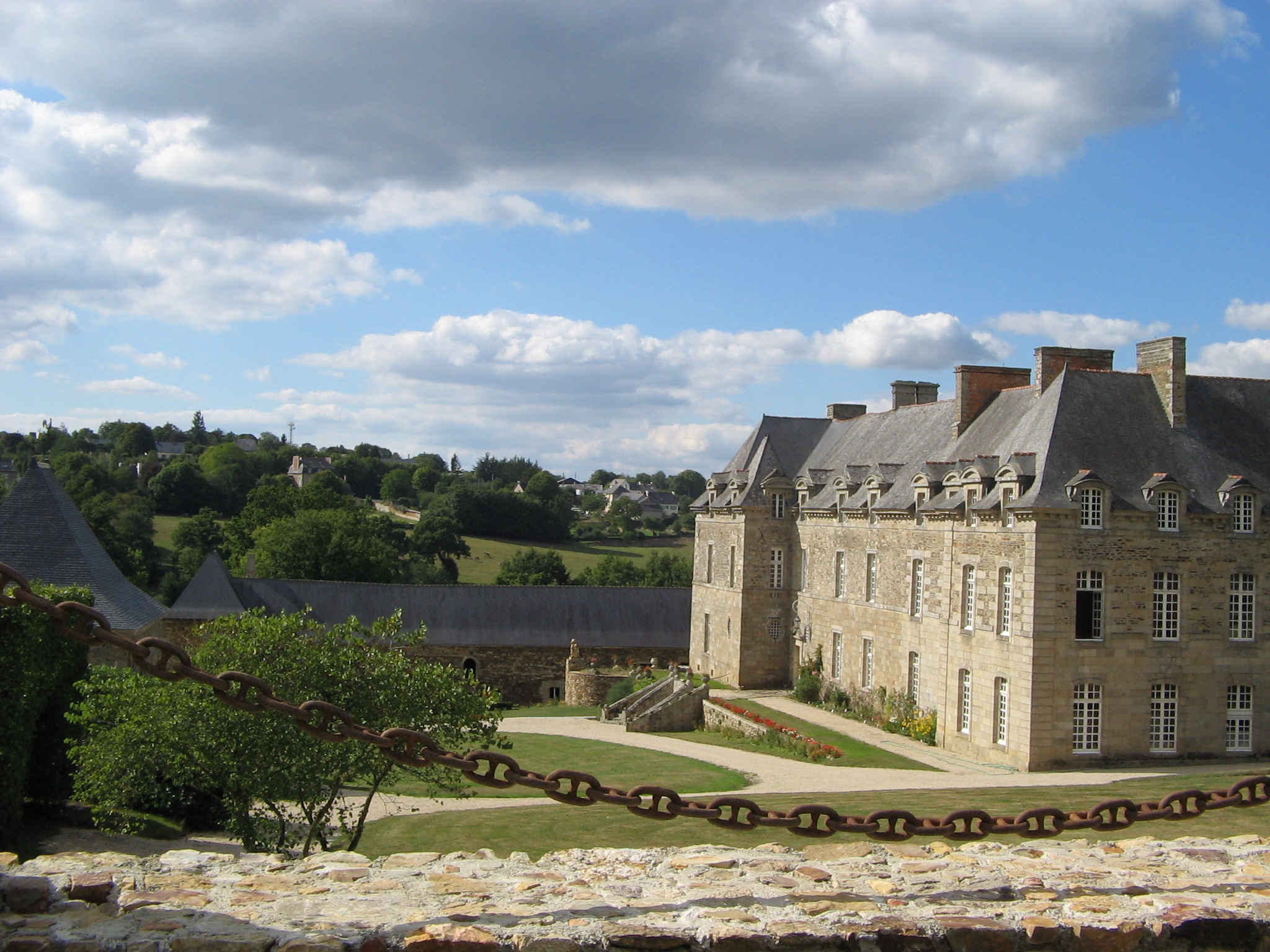
- Chateau of Couëllan

- Coat of arms
- Location of Guitté
- Location within France Location within Brittany
- Coordinates: 48°17′50″N 2°05′36″W
- Country: France
- Region: Brittany
- Department: Côtes-d'Armor
- Arrondissement: Dinan
- Canton: Broons
- Intercommunality: Dinan Agglomération

Government
  - Mayor (2020–2026): Géraldine Lucas
- Area^{1}: 14.53 km^{2} (5.61 sq mi)
- Highest elevation: 137 m (449 ft)
- Lowest elevation: 45 m (148 ft)
- Population (2023): 701
  - Density: 48.2/km^{2} (125/sq mi)
- Time zone: UTC+01:00 (CET)
  - Summer (DST): UTC+02:00 (CEST)
- INSEE/Postal code: 22071 /22350
- ^{1} French Land Register data, which excludes lakes, ponds, glaciers > 1 km^{2} (0.386 sq mi or 247 acres) and river estuaries.

Guitté (Breton: Gwitei, Gallo: Gitei) is a commune in the Côtes-d'Armor department of Brittany in northwestern France.

== Population ==
Historical population
Year	Pop.	±% p.a.
1968	611	—
1975	554	−1.39%
1982	541	−0.34%
1990	524	−0.40%
1999	526	+0.04%
2007	612	+1.91%
2012	653	+1.31%
2017	706	+1.57%
2023	701	−0.12%
Source: INSEE

Inhabitants of Guitté are called guittéens in French.

== See also ==
- Communes of the Côtes-d'Armor department
