= Lanvallay =

Lanvallay Lanvalae
- Commune
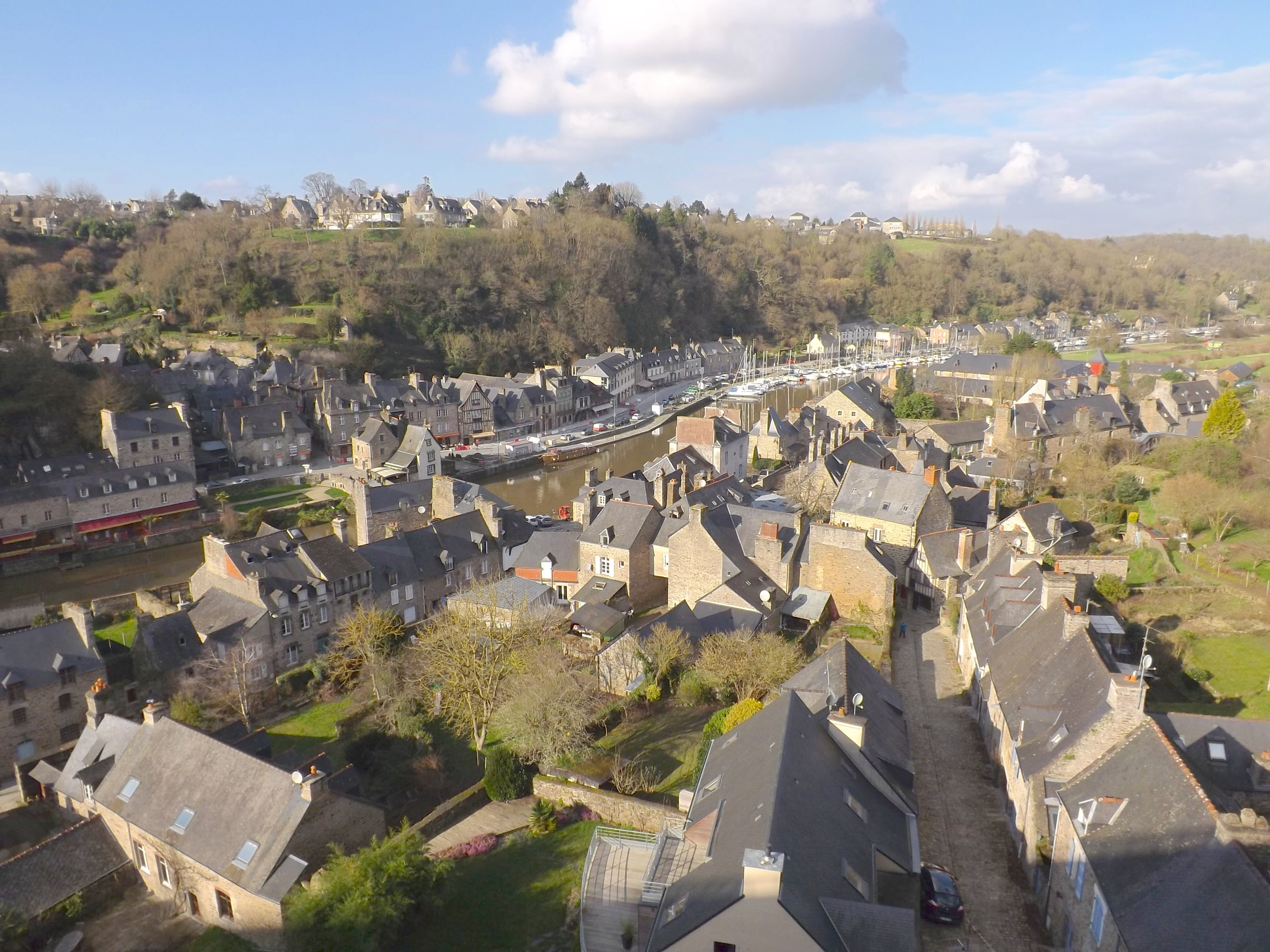
- A view across Lanvallay

- Coat of arms
- Location of Lanvallay
- Location within France Location within Brittany
- Coordinates: 48°27′21″N 2°01′37″W
- Country: France
- Region: Brittany
- Department: Côtes-d'Armor
- Arrondissement: Dinan
- Canton: Lanvallay
- Intercommunality: Dinan Agglomération

Government
  - Mayor (2020–2026): Bruno Ricard
- Area^{1}: 14.61 km^{2} (5.64 sq mi)
- Highest elevation: 87 m (285 ft)
- Lowest elevation: 7 m (23 ft)
- Population (2023): 4,291
  - Density: 293.7/km^{2} (760.7/sq mi)
- Time zone: UTC+01:00 (CET)
  - Summer (DST): UTC+02:00 (CEST)
- INSEE/Postal code: 22118 /22100
- ^{1} French Land Register data, which excludes lakes, ponds, glaciers > 1 km^{2} (0.386 sq mi or 247 acres) and river estuaries.

Lanvallay (French pronunciation: [lɑ̃valɛ]; Breton: Lanvalae) is a commune in the Côtes-d'Armor department of Brittany in northwestern France. In 1973 it absorbed two former communes: Tressaint and Saint-Solen.

== Population ==
Inhabitants of Lanvallay are called côtissois in French.

Historical population
Year	Pop.	±% p.a.
1968	2,274	—
1975	2,901	+3.54%
1982	3,307	+1.89%
1990	3,310	+0.01%
1999	3,068	−0.84%
2007	3,409	+1.33%
2012	3,868	+2.56%
2017	4,187	+1.60%
2023	4,291	+0.41%
Source: INSEE

== Twinning ==
There is a twinning arrangement with Walkern, Hertfordshire. This was initiated around the time of the 800th anniversary of the Magna Carta.

== See also ==
- Communes of the Côtes-d'Armor department
