= Le Quiou =

Le Quiou Ar C'haeoù
- Commune
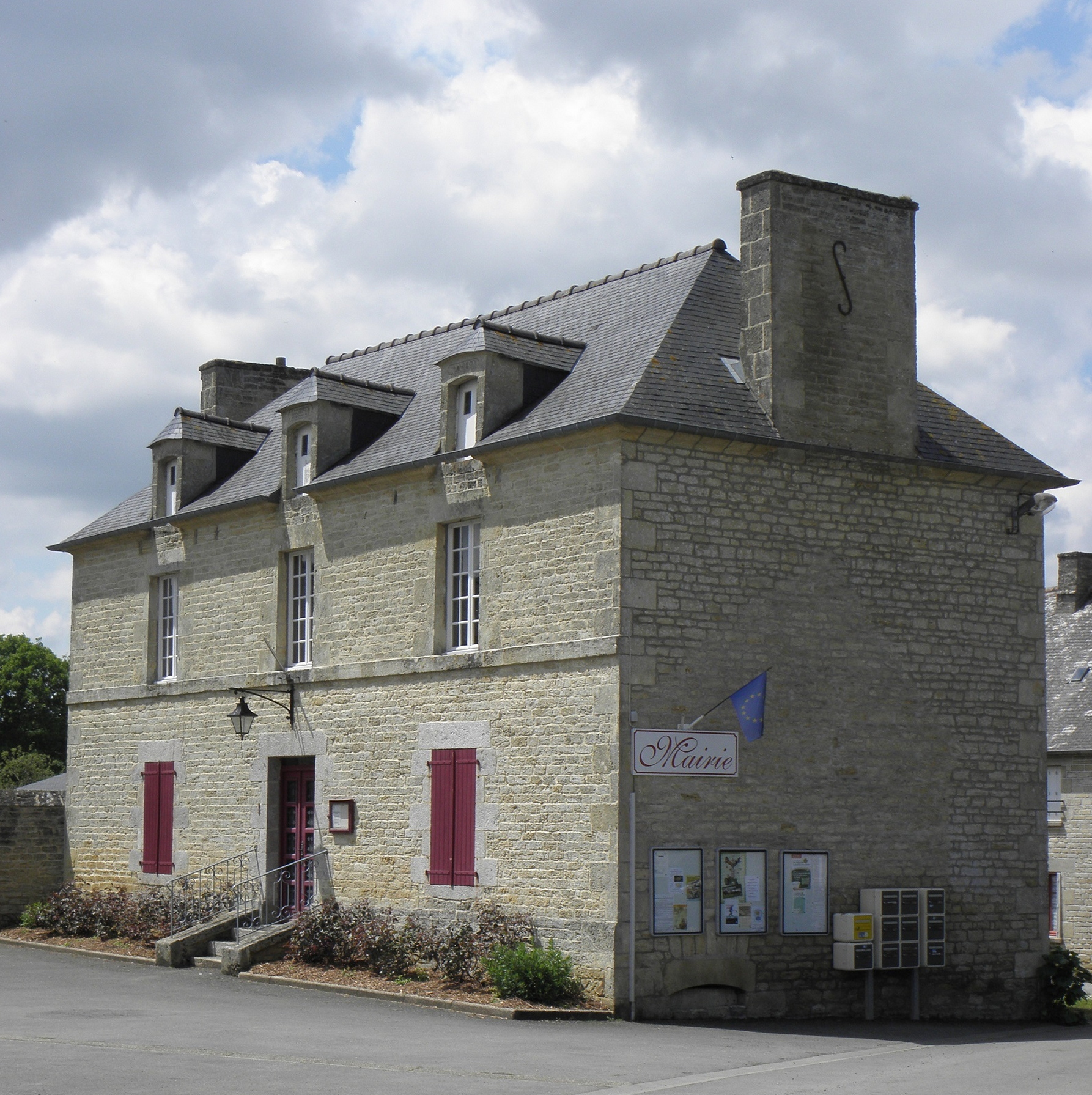
- The town hall of Le Quiou
- Location of Le Quiou
- Location within France Location within Brittany
- Coordinates: 48°21′07″N 2°00′17″W
- Country: France
- Region: Brittany
- Department: Côtes-d'Armor
- Arrondissement: Dinan
- Canton: Lanvallay
- Intercommunality: Dinan Agglomération

Government
  - Mayor (2020–2026): Arnaud Carré
- Area^{1}: 5.06 km^{2} (1.95 sq mi)
- Highest elevation: 77 m (253 ft)
- Lowest elevation: 13 m (43 ft)
- Population (2023): 359
  - Density: 70.9/km^{2} (184/sq mi)
- Time zone: UTC+01:00 (CET)
  - Summer (DST): UTC+02:00 (CEST)
- INSEE/Postal code: 22263 /22630
- ^{1} French Land Register data, which excludes lakes, ponds, glaciers > 1 km^{2} (0.386 sq mi or 247 acres) and river estuaries.

Le Quiou (French pronunciation: [lə kju]; Breton: Ar C'haeoù) is a commune in the Côtes-d'Armor department of Brittany in northwestern France.

== Geography ==
=== Climate ===
Le Quiou has an oceanic climate (Köppen climate classification Cfb). The average annual temperature in Le Quiou is 11.6 °C (52.9 °F). The average annual rainfall is 757.4 mm (29.82 in) with November as the wettest month. The temperatures are highest on average in July and August, at around 17.7 °C (63.9 °F), and lowest in January, at around 6.1 °C (43.0 °F). The highest temperature ever recorded in Le Quiou was 40.4 °C (104.7 °F) on 5 August 2003; the coldest temperature ever recorded was −14.5 °C (5.9 °F) on 25 February 1986.

Climate data for Le Quiou (1991–2020 averages, extremes 1985−2020)
Month	Jan	Feb	Mar	Apr	May	Jun	Jul	Aug	Sep	Oct	Nov	Dec	Year
Record high °C (°F)	17.0 (62.6)	22.1 (71.8)	24.3 (75.7)	28.8 (83.8)	32.0 (89.6)	37.0 (98.6)	39.7 (103.5)	40.4 (104.7)	34.1 (93.4)	30.8 (87.4)	21.6 (70.9)	17.0 (62.6)	40.4 (104.7)
Mean daily maximum °C (°F)	9.3 (48.7)	10.4 (50.7)	13.3 (55.9)	16.2 (61.2)	19.4 (66.9)	22.5 (72.5)	24.7 (76.5)	24.6 (76.3)	21.9 (71.4)	17.3 (63.1)	12.7 (54.9)	9.7 (49.5)	16.8 (62.2)
Daily mean °C (°F)	6.1 (43.0)	6.6 (43.9)	8.5 (47.3)	10.5 (50.9)	13.4 (56.1)	16.0 (60.8)	17.7 (63.9)	17.7 (63.9)	15.4 (59.7)	12.5 (54.5)	9.0 (48.2)	6.4 (43.5)	11.6 (52.9)
Mean daily minimum °C (°F)	3.0 (37.4)	2.7 (36.9)	3.7 (38.7)	4.8 (40.6)	7.4 (45.3)	9.4 (48.9)	10.7 (51.3)	10.8 (51.4)	8.9 (48.0)	7.6 (45.7)	5.2 (41.4)	3.2 (37.8)	6.4 (43.5)
Record low °C (°F)	−12.0 (10.4)	−14.5 (5.9)	−7.2 (19.0)	−4.8 (23.4)	−1.6 (29.1)	2.6 (36.7)	4.5 (40.1)	3.5 (38.3)	0.7 (33.3)	−5.5 (22.1)	−6.6 (20.1)	−8.5 (16.7)	−14.5 (5.9)
Average precipitation mm (inches)	71.8 (2.83)	58.3 (2.30)	50.6 (1.99)	54.5 (2.15)	62.8 (2.47)	52.8 (2.08)	46.6 (1.83)	52.3 (2.06)	57.1 (2.25)	78.0 (3.07)	86.0 (3.39)	86.6 (3.41)	757.4 (29.82)
Average precipitation days (≥ 1.0 mm)	12.6	11.5	9.7	10.3	9.4	7.8	7.8	8.2	8.5	12.1	14.0	14.3	126.3
Source: Meteociel

== Population ==
Historical population
Year	Pop.	±% p.a.
1968	331	—
1975	319	−0.53%
1982	313	−0.27%
1990	286	−1.12%
1999	305	+0.72%
2007	321	+0.64%
2012	338	+1.04%
2017	305	−2.03%
2023	359	+2.75%
Source: INSEE

The inhabitants of Le Quiou are known in French as quiousiens.

== See also ==
- Communes of the Côtes-d'Armor department
