= Plouasne =

Plouasne Plouan
- Commune
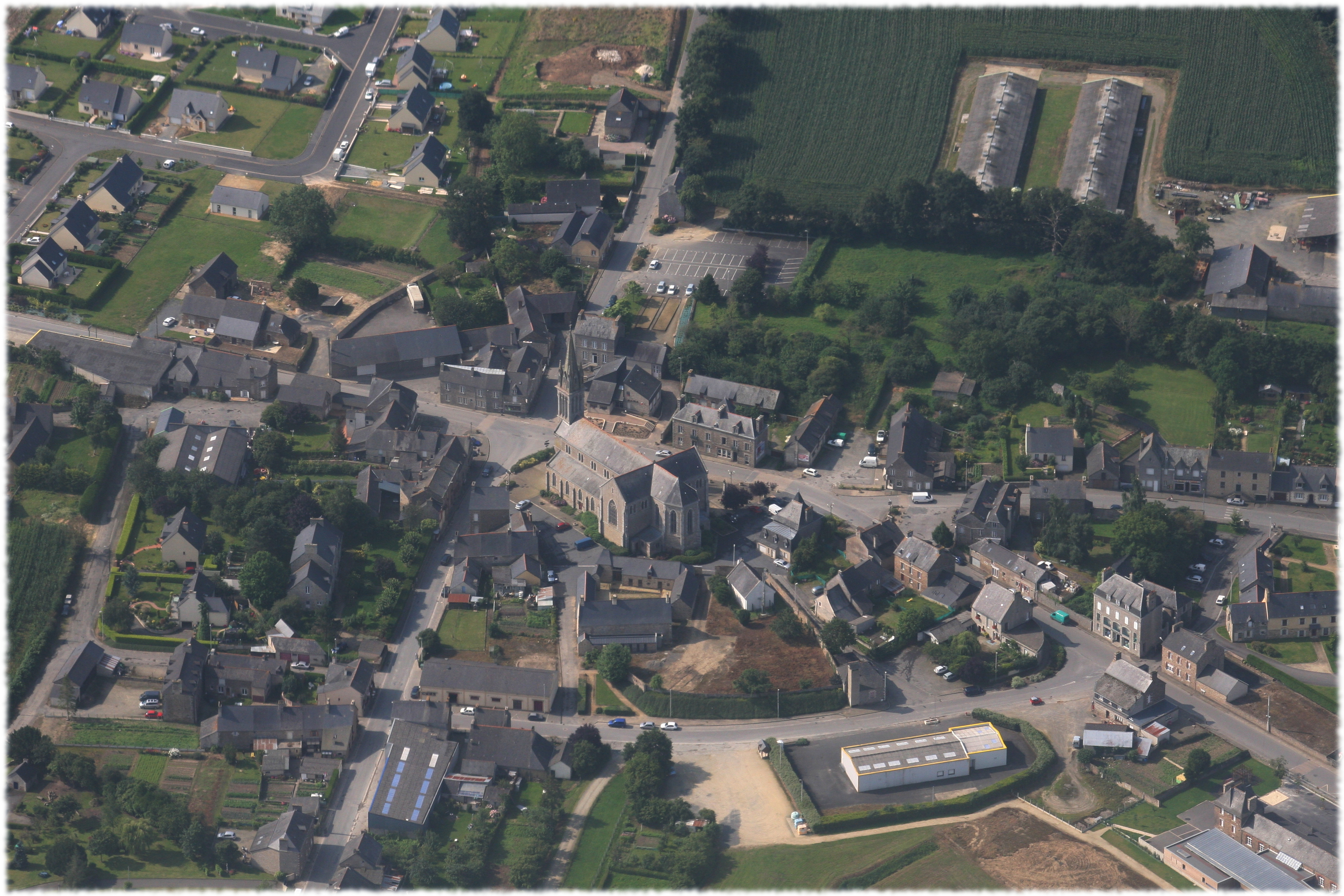
- An aerial view of Plouasne

- Coat of arms
- Location of Plouasne
- Location within France Location within Brittany
- Coordinates: 48°18′07″N 2°00′21″W
- Country: France
- Region: Brittany
- Department: Côtes-d'Armor
- Arrondissement: Dinan
- Canton: Lanvallay
- Intercommunality: Dinan Agglomération

Government
  - Mayor (2020–2026): Michel Daugan
- Area^{1}: 33.61 km^{2} (12.98 sq mi)
- Highest elevation: 181 m (594 ft)
- Lowest elevation: 17 m (56 ft)
- Population (2023): 1,798
  - Density: 53.50/km^{2} (138.6/sq mi)
- Time zone: UTC+01:00 (CET)
  - Summer (DST): UTC+02:00 (CEST)
- INSEE/Postal code: 22208 /22830
- Website: https://www.plouasne.fr
- ^{1} French Land Register data, which excludes lakes, ponds, glaciers > 1 km^{2} (0.386 sq mi or 247 acres) and river estuaries.

Plouasne (French pronunciation: [pluan]; Breton: Plouan) is a commune in the Côtes-d'Armor department of Brittany in northwestern France.

The inhabitants of Plouasne are known in French as plouasnais.

== Population ==
Historical population
Year	Pop.	±% p.a.
1968	1,726	—
1975	1,653	−0.62%
1982	1,553	−0.89%
1990	1,440	−0.94%
1999	1,358	−0.65%
2007	1,487	+1.14%
2012	1,616	+1.68%
2017	1,714	+1.18%
2023	1,798	+0.80%
Source: INSEE

== Education ==
There is a public primary school, and a private school named École Privée Saint-Joseph.

The community has Collège La Gautrais, a junior high school. Circa 2014 the school banned usage of mobile phones, which was before Emmanuel Macron, in 2018, proposed a national such ban.

== See also ==
- Communes of the Côtes-d'Armor department
