= Saint-Juvat =

Saint-Juvat Sant-Yuvad
- Commune
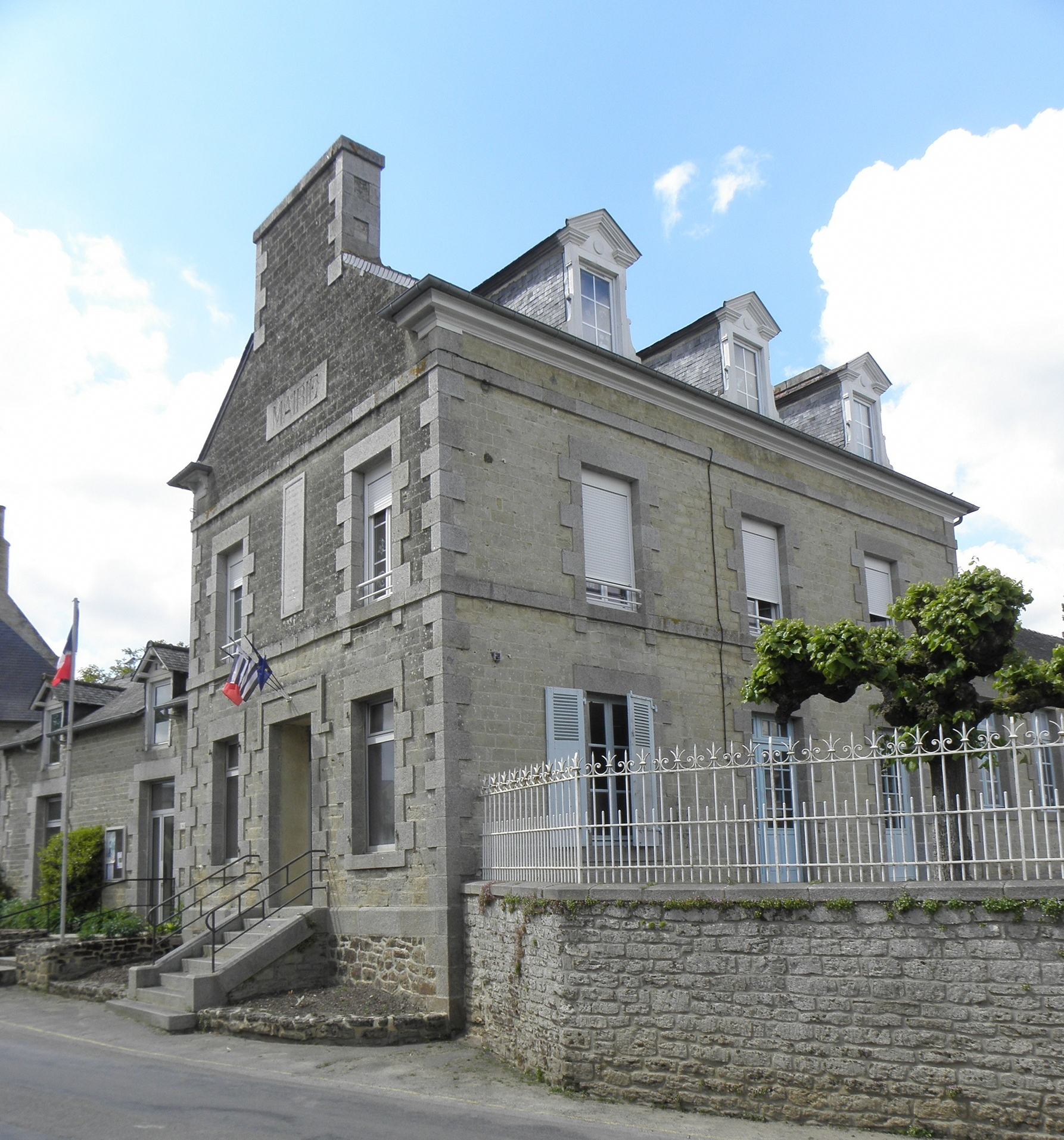
- The town hall and school of Saint-Juvat
- Location of Saint-Juvat
- Location within France Location within Brittany
- Coordinates: 48°21′15″N 2°02′33″W
- Country: France
- Region: Brittany
- Department: Côtes-d'Armor
- Arrondissement: Dinan
- Canton: Lanvallay
- Intercommunality: Dinan Agglomération

Government
  - Mayor (2020–2026): Dominique Ramard
- Area^{1}: 17.41 km^{2} (6.72 sq mi)
- Highest elevation: 71 m (233 ft)
- Lowest elevation: 13 m (43 ft)
- Population (2023): 663
  - Density: 38.1/km^{2} (98.6/sq mi)
- Time zone: UTC+01:00 (CET)
  - Summer (DST): UTC+02:00 (CEST)
- INSEE/Postal code: 22308 /22630
- ^{1} French Land Register data, which excludes lakes, ponds, glaciers > 1 km^{2} (0.386 sq mi or 247 acres) and river estuaries.

Saint-Juvat (French pronunciation: [sɛ̃ ʒyva]; Breton: Sant-Yuvad; Gallo: Saent-Juvat) is a commune in the Côtes-d'Armor department of Brittany in northwestern France.

== Population ==
Historical population
Year	Pop.	±% p.a.
1968	704	—
1975	652	−1.09%
1982	664	+0.26%
1990	678	+0.26%
1999	648	−0.50%
2007	632	−0.31%
2012	646	+0.44%
2017	653	+0.22%
2023	663	+0.25%
Source: INSEE

Inhabitants of Saint-Juvat are called juvatiens in French.

== See also ==
- Communes of the Côtes-d'Armor department
