= Tréfumel =

Tréfumel Trefermael
- Commune
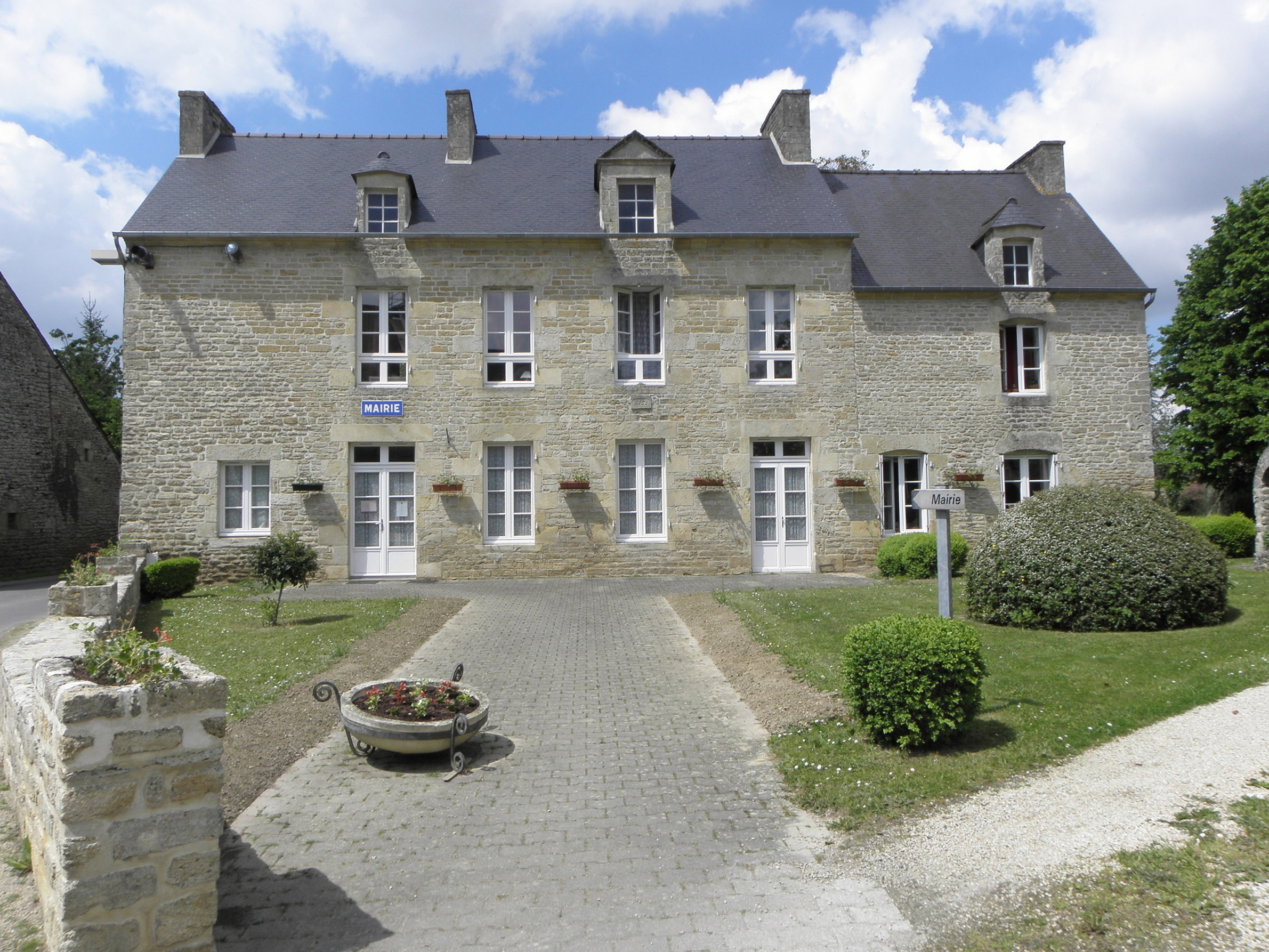
- The town hall of Tréfumel

- Coat of arms
- Location of Tréfumel
- Location within France Location within Brittany
- Coordinates: 48°20′20″N 2°01′29″W
- Country: France
- Region: Brittany
- Department: Côtes-d'Armor
- Arrondissement: Dinan
- Canton: Lanvallay
- Intercommunality: Dinan Agglomération

Government
  - Mayor (2020–2026): Françoise Hédé
- Area^{1}: 5.81 km^{2} (2.24 sq mi)
- Highest elevation: 50 m (160 ft)
- Lowest elevation: 15 m (49 ft)
- Population (2023): 282
  - Density: 48.5/km^{2} (126/sq mi)
- Time zone: UTC+01:00 (CET)
  - Summer (DST): UTC+02:00 (CEST)
- INSEE/Postal code: 22352 /22630
- ^{1} French Land Register data, which excludes lakes, ponds, glaciers > 1 km^{2} (0.386 sq mi or 247 acres) and river estuaries.

Tréfumel (French pronunciation: [tʁefymɛl]; Breton: Trefermael) is a commune in the Côtes-d'Armor department of Brittany in northwestern France.

== Population ==
Historical population
Year	Pop.	±% p.a.
1968	325	—
1975	321	−0.18%
1982	278	−2.03%
1990	262	−0.74%
1999	246	−0.70%
2007	255	+0.45%
2012	278	+1.74%
2017	273	−0.36%
2023	282	+0.54%
Source: INSEE

Inhabitants of Tréfumel are called tréfumellois in French.

== See also ==
- Communes of the Côtes-d'Armor department
