= Arguenon =

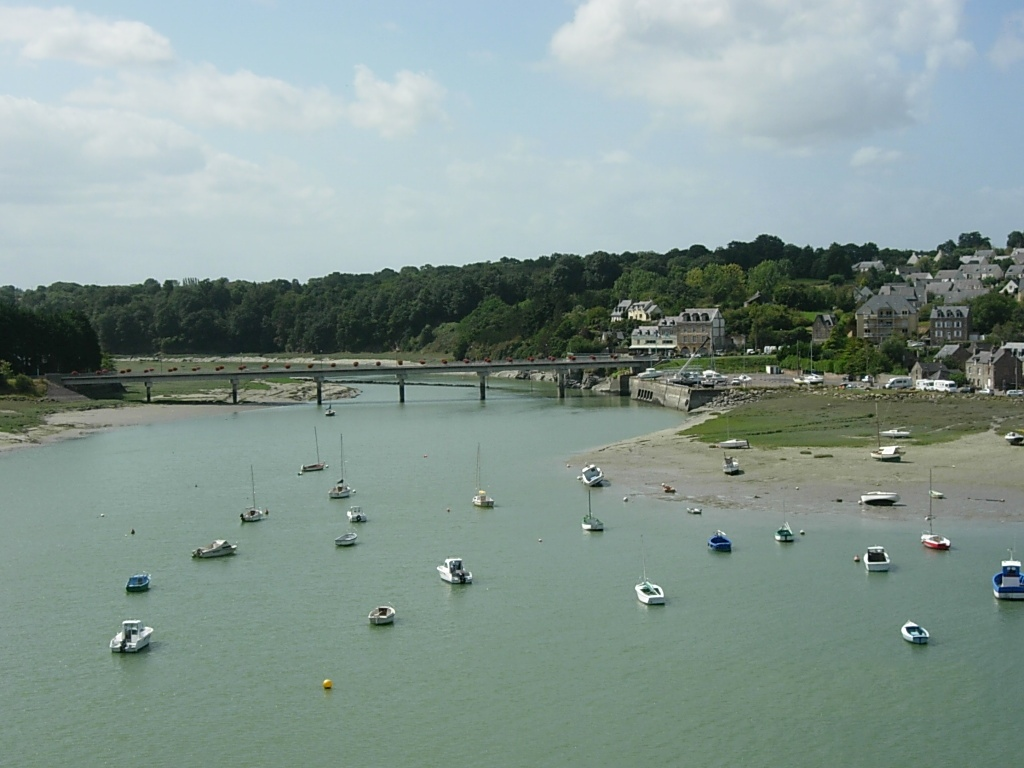
- Mouth of the Arguenon between the communes of Créhen and Saint-Cast-le-Guildo

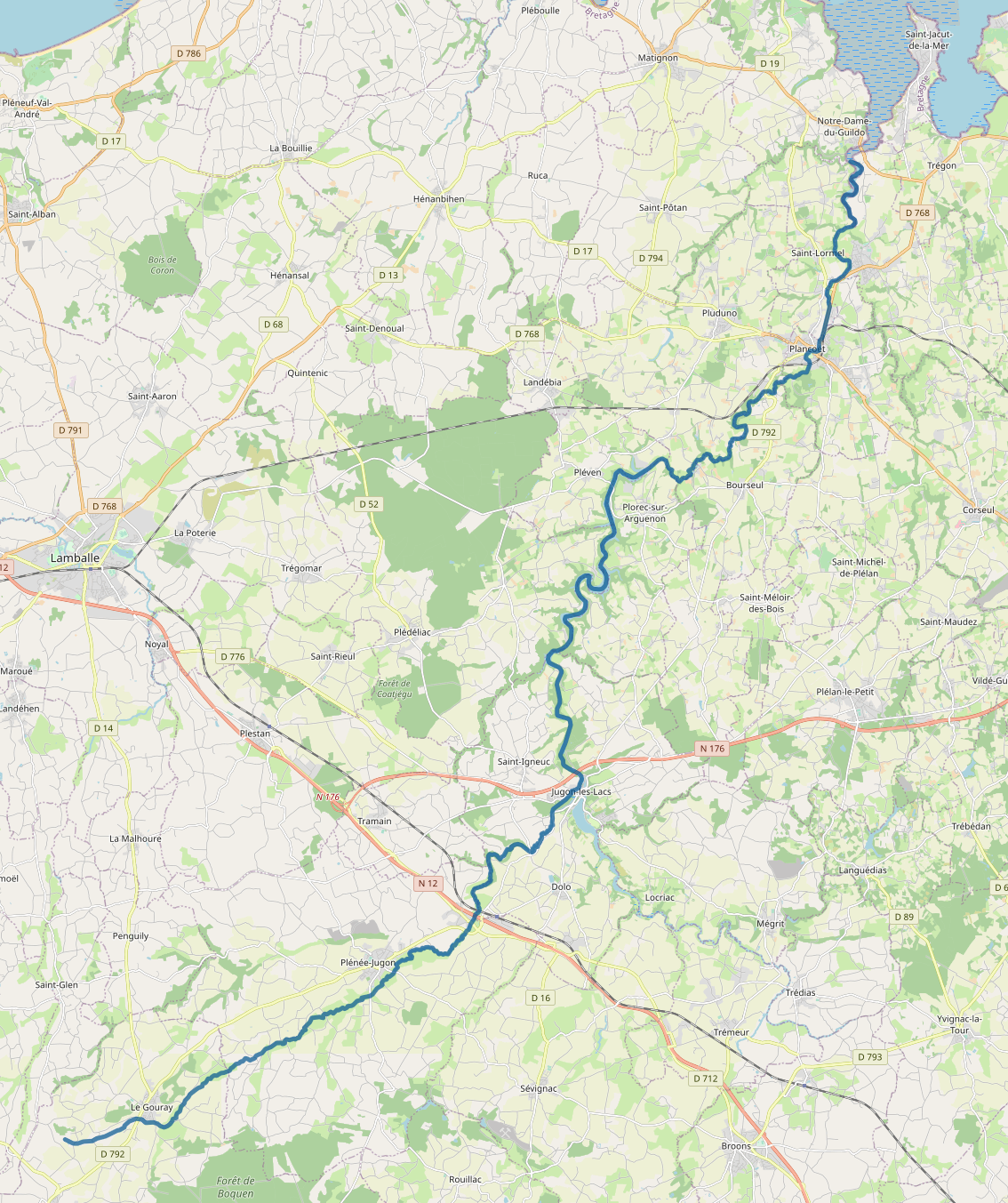
- Course of the Arguenon

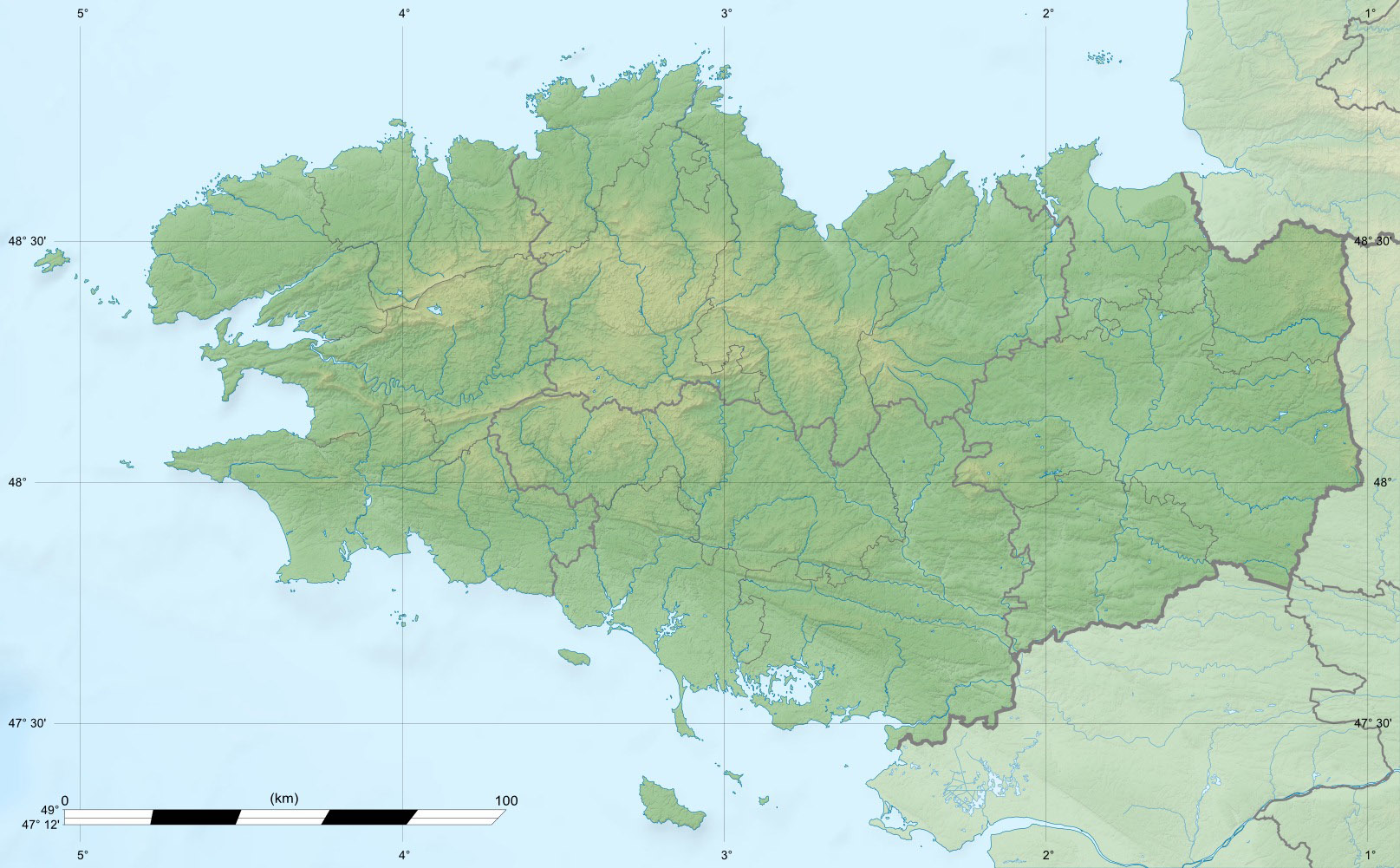
- Location within France Location within Brittany

Location
- Country: France
- Region: Brittany
- Department: Côtes-d'Armor

Physical characteristics
- Source
  - location: Le Gouray
  - coordinates: 48.3196°N 2.5214°W
  - elevation: 200 metres (660 ft)
- Mouth: English Channel
  - location: near Saint-Jacut-de-la-Mer
  - coordinates: 48.5702°N 2.218°W
  - elevation: 0 metres (0 ft)
- Length: 53.36 kilometres (33.16 mi)
- Basin size: 534 square kilometres (206 sq mi)
- Discharge
  - average: 4.83 cubic metres per second (171 cu ft/s)

Basin features
- Tributaries
  - left: Guébriand
  - right: Rosette

The Arguenon (French pronunciation: [aʁɡənɔ̃]; Breton: Argenon) is a French coastal river in the Côtes-d'Armor department of the Brittany region. It flows into the English Channel.

== Geography ==
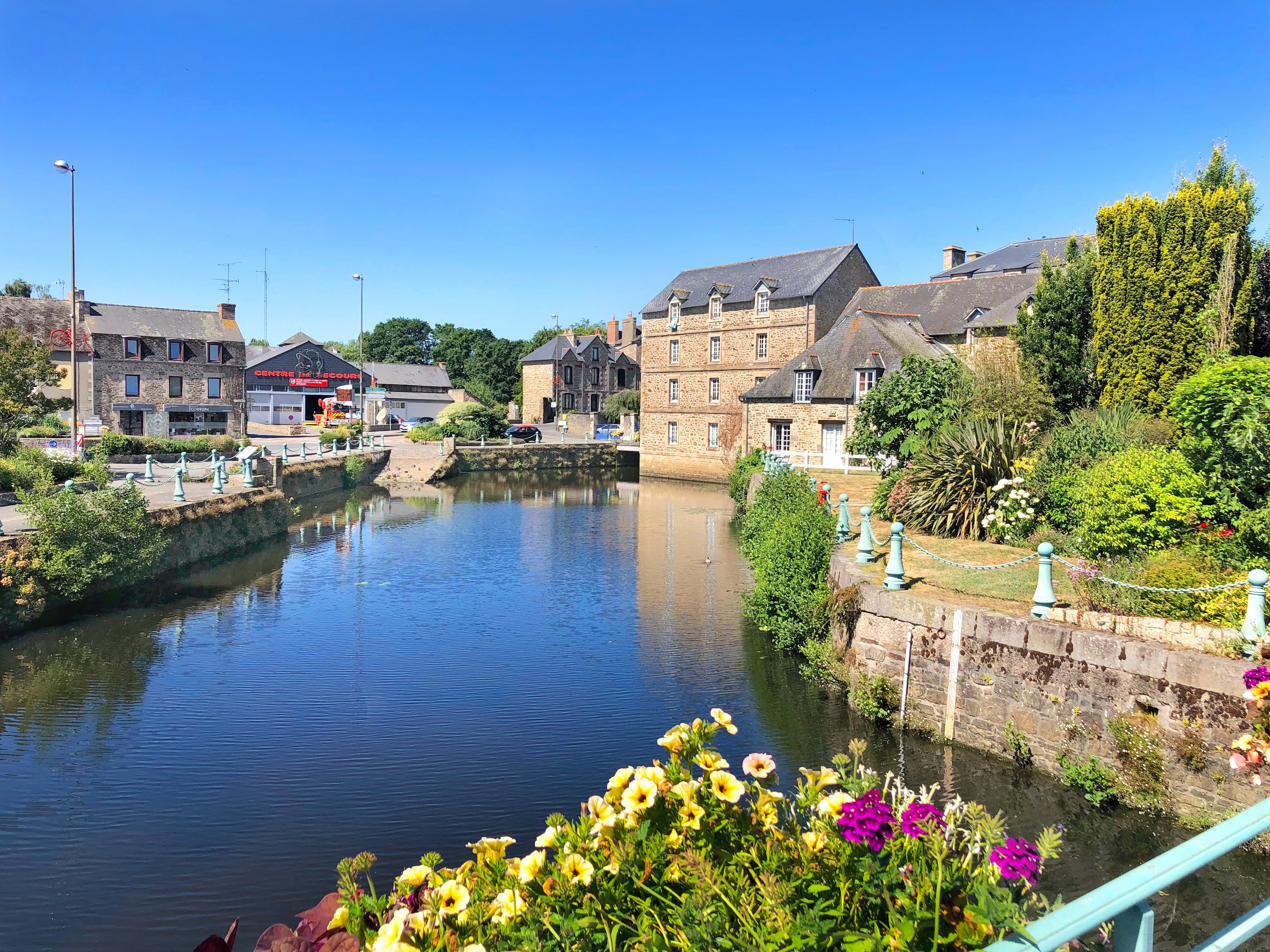
The Arguenon at Plancoët

The length of the watercourse is 53.4 kilometres (33.2 mi). (Note: The length is 54 km according to Sandre and 64 km according to the Brittany migratory fish observatory. The length given in this article is that of Sandre since it is the official French reference.) The river rises in the commune of Le Gouray in Côtes-d'Armor and flows into the sea near Saint-Jacut-de-la-Mer, in the commune of Créhen, in the Bay of Arguenon. The Arguenon is very wide between Jugon-les-Lacs and Plorec-sur-Arguenon. The Ville-Hatte dam built in 1972 to supply the department with drinking water has created a water reservoir more than 10 kilometres (6.2 mi) long named Lac d'Arguenon.

The Arguenon runs northeast from its source to Jugon-les-Lacs, north between Jugon-les-Lacs and Plorec-sur-Arguenon, northeast again between Plorec-sur-Arguenon and Plancoët and north-northeast from Plancoët to its mouth.

During high tides a small tidal bore rises up the river, up to the height of the Guildo bridge.

=== Communes and cantons crossed ===
The Arguenon's course is entirely within the Côtes-d'Armor department. It crosses twelve communes, from upstream to downstream: Le Gouray (source), Plénée-Jugon, Dolo, Jugon-les-Lacs, Plorec-sur-Arguenon, Plédéliac, Pléven, Bourseul, Pluduno, Plancoët, Saint-Lormel, Créhen and Saint-Cast-le-Guildo (mouth).

=== Managing body ===
The managing body is SAGE Arguenon – Baie de la Fresnaye.

== Tributaries ==
The Arguenon has four named tributary streams, one river and 10 unnamed tributaries including:

- Rosette river, 31.2 kilometres (19.4 mi), enlarged by the Rieule, 13.8 kilometres (8.6 mi).
- Bos Robert stream, 5.6 kilometres (3.5 mi), in the two municipalities of Langourla and Plénée-Jugon.
- Quiloury stream, 14.7 kilometres (9.1 mi), in the four municipalities of Le Gouray, Penguily, Plénée-Jugon and Saint-Glen.
- Étang du Guillier stream, 6.2 kilometres (3.9 mi), over the four municipalities of Jugon-les-Lacs, Plédéliac, Plestan and Tramain.
- Montafilan stream, 16.3 kilometres (10.1 mi), in the six municipalities of Corseul, Créhen, Plancoët, Plélan-le-Petit, Saint-Maudez and Saint-Michel-de-Plélan.

We can also add, according to the National Institute of Geographic and Forest Information or Géoportail, and since the Guébriand is not a river in its own right:

- The Guébriand, 19.8 kilometres (12.3 mi), passing through the commune of Landébia and joining the Arguenon between the communes of Saint-Lormel and Saint-Cast-le-Guildo at the entrance to Arguenon bay opposite the town of Créhen.

== Hydrology ==
=== Arguenon at Jugon-les-Lacs ===
The Arguenon has been observed in Jugon-les-Lacs since 1972 at station J1103010 L'Arguenon, at an altitude of 31 metres (102 ft) with a catchment area of 104 kilometres (64.62 mi). The annual average of its flow at this point is 0.829 cubic metres per second (29.3 cu ft/s).

Average flow at Jugon-les-Lacs in m3/s
Hydrological station: J1103010 - L'Arguenon in Jugon-les-Lacs
2015-08-08 - data calculated over 44 years from 1972 to 2015

=== Low water ===
At low water the minimum flow rate of the watercourse recorded for three consecutive days in a month, during a five-year dry period, was 0.014 cubic metres per second (0.49 cu ft/s).

=== Floods ===
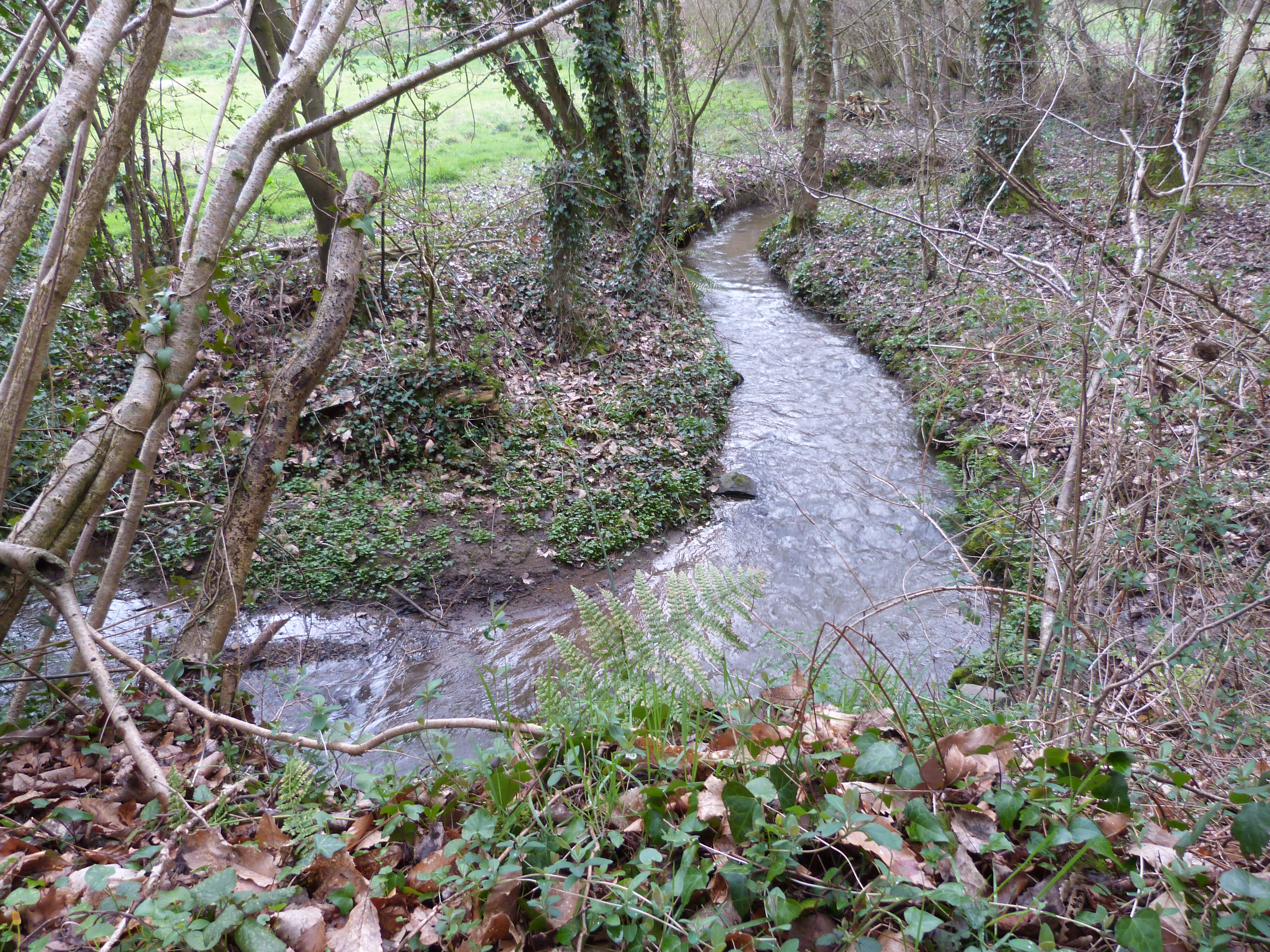
The Arguenon at Gouray

During the observation period, the maximum daily flow was observed on 28 February 2010 at 24.80 cubic metres per second (876 cu ft/s). The maximum instantaneous flow (QIX: quantité instantanée maximale) was observed at 14:21 on 28 February 2010 was 36.10 cubic metres per second (1,275 cu ft/s), and at the same time the instantaneous maximum height was 217 centimetres (85 in).

The 10-year QIX is 23 cubic metres per second (810 cu ft/s), the 20-year QIX is 28 cubic metres per second (990 cu ft/s) and the 50-year QIX is 34 cubic metres per second (1,200 cu ft/s) while the 2-year QIX is 11 cubic metres per second (390 cu ft/s) and the 5-year QIX is 18 cubic metres per second (640 cu ft/s).

The Arguenon has experienced several significant floods. The first took place in 1974. The water overflowed 1 metre (3 ft 3 in) on the Plancoët quay, causing major and widespread damage. The second took place in 2010, this time with 50 centimetres (20 in) on the quayside. The floodwater affected a lot of businesses. The last took place in February 2014, with 1.45 metres (4 ft 9 in) on the quays. Shops were closed permanently and a park was completely flooded.

=== Depth of runoff and specific flow ===
The depth of runoff in this part of the river's catchment area is 253 millimetres (10.0 in) annually, which is a little lower than the average in France. The specific flow rate reaches 8.0 litres per second (106 imp gal/min) per 1 square kilometre (0.39 sq mi) of basin.

== Facilities and ecology ==
The Arguenon is crossed by Route nationale 176 and Route nationale 12.

The Arguenon estuary is protected by a 381 hectares (940 acres) Zone naturelle d'intérêt écologique, faunistique et floristique.

Arguenon Bay is part of the Natura 2000 zone Lancieux Bay, Arguenon Bay, Saint Malo and Dinard Archipelago.

== Sources ==
- Fiche cours d'eau - L'Arguenon (J11-0300), Sandre; Service d'administration nationale des données et référentiels sur l'eau
- Géoportail (France), Géoportail, Institut national de l'information géographique et forestière
- "INPN - FSD Natura 2000 - FR5300012 - Baie de Lancieux, Baie de l'Arguenon, Archipel de Saint Malo et Dinard - Description", inpn.mnhn.fr
- "INPN, ZNIEFF 530030026 - ESTUAIRE DE L'ARGUENON - Description" (PDF), inpn.mnhn.fr
- "L'Arguenon à Jugon-les-Lacs", Banque Hydro (in French), Ministry of the Ecological Transition (France)
- Observatoire des Poissons Migrateurs en Bretagne, L'Arguenon, le Montafilan et le Guébriand
- "SAGE Arguenon - Baie de la Fresnaye", www.smap22.fr
