= Val-d'Arguenon =

- Commune
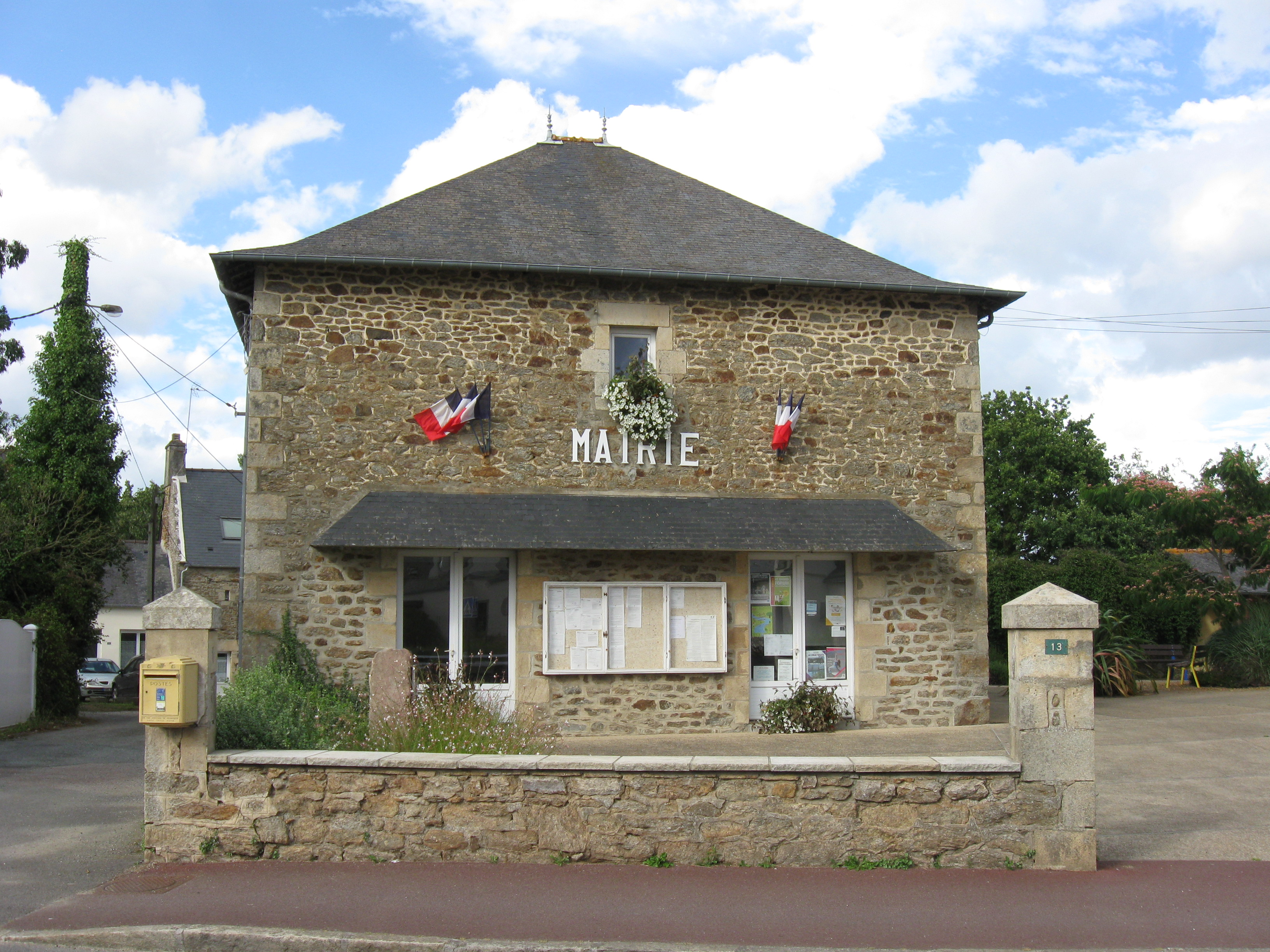
- Town hall
- Location of Val-d'Arguenon
- Location within France Location within Brittany
- Coordinates: 48°31′54″N 2°16′07″W
- Country: France
- Region: Brittany
- Department: Côtes-d'Armor
- Arrondissement: Dinan
- Canton: Plancoët
- Intercommunality: Dinan Agglomération

Government
  - Mayor (2025–2026): Maxime Leborgne
- Area^{1}: 38.05 km^{2} (14.69 sq mi)
- Population (2023): 2,844
  - Density: 74.74/km^{2} (193.6/sq mi)
- Time zone: UTC+01:00 (CET)
  - Summer (DST): UTC+02:00 (CEST)
- INSEE/Postal code: 22237 /22130
- ^{1} French Land Register data, which excludes lakes, ponds, glaciers > 1 km^{2} (0.386 sq mi or 247 acres) and river estuaries.

Val-d'Arguenon (French pronunciation: [val daʁɡənɔ̃] ; Breton: Traoñ-Argenon ; lit. 'Vale of Arguenon') is a commune in the Côtes-d'Armor department in northern France. It was formed on 1 January 2025 by merger of the former communes of Pléven and Pluduno (the seat).

== Population ==
Population data refer to the commune in its geography as of January 2025.

Historical population
Year	Pop.	±% p.a.
1968	1,995	—
1975	2,077	+0.58%
1982	2,172	+0.64%
1990	2,270	+0.55%
1999	2,246	−0.12%
2007	2,542	+1.56%
2012	2,710	+1.29%
2017	2,775	+0.48%
2023	2,844	+0.41%
Source: INSEE

== See also ==
- Communes of the Côtes-d'Armor department
