= Singing Stones of Brittany =

Basalt rocks in Brittany, France

Coordinates: 48°34′32.83″N 2°12′42.12″W

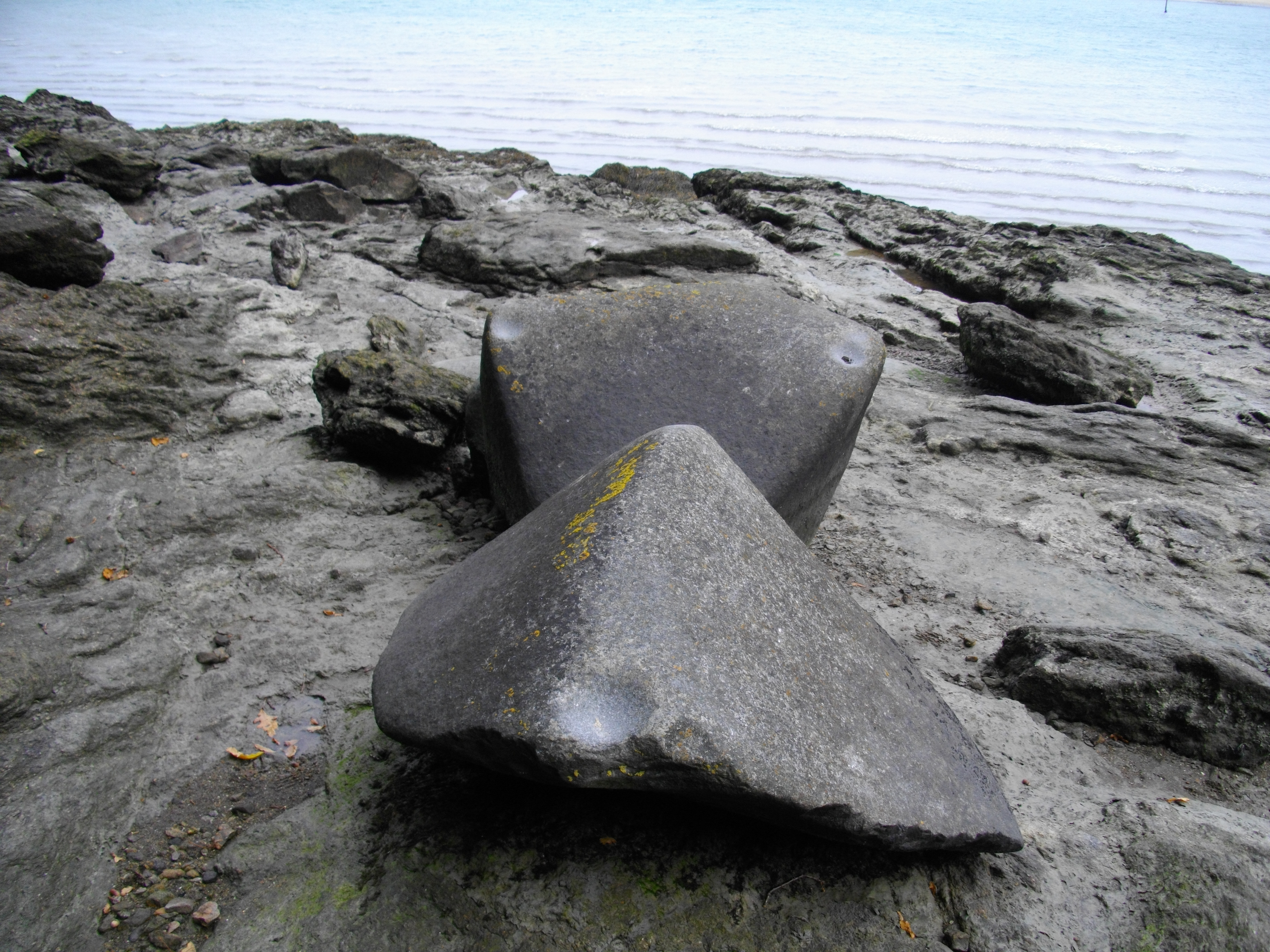
The stones

The Singing Stones of Brittany (or Pierres sonnantes du Guildo) are a number of rocks located on the left bank of the river Arguenon opposite the ruined castle of Gilles de Bretagne at Notre-Dame-le-Guildo, near Dinard in the Côtes-d'Armor, France.

The stones are round and smooth, shiny black and extremely large, weighing in excess of ten tonnes each and are made of a heavy metallic stone that rings like a bell if struck by another smaller piece of the same stone. There are hundreds of tonnes of them and there is no indication of where they came from or how they got there. They are basalt, but this type of rock is usually associated with volcanic eruptions and there is no evidence or history of volcanic activity there.

The stones are unlike any of the surrounding stones either on the ground or on the cliff face overlooking them; legend has it that these stones were spewed up by the giant Gargantua.
