= Saint-Michel-de-Plélan =

Saint-Michel-de-Plélan Sant-Mikael-Plelann
- Commune
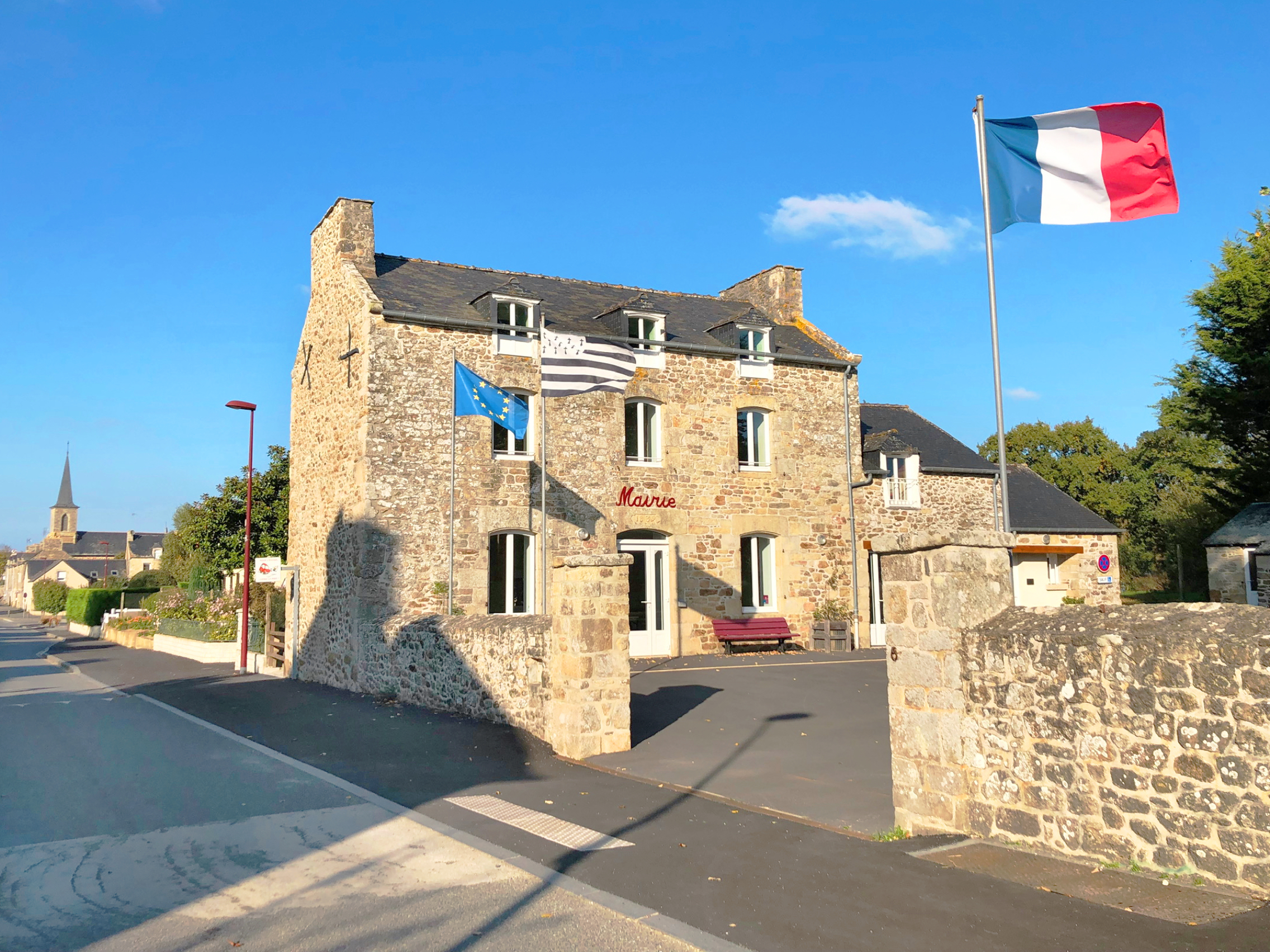
- The village of Saint-Michel-de-Plélan
- Location of Saint-Michel-de-Plélan
- Location within France Location within Brittany
- Coordinates: 48°28′01″N 2°12′50″W
- Country: France
- Region: Brittany
- Department: Côtes-d'Armor
- Arrondissement: Dinan
- Canton: Plancoët
- Intercommunality: Dinan Agglomération

Government
  - Mayor (2020–2026): Jean-Yves Villalon
- Area^{1}: 7.24 km^{2} (2.80 sq mi)
- Highest elevation: 107 m (351 ft)
- Lowest elevation: 32 m (105 ft)
- Population (2023): 334
  - Density: 46.1/km^{2} (119/sq mi)
- Time zone: UTC+01:00 (CET)
  - Summer (DST): UTC+02:00 (CEST)
- INSEE/Postal code: 22318 /22980
- ^{1} French Land Register data, which excludes lakes, ponds, glaciers > 1 km^{2} (0.386 sq mi or 247 acres) and river estuaries.

Saint-Michel-de-Plélan (French pronunciation: [sɛ̃ miʃɛl də plelɑ̃], literally Saint-Michel of Plélan; Breton: Sant-Mikael-Plelann) is a commune in the Côtes-d'Armor department of Brittany in northwestern France.

== Population ==
Historical population
Year	Pop.	±% p.a.
1968	310	—
1975	259	−2.54%
1982	281	+1.17%
1990	277	−0.18%
1999	249	−1.18%
2007	291	+1.97%
2012	325	+2.23%
2017	321	−0.25%
2023	334	+0.66%
Source: INSEE

Inhabitants of Saint-Michel-de-Plélan are called michelois in French.

== See also ==
- Communes of the Côtes-d'Armor department
