= Le Gouray =

Le Gouray Gorre
- Part of Le Mené
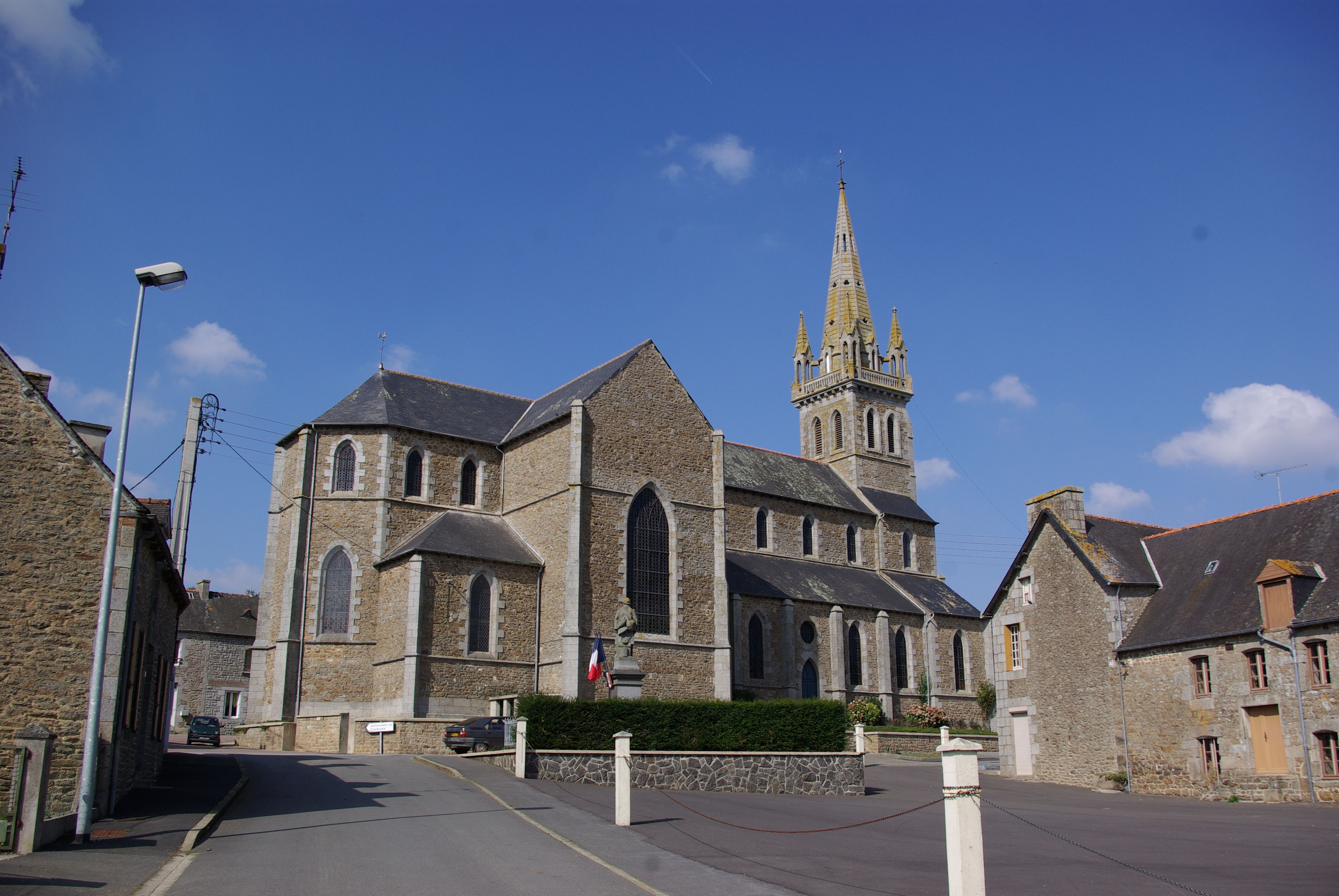

- Coat of arms
- Location of Le Gouray
- Location within France Location within Brittany
- Coordinates: 48°19′41″N 2°29′15″W
- Country: France
- Region: Brittany
- Department: Côtes-d'Armor
- Arrondissement: Dinan
- Canton: Plénée-Jugon
- Commune: Le Mené
- Area^{1}: 30.50 km^{2} (11.78 sq mi)
- Highest elevation: 305 m (1,001 ft)
- Lowest elevation: 79 m (259 ft)
- Population (2022): 1,289
  - Density: 42.26/km^{2} (109.5/sq mi)
- Time zone: UTC+01:00 (CET)
  - Summer (DST): UTC+02:00 (CEST)
- Postal code: 22330
- ^{1} French Land Register data, which excludes lakes, ponds, glaciers > 1 km^{2} (0.386 sq mi or 247 acres) and river estuaries.

Le Gouray (French pronunciation: [lə guʁɛ]; Breton: Gorre) is a former commune in the Côtes-d'Armor department of Brittany in northwestern France. On 1 January 2016, it was merged into the new commune Le Mené.

The Arguenon river originates in the commune.

== Population ==
Historical population
Year	Pop.	±% p.a.
1962	1,108	—
1968	1,068	−0.61%
1975	988	−1.11%
1982	932	−0.83%
1990	944	+0.16%
1999	939	−0.06%
2006	1,056	+1.69%
2022	1,289	+1.25%
Source: EHESS and INSEE

== Modern History ==
An avowal from 1690 indicates that in Gouray there was a "caquinerie", a hospital where leprosy was treated, and where Caquins lived.

== See also ==
- Communes of the Côtes-d'Armor department
