= Pluduno =

Pluduno Pludunoù
- Part of Val-d'Arguenon
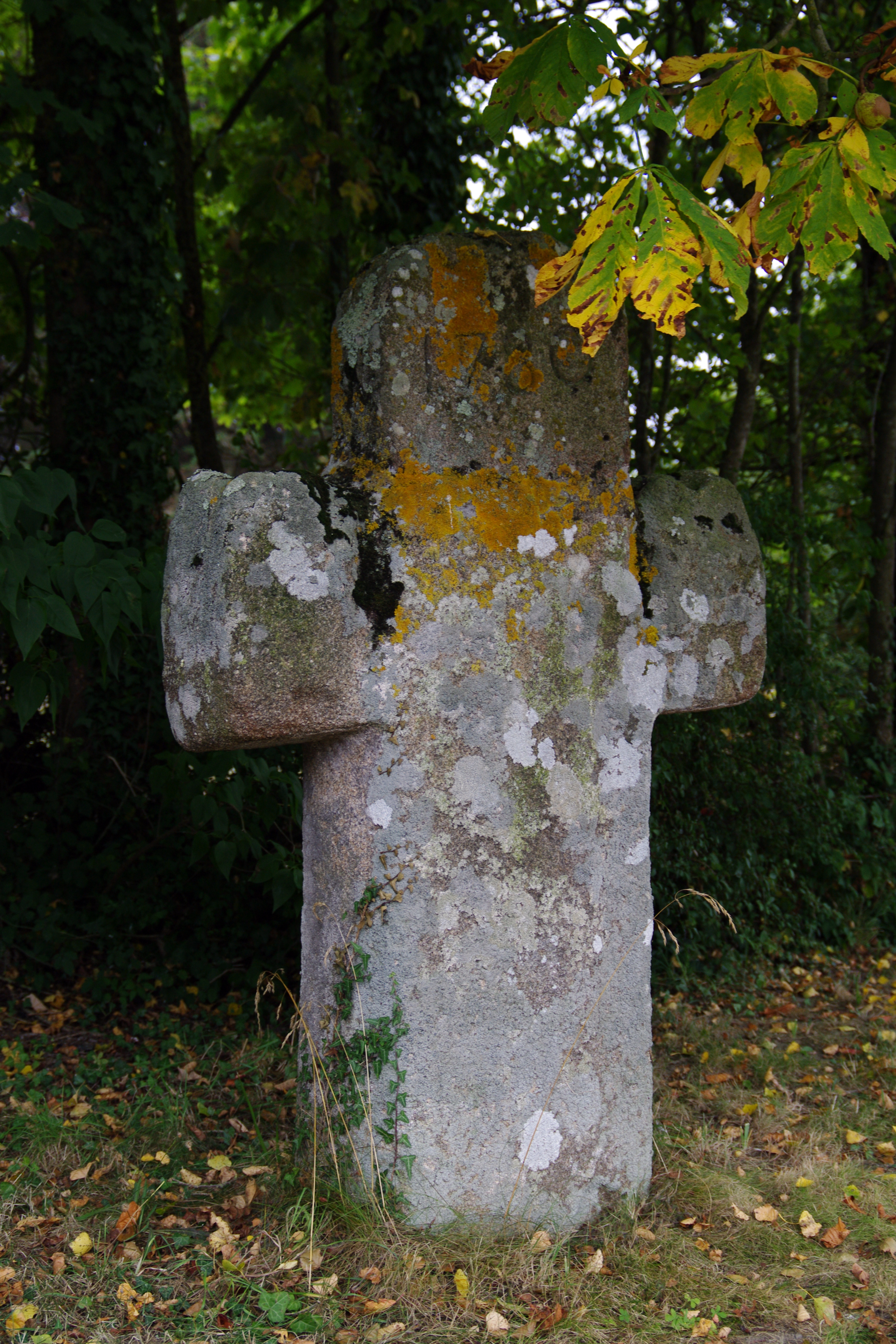
- The monolithic cross in Pluduno
- Location of Pluduno
- Location within France Location within Brittany
- Coordinates: 48°31′53″N 2°16′01″W
- Country: France
- Region: Brittany
- Department: Côtes-d'Armor
- Arrondissement: Dinan
- Canton: Plancoët
- Commune: Val-d'Arguenon
- Area^{1}: 28.32 km^{2} (10.93 sq mi)
- Highest elevation: 77 m (253 ft)
- Lowest elevation: 5 m (16 ft)
- Population (2022): 2,205
  - Density: 77.86/km^{2} (201.7/sq mi)
- Time zone: UTC+01:00 (CET)
  - Summer (DST): UTC+02:00 (CEST)
- Postal code: 22130
- ^{1} French Land Register data, which excludes lakes, ponds, glaciers > 1 km^{2} (0.386 sq mi or 247 acres) and river estuaries.

Pluduno (French pronunciation: [plydyno]; Breton: Pludunoù; Gallo: Ploedunoe) is a former commune in the Côtes-d'Armor department of Brittany in northwestern France. It was merged with Pléven to form Val-d'Arguenon on 1 January 2025.

The Arguenon river flows through the commune.

== Population ==
People from Pluduno are called pludunonéens in French.

Historical population
Year	Pop.	±% p.a.
1968	1,389	—
1975	1,447	+0.59%
1982	1,578	+1.25%
1990	1,692	+0.88%
1999	1,681	−0.07%
2007	1,911	+1.62%
2012	2,143	+2.32%
2017	2,193	+0.46%
Source: INSEE

== See also ==
- Communes of the Côtes-d'Armor department
