= Plancoët =

Plancoët Plangoed
- Commune
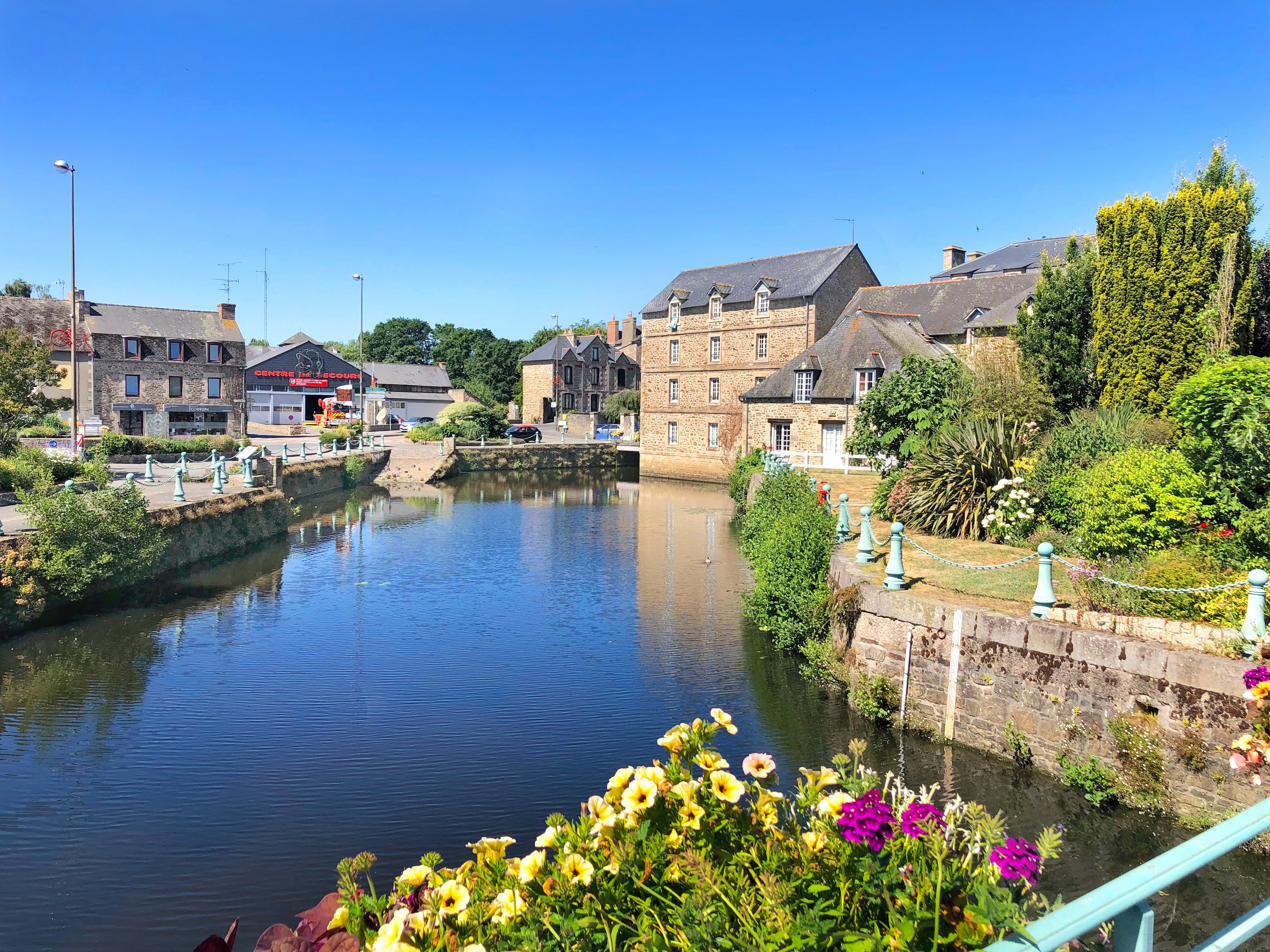
- The port of Plancoët

- Flag Coat of arms
- Location of Plancoët
- Location within France Location within Brittany
- Coordinates: 48°31′26″N 2°13′59″W
- Country: France
- Region: Brittany
- Department: Côtes-d'Armor
- Arrondissement: Dinan
- Canton: Plancoët
- Intercommunality: Dinan Agglomération

Government
  - Mayor (2020–2026): Patrick Barraux
- Area^{1}: 11.49 km^{2} (4.44 sq mi)
- Highest elevation: 87 m (285 ft)
- Lowest elevation: 5 m (16 ft)
- Population (2023): 3,104
  - Density: 270.1/km^{2} (699.7/sq mi)
- Time zone: UTC+01:00 (CET)
  - Summer (DST): UTC+02:00 (CEST)
- INSEE/Postal code: 22172 /22130
- ^{1} French Land Register data, which excludes lakes, ponds, glaciers > 1 km^{2} (0.386 sq mi or 247 acres) and river estuaries.

Plancoët (French pronunciation: [plɑ̃kwɛt]; Breton: Plangoed; Gallo: Plancoét) is a commune in the Côtes-d'Armor department in Brittany in northwestern France.

The Arguenon river flows through the commune.

== Population ==
Inhabitants of Plancoët are called plancoëtins in French.

Historical population
Year	Pop.	±% p.a.
1968	2,304	—
1975	2,375	+0.43%
1982	2,489	+0.67%
1990	2,507	+0.09%
1999	2,589	+0.36%
2007	2,962	+1.70%
2012	3,068	+0.71%
2017	3,013	−0.36%
2023	3,104	+0.50%
Source: INSEE

== See also ==
- Communes of the Côtes-d'Armor department
