= Plorec-sur-Arguenon =

Plorec-sur-Arguenon Ploareg
- Commune
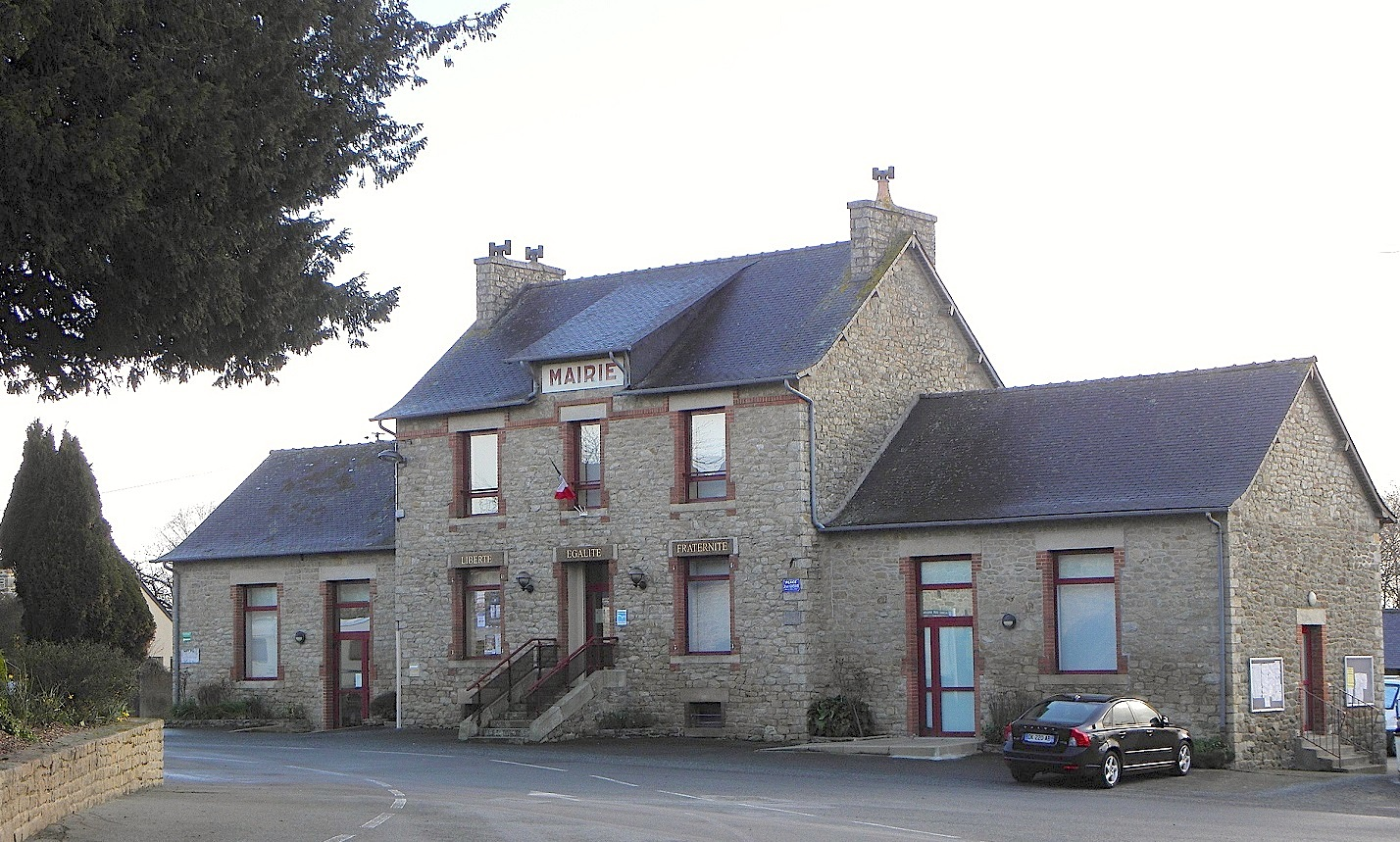
- The town hall in Plorec-sur-Arguenon

- Coat of arms
- Location of Plorec-sur-Arguenon
- Location within France Location within Brittany
- Coordinates: 48°28′49″N 2°17′46″W
- Country: France
- Region: Brittany
- Department: Côtes-d'Armor
- Arrondissement: Dinan
- Canton: Plancoët
- Intercommunality: Dinan Agglomération

Government
  - Mayor (2020–2026): Daniel Fouéré
- Area^{1}: 13.65 km^{2} (5.27 sq mi)
- Highest elevation: 88 m (289 ft)
- Lowest elevation: 7 m (23 ft)
- Population (2023): 467
  - Density: 34.2/km^{2} (88.6/sq mi)
- Time zone: UTC+01:00 (CET)
  - Summer (DST): UTC+02:00 (CEST)
- INSEE/Postal code: 22205 /22130
- ^{1} French Land Register data, which excludes lakes, ponds, glaciers > 1 km^{2} (0.386 sq mi or 247 acres) and river estuaries.

Plorec-sur-Arguenon (French pronunciation: [plɔʁɛk syʁ aʁɡənɔ̃]; Breton: Ploareg) is a commune in the Côtes-d'Armor department of Brittany in northwestern France.

The river Arguenon flows through the commune.

== Population ==
Historical population
Year	Pop.	±% p.a.
1968	551	—
1975	502	−1.32%
1982	503	+0.03%
1990	473	−0.77%
1999	398	−1.90%
2007	396	−0.06%
2012	402	+0.30%
2017	414	+0.59%
2023	467	+2.03%
Source: INSEE

== See also ==
- Communes of the Côtes-d'Armor department
