= Saint-Lormel =

Saint-Lormel Sant-Loheñvel
- Commune
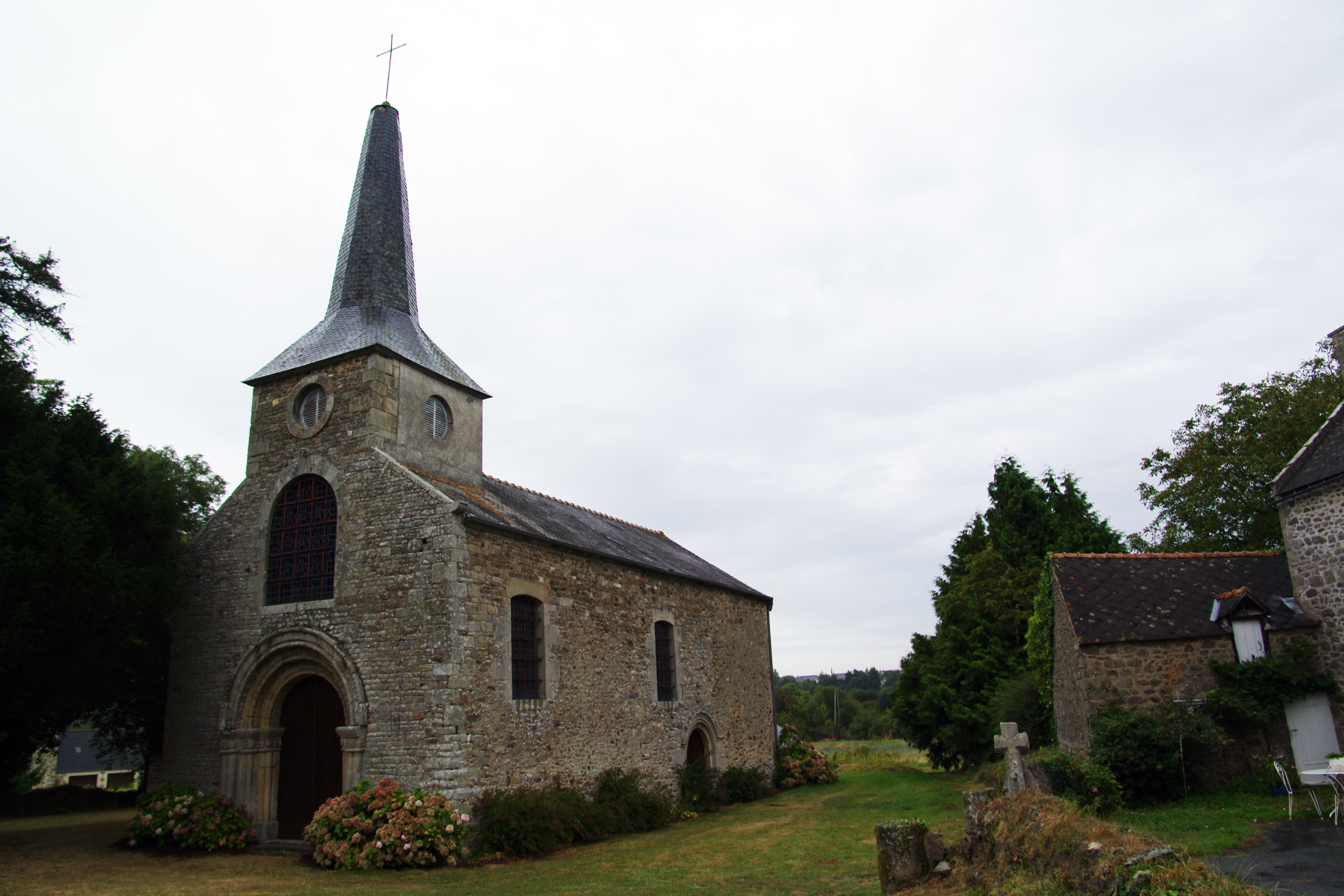
- The old church of Saint-Lunaire, in Saint-Lormel
- Location of Saint-Lormel
- Location within France Location within Brittany
- Coordinates: 48°32′48″N 2°13′42″W
- Country: France
- Region: Brittany
- Department: Côtes-d'Armor
- Arrondissement: Dinan
- Canton: Plancoët
- Intercommunality: Dinan Agglomération

Government
  - Mayor (2020–2026): René Bouan
- Area^{1}: 9.77 km^{2} (3.77 sq mi)
- Highest elevation: 61 m (200 ft)
- Lowest elevation: 0 m (0 ft)
- Population (2023): 882
  - Density: 90.3/km^{2} (234/sq mi)
- Time zone: UTC+01:00 (CET)
  - Summer (DST): UTC+02:00 (CEST)
- INSEE/Postal code: 22311 /22130
- ^{1} French Land Register data, which excludes lakes, ponds, glaciers > 1 km^{2} (0.386 sq mi or 247 acres) and river estuaries.

Saint-Lormel (French pronunciation: [sɛ̃ lɔʁmɛl]; Breton: Sant-Loheñvel) is a commune in the Côtes-d'Armor department of Brittany in northwestern France.

The Arguenon river flows through the commune.

== Population ==
Historical population
Year	Pop.	±% p.a.
1968	716	—
1975	736	+0.39%
1982	780	+0.83%
1990	787	+0.11%
1999	777	−0.14%
2007	883	+1.61%
2012	895	+0.27%
2017	860	−0.79%
2023	882	+0.42%
Source: INSEE

== See also ==
- Communes of the Côtes-d'Armor department
