= Plénée-Jugon =

Plénée-Jugon Plened-Yugon
- Commune
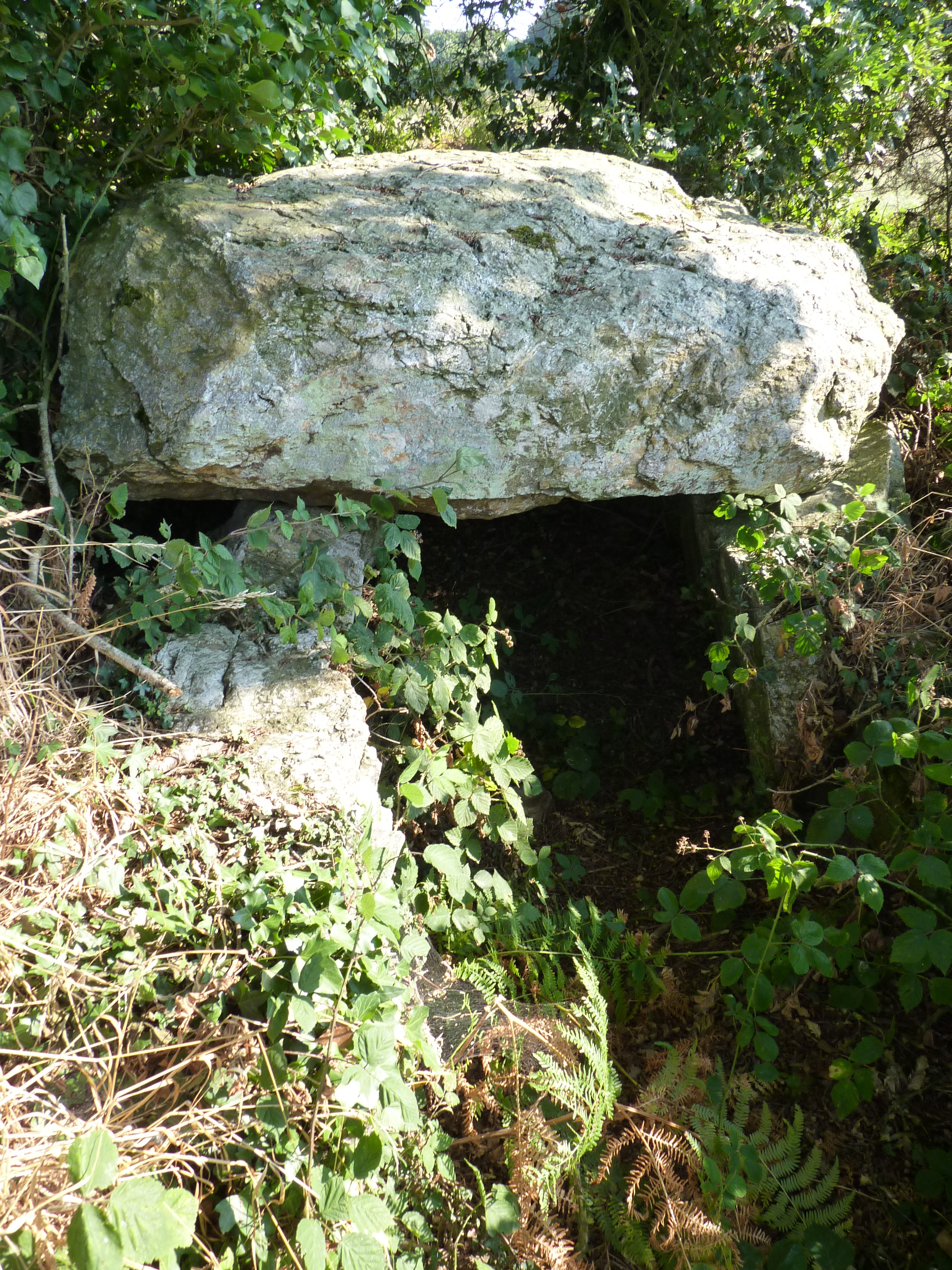
- The allée couverte of La Roche aux Fées de la Brousse, in Plénée-Jugon
- Location of Plénée-Jugon
- Location within France Location within Brittany
- Coordinates: 48°21′54″N 2°23′57″W
- Country: France
- Region: Brittany
- Department: Côtes-d'Armor
- Arrondissement: Saint-Brieuc
- Canton: Plénée-Jugon
- Intercommunality: CA Lamballe Terre et Mer

Government
  - Mayor (2020–2026): Suzanne Bourdé
- Area^{1}: 61.36 km^{2} (23.69 sq mi)
- Highest elevation: 211 m (692 ft)
- Lowest elevation: 35 m (115 ft)
- Population (2023): 2,579
  - Density: 42.03/km^{2} (108.9/sq mi)
- Time zone: UTC+01:00 (CET)
  - Summer (DST): UTC+02:00 (CEST)
- INSEE/Postal code: 22185 /22640
- ^{1} French Land Register data, which excludes lakes, ponds, glaciers > 1 km^{2} (0.386 sq mi or 247 acres) and river estuaries.

Plénée-Jugon (French pronunciation: [plene ʒygɔ̃]; Breton: Plened-Yugon; Gallo: Plénét) is a commune in the Côtes-d'Armor department of Brittany in northwestern France.

The Arguenon river flows through the commune.

== Population ==
Inhabitants of Plénée-Jugon are called plénéens in French.

Historical population

| Year | Pop. | ±% p.a. |
|---|---|---|
| 1793 | 4,001 | — |
| 1800 | 3,932 | −0.25% |
| 1806 | 4,013 | +0.34% |
| 1821 | 4,390 | +0.60% |
| 1831 | 4,537 | +0.33% |
| 1836 | 4,526 | −0.05% |
| 1841 | 4,403 | −0.55% |
| 1846 | 4,439 | +0.16% |
| 1851 | 4,564 | +0.56% |
| 1856 | 4,386 | −0.79% |
| 1861 | 4,223 | −0.75% |
| 1866 | 4,300 | +0.36% |
| 1872 | 4,145 | −0.61% |
| 1876 | 4,247 | +0.61% |
| 1881 | 4,250 | +0.01% |
| 1886 | 4,089 | −0.77% |
| 1891 | 4,020 | −0.34% |
| 1896 | 3,933 | −0.44% |
| 1901 | 3,723 | −1.09% |

| Year | Pop. | ±% p.a. |
|---|---|---|
| 1906 | 3,696 | −0.15% |
| 1911 | 3,568 | −0.70% |
| 1921 | 3,172 | −1.17% |
| 1926 | 3,159 | −0.08% |
| 1931 | 3,071 | −0.56% |
| 1936 | 2,923 | −0.98% |
| 1946 | 2,741 | −0.64% |
| 1954 | 2,578 | −0.76% |
| 1962 | 2,561 | −0.08% |
| 1968 | 2,526 | −0.23% |
| 1975 | 2,464 | −0.35% |
| 1982 | 2,291 | −1.03% |
| 1990 | 2,235 | −0.31% |
| 1999 | 2,265 | +0.15% |
| 2007 | 2,401 | +0.73% |
| 2012 | 2,436 | +0.29% |
| 2017 | 2,410 | −0.21% |
| 2023 | 2,579 | +1.14% |

Source: EHESS and INSEE (1968-2023)

== See also ==
- Communes of the Côtes-d'Armor department
