= Pléven =

Pléven Pleven
- Part of Val-d'Arguenon
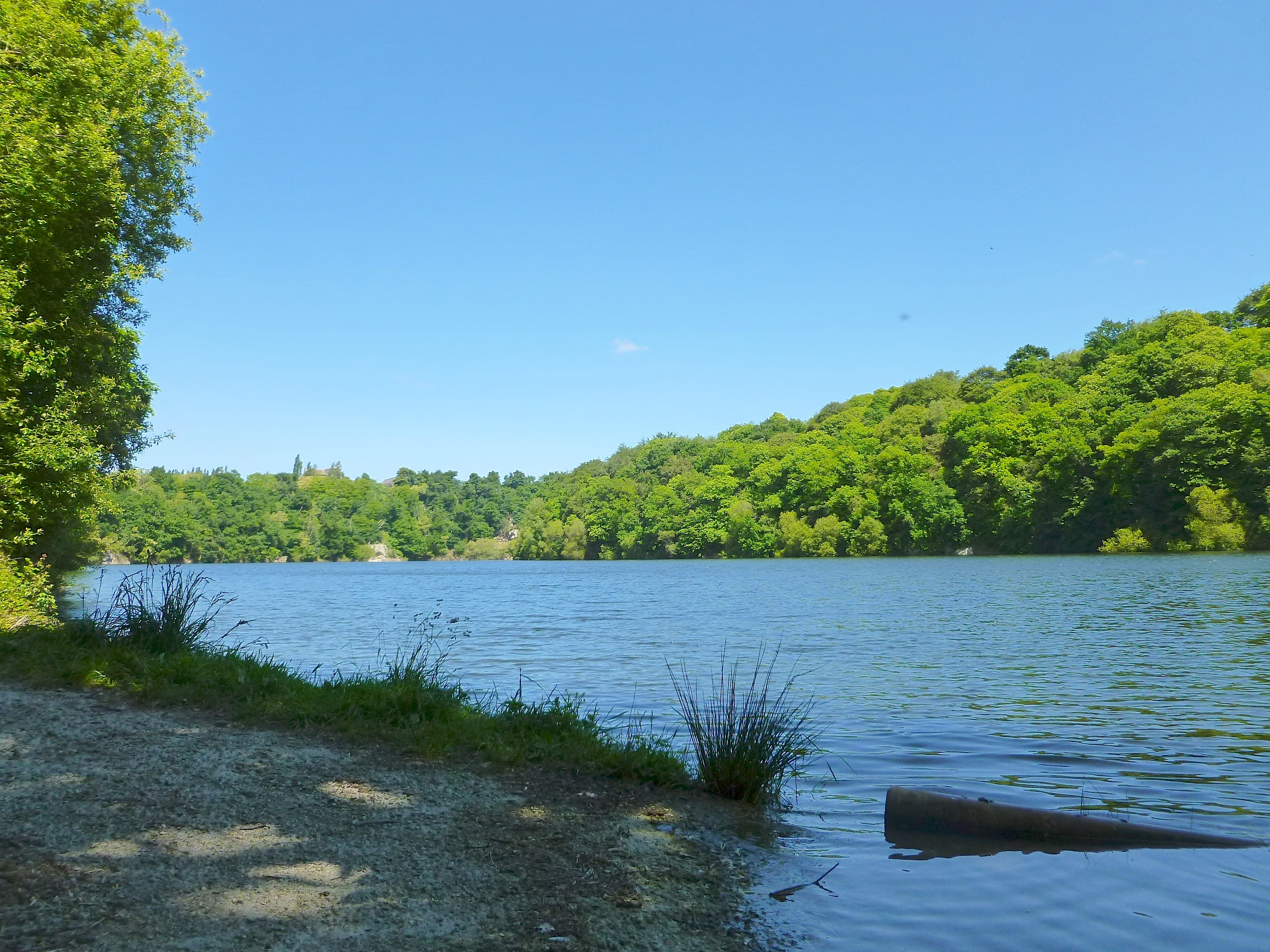
- Lac d'Arguenon
- Location of Pléven
- Location within France Location within Brittany
- Coordinates: 48°29′27″N 2°19′09″W
- Country: France
- Region: Brittany
- Department: Côtes-d'Armor
- Arrondissement: Dinan
- Canton: Plancoët
- Commune: Val-d'Arguenon
- Area^{1}: 9.73 km^{2} (3.76 sq mi)
- Highest elevation: 107 m (351 ft)
- Lowest elevation: 7 m (23 ft)
- Population (2023): 610
  - Density: 63/km^{2} (160/sq mi)
- Time zone: UTC+01:00 (CET)
  - Summer (DST): UTC+02:00 (CEST)
- Postal code: 22130
- ^{1} French Land Register data, which excludes lakes, ponds, glaciers > 1 km^{2} (0.386 sq mi or 247 acres) and river estuaries.

Pléven (French pronunciation: [plevɛ̃]; Breton: Pleven) is a former commune in the Côtes-d'Armor department of Brittany in northwestern France, 70 km north west of Rennes. It was merged with Pluduno to form Val-d'Arguenon on 1 January 2025. Inhabitants of Pléven are called plévennais in French.

The Arguenon river flows through the commune.

== Notable buildings ==
The parish church is dedicated to St Pierre.

The Manoir du Vaumadeuc dates from the 15th century, and was built by Madeuc, lord of Guémadeuc. In the 18th century it was acquired by Joseph-Marie-François de Talhouèt, Comte de Sévérac. After the French Revolution, François Tresvaux du Fraval, a Priest Canon of Paris, had his library at the Manor. In the 20th century the Manor passed to the family of the Vicomte de Pontbriand.

There is a small museum dedicated to the history of wooden clog making (Musee due sabotier).

== See also ==
- Communes of the Côtes-d'Armor department
