= Bourseul =

Bourseul Boursaout
- Commune
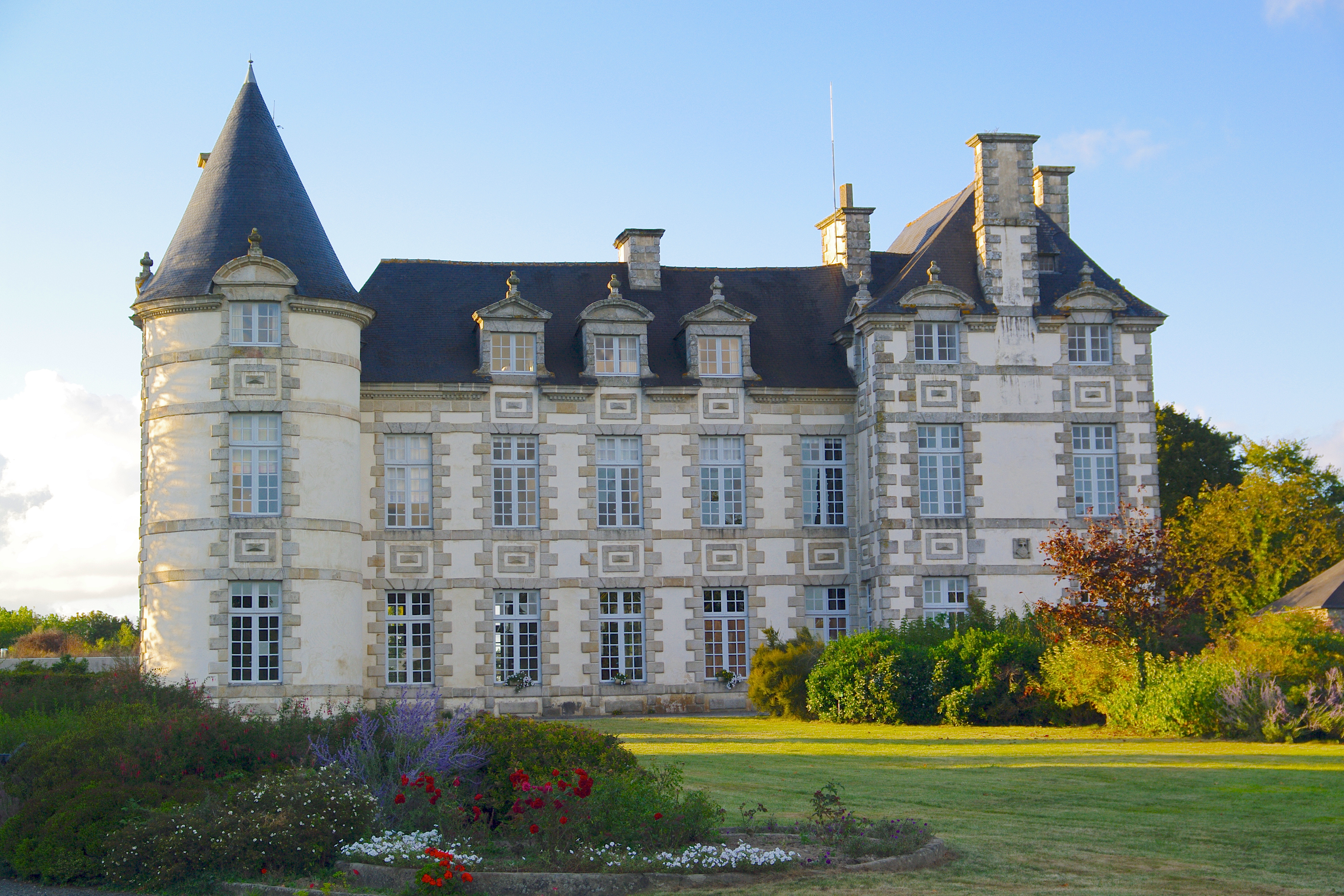
- Chateau Beaubois

- Coat of arms
- Location of Bourseul
- Location within France Location within Brittany
- Coordinates: 48°29′17″N 2°15′30″W
- Country: France
- Region: Brittany
- Department: Côtes-d'Armor
- Arrondissement: Dinan
- Canton: Plancoët
- Intercommunality: Dinan Agglomération

Government
  - Mayor (2020–2026): Philippe Dauly
- Area^{1}: 22.23 km^{2} (8.58 sq mi)
- Highest elevation: 121 m (397 ft)
- Lowest elevation: 5 m (16 ft)
- Population (2023): 1,277
  - Density: 57.44/km^{2} (148.8/sq mi)
- Time zone: UTC+01:00 (CET)
  - Summer (DST): UTC+02:00 (CEST)
- INSEE/Postal code: 22014 /22130
- ^{1} French Land Register data, which excludes lakes, ponds, glaciers > 1 km^{2} (0.386 sq mi or 247 acres) and river estuaries.

Bourseul (French pronunciation: [buʁsœl]; Breton: Boursaout; Gallo: Bórsoeut) is a commune in the Côtes-d'Armor department of Brittany in north-western France.

The Arguenon river flows through the commune.

== Population ==
Historical population
Year	Pop.	±% p.a.
1968	1,006	—
1975	893	−1.69%
1982	951	+0.90%
1990	947	−0.05%
1999	921	−0.31%
2007	1,022	+1.31%
2012	1,123	+1.90%
2017	1,141	+0.32%
2023	1,277	+1.89%
Source: INSEE

Inhabitants of Bourseul are called Bourseulais in French.

== See also ==
- Communes of the Côtes-d'Armor department
