= Créhen =

Créhen Krehen
- Commune
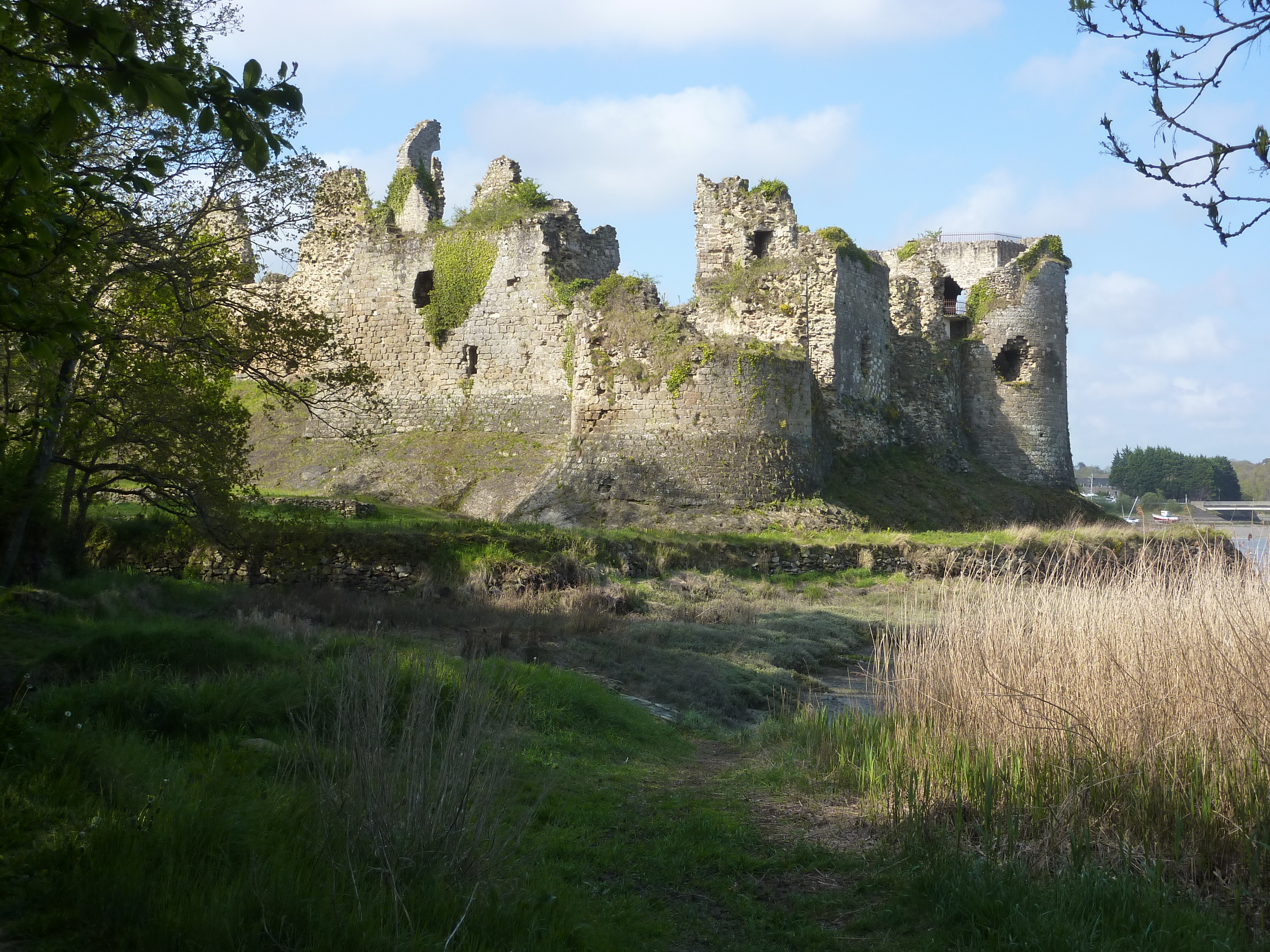
- Chateau of Le Guildo

- Coat of arms
- Location of Créhen
- Location within France Location within Brittany
- Coordinates: 48°32′47″N 2°12′43″W
- Country: France
- Region: Brittany
- Department: Côtes-d'Armor
- Arrondissement: Dinan
- Canton: Plancoët
- Intercommunality: Dinan Agglomération

Government
  - Mayor (2020–2026): Marie-Christine Cotin
- Area^{1}: 18.21 km^{2} (7.03 sq mi)
- Highest elevation: 87 m (285 ft)
- Lowest elevation: 0 m (0 ft)
- Population (2023): 1,671
  - Density: 91.76/km^{2} (237.7/sq mi)
- Time zone: UTC+01:00 (CET)
  - Summer (DST): UTC+02:00 (CEST)
- INSEE/Postal code: 22049 /22130
- ^{1} French Land Register data, which excludes lakes, ponds, glaciers > 1 km^{2} (0.386 sq mi or 247 acres) and river estuaries.

Créhen (French pronunciation: [kʁeɛ̃]; Breton: Krehen; Gallo: Qerhen) is a commune in the Côtes-d'Armor department of Brittany in northwestern France.

The Arguenon river flows through the commune.

== Population ==
Historical population
Year	Pop.	±% p.a.
1968	1,300	—
1975	1,318	+0.20%
1982	1,452	+1.39%
1990	1,493	+0.35%
1999	1,479	−0.10%
2007	1,645	+1.34%
2012	1,711	+0.79%
2017	1,640	−0.84%
2023	1,671	+0.31%
Source: INSEE

The inhabitants of Créhen are known in French as créhennais.

== See also ==
- Communes of the Côtes-d'Armor department
