= Plédéliac =

Plédéliac Pledeliav
- Commune
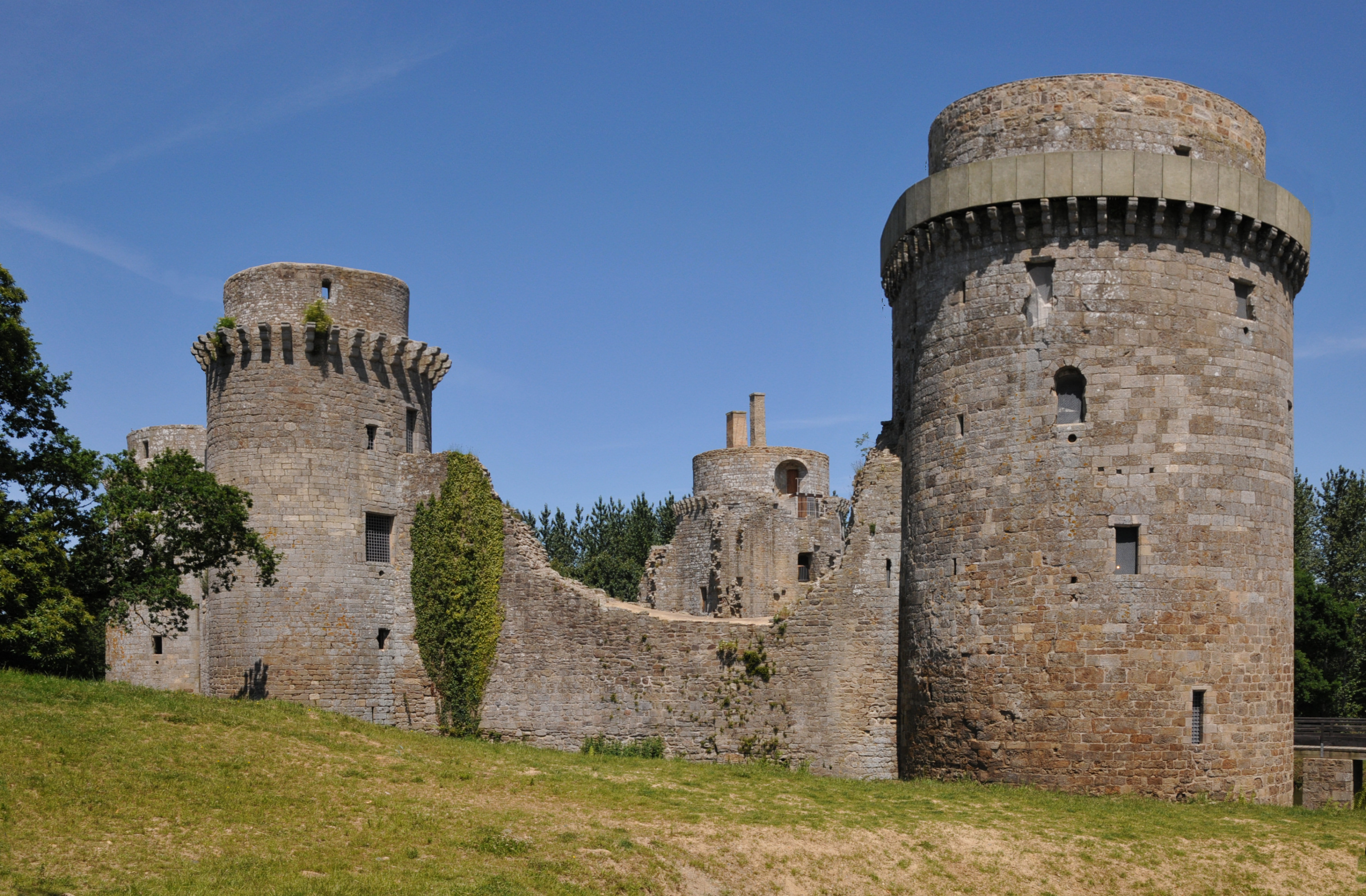
- Chateau of la Hunaudaye
- Location of Plédéliac
- Location within France Location within Brittany
- Coordinates: 48°27′00″N 2°23′12″W
- Country: France
- Region: Brittany
- Department: Côtes-d'Armor
- Arrondissement: Saint-Brieuc
- Canton: Plénée-Jugon
- Intercommunality: CA Lamballe Terre et Mer

Government
  - Mayor (2020–2026): Michel Vimont
- Area^{1}: 51.75 km^{2} (19.98 sq mi)
- Highest elevation: 111 m (364 ft)
- Lowest elevation: 17 m (56 ft)
- Population (2023): 1,662
  - Density: 32.12/km^{2} (83.18/sq mi)
- Time zone: UTC+01:00 (CET)
  - Summer (DST): UTC+02:00 (CEST)
- INSEE/Postal code: 22175 /22270
- ^{1} French Land Register data, which excludes lakes, ponds, glaciers > 1 km^{2} (0.386 sq mi or 247 acres) and river estuaries.

Plédéliac (French pronunciation: [pledeljak]; Breton: Pledeliav; Gallo: Plédéliau) is a commune in the Côtes-d'Armor department of Brittany in northwestern France.

The Arguenon river flows through the commune.

== Population ==
Historical population
Year	Pop.	±% p.a.
1968	1,390	—
1975	1,336	−0.56%
1982	1,300	−0.39%
1990	1,232	−0.67%
1999	1,238	+0.05%
2007	1,258	+0.20%
2012	1,318	+0.94%
2017	1,439	+1.77%
2023	1,662	+2.43%
Source: INSEE

Inhabitants of Plédéliac are called plédéliacais in French.

== See also ==
- Communes of the Côtes-d'Armor department
