= Corseul =

Corseul Kersaout
- Commune
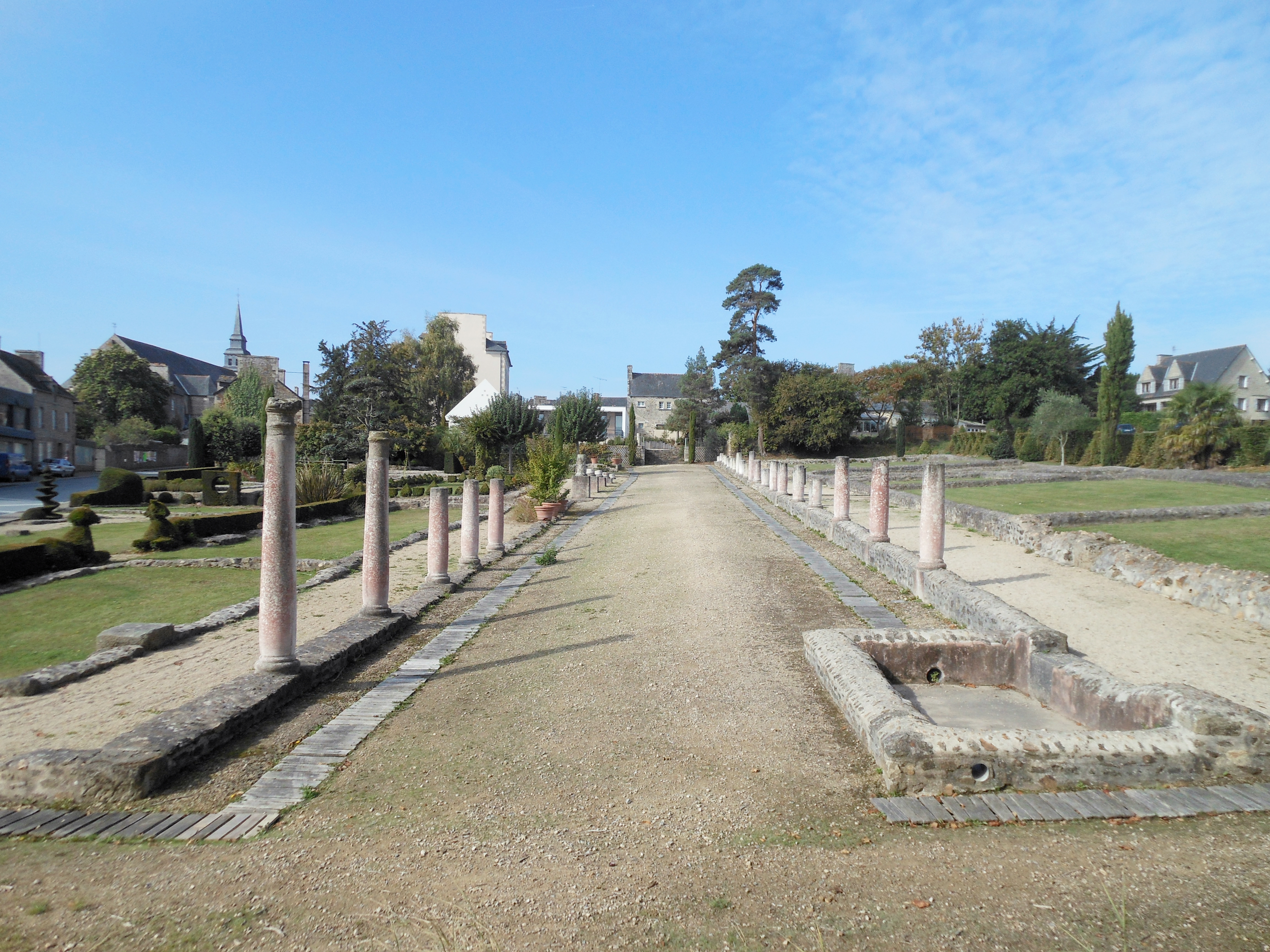
- Roman ruins

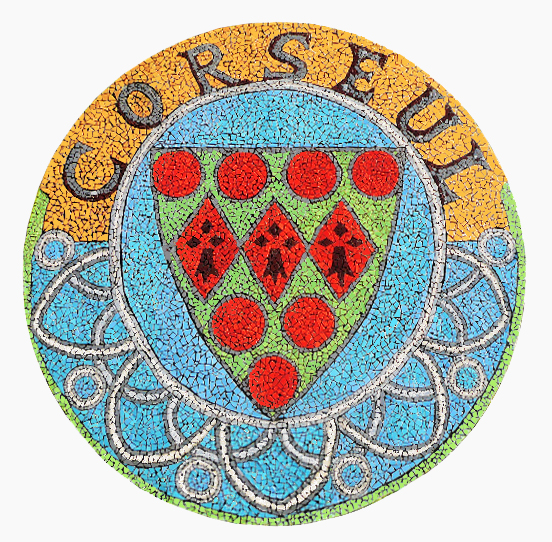
- Coat of arms
- Location of Corseul
- Location within France Location within Brittany
- Coordinates: 48°28′57″N 2°10′08″W
- Country: France
- Region: Brittany
- Department: Côtes-d'Armor
- Arrondissement: Dinan
- Canton: Plancoët
- Intercommunality: Dinan Agglomération

Government
  - Mayor (2020–2026): Alain Jan
- Area^{1}: 41.74 km^{2} (16.12 sq mi)
- Highest elevation: 126 m (413 ft)
- Lowest elevation: 13 m (43 ft)
- Population (2023): 2,331
  - Density: 55.85/km^{2} (144.6/sq mi)
- Time zone: UTC+01:00 (CET)
  - Summer (DST): UTC+02:00 (CEST)
- INSEE/Postal code: 22048 /22130
- ^{1} French Land Register data, which excludes lakes, ponds, glaciers > 1 km^{2} (0.386 sq mi or 247 acres) and river estuaries.

Corseul (French pronunciation: [kɔʁsœl]; Breton: Kersaout; Gallo: Corsoeut) is a commune in the Côtes-d'Armor department of Brittany in northwestern France.

The town was a major Roman town and contains Roman ruins. The town hall contains a small archaeological museum.

== History ==
Corseul was called Fanum Martis ("Temple of Mars") in Latin and was the capital of the Gallo-Roman province of Coriosolites. It was founded in 10 BC. In the 3rd and 4th centuries, like many other cities, Fanum Martis was renamed for its people, the Curiosolitae. This name change occurred as the Roman Empire weakened and paralleled a revival of the ancient Gallic gods in local religious sculptures and dedicatory inscriptions.

Some 1.5 kilometres to the southeast, at Haut-Bécherel, stand the prominent remains of an extensive Roman temple sanctuary, built at the time of Nero and Vespasian.

== Population ==
Inhabitants of Corseul are called coriosolites or curiosolites in French.

Historical population
Year	Pop.	±% p.a.
1968	1,925	—
1975	1,955	+0.22%
1982	2,022	+0.48%
1990	1,987	−0.22%
1999	1,977	−0.06%
2007	1,937	−0.26%
2012	2,085	+1.48%
2017	2,184	+0.93%
2023	2,331	+1.09%
Source: INSEE

== See also ==
- Communes of the Côtes-d'Armor department
