= Landébia =

Landébia Landebiav
- Commune
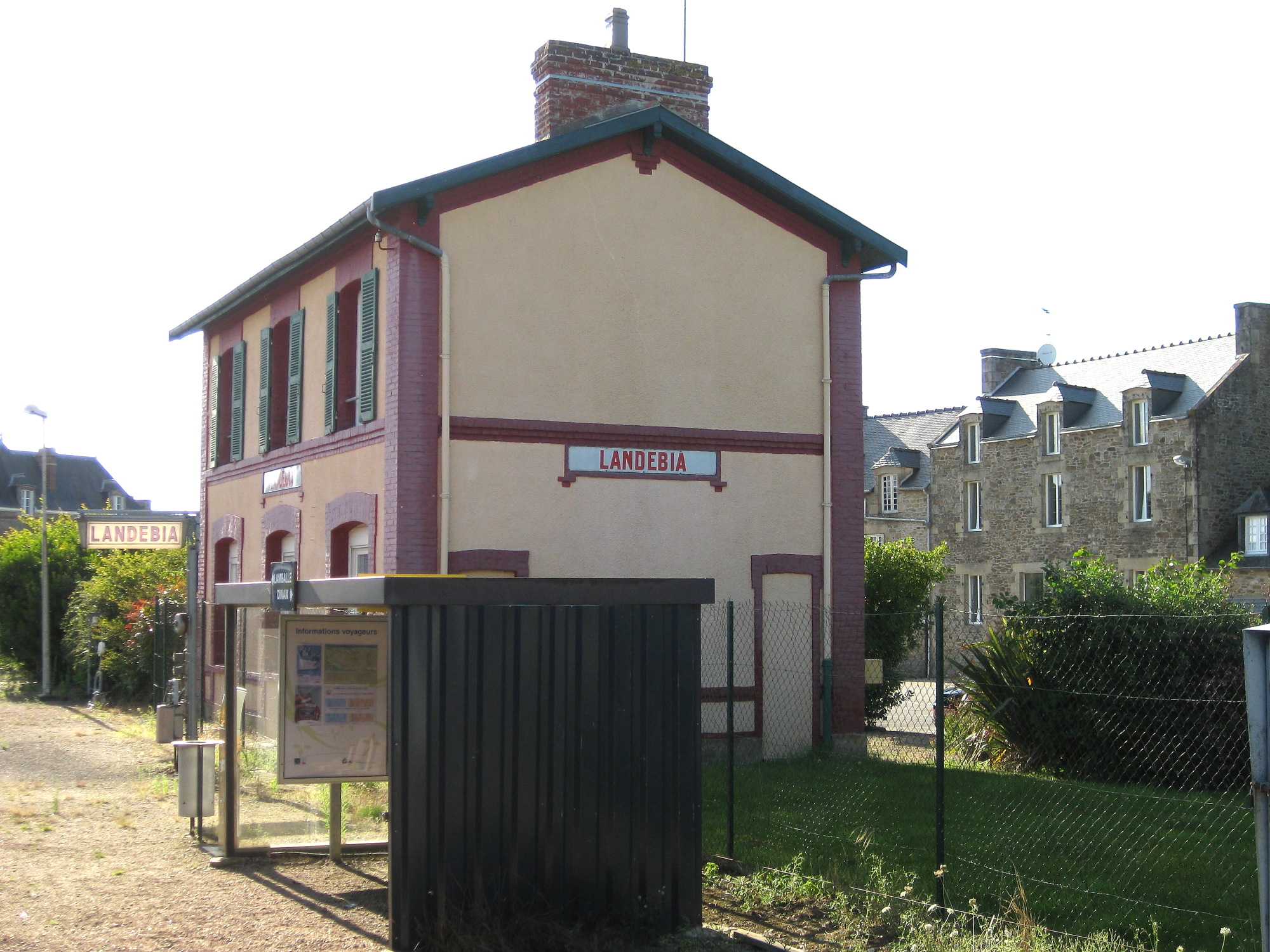
- Train station
- Location of Landébia
- Location within France Location within Brittany
- Coordinates: 48°30′54″N 2°20′06″W
- Country: France
- Region: Brittany
- Department: Côtes-d'Armor
- Arrondissement: Dinan
- Canton: Plancoët
- Intercommunality: Dinan Agglomération

Government
  - Mayor (2020–2026): Patrick Durand
- Area^{1}: 3.55 km^{2} (1.37 sq mi)
- Highest elevation: 83 m (272 ft)
- Lowest elevation: 48 m (157 ft)
- Population (2023): 461
  - Density: 130/km^{2} (336/sq mi)
- Time zone: UTC+01:00 (CET)
  - Summer (DST): UTC+02:00 (CEST)
- INSEE/Postal code: 22096 /22130
- ^{1} French Land Register data, which excludes lakes, ponds, glaciers > 1 km^{2} (0.386 sq mi or 247 acres) and river estuaries.

Landébia (French pronunciation: [lɑ̃debja]; Breton: Landebiav) is a commune in the Côtes-d'Armor department of Brittany in northwestern France.

== Population ==
Historical population
Year	Pop.	±% p.a.
1968	357	—
1975	434	+2.83%
1982	486	+1.63%
1990	447	−1.04%
1999	427	−0.51%
2007	444	+0.49%
2012	494	+2.16%
2017	481	−0.53%
2023	461	−0.71%
Source: INSEE

== See also ==
- Communes of the Côtes-d'Armor department
