= Saint-Maudez =

Saint-Maudez Sant-Maodez
- Commune
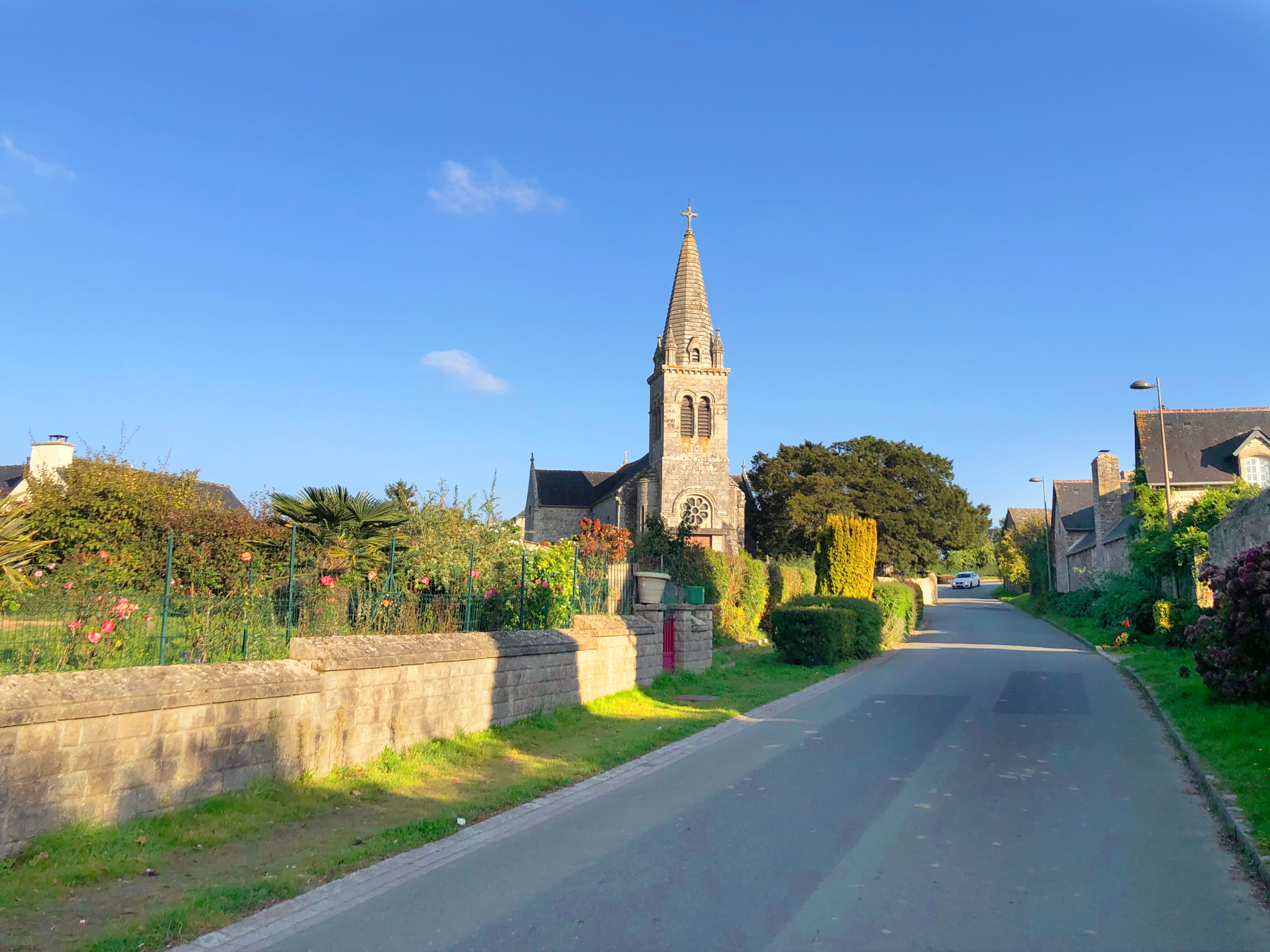
- A general view of Saint-Maudez

- Coat of arms
- Location of Saint-Maudez
- Location within France Location within Brittany
- Coordinates: 48°27′12″N 2°10′52″W
- Country: France
- Region: Brittany
- Department: Côtes-d'Armor
- Arrondissement: Dinan
- Canton: Plancoët
- Intercommunality: Dinan Agglomération

Government
  - Mayor (2020–2026): Fabrice Rivallan
- Area^{1}: 5.09 km^{2} (1.97 sq mi)
- Highest elevation: 104 m (341 ft)
- Lowest elevation: 39 m (128 ft)
- Population (2023): 286
  - Density: 56.2/km^{2} (146/sq mi)
- Time zone: UTC+01:00 (CET)
  - Summer (DST): UTC+02:00 (CEST)
- INSEE/Postal code: 22315 /22980
- ^{1} French Land Register data, which excludes lakes, ponds, glaciers > 1 km^{2} (0.386 sq mi or 247 acres) and river estuaries.

Saint-Maudez (French pronunciation: [sɛ̃ mode]; Breton: Sant-Maodez) is a commune in the Côtes-d'Armor department of Brittany in northwestern France. It is named after the Breton Saint Maudez.

== History ==
St. Maudez is the tenth son of the King of Ireland Erelus (or Erelea or Ardea) and Gentuse or Getive, his wife. Saint-Maudez landed in Brittany, around 528, not far from Dol, with his sister Saint Juvette and two disciples, Saint Botmel and Saint Tudy.

== Heraldic ==
Blazon = Carved: 1st of silver sown with shadows of ermine speckles with a line of azure, a lion gules crowned with gold debruising, 2nd of azure sown shadows of ermine speckles and at Saint Maudet bypassed halo issuant from the point and holding his episcopal crozier, all in shadow with the silver line.

== Population ==
Historical population
Year	Pop.	±% p.a.
1968	236	—
1975	229	−0.43%
1982	207	−1.43%
1990	222	+0.88%
1999	226	+0.20%
2007	265	+2.01%
2012	307	+2.99%
2017	284	−1.55%
2023	286	+0.12%
Source: INSEE

Inhabitants of Saint-Maudez are called maudéziens in French.

== Places and monuments ==
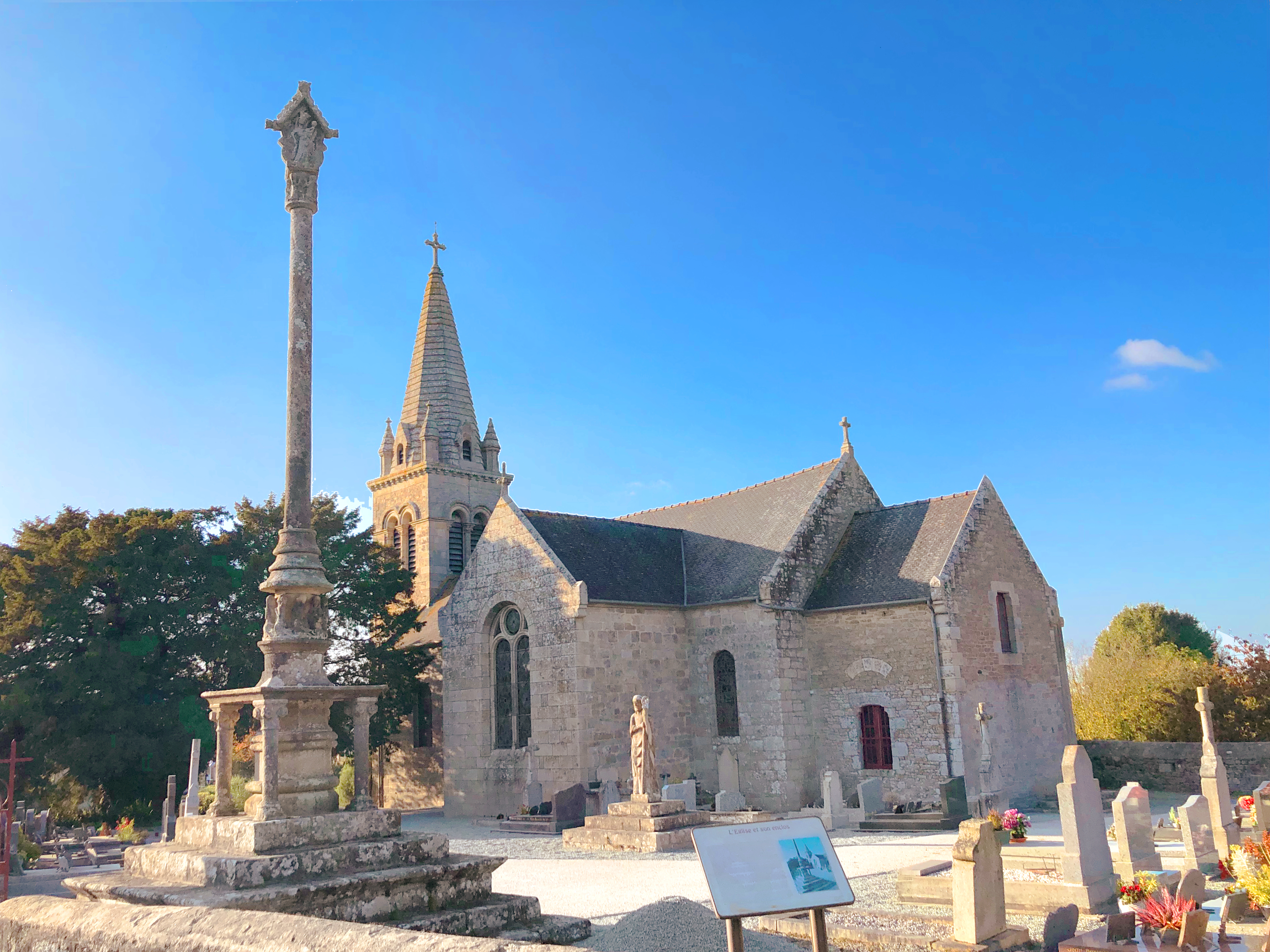
- The church Saint-Maudez, the millennial yew, its parish enclosure and the cross of the Templar Knights (registered in the inventory of historical monuments on 28/10/1926 under the reference PA000896446)
- The Orrhins Crosses (see below)
- The Gouyon fountain
- The Thaumatz Castle (private)
- Many old remarkable houses
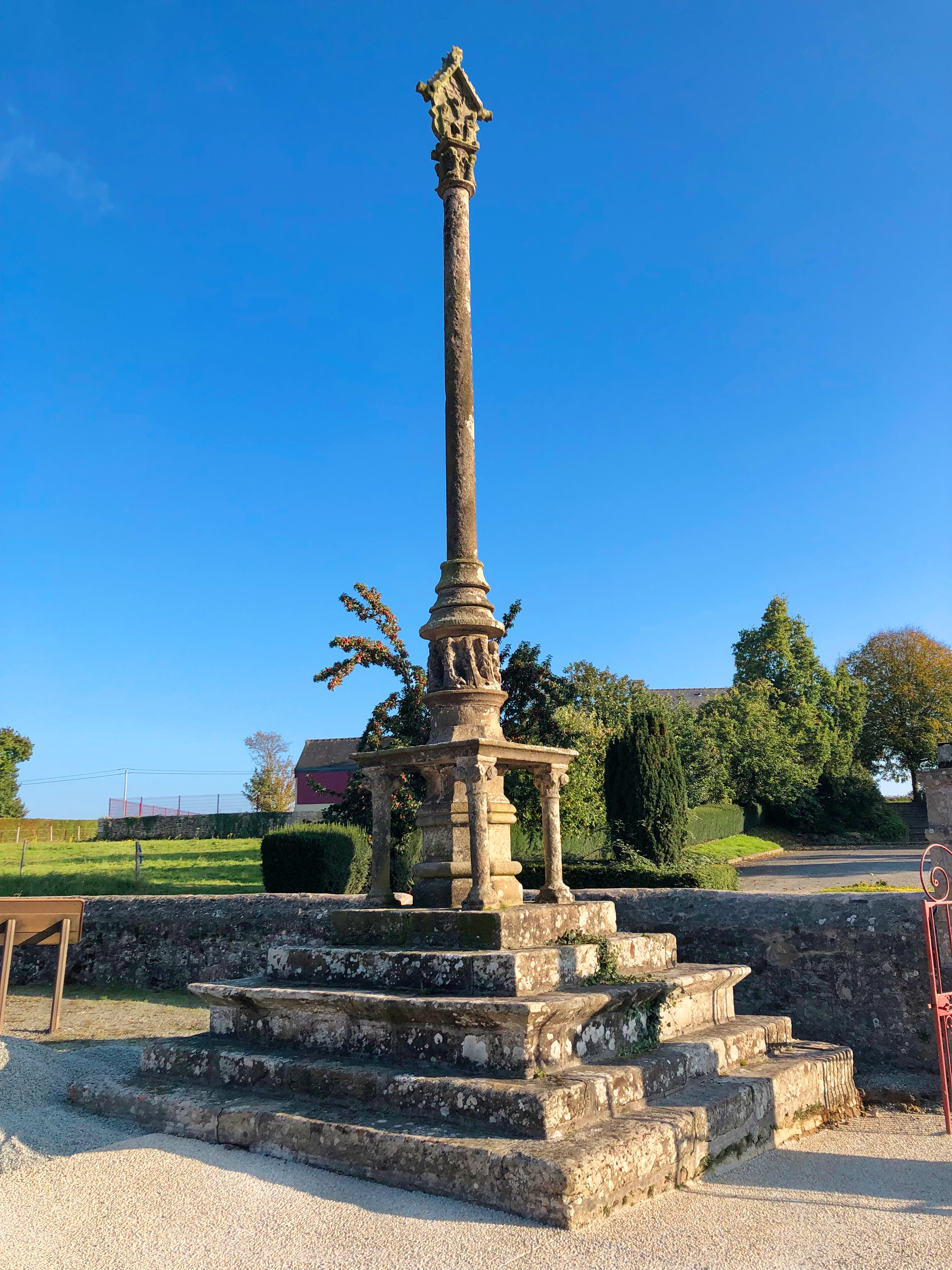
Croix St Maudez

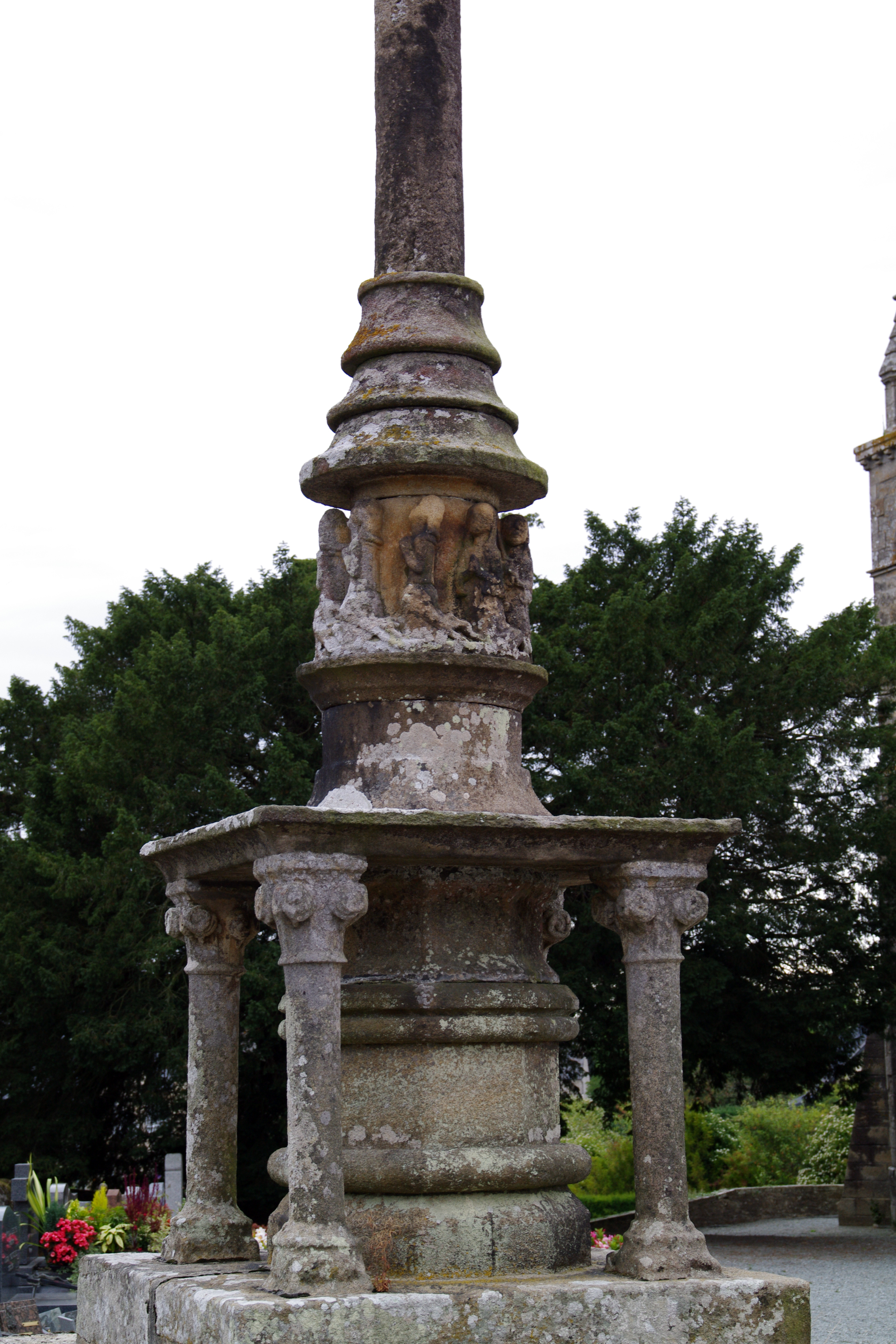
Croix St Maudez

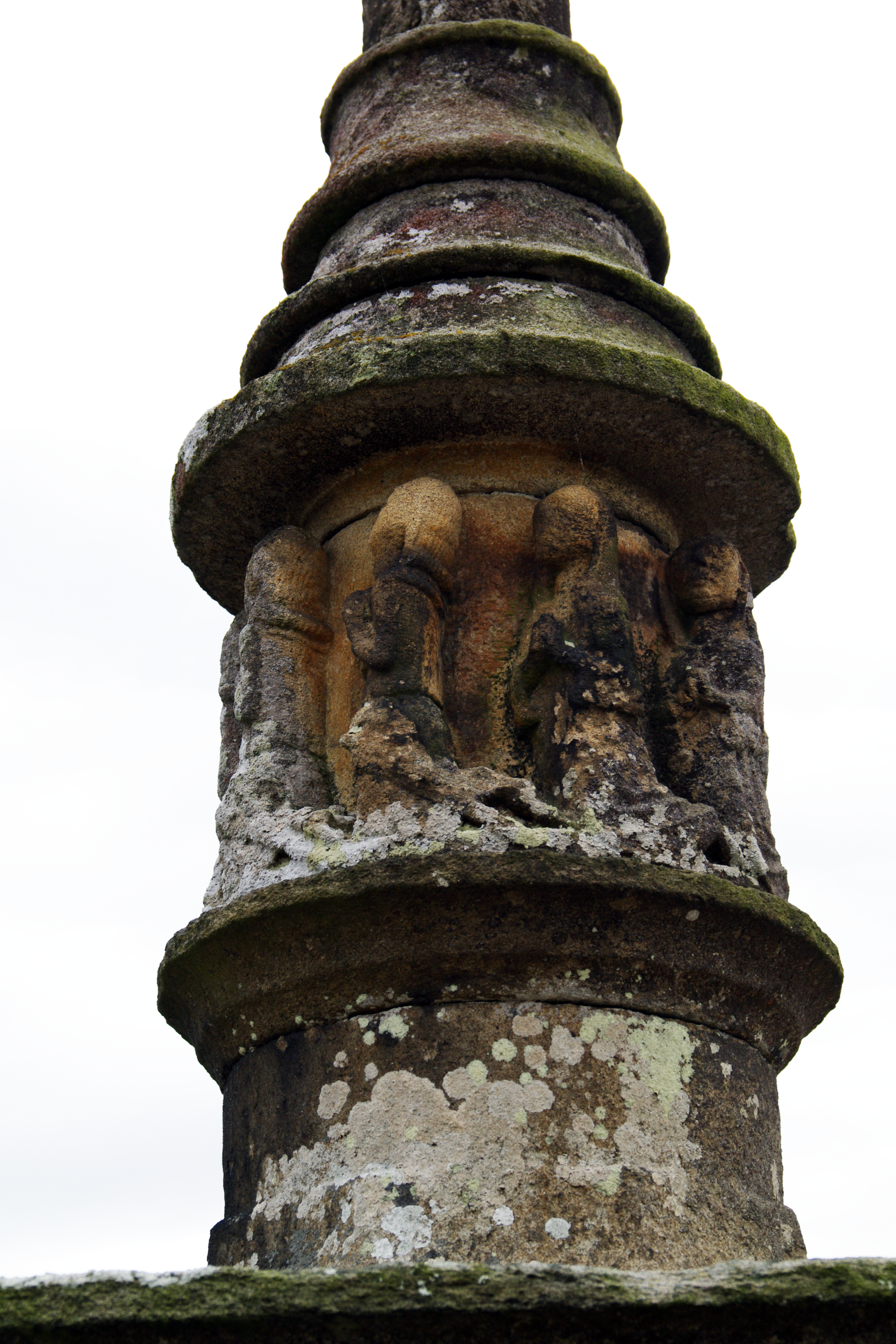
Croix St Maudez

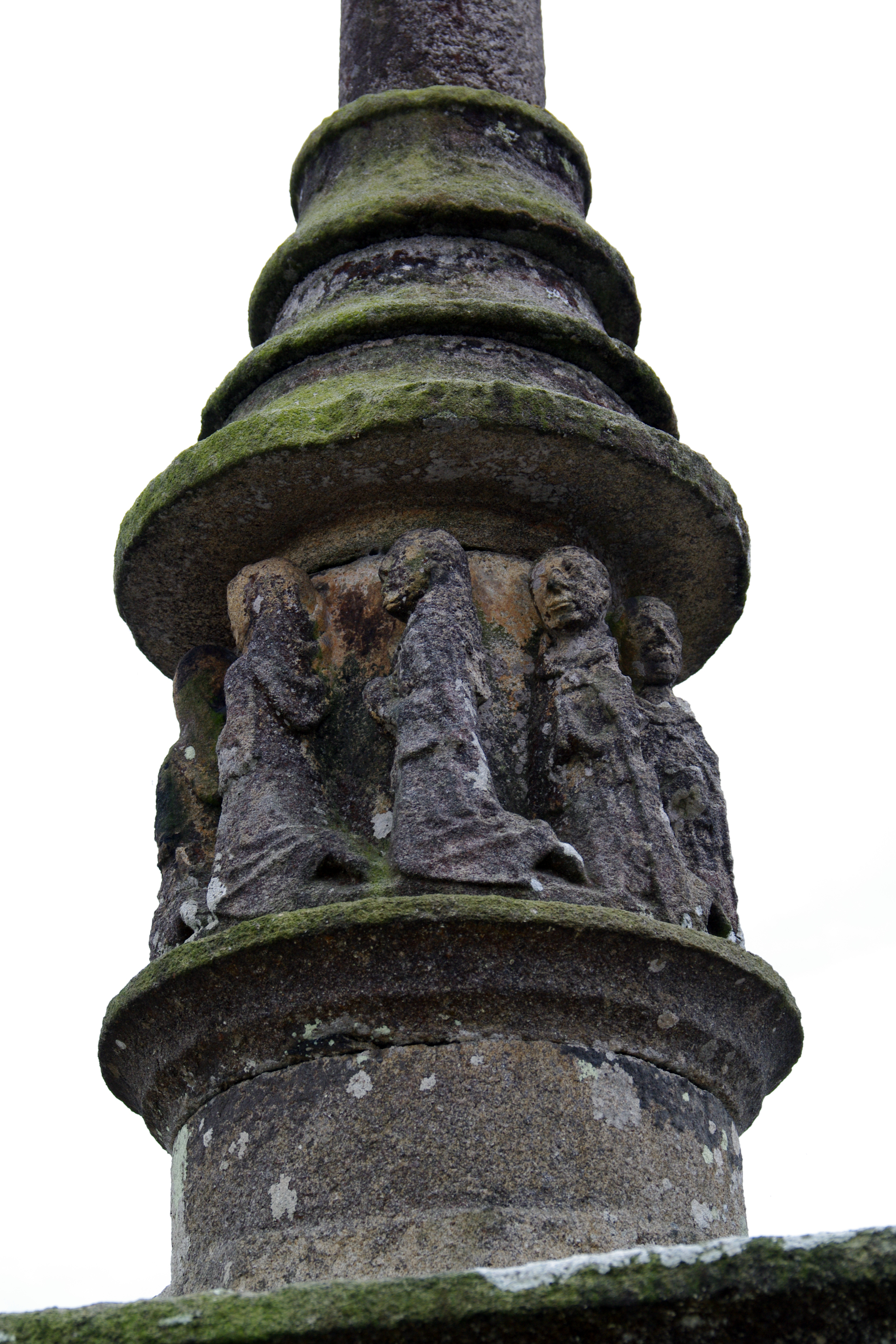
Croix St Maudez

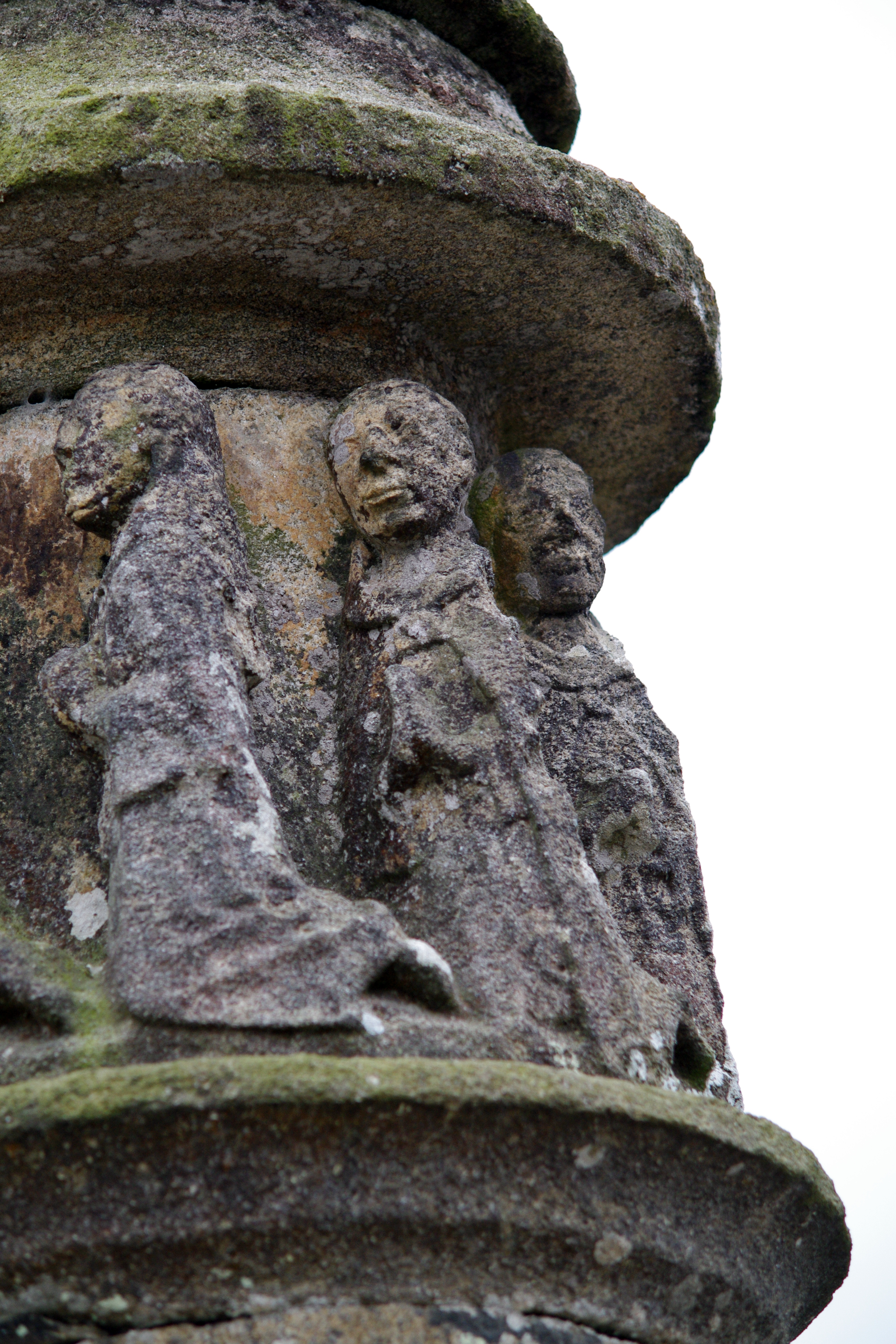
Croix St Maudez

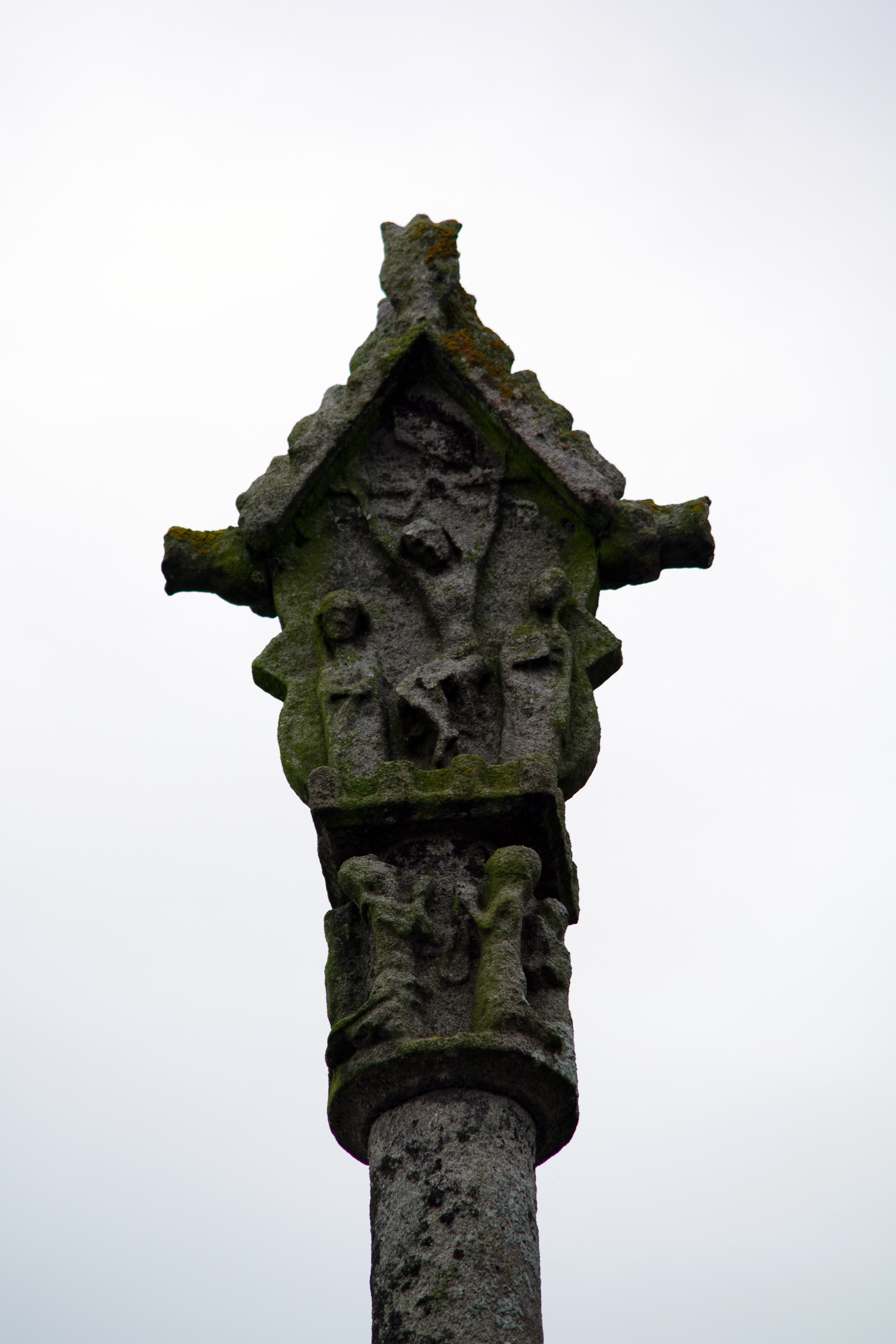
Croix St Maudez

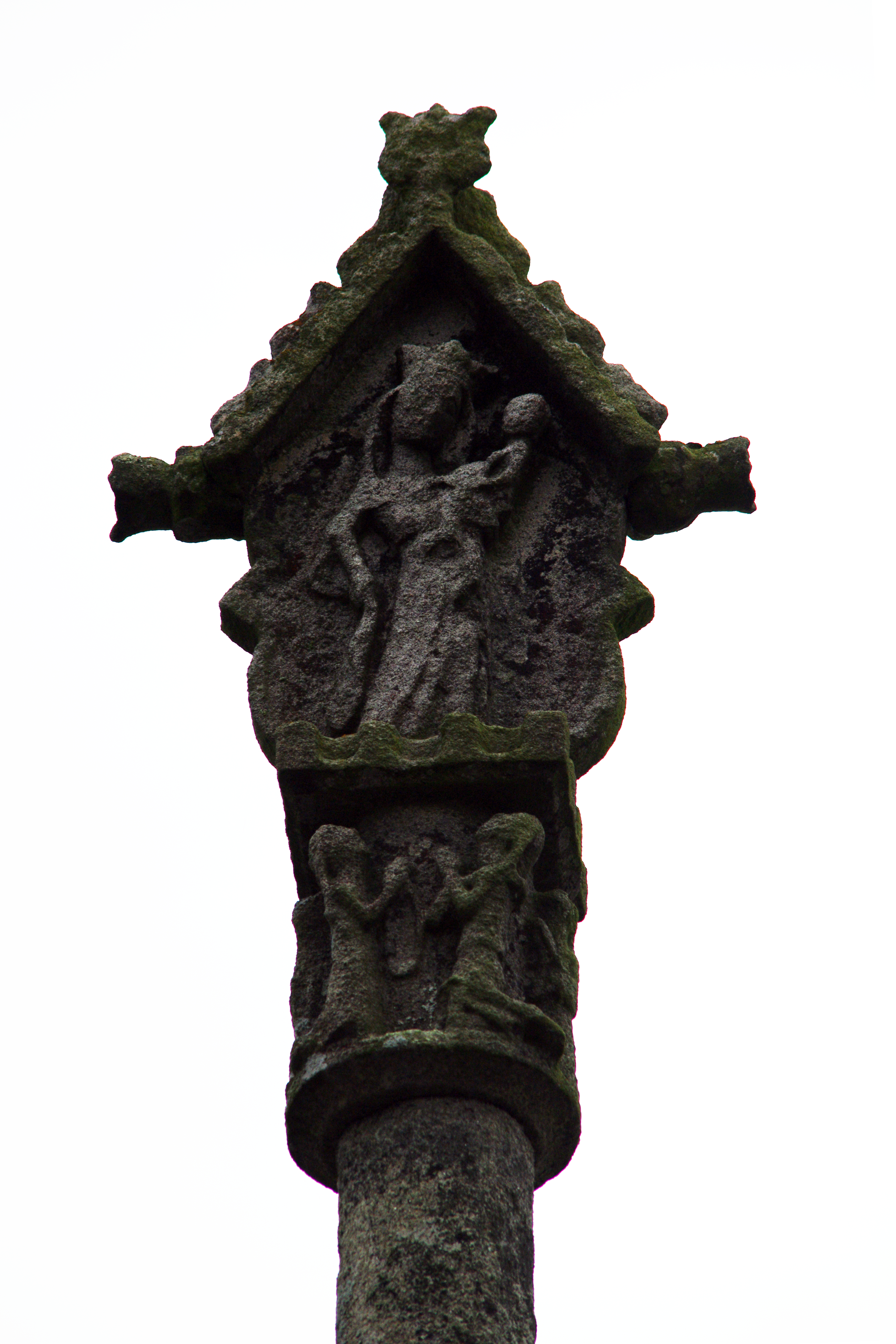
Croix St Maudez

== See also ==
- Communes of the Côtes-d'Armor department
