= Canton of Plancoët =

Coordinates: 48.52°N 2.23°W

The canton of Plancoët is an administrative division of the Côtes-d'Armor department, northwestern France. Its borders were modified at the French canton reorganisation which came into effect in March 2015. Its seat is in Plancoët.

It consists of the following communes:

1. Bourseul
2. Corseul
3. Créhen
4. Landébia
5. La Landec
6. Languédias
7. Languenan
8. Plancoët
9. Plélan-le-Petit
10. Pléven
11. Plorec-sur-Arguenon
12. Pluduno
13. Saint-Jacut-de-la-Mer
14. Saint-Lormel
15. Saint-Maudez
16. Saint-Méloir-des-Bois
17. Saint-Michel-de-Plélan
18. Trébédan
