= Plélan-le-Petit =

Plélan-le-Petit Plelann-Vihan
- Commune
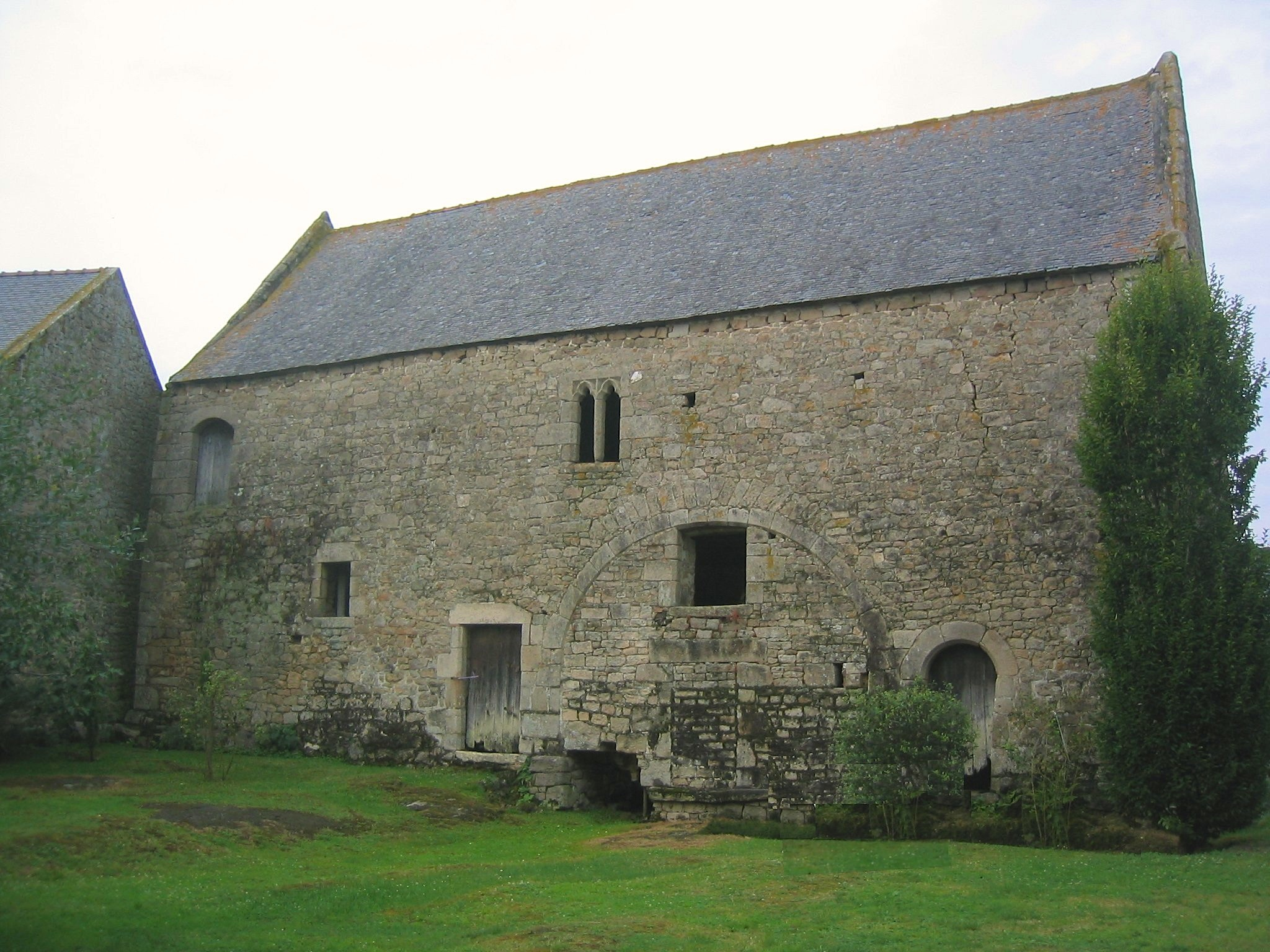
- Fossés Manor

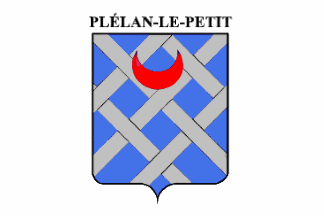
- Flag Coat of arms
- Location of Plélan-le-Petit
- Location within France Location within Brittany
- Coordinates: 48°26′05″N 2°13′07″W
- Country: France
- Region: Brittany
- Department: Côtes-d'Armor
- Arrondissement: Dinan
- Canton: Plancoët
- Intercommunality: Dinan Agglomération

Government
  - Mayor (2020–2026): Didier Miriel
- Area^{1}: 21.23 km^{2} (8.20 sq mi)
- Highest elevation: 125 m (410 ft)
- Lowest elevation: 64 m (210 ft)
- Population (2023): 1,992
  - Density: 93.83/km^{2} (243.0/sq mi)
- Time zone: UTC+01:00 (CET)
  - Summer (DST): UTC+02:00 (CEST)
- INSEE/Postal code: 22180 /22980
- ^{1} French Land Register data, which excludes lakes, ponds, glaciers > 1 km^{2} (0.386 sq mi or 247 acres) and river estuaries.

Plélan-le-Petit (French pronunciation: [plelɑ̃ lə pəti]; Breton: Plelann-Vihan; Gallo: Plélan) is a commune in the Côtes-d'Armor department of Brittany in northwestern France.

== Population ==
Historical population
Year	Pop.	±% p.a.
1968	1,127	—
1975	1,268	+1.70%
1982	1,364	+1.05%
1990	1,525	+1.40%
1999	1,505	−0.15%
2007	1,660	+1.23%
2012	1,805	+1.69%
2017	1,910	+1.14%
2023	1,992	+0.70%
Source: INSEE

Inhabitants of Plélan-le-Petit are called plélanais in French.

== See also ==
- Communes of the Côtes-d'Armor department
