= Basilica of Saint-Sauveur (Dinan) =

Roman Catholic religious building in Dinan, France

- Basilique Saint-Sauveur de Dinan
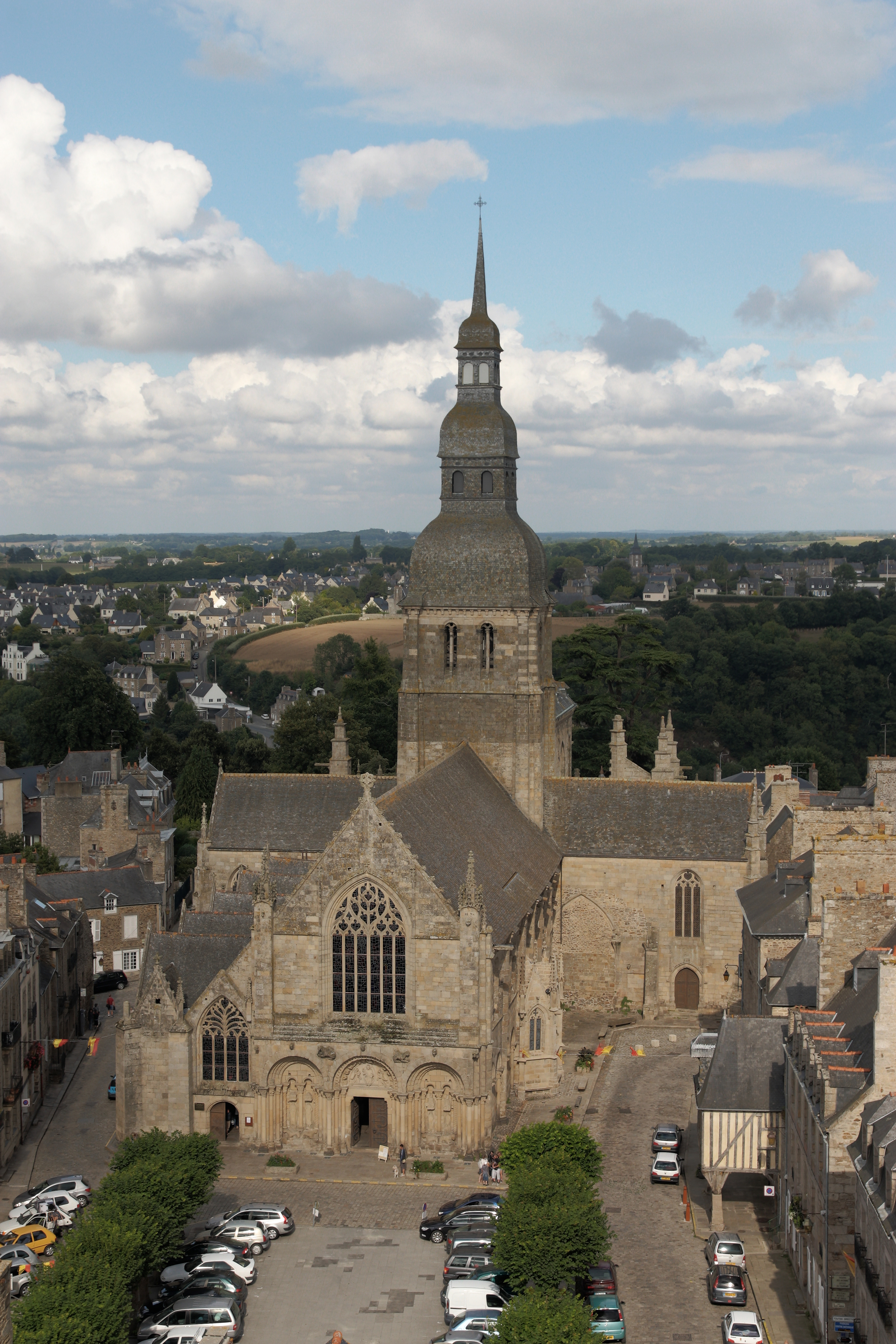
- Interactive map of the Basilica of Saint-Sauveur (Dinan) area

General information
- Type: Minor basilica
- Architectural style: Romanesque and Gothic.
- Location: Place Saint-Sauveur, Dinan commune, Côtes-d'Armor department, Brittany region., France
- Coordinates: 48°27′12″N 2°2′30″W
- Owner: Municipality of the Dinan commune

Design and construction
- Awards: Monument historique (1862)
- Designations: Adscribed to the Roman Catholic Diocese of Saint-Brieuc jurisdiction from the Catholic Church confession

Website
- https://www.communautepastorale-dinan.catholique.fr/

The Basilica of Saint-Sauveur de Dinan is a Roman Catholic church situated in Dinan, France. Historically, it is one of the two parish churches in the town, the other being Saint Malo's church.

The building's initial constructions date back to the 11th century. Following a reconstruction campaign initiated in 1480, a northern aisle was added to the nave, and the apse and transept were entirely rebuilt. The façade's upper parts were also reconstructed. Due to an interruption, only the southern nave wall and lower façade remain from the Romanesque church.

This reconstruction effort evidences the town's dynamism at the end of the Middle Ages. The decoration of the radiating chapels is a testament to the fusion of Gothic and Renaissance styles in Brittany during the early 16th century. The collapse of the bell tower in 1547 prompted changes to the church. As a result, the decision was made to not vault the choir, which was instead covered by a panelled roof.

The church also became a site of Marian devotion due to the presence of Notre-Dame-des-Vertus, a 15th-century bas-relief formerly housed in the Cordeliers convent in town. Local veneration of this depiction of the Assumption of the Virgin led to the building being designated a basilica minor by Pope Pius XII on May 23, 1954.

In addition to this, the building also has an abundance of furnishings, which includes a cenotaph containing the heart of Bertrand du Guesclin.

== Location ==
The Basilica of Saint-Sauveur in Dinan is located in the French department of Côtes-d'Armor, in the commune of Dinan, in the heart of the Secteur sauvegardé (Protected area). It overlooks the Rance river. Behind the apse is the Jardin Anglais, a former cemetery.

== History ==
=== Foundation legend ===
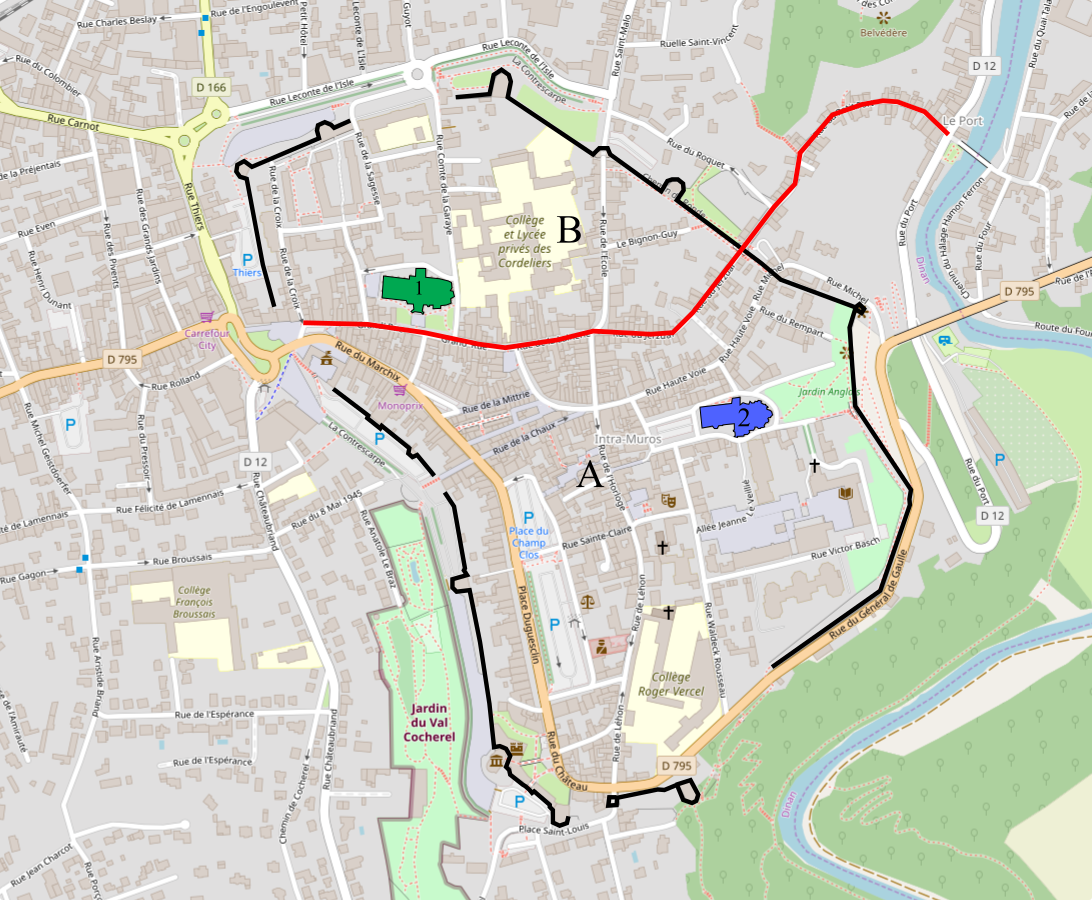
Delimitation of Dinan's parishes in the Middle Ages: 1 / Saint-Malo Church; 2 / Saint-Sauveur Church; A / Saint-Sauveur parish territory; B / Saint-Malo parish territory

Legend has it that Riwallon le Roux, the lord of Dinan, founded the priory of Saint-Sauveur de Dinan in 1112 upon his return from the Holy Land. As the story goes, the knight was taken prisoner during the First Crusade and vowed to build a church in honor of Saint-Sauveur and the Holy Trinity if he ever returned home. Riwallon was the grandson of Josselin I of Dinan, the son of Olivier I of Dinan, and the brother of Geoffroy I of Dinan. However, no surviving documentation has confirmed this tale. A charter from 1123, which established the division of the town between Olivier II and Alain de Dinan, the founder's nephews, implies that the building and its cemetery were already the property of the abbey of Saint-Jacut. Alternatively, the priory might have been granted to the abbey in 1131 by a son of Geoffroy I de Dinan. The accuracy of these claims is uncertain as ancient records have been lost, and rely solely on local tradition. From 1123 onwards, Saint-Sauveur de Dinan and Saint-Malo were the two parishes of the town. The former was dependent on Saint-Jacut Abbey and the latter on Marmoutier Abbey, both coming under the jurisdiction of the diocese of Saint-Malo. Due to conflicts of jurisdiction arising between the two churches, it was decided that Saint-Sauveur would serve the southern part of the town, situated below the Rance bridge to the Jerzual gate. On the other hand, Saint-Malo was designated to serve the northern part. The boundary corresponds to the current streets of Petite Fort, Jerzual, and Lainerie, as well as the main street. Technical term abbreviations are clarified upon first use.

=== Late medieval reconstruction ===
The 11th-century church underwent significant renovations from 1480 onwards. Builders constructed a side aisle with a row of chapels to the north of the Romanesque nave, and rebuilt the upper level of the façade. Although a side aisle was planned to the south of the nave, it was never built. Instead, a small three-sided chapel was built on the former site of a doorway in 1500.

The apse was completely rebuilt from 1507 under the guidance of Roland Bougnard, a master builder. The entire apse was likely finished circa 1547 after the crossing tower crumbled. This disaster instigated a rebuilding initiative, which involved erecting buttresses to support the high choir. After completion in 1646, these areas were topped with a panelled roof structure, which was later substituted with a false plaster vault during the 18th century.

=== Church and parish in modern times ===
In modern times, Saint-Sauveur de Dinan and Saint-Malo served a population of 5,000 to 8,000 individuals with a strong religious presence. In the 18th century, there were up to 4,000 communicants in the parish of Saint-Sauveur alone.

From the late 16th century onward, various brotherhoods emerged in the parish as part of the Catholic Reformation movement. These brotherhoods, under the patronage of saints such as Clément, Fiacre, Barbara, John the Apostle, Joseph, Crépin, Cecilia, Eligius, Laurent, Ascension, and Trinity, reached a total number of twelve by the 18th century. The Confrérie des Marchands Forains has no specific patronage. There are four devotional confraternities: one dedicated to St. Catherine, one dedicated to the Blessed Sacrament, one dedicated to the dying under the invocation of the Blessed Virgin Mary of Mount Carmel, and one dedicated to the archconfraternity of the Annunciation of the Glorious Virgin Mary. Additionally, there is a confraternity of priests honoring the Assumption and Nativity of the Virgin, which also includes a significant number of lay notables. This brotherhood has medieval roots and was established in 1411 through the merger of two previous fraternities: the Assumption brotherhood in the Saint-Sauveur parish and the Nativity of Mary brotherhood at the Hôtel-Dieu.

The building's liturgical activities are abundant and include parish services, as well as those organized by confraternities. Of these, the priest's brotherhood is the most active, providing daily sung masses with deacon and sub-deacon at the high altar. Additionally, two annual solemn masses and funeral services for deceased confreres are held.

=== The French Revolution and its aftermath ===
The church underwent a transformation during the Revolution, first becoming a Temple of Reason and then a hayloft, before being returned to its original purpose in 1801. In 1808, a storm destroyed the roof, and in 1820, a window collapsed.

In 1851–1852, architect Hippolyte Béziers-Lafosse oversaw a restoration campaign that included rebuilding the west façade and south arm openings according to the design of the original bays. Victor Ruprich-Robert continued the restoration effort from 1855 to 1864. In 1862, the building was designated a historic monument. The north transept and façade underwent restoration in 1907. In 1954, the church was bestowed the title of minor basilica to acknowledge the veneration of Notre-Dame des Vertus's relief from the Couvent des Cordeliers in the town.

=== Life in the building today ===
In 2008–2009, the southern chapel in the nave underwent restoration. Further, restoration efforts were made to the choir roofs in the first half of 2013.

In February 2019, preventive archaeological excavations were carried out on the square situated in front of the church, as well as the Jardin Anglais, as part of a project to redevelop the area. Inrap researchers made an astounding discovery of burials in the Jardin Anglais, a site known to have once served as a cemetery. The most significant find was that of a woman from the modern era buried with her rosary. Four successive occupation levels were uncovered on the Place Saint-Sauveur side. The earliest of these levels present post-holes, though there is no way to date it. Remains of a butcher's shop imply that the 15th-century covered market may have existed before its attestation. Finally, traces of a calvary attested in the 18th and 19th centuries, along with a forgotten drain, were discovered. No significant objects were found by the researchers under the forecourt, but they did reveal that the ground level was nearly one metre lower than the basilica's current threshold. This finding prompts inquiries into the basilica's history, as the level may have been elevated.

In response to the Notre-Dame de Paris fire on April 15, 2019, the basilica and its attic space underwent a fire safety inspection commissioned by the mayor.

Today, the church is a part of the parish of Dinan, encompassing the municipalities of Dinan (including the Saint-Malo church), Léhon, Aucaleuc, Quévert, Lanvallay, Saint-Solen, and Tressaint.

== Architecture ==
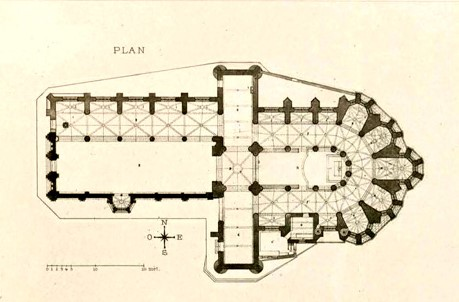
Plan of the building

The current structure of the building follows a Latin cross pattern and comprises a nave with a single aisle to the north, a projecting transept, and an apse marked by five radiating chapels.

Stylistically, the architecture of Saint-Sauveur basilica in Dinan can be categorized into two sections: a Romanesque section from the 12th century, which includes the first floor of the west façade and the south wall of the nave, and a Gothic section that covers the remaining parts of the building, such as the upper part of the west façade, the north wall of the lower side of the nave, the transept, and the apse.

=== Exterior ===
==== The façade ====
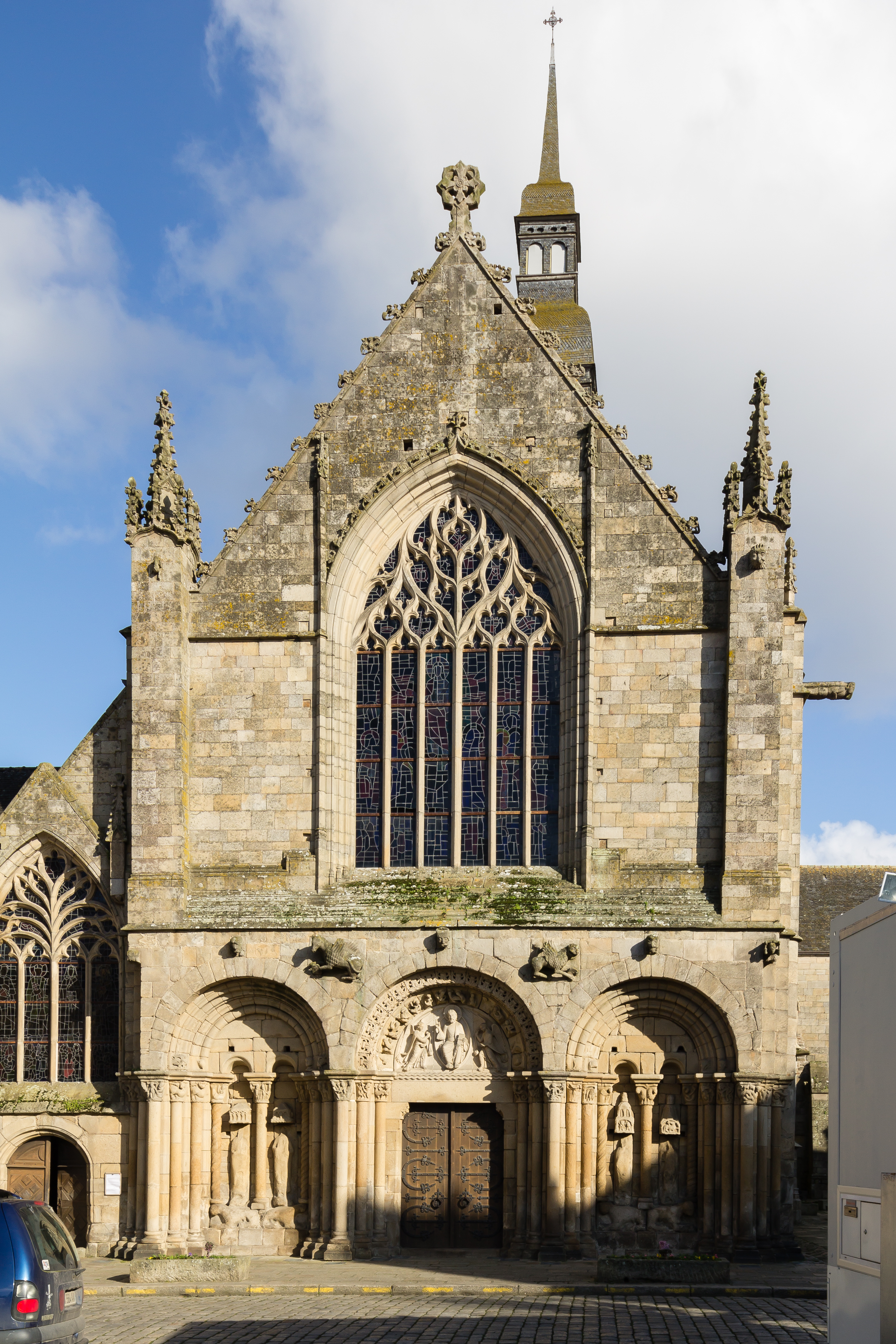
West façade

The lower sections of the façade exhibit Romanesque architecture and are strongly influenced by edifices located south of the Loire, particularly those in Poitou and Saintonge. Numerous historians have observed affinities between these sections and the churches of Église Saint-Nicolas de Civray and Église Saint-Martin de Chadenac. Some scholars also note traces of Byzantine architecture, indicating possible influence from Riwallon's engagement in the First Crusade, though this claim is contested.

The base area is separated by three curved arches, each with three voussoirs. Above the nave entrance, there is a 19th-century artistic tympanum. The first voussoir depicts the Elders of the Apocalypse and the labors of the months, while the second features stylized plant motifs with beaded ribbons that may be influenced by Byzantine styles.

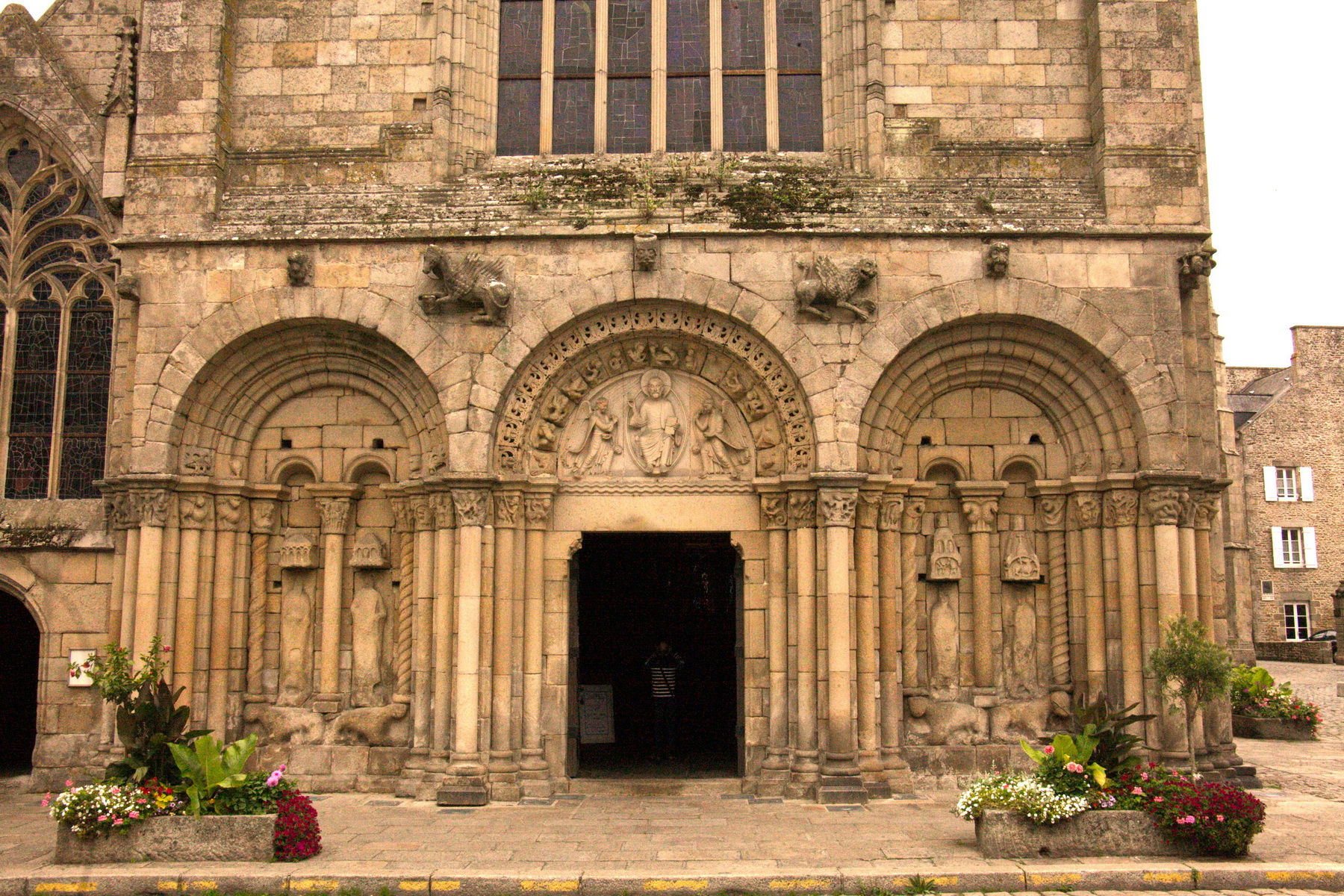
Romanesque parts of the façade.

The left and right arcades are divided into two smaller arcades, supported by twisted columns on the sides and a smooth column in the center. These four arcades contain unrecognizable statues, which are completely eroded or mutilated at an unknown time period. The columns and statues are supported by recumbent lions, which are also badly eroded.

Above the three arches, there are sculptures of an ox and a lion, both winged and holding a book, probably serving as symbols of the evangelists Mark and Luke. It is possible that these sculptures were removed from an earlier building.

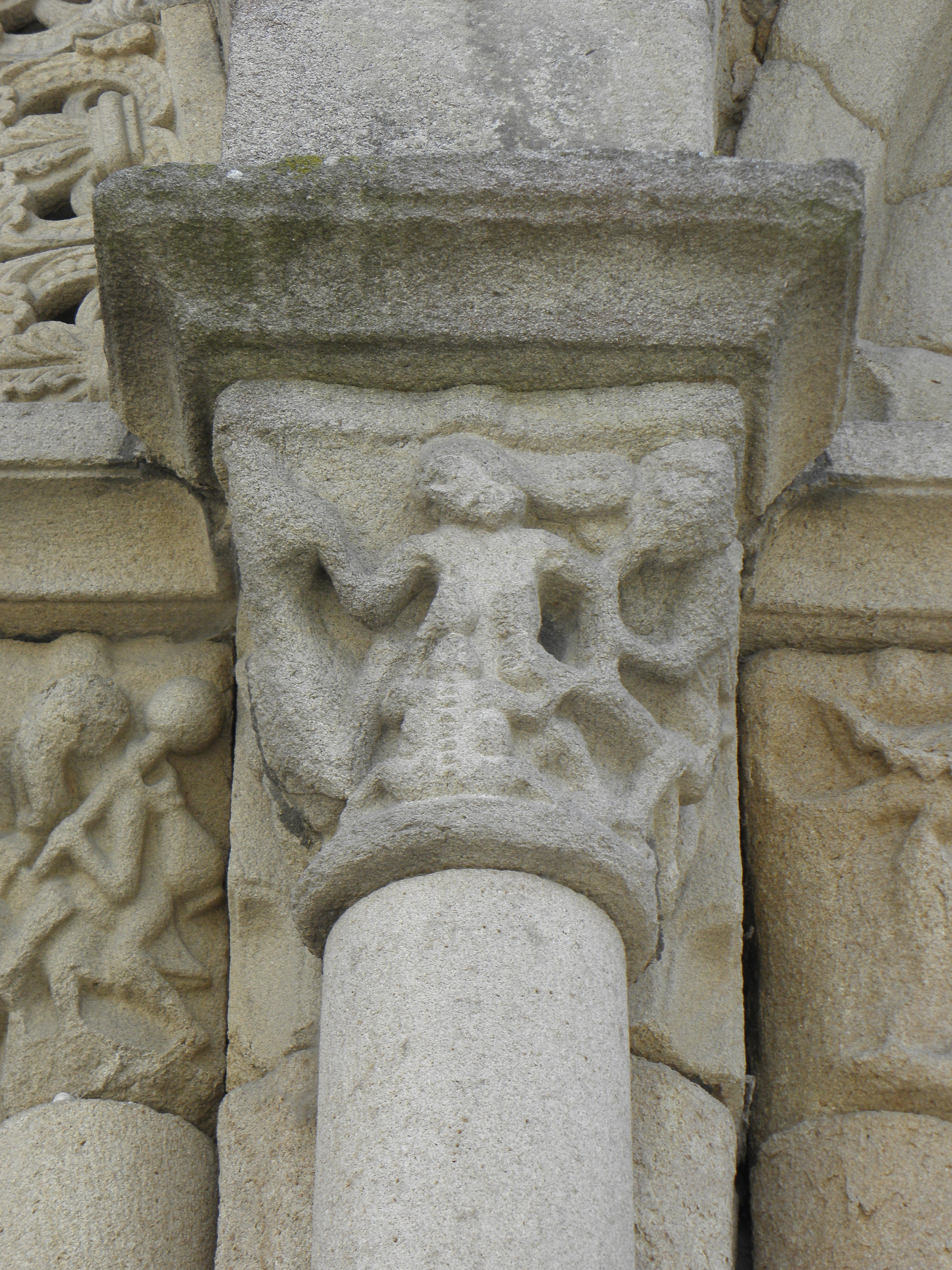
Front capital: Lust

The sculptures on the capitals of the arcades and central porch present various themes. The series of sculptures displays a scene of a proud man being devoured, followed by a pelican piercing its flank and a horned man quartered by demons. Additionally, two capitals with lions facing each other and a double-tailed mermaid are displayed in order from left to right. On the left-hand archway's other side, another series is visible, possibly portraying a hagiographic narrative that culminates in a martyrdom scene. After the installation of three contemporary sculptures, the capitals on the right arcade portray a dragon attacking a pilgrim, a depiction of lust highlighting devoured breasts, a deteriorated vegetal pattern, along with representations of animals including leaning birds, sphinxes, and confronted lions. The last series displays intertwined snakes and the punishment of the miser combined with some elements that are currently illegible. It is worth noting that the last capital on the façade has been renovated.

Above the initial Romanesque level, the second floor was reconstructed, likely following the abandonment of the south aisle construction project. The intention was certainly to offset the decrease in light resulting from the north aisle's addition starting in 1480. Consequently, the top section of the frontage is notably open, with a capacious and flamboyantly filled bay occupying the majority of the gable and providing illumination for the nave. The lateral buttresses that support the façade are adorned with accolades and pinnacles that resemble those found on the apse of Saint-Malo church. This allows us to date this phase of the church's reconstruction to the early 16th century.

==== The southern wall ====
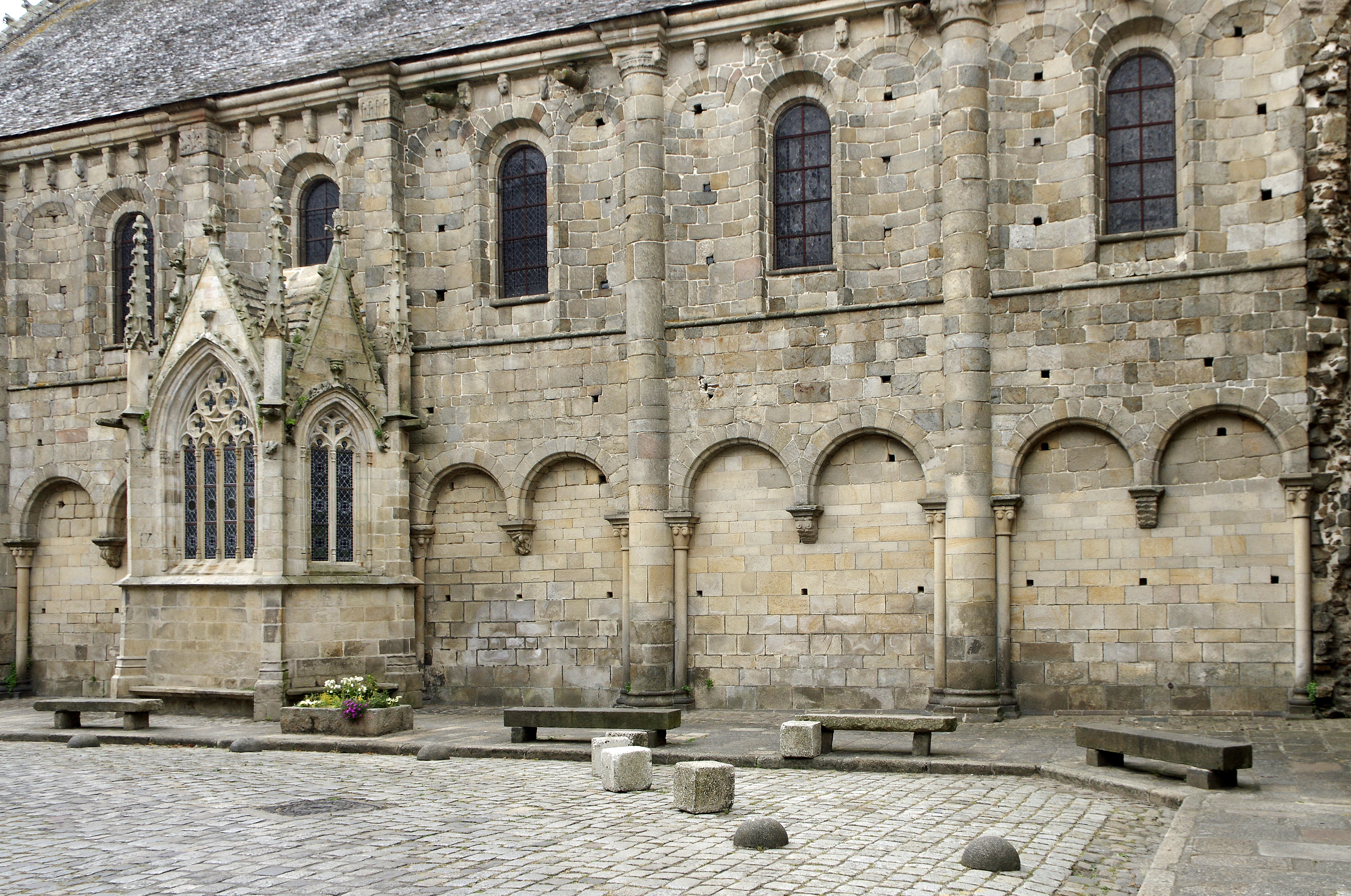
Southern wall

The south wall, just like the façade, is a surviving component of the Romanesque building. It is split into six bays by buttress-columns, with the exception of the third bay, which has pilasters. The wall is divided into two levels by a horizontal string course. The lower part is decorated with blind double arches that collapse in the middle onto a bracket and on the outside onto colonnettes. At the top of each bay of the wall, three niches complement it; the middle one has a window. A molded cornice crowns the top of the wall, supported by intricately carved modillions featuring figures and ornamental elements like palmettes and acanthus leaves.

Around 1500, a small private chapel was constructed into the third bay of this Romanesque wall. It extends three-sidedly from the wall and is topped by gables with sharp peaks, evocative of the radiating chapels of the Saint-Malo church, contemporaneously erected. Presumably, it replaced a Romanesque door that was once flanked by two pilasters.

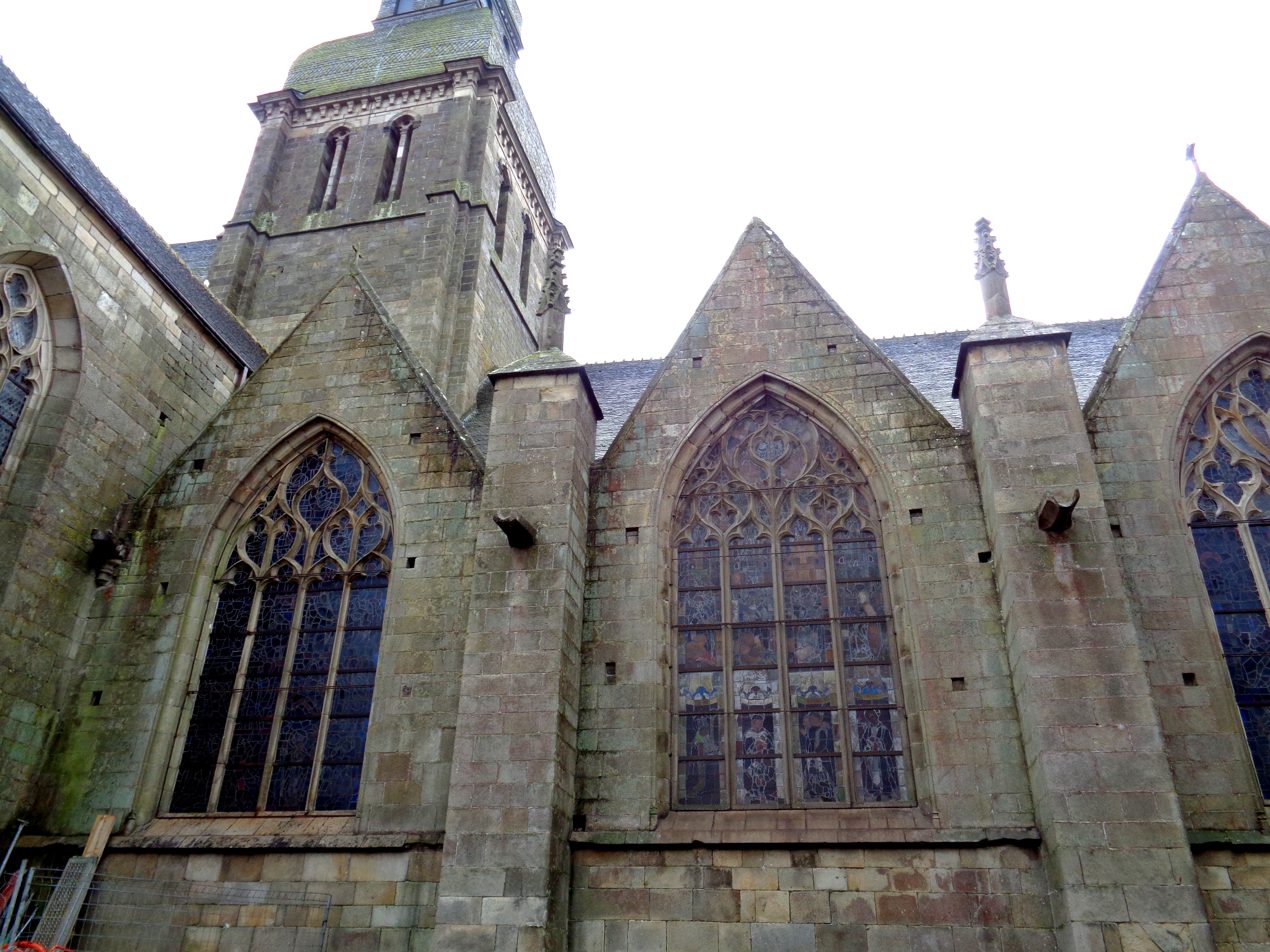
North transept, crossing tower, northern wall

==== The northern wall ====
The north aisle underwent reconstruction beginning in 1480, resulting in the current flamboyant Gothic wall. The construction culminated in 1509, and the wall features five grand, detailed bays, providing illumination to the nave through the aisle.

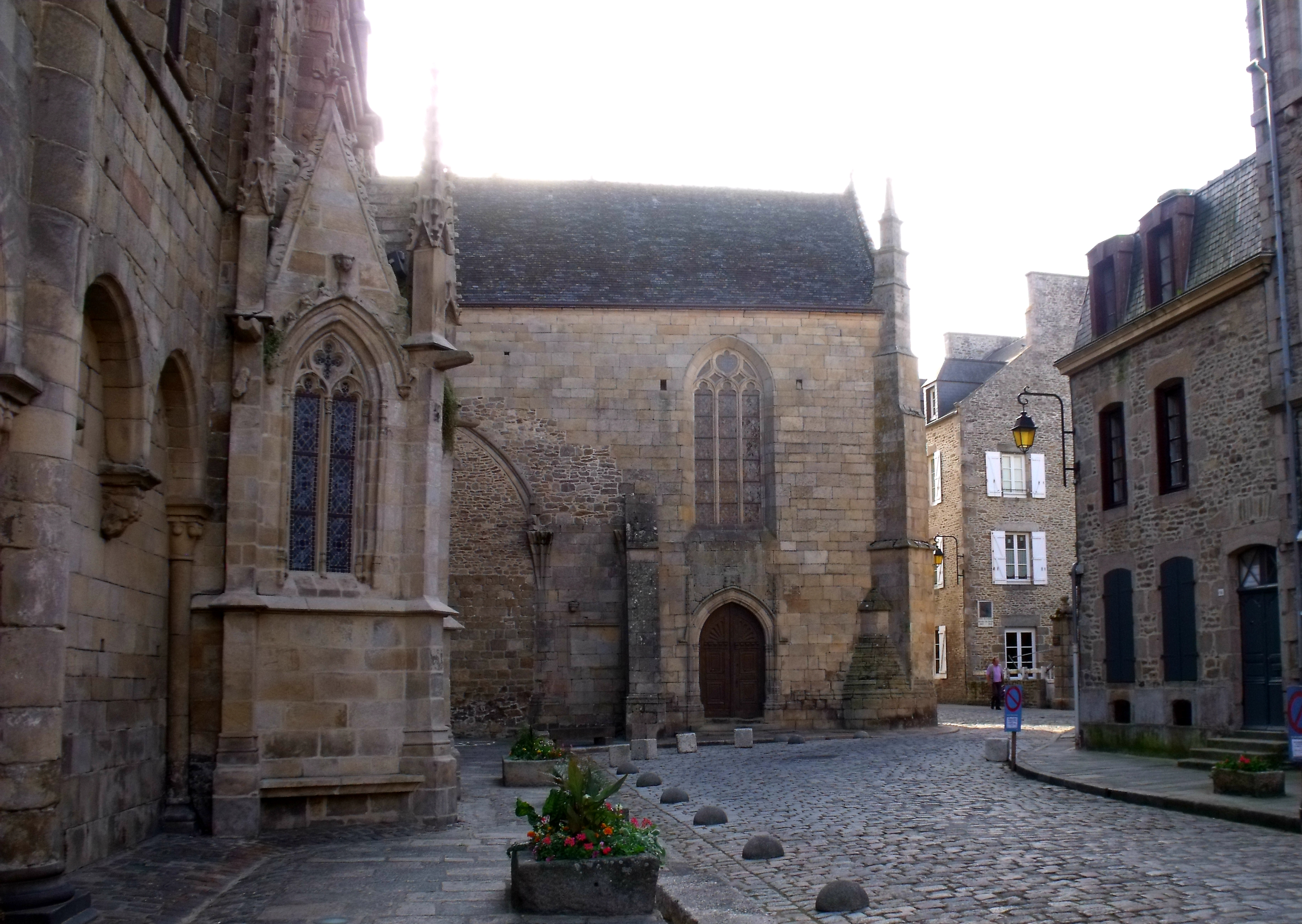
Southern wall and transept

==== The transept ====
Between the nave and the apse, a transept ascends with protruding arms, crowned by a crossing tower that replaced an earlier tower built in the first half of the 16th century. The former tower collapsed on October 22, 1547, before it was finished. Multiple dates are engraved on the tower, indicating that reconstruction continued until at least 1617.

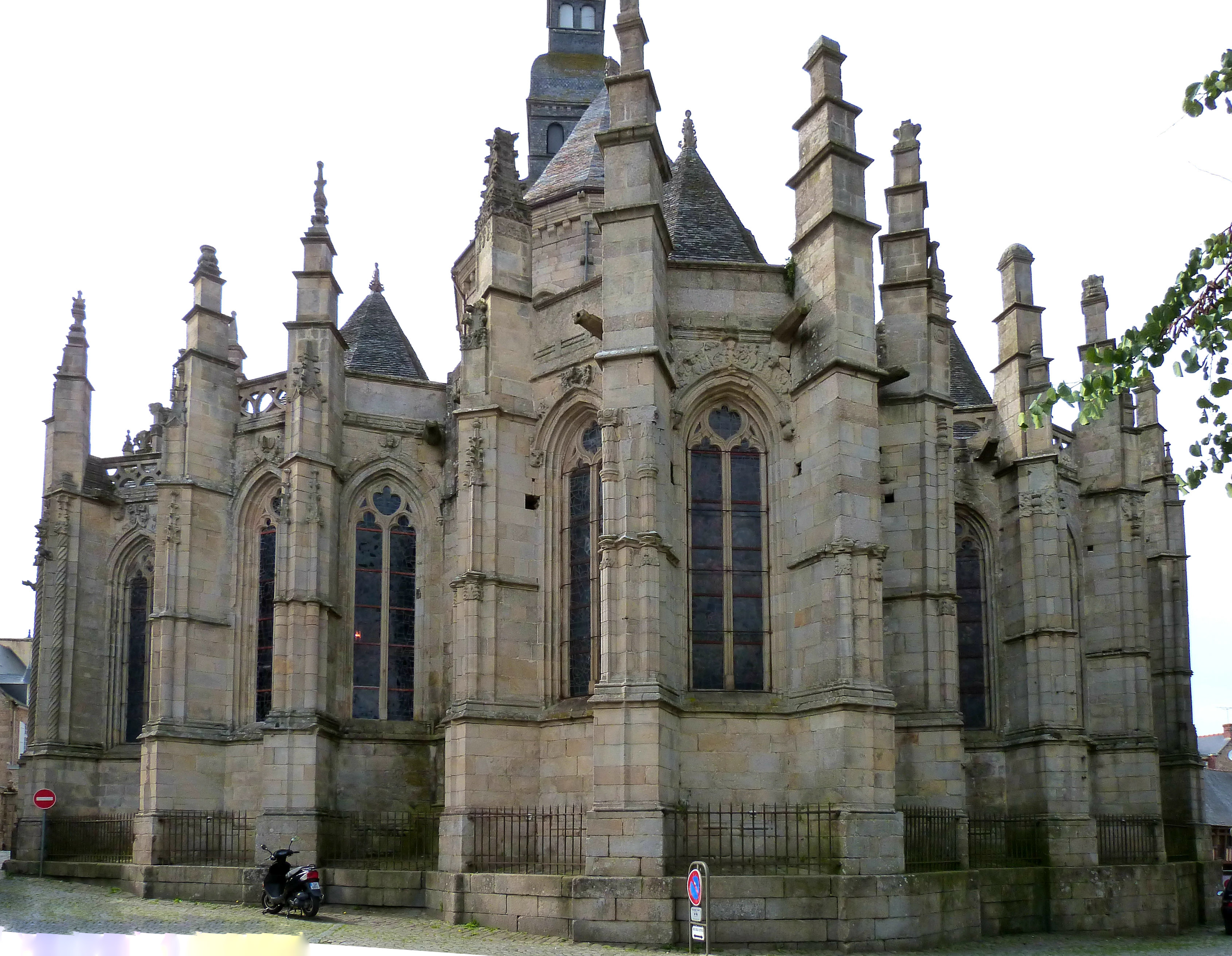
Church apse

==== The apse ====
The unfinished apse exemplifies 16th-century Gothic architecture with a high choir atop five radiating chapels. A railing along the entire length of the apse structures the horizontal decoration. The radiating chapels and ambulatory are covered by a shed roof crowned with polygonal roofs, replacing a terrace that formerly supported artillery pieces. Technical term abbreviations are explained when first used. The radiating chapels and ambulatory are covered by a shed roof crowned with polygonal roofs, replacing a terrace that formerly supported artillery pieces.

The ornamentation incorporates flamboyant designs of curved arches, plant decorations, and prismatic volumes, as well as Renaissance features like flat carved rinceau and twisted columns.

The flying buttresses were added during reconstruction following their collapse in 1547. The lower portions were constructed, but the upper sections were not necessary as counter-braces after the decision to replace stone vaulting with a paneled roof structure.

=== Interior ===
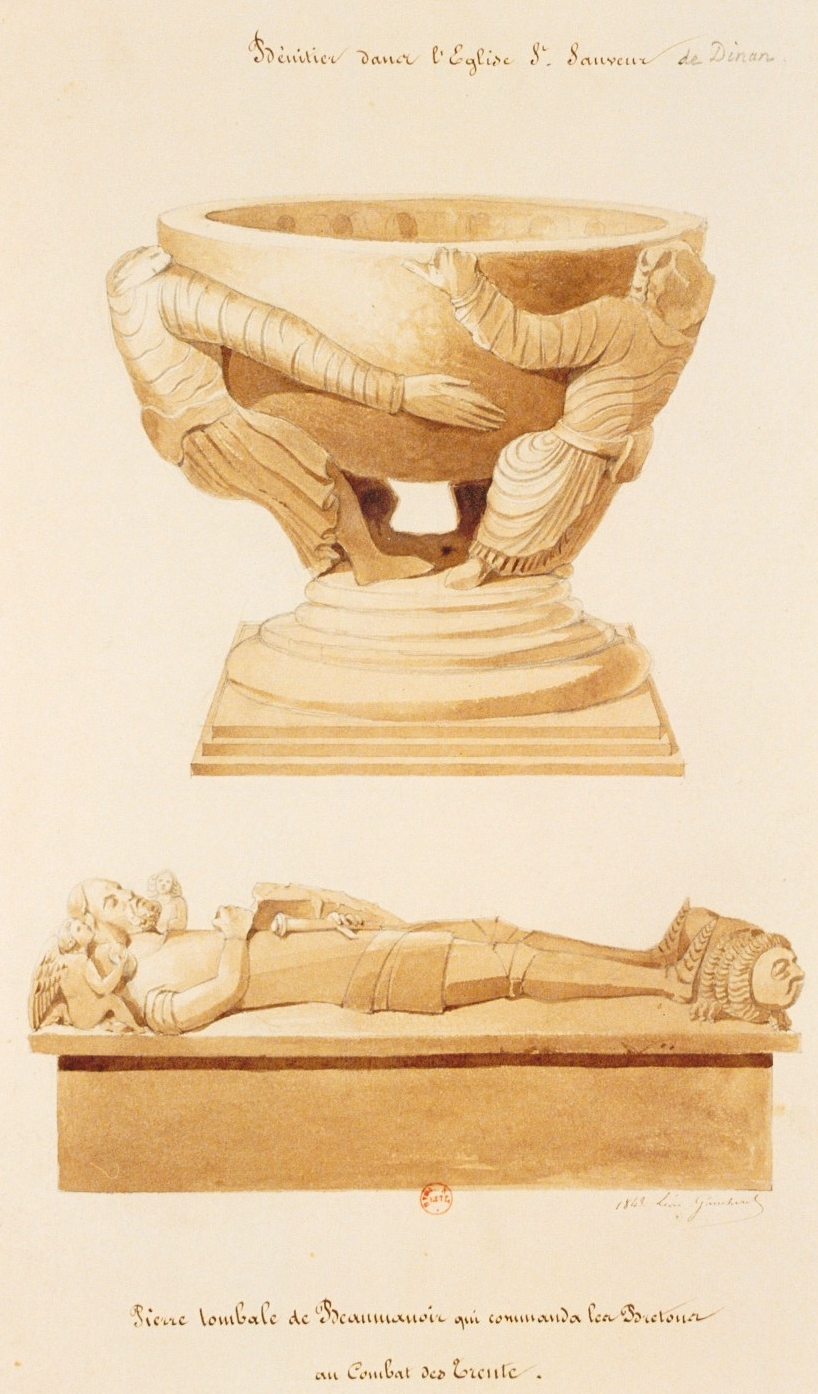
Stoup and tombstone of Jean IV de Beaumanoir in Saint-Sauveur church, Dinan (drawing by Léon Gaucherel, 1843)

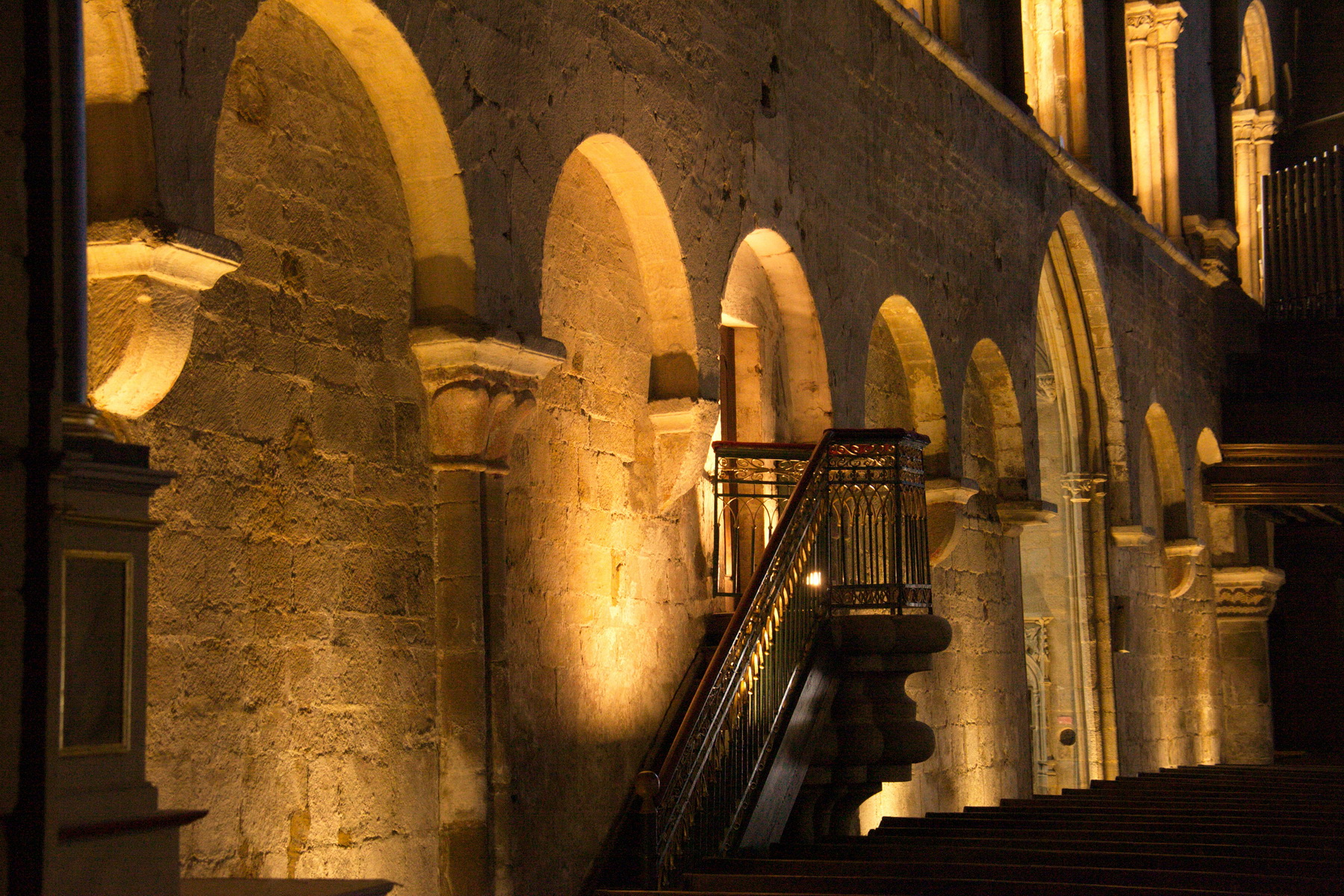
The south wall of the nave

==== The nave ====
The back of the façade, like the exterior, comprises a first level in the Romanesque style and a second level in the Gothic style. However, the Romanesque section is partially obscured by later modifications. The exterior tripartition is replicated, featuring three arches resting on pillars with capitals, along with two columns bordering the central entrance. Except for the small Gothic chapel that accesses it, the southern wall of the nave is completely Romanesque. Divided into two levels by a horizontal toric cordon, the exterior of the structure is separated from the lower section by geminated arcades. On either side of a capital adorned with hooked leaves, each pair of arches falls, while the central fall is supported by a simple corbel. The upper section of the structure is composed of alternating open and blind arcatures, each resting on a capital identical to those of the lower section. The first arcade, located to the west, is supported by an engaged column, whose capital is adorned with palmettes. Inside of the western façade, multiple sculpted capitals still remain. Among them, one capital portrays intertwined snakes, while the other two face each other and represent camels. Furthermore, two capitals have been situated in one of the radiating chapels, which could be imitations of the originals from the Romanesque era. One capital illustrates original sin, while the remaining one showcases the Annunciation.

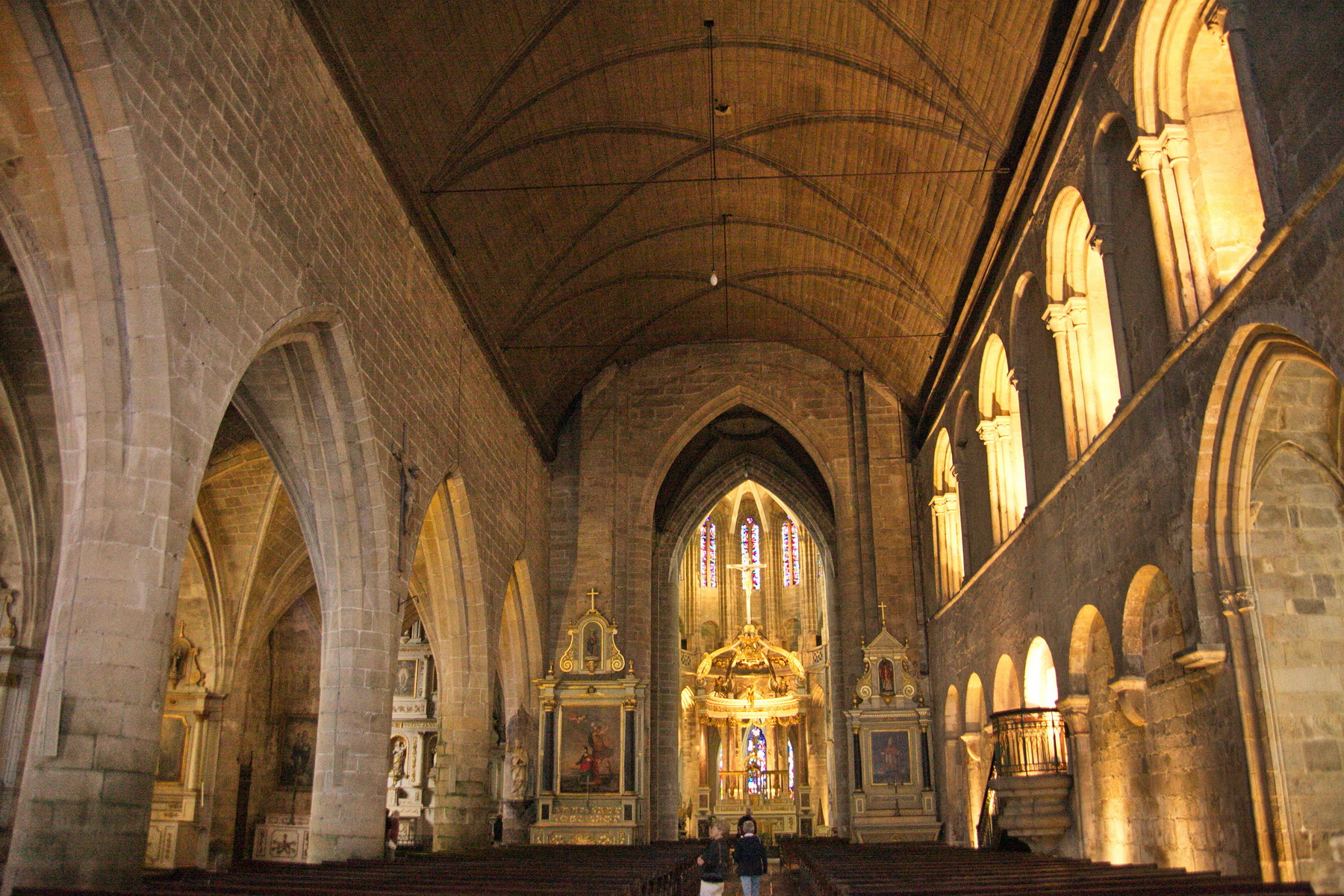
The nave

During the fifteenth century, the nave was rebuilt by builders who also added a north aisle. A south aisle was planned but was never constructed. Evidence of the initial construction can be found at the junction of the nave and transept on the south exterior wall. The nave and north aisle contain five bays and are connected by large arcades supported by strong columns, whose bases were removed when the floor was elevated in the eighteenth century. The nave is panelled and lacks tall windows. It is indirectly illuminated by the rib-vaulted aisle and chapels, which are lit by large windows in the flamboyant Gothic style. This design element was commonly found in 16th-century Breton churches.

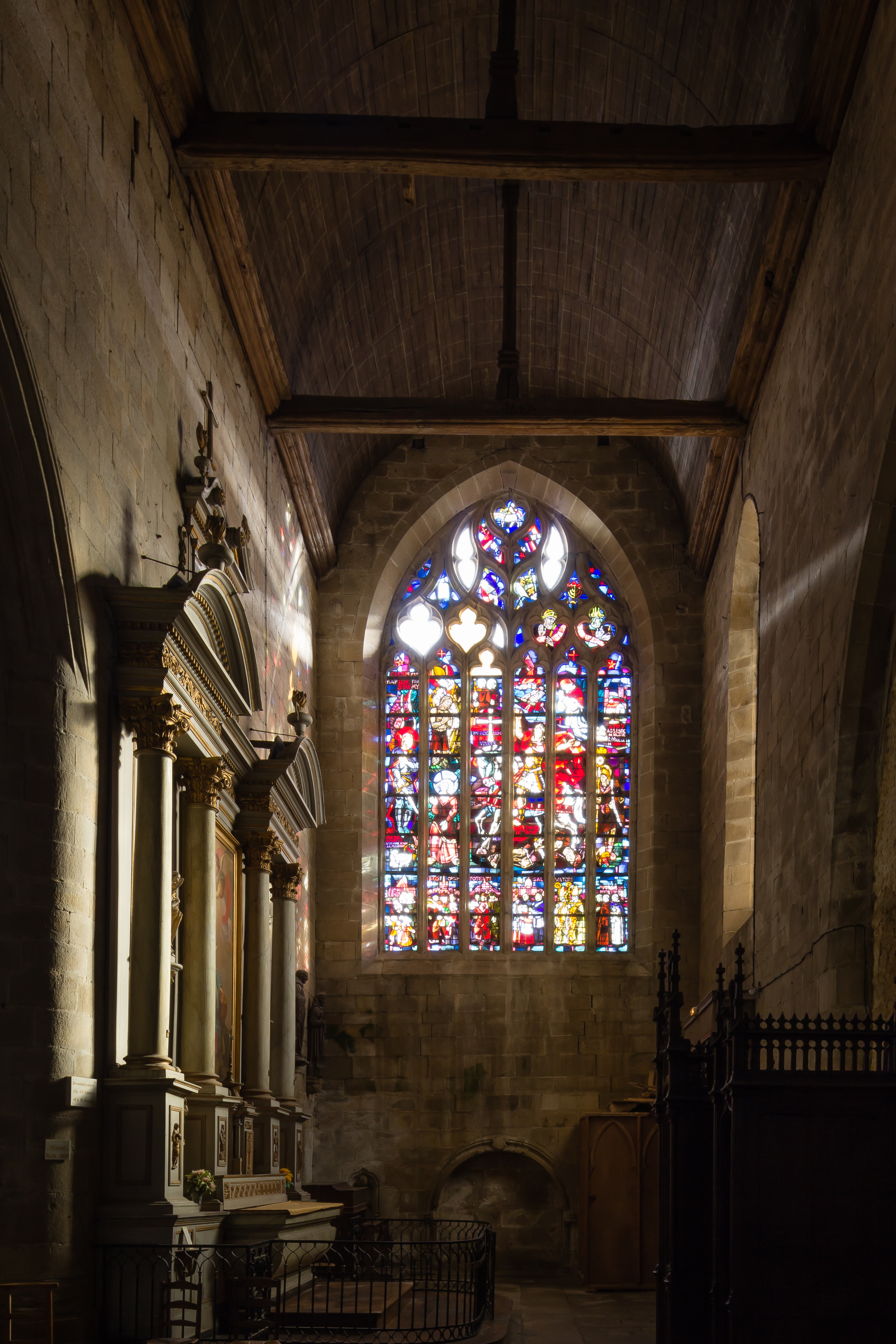
Bras sud du transept

==== The transept ====
Before the 15th-century modifications, a transept existed, and evidence of its removal can be observed on the outer side of the south wall of the nave. The nave and choir were partitioned by a triumphal arch, which is apparent in the arches sustaining the vault of the square transept. Furthermore, the lower and upper sections of the current bell tower suggest the existence of a square tower above.

The transept arms were constructed in the mid-16th century, after the lower parts of the apse had been rebuilt, making them later additions to the north aisle. The arms are equipped with large windows and panels, while only the transept crossing has a vaulted ceiling.

The sequence of construction, specifically the order of the nave, apse, and transept, accounts for the displaced row of columns between the nave and aisle and between the choir and ambulatory. To address this, the northwest pier of the crossing has a distinct shape from the east pier located on the apse side. Additionally, the fourth pier is situated along the south wall of the nave.

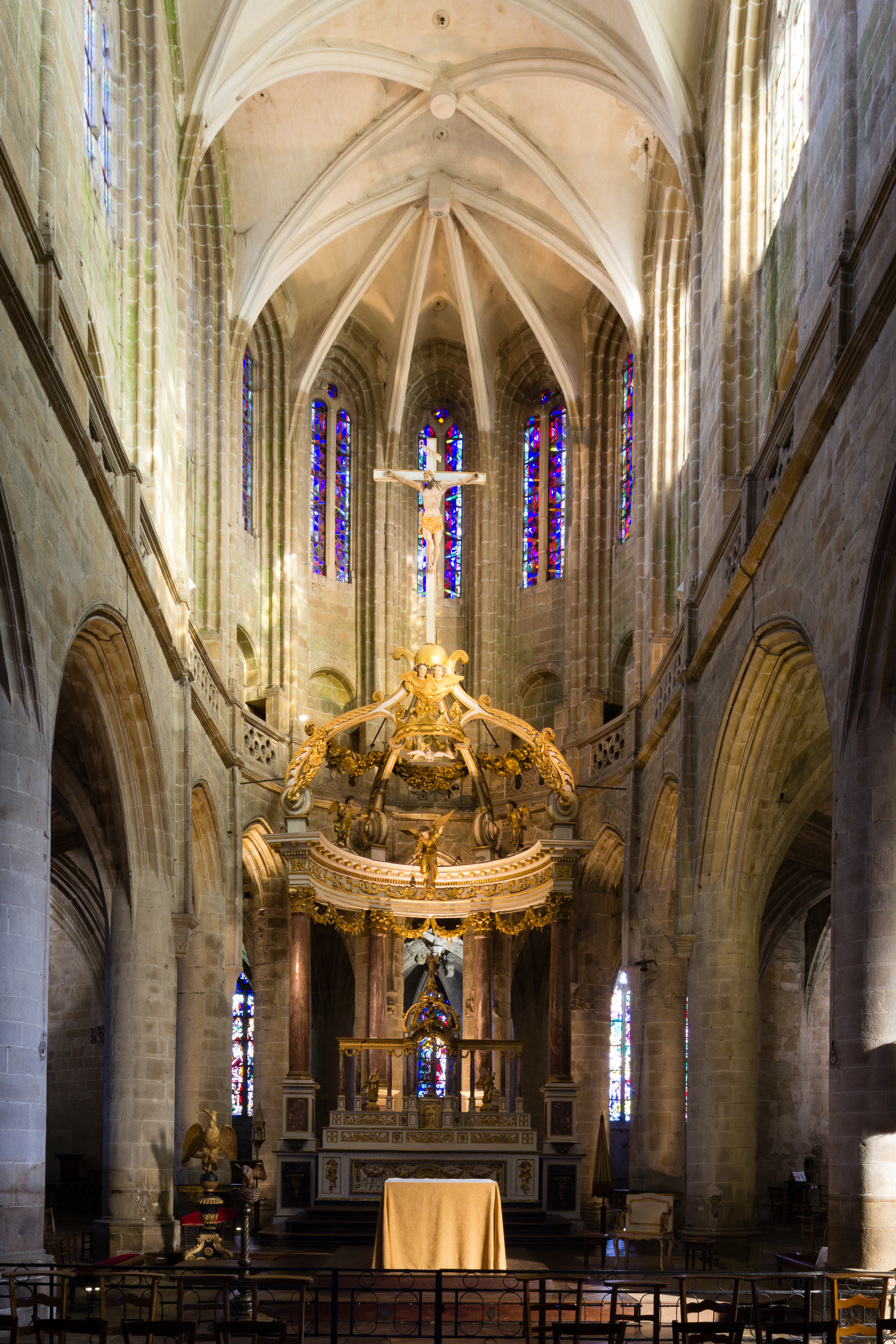
The choir

==== The choir ====
The choir consists of three straight bays and an apse, surrounded by aisles and a continuous ambulatory that opens onto five radiating chapels. The two aisles are accompanied by shallow side chapels with transverse barrel vaults. The ambulatory is vaulted with ogives, falling on nearly identical circular piers on either side of the circulation space, resulting in a significant plastic unity of the apse as a whole. The square pilasters support the rib vaults in the sanctuary, constructed post-1570, and are connected to the cylindrical piers beneath the start of the large arches by scrollwork clasps.

The radiating chapels feature ribbed vaults embellished with sculpted keys of the Passion's instruments. Within are grandiose credences adorned with canopies and niches, designed in the 16th-century Gothic style. The two southern chapels exhibit decor typical of 16th-century Brittany, with penetrating recesses or credenzas topped by cabbages.

The lower sections of the axis chapel showcase the same style of ornamentation, but with keystones carved with angels carrying shields and stylized floral designs. Finally, the two northern chapels are transitioning away from Gothic ornamentation. The Chapel closest to the main one now displays spiral keystones with a cherub profile in a medallion. The northernmost chapel has vaults that are no longer dropping into the supports but are now supported by culottes sculpted with fantastical figures.

== Stained-glass windows ==
Most of the stained-glass windows in the basilica were constructed during the second half of the 20th century. However, some older stained glass windows exist in several bays of the basilica. These may either belong to the basilica since its inception, or originated from another building and were later installed in the church. While some stained glass windows from the interwar period have been documented, their current whereabouts are unknown, and it is unclear how they went missing.

=== Ancient stained-glass windows ===
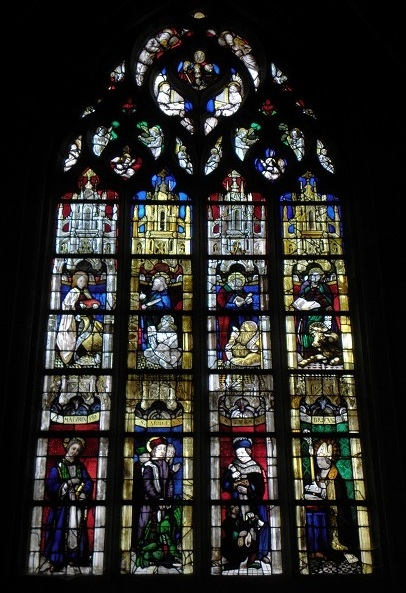
Des Evangelists stained-glass window

==== Bay 29, or Verrière des Évangélistes ====
The ancient stained-glass window in Saint-Sauveur church is positioned in the fourth chapel of the north aisle. It comprises four three-lobed lancets topped by a tympanum featuring 22 openings. The window portrays four Breton saints, Maturinus, Armel, Ivo, and Brioc, in the lower register, created in 1853 from drawings by Pierre Hawke. In the upper register, it illustrates the four ancient evangelists, John, Luke, Mark, and Matthew. The stained-glass window, classified with the building in 1882, features musician and thurible angels surrounding a Coronation of the Virgin.

This section underwent extensive reworking.

==== Bays 112 and 114 ====
Two windows in the Romanesque wall, bays 112 and 114, showcase components of previous stained glass that have been substituted in newer windows. Bay 112 includes ornamental borders, Castilian castles, scrolls, and quatrefoils that are more or less naturalistic. Bay 114 also boasts decorative patterns. These antique elements, potentially from the 13th century, were contributed to the church by a collector in the 1950s and were restored in 1959 by Hubert de Sainte-Marie's workshop.

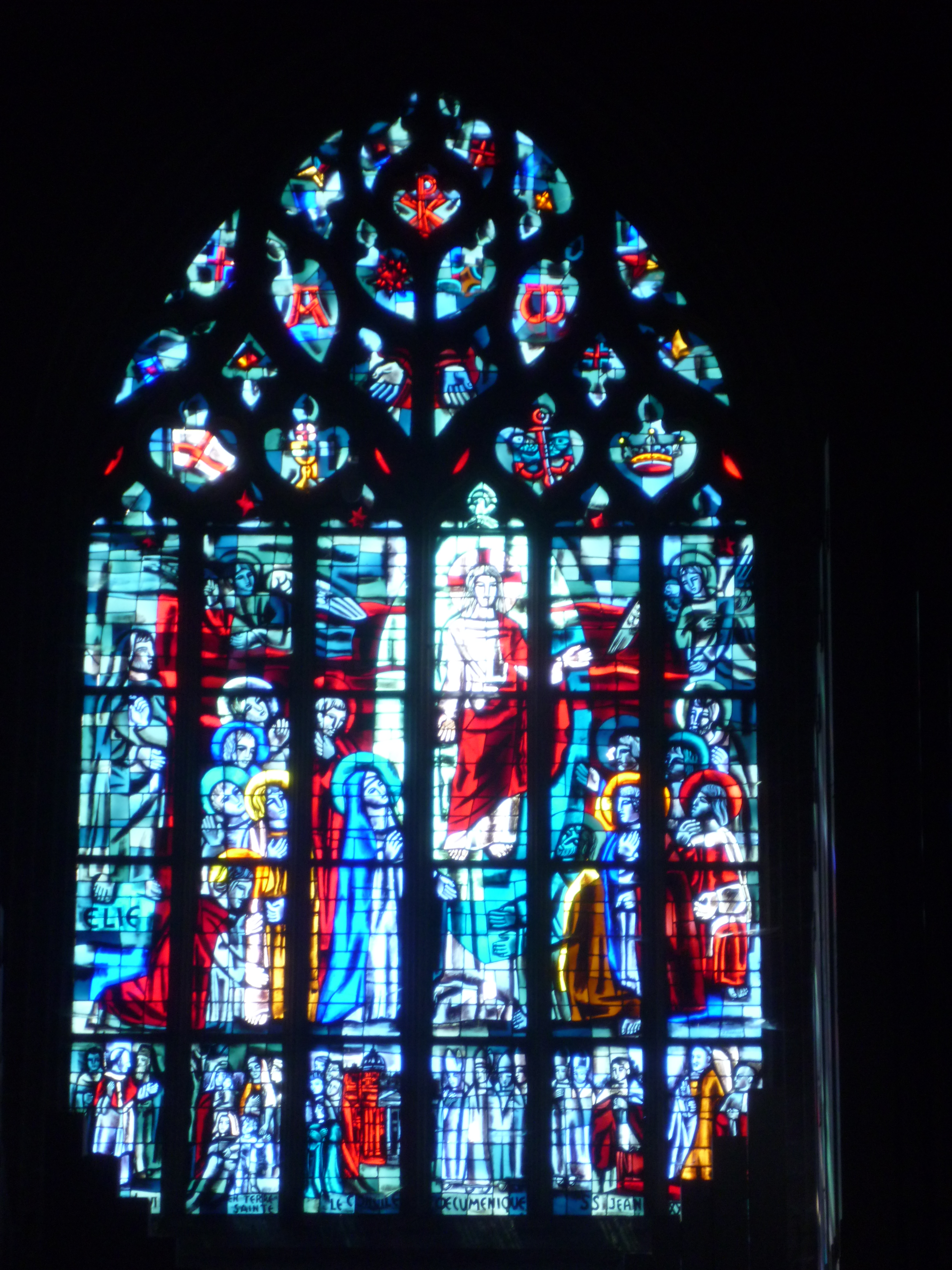
Stained-glass window by Louis Barillet

==== Lost ancient stained-glass windows ====
We should note the existence of several stained glass windows that are no longer extant but are attested to. In the transept, a stained glass window from the late 16th century dated 1594 appears to have vanished during World War II. In addition, the third chapel of the ambulatory on the north side had a tympanum that housed a Christ-Judge dating back to the first half of the 16th century, which remained until 1923. Additionally, the third chapel of the north aisle contained a tympanum featuring angels carrying the instruments of the Passion from 1480 to 1500, which was still present in 1931.

=== Modern stained-glass windows ===
The remaining stained glass windows in the building were created during the 19th century, with many of them being commissioned and installed during that time. The remaining stained glass windows in the building were created during the 19th century, with many of them being commissioned and installed during that time. However, most of them disappeared due to damage inflicted during World War II. To replace these windows, the majority of the stained-glass windows currently in the building were commissioned from Louis Barillet's studio in 1937 and were installed between 1939 and 1951.

== Furnishings ==
=== Heritage furnishings ===
The Basilica of Saint-Sauveur houses thirty-eight historic monuments, including paintings, altarpieces, sculptures, liturgical objects, and furnishings, all of which are listed or registered.

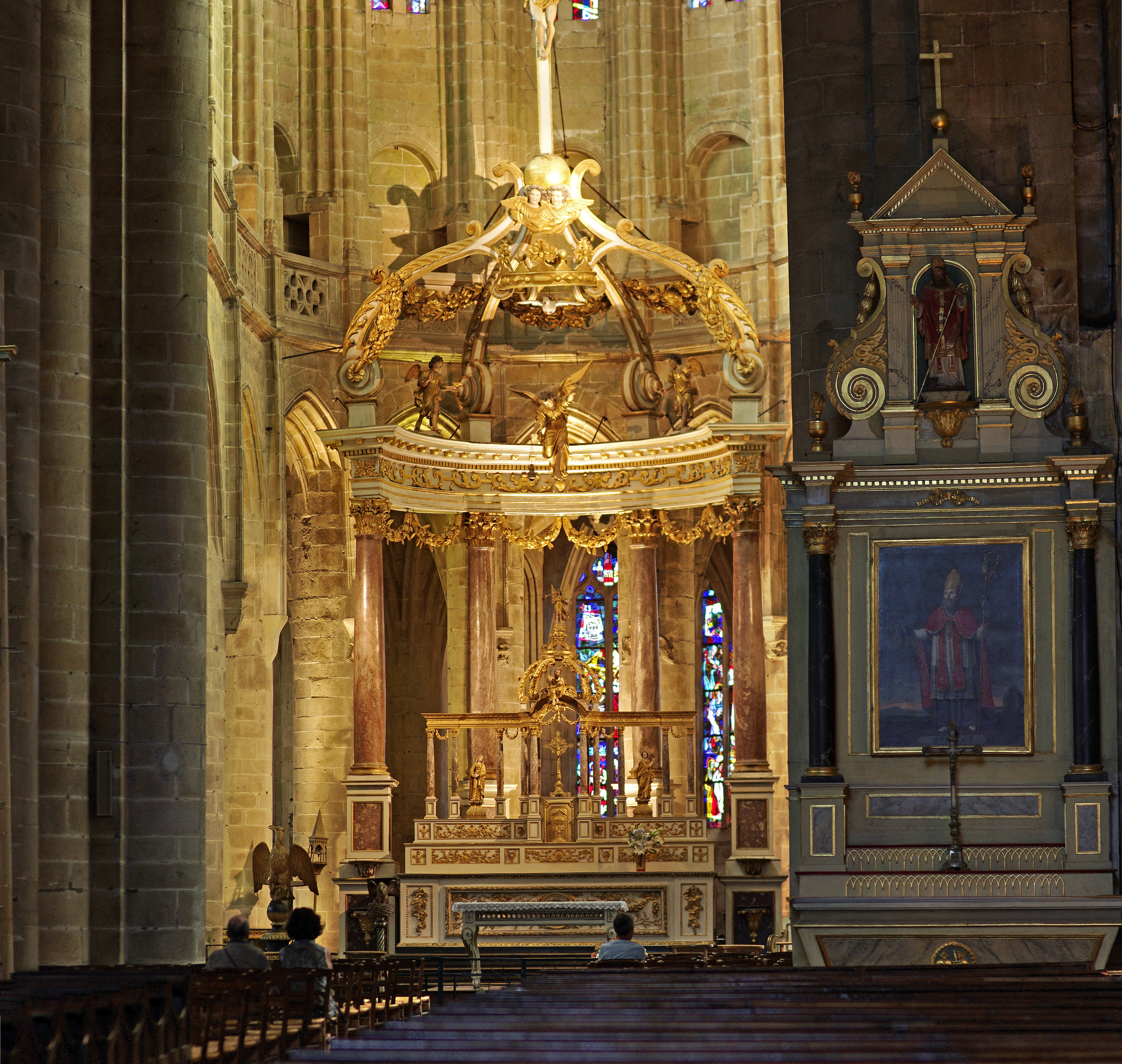
The high altar.

==== The high altar and its baldachin ====
In 1718, the Saint-Sauveur Church in Dinan installed a high altar that was created by architect Siméon Garangeau (1647–1741), with assistance from Jules Michel Alexandre Hardouin (?-1737), the controller of the King's buildings. The plan underwent further revision by architect Jacques le Bonhomme from Saint-Malo prior to being entrusted to François Lamandé and Jean Lemonnier. The altar was relocated in 1744 to make way for a new gilded wooden baldachin. François Lamandé and Thomas Maisonneuve collaborated on the design. Thomas Durocher and Pierre Morillon added two angels and completed the gilding in 1756. The ensemble was restored in 2007 and was designated a historic monument by decree on September 24, 1956.

==== The altarpieces ====
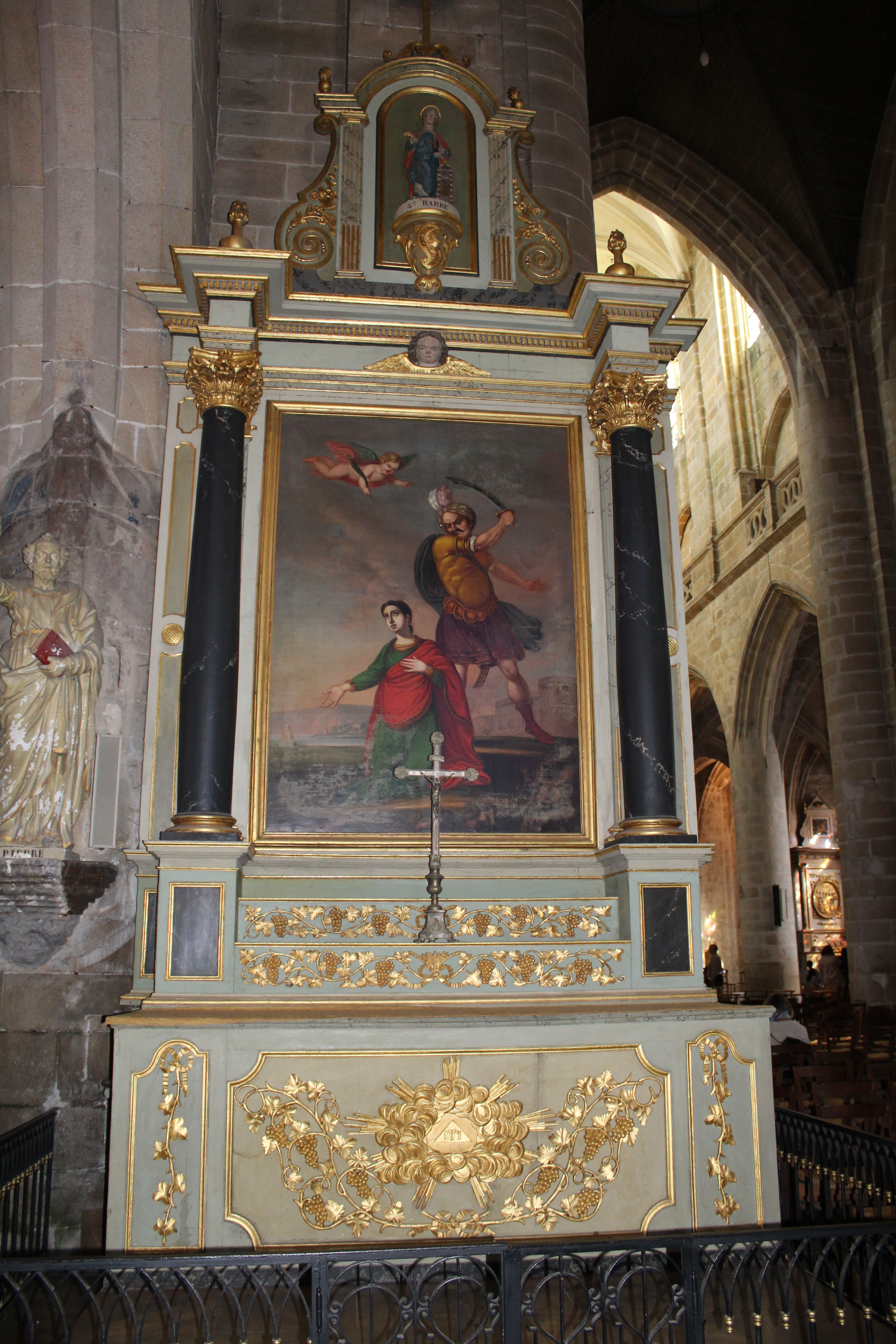
Altarpiece of the martyrdom of Saint Barbara

The church has multiple altarpieces, of which eleven are protected as historical monuments, with two being listed. It depicts the Martyre de sainte Barbe (Martyrdom of Saint Barbara in English) and was produced in the 18th century. The oldest listed altarpiece is located at the north-east pier of the transept crossing and is dedicated to Saint Barbara. The other listed altarpiece, dedicated to Saint Eligius, leans against the southwest transept pier. It depicts Éloi en évêque (Saint Eligius as a bishop in English), portrayed by painter and teacher Loyer from Rennes in 1817. Both the painting and the artist were decreed as historical monuments on July 12, 1985.

Additionally, there are nine altarpieces designated as historical monuments: the Rosary altarpiece, created in 1811; the Saint Mathurinus altarpiece, situated in one of the north aisle chapels and dated 1817; the Holy Angels altarpiece, also from 1817 and located in one of the north ambulatory chapels; and the St. John the Baptist altarpiece dated 1817, is located in a north chapel of the ambulatory. The altarpiece of the Savior, either dated 1817 or the 18th century, is also located in a north chapel of the ambulatory. The altarpiece of Saint Francis, which has the same dating ambiguity as the previous work, is situated in the chapel dedicated to that saint, who also dedicated the altar in the ambulatory. The altarpiece of the Holy Spirit is situated in one of the ambulatory's southern chapels, and its dating is as uncertain as the previous two. Additionally, there is an 1811-dated altarpiece in the south transept. All three altarpieces were registered as historical monuments on January 17, 1977, except for the Rosary altarpiece, which was listed on July 4 of the same year.

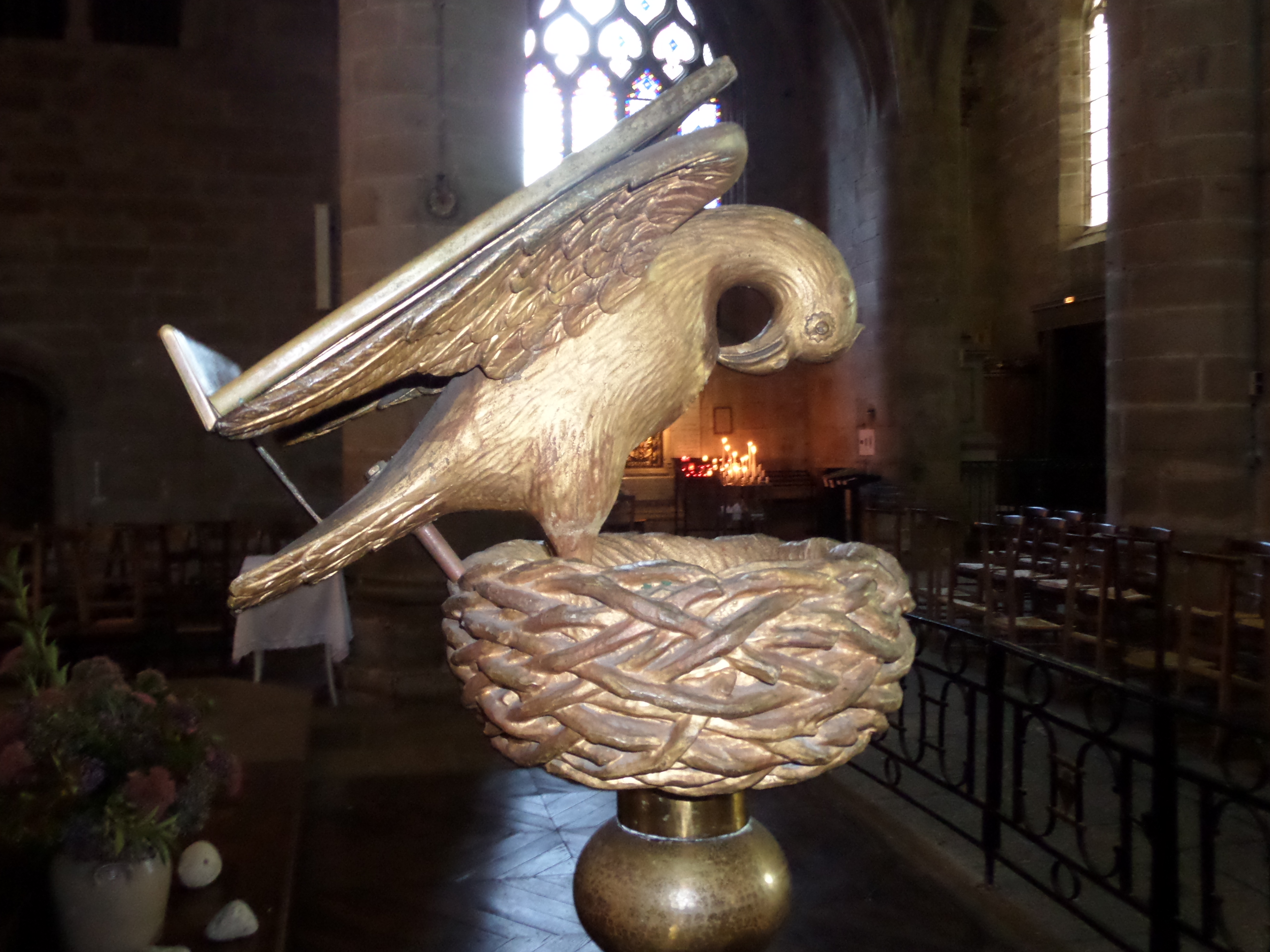
Pelican-shaped lectern

==== The lecterns ====
Two lecterns, one shaped like an eagle and the other a pelican, made of carved wood in the 18th century, are featured objects. The first one can be found in the north transept, where it underwent restoration alongside the high altar and baldachin in 2007. It was officially classified as a historic monument on November 5, 1912. The second one is situated in the choir and has been listed since January 30, 1975.

==== The relief of Notre-Dame des Vertus and the relief of Saint Eustache ====
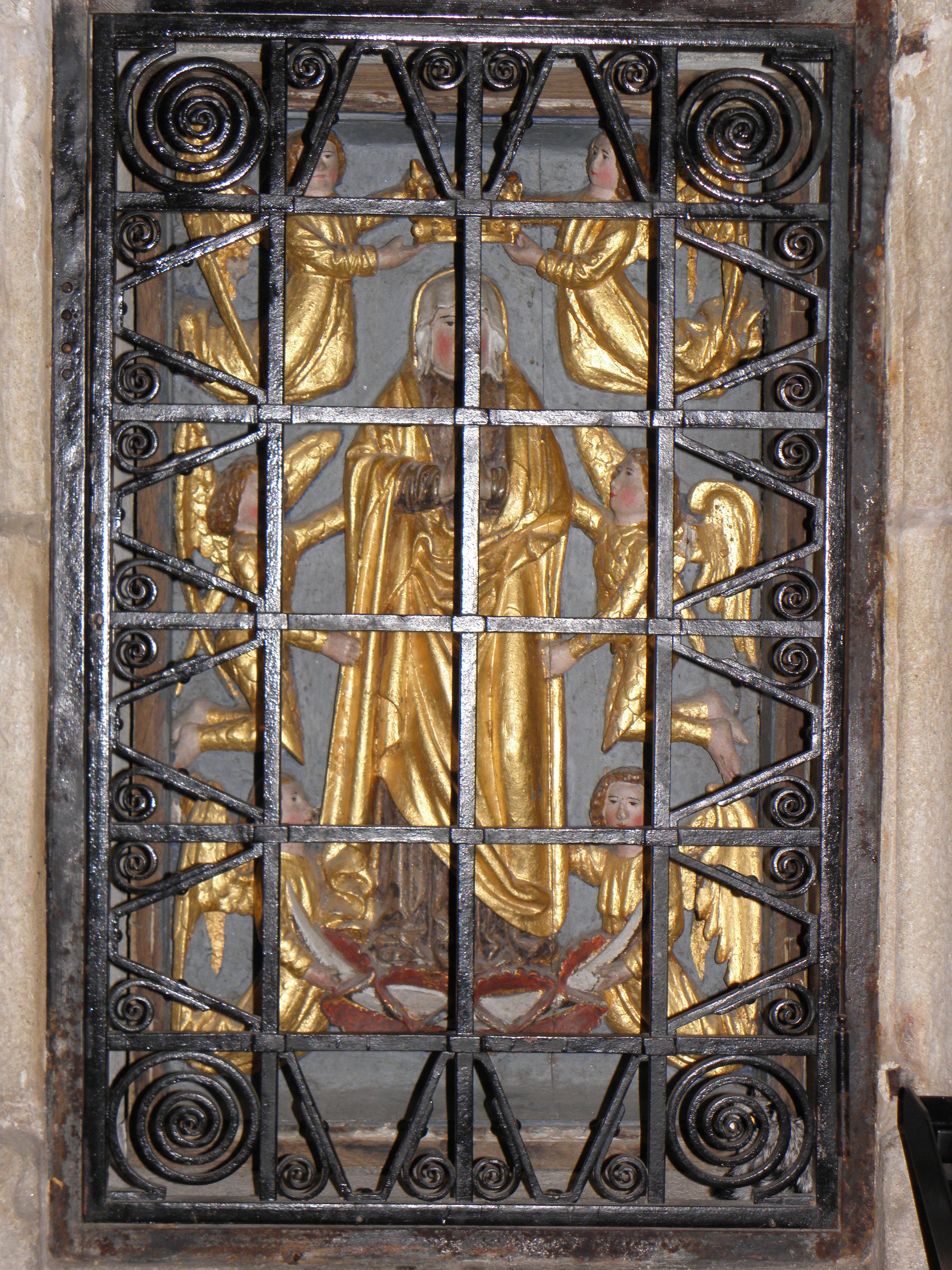
Relief of Notre-Dame des Vertus

The church houses two bas-reliefs that are listed as historic monuments. One of these, made of carved wood, portrays the Assumption of the Virgin surrounded by angels. It received its designation as a historic monument on December 24, 1912. This 15th-century object is known as Notre-Dame des Vertus and originates from the Cordeliers convent in the city. The convent, named Notre-Dame des Vertus, was likely named after a statue of the Virgin Mary that founder Henri d'Avaugour brought back from a pilgrimage to Assisi in the mid-13th century. The statue was given to him by Saint Bonaventure, but unfortunately, it was lost. As a result, devotions were transferred to a later relief.

The church houses a stone bas-relief from the late 15th or early 16th century, portraying Saint Eustace with his children, one taken by a wolf and the other by a lion. The sculpture gained recognition as a historic monument on January 30, 1975.

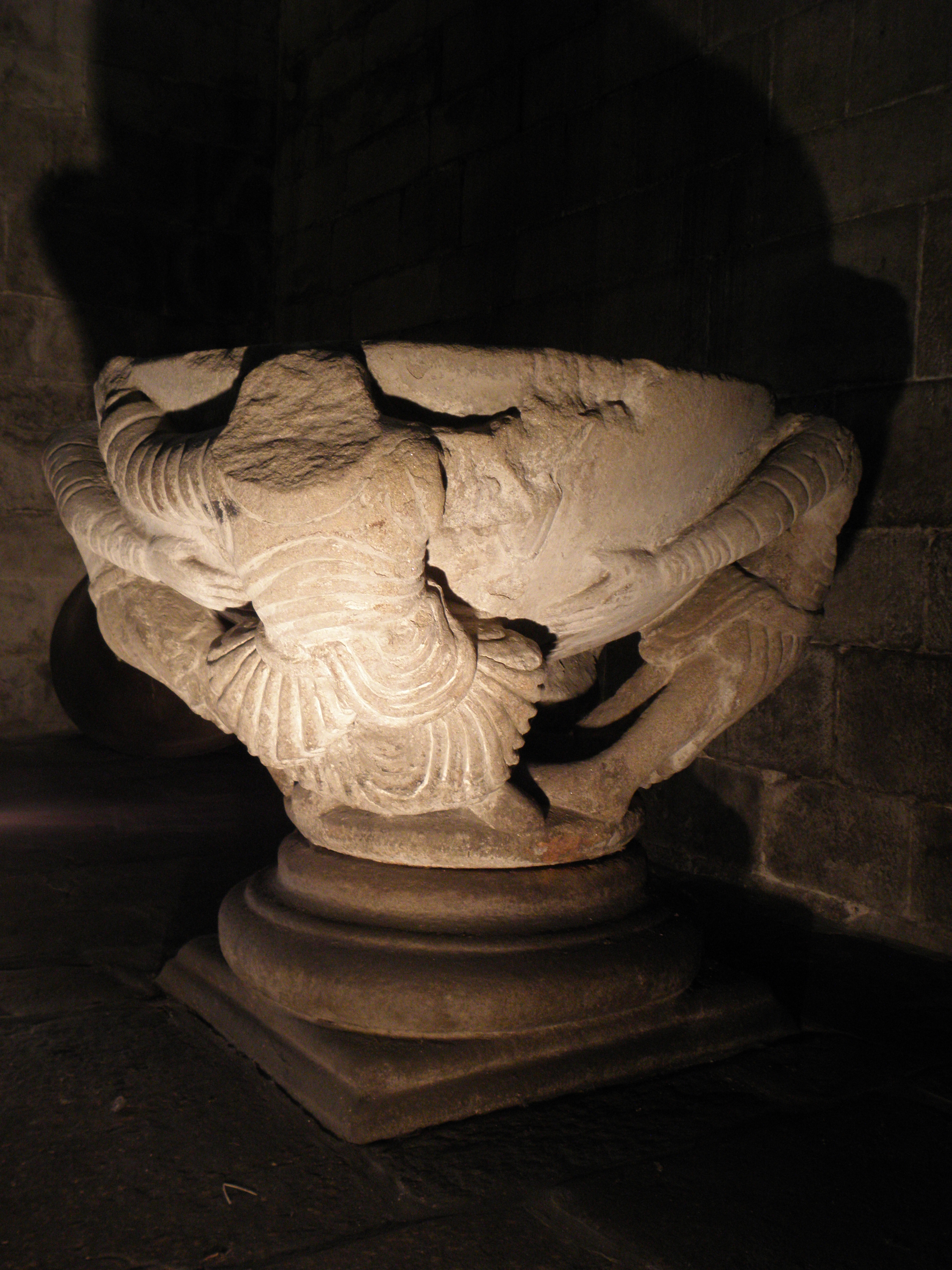
The stoup

==== The stoup ====
The carved stone baptismal font in the church dates back to its original construction during the 11th century. The font is composed of a round bowl placed on a rectangular base and decorated with four figures. It was classified as a historic monument, along with the church, in the 1862 list due to its purpose as a building.

==== The paintings ====
Two oil-on-canvas paintings in the building are protected as historic monuments. The first painting is a copy of Raphael's work in the Louvre, portraying Saint Michael slaying the dragon. It was commissioned by the Direction des Beaux-Arts and painted in 1847 by Alfred Thompson Gobert (1822–1895). The painting was listed as a historic monument on November 17, 1982. The second painting, depicting Du Guesclin sur son lit de mort (Du Guesclin on his deathbed in English), was donated by the government of King Louis-Philippe. Listed as a historic landmark since March 28, 1980, the structure is situated in the northern transept.

Additionally, within the building is a reproduction of L'Ange gardien (The Guardian angel in English) by Simone Cantarini, which is based on a 19th-century engraving with an unknown origin.

==== The statues ====
The building contains five historic monuments in the form of statues and statuettes. There is a seventeenth-century wooden statue of St. Nicholas located in the north ambulatory chapel that is dedicated to St. John the Baptist. Additionally, there is a sixteenth-century alabaster statuette of the Virgin and Child positioned at the top of the altarpiece located in the first north ambulatory chapel. Both of these artifacts have been listed as historic monuments, with the former being listed since January 30, 1975 and the latter since November 5, 1912. Three additional statues have been listed as historic monuments. These include a wooden statue of Saint Fiacre from the 19th century, a wooden statue of Saint Gilles from the 18th century, both listed since November 17, 1982, as well as a silver statue of the Virgin and Child crafted by Renaud between 1838 and 1847, listed since January 17, 1977.

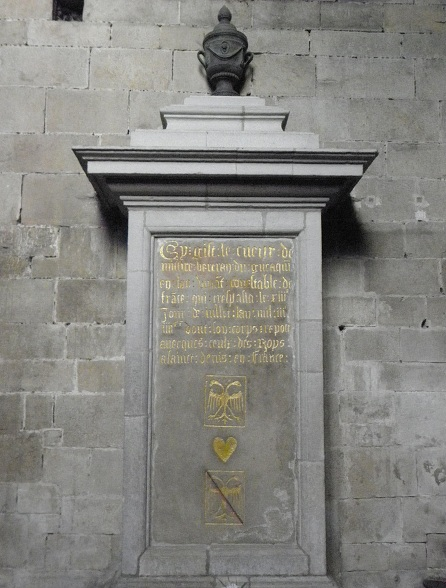
Monument to the heart of Bertrand du Guesclin

==== Bertrand du Guesclin's sarcophagus and the recumbent figures ====
The church contains the tomb of Bertrand du Guesclin's heart. Positioned in the right transept, it comprises a 14th-century engraved plaque encircled by a larger tomb constructed in the 18th century. The entire structure is fashioned from gilded granite. Regarded as a Immeuble par destination, it is registered as a historical monument in the 1862 list coupled with the church. Adjacent to it lies a container housing the remains of Tiphaine Raguenel, the first wife of Du Guesclin. The remains of the French Constable and his spouse were transferred to the basilica in 1810.

They are accompanied by three recumbent statues: those of Rolland de Dinan, Guillaume de Lesquen, and Berthelot d'Angoulevent. Initially, the recumbent figures were located in the Coëtquen tower of the Château de Dinan along with four others. They were relocated due to poor preservation conditions, specifically the climate, and a scenography project highlighting the military function of the Coëtquen tower, which was used for artillery. The Saint-Malo church was the new home for the other four recumbent figures.

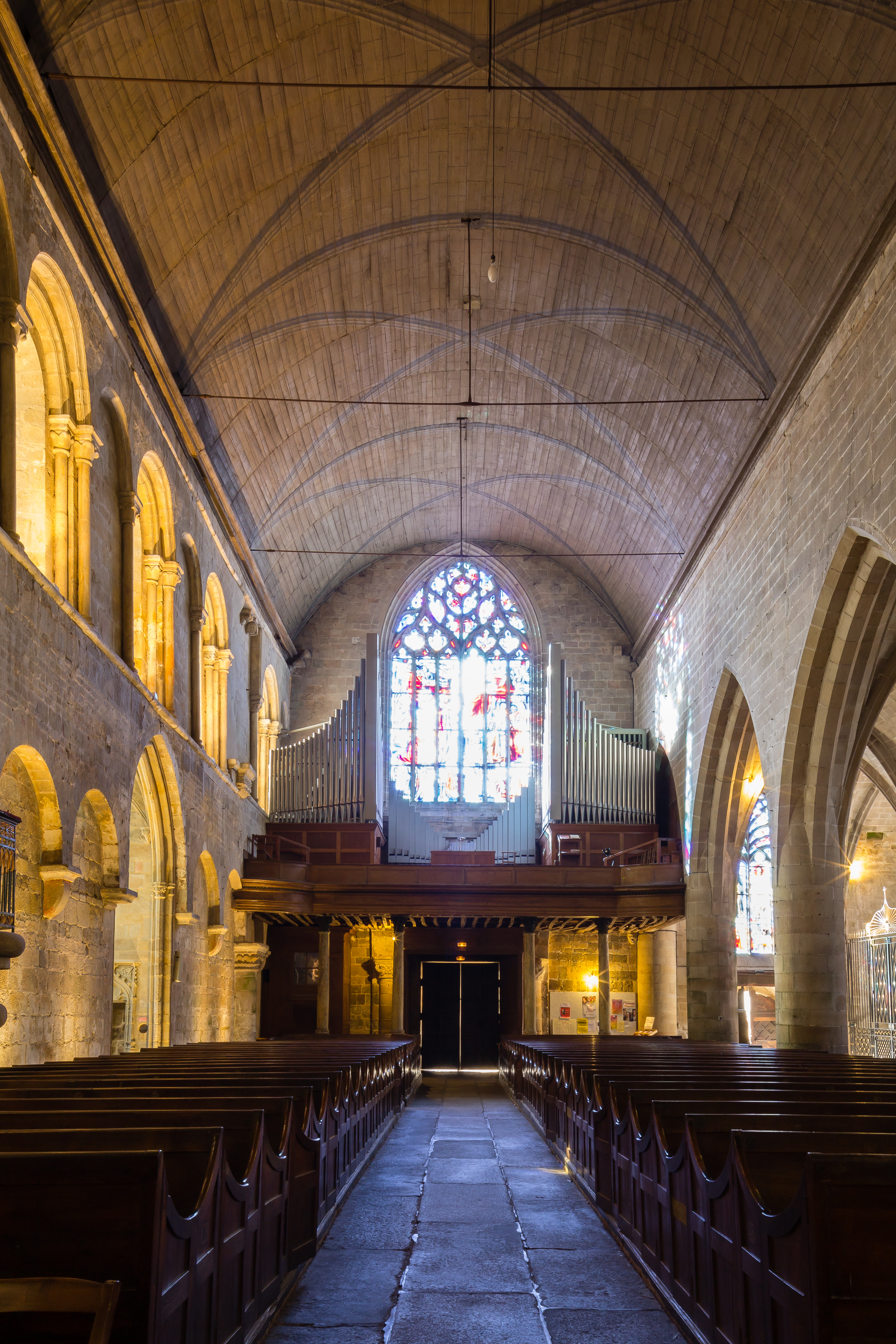
The organ

=== The organ ===
On February 3, 1839, the organ builder Aristide Cavaillé-Coll delivered his sixth instrument to the parish of Saint-Sauveur in Dinan. At the time, it had 28 stops on three manuals and a pedal: twelve stops on the Great Organ, eight on the Positive, four on the Swell and four on the Pedal. The instrument is located on the back of the west façade, supported by a heavy classical gallery built in 1836–1837. Four columns with Corinthian capitals support this construction, whose angles are rounded. The one-piece buffet features neoclassical architecture softened by Renaissance ornamentation. With five flat sides and crowned with scrolls, it blocks the west window. The instrumental part is very similar to the organs in the churches of Basilique Notre-Dame-de-la-Joie de Pontivy and Église Notre-Dame-de-Bonne-Nouvelle de Lorient. The simultaneous management of these three projects enabled the organ builder to reduce production costs and to deliver instruments that, although practically mass-produced, were of a high standard in terms of pre-romantic aesthetics.

In 1903, the instrument underwent its first transformation. Charles Mutin enlarged it, leaving only twelve original registers. Again, in 1966, Gonzalez-Danion modified the instrument. He removed the case and placed the pipes on either side of the large west window. Only seven Cavaillé-Coll stops remained.

Today, the Saint-Sauveur de Dinan organ has three manual keyboards and a pedalboard. With its neoclassical aesthetic, the electrically driven instrument has little in common with Cavaillé-Coll's work.

The composition is as follows (the original stops are in italics):

| I Great Organ Ut1-Sol5 | | II Positive Ut1-Sol5 | | III Swell Ut1-Sol5 | | Pedal Ut1-Sol3 | | Tirasses and copulas | Expression pedal |
| Bourdon | 16′ | Principal | 8′ | Quintaton | 16' | Soubasse | 16' | Copulas III/I, II/I, III/II | |
| Montre | 8′ | Cor de nuit | 8′ | Diapason | 8' | Flute | 16' | Tirasses I, II, III | |
| Bourdon | 8′ | Salicet | 4′ | Transverse Flute | 8' | Bourdon | 8' | Reed ventils I, II, III | |
| Flute | 8′ | Doublette | 2' | Voix céleste | 8' | Flute | 4' | Appel octaves 16 and 4 I, II, III | |
| Violoncello | 8′ | Sesquialtera | 2 rangs | Principal | 4' | | | | |
| Prestant | 4′ | Cromorne | 8′ | Doublette | 2' | | | | |
| Doublette | 2' | | | Plein-Jeu | 4 rows | | | | |
| Nasard | 2'^{2}_{3'} | | | Basson | 16' | | | | |
| Fourniture | 4 rangs | | | Trumpet | 8' | | | | |
| Cornet | 5 rangs | | | Basson-Hautbois | 8' | | | | |
| Trompette | 8' | | | Vox humana | 8' | | | | |
| Bugler | 4' | | | Bugler | 4' | | | | |

==== Organists ====
- Father Joseph Foutel, also an organist (in parallel with his classical studies at the Sorbonne, he attended the César Franck school, and was taught by Philippe de Brémond d'Ars,
- Isabelle Fontaine.

=== The bells ===
The basilica currently has three bells, located on the lower level of the bell tower, in the stone section.

Before the French Revolution, the basilica had four bells, but they were sold. The current bells were installed successively in 1832, 1868 and 1873, the 1873 bell being replaced in 1961. Their characteristics are the following:

- The Bourdon, Élisabeth, rings in A2 (high) and weighs about 2,516 kg. Its diameter at the clamp is 1,620 mm. It was cast in 1868 at Viel-Tétrel in Villedieu-les-Poêles. It was donated by Mademoiselle Marie-Josephine Habrington and sponsored by Henri-Pierre Flaud, mayor of Dinan from 1861 to 1874.
- The second bell, without a christening name, is in C#3 (high) and weighs about 1,250 kg. Its diameter at the clamp is 1,285 mm. Cast in 1832 by Viel-Tétrel, Marquet-Viel and Viel-Ozenne frères of Villedieu-les-Poêles, its godmother is Mademoiselle Célestine Bazin and its godfather is Monsieur Paul Paterne de Saint Pern de Couëllan, son of Joseph, mayor of Dinan from 1830 to 1835.
- The third, Anne Cécile, sounds in D3 (high) and weighs between 845 and 900 kg. Its diameter at the clamp is 1,150 mm. It was cast in 1961 by Cornille-Havard of Villedieu-les-Poêles. The inscription on the back reads: Nomée Anne Cécile, j'ai pour parrain M. Joseph Daniel et pour marraine Mme Aubert née Anne Fournis. Je remplace Louise-Pauline donnée par la famille Larere en 1873 (Named Anne Cécile, my godfather is Mr Joseph Daniel and my godmother is Mme Aubert née Anne Fournis. I replace Louise-Pauline given by the Larere family in 1873.). She rang the Angelus three times a day, at 8:02 hrs, 12:02 hrs and 19:02 hrs.

== Appendix ==
=== Bibliography ===
- ^{(fr)} Anne Autissier, La sculpture romane en Bretagne. xie – xiie siècles, Rennes, Presses universitaires de Rennes, coll. "Art & société", 2005, 380 p. (ISBN 2-7535-0066-5), pp. 266–268.
- ^{(fr)} Dom Jean-Martial Besse, Abbayes et prieurés de l'ancienne France, t. VIII: Province ecclésiastique de Tours, Paris/Ligugé, Picard/Abbaye de Ligugé, 1920 (read online archive), p. 305.
- ^{(fr)} Michel Boccard, "Dinan. Eglise Saint-Sauveur", Congrès Archéologique de France, Paris, Société Française d'Archéologie, vol. 173e session, 2015 "Monuments des Côtes-D'Armor: Le "Beau Moyen Âge"", 2017, p. 207-221. (ISBN 978-2-901837-70-1)
- ^{(fr)} Philippe Bonnet and Jean-Jacques Rioult, Bretagne gothique: l'architecture religieuse, Paris, Picard, 2010, 485 p. (ISBN 978-2-7084-0883-8), pp. 132–137.
- ^{(fr)} Françoise Cassigneul-Cohan, "De l'assistance spirituelle à l'affirmation du temporel. Pour une lecture sociale de la " Confrairie de Messieurs les prêtres et chapelains de cette ville de Dinan, faubourgs et des environs " aux XVIIe et XVIIIe siècles", Annales de Bretagne et des Pays de l'Ouest, vol. 126–1, 2019, pp. 75–102 (read online [archive]).
- ^{(fr)} Michel Cocheril, Les orgues en Bretagne, Baillé, Editions Ursa, 1988, 32 p. (ISBN 2-86934-010-9), p. 18–19.
- ^{(fr)} Henri Corbes, "Les orgues du département des Côtes-du-Nord (Esquisse historique)", Bulletins et mémoires de la Société d'Emulation des Côtes-du-Nord, vol. XCIV, 1966, p. 48–81.
- ^{(fr)} René Couffon, "Répertoire des églises et chapelles du diocèse de Saint-Brieuc et Tréguier", Bulletins et mémoires – Société d'émulation des Côtes-du-Nord, vol. 70, 1938, p. 96–100.
- ^{(fr)} Marc Déceneux, La Bretagne romane, Rennes, Ouest-France, 1998, 127 p. (ISBN 2-7373-2262-6), p. 91–92.
- ^{(fr)} Maurice Dilasser (ed.), Patrimoine religieux de Bretagne. Histoire et inventaire, Brest, Le Télégramme, 2006, 381 p. (ISBN 2-84833-173-9), p. 82–83.
- ^{(fr)} Françoise Gatouillat and Michel Hérold, Les vitraux de Bretagne, Rennes, Presses universitaires de Rennes, coll. "Corpus vitrearum. France / Série complémentaire, Recensement des vitraux anciens de la France" (no. 7), 2005, 367 p. (ISBN 2-7535-0151-3), pp. 61–63.
- ^{(fr)} Roger Grand, L'art roman en Bretagne, Paris, Picard, 1958, 494 p., p. 259–264.
- ^{(fr)} Chantal Leroy and Dominique de La Rivière, Cathédrales et basiliques de Bretagne, Paris, Ereme, 2009, 207 p. (ISBN 978-2-915337-69-3), p. 16–23.
- ^{(fr)} Gérard Lomenec'h, Cloches et carillons de Bretagne: art et tradition campanaires, Spézet, Coop Breizh, 2000, 217 p. (ISBN 2-84346-074-3).
- ^{(fr)} Anne Lunven, "La paroisse", in Du diocèse à la paroisse: évêchés de Rennes, Dol et Alet/Saint-Malo. ve – xiiie siècles, Rennes, Presses universitaires de Rennes, 2014 (ISBN 978-2-7535-5955-4, doi:10.4000/books.pur.49321, read online archive).
- ^{(fr)} Gérard Malherbe, L'église Saint-Sauveur de Dinan. Plan guide, S.l., s.d., 4 p.
- ^{(fr)} Mathurin-Eugène Monier, Dinan: Mille ans d'histoire, Mayenne, J. Floch, 1977, 2nd ed., 582 p., p. 45–110.
- ^{(fr)} André Mussat, Bretagne, architecture et identité, Rennes, Presses universitaires de Rennes, 1997, 472 p. (ISBN 2-86847-187-0), p. 383–387.
- ^{(fr)} Louise-Marie Tillet, Bretagne romane, Saint-Léger-Vauban, Zodiaque, coll. "La Nuit des Temps" (no. 58), 1982, 345 p., p. 115–119.
- ^{(fr)} Loïc-René Vilbert, Dinan au Moyen Âge, Dinan, Le Pays de Dinan, 1986, 354 p. (ISBN 2-905952-01-6), p. 15–30.
- ^{(fr)} Musique et danse en Bretagne, Recensement des orgues de Bretagne, Châteaugiron, ARCODAM, 1987, 642 p. (ISBN 2-9501799-1-6).

=== External links ===
- fr:Église Saint-Malo de Dinan
- fr:Liste des monuments historiques de Dinan
- fr:Liste des monuments historiques des Côtes-d'Armor
- fr:Liste des églises des Côtes-d'Armor
- fr:Liste des édifices romans en Bretagne
- Religious resources: ^{(fr)} Clochers de France ^{(fr)} Observatoire du patrimoine religieux GCatholic.org
- Architectural resources: ^{(fr)} Mérimée ^{(fr)} PSS ^{(fr)} Structurae
- ^{(fr)} History and description of the Saint-Sauveur basilica archive on the Inventaire du patrimoine de la région Bretagne website
- ^{(fr)} L'Angélus sonné par la cloche Anne Cécile archive on SoundCloud.com (accessed August 4, 2019).
- ^{(fr)} La basilique St-Sauveur de Dinan – Communauté pastorale de Dinan archive
- ^{(fr)} (Stained glass) Stained glass windows from the Saint-Sauveur basilica in Dinan (Côtes-d'Armor) archive.
- ^{(fr)} St-Sauveur de Dinan basilica and its organs – Isabelle Fontaine, organist archive
