= Knights Templar in Brittany =

Knights Templar in Brittany, also known locally as the red monks.

== Background ==
In 1127, the Order of the Poor Fellow-Soldiers of Christ started fund-raising efforts throughout Western Europe so as to fund their crusading ambitions in the Holy Land.

By 1129, these efforts enabled the Order to receive significant donations and political backing and secured the Church's official approval at the Council of Troyes.

=== Local context ===
It was during this time that the Order received donations from the Sovereign Duchy of Brittany, mainly related to lands around Retz. Duke Conan III, ceded property on the outskirts of the commercial city of Nantes and the capital, Rennes awarding market rights in Nantes.

By 1139, Pope Innocent II had also granted the Order special privileges such as:

- Allowing the Order to build their own chapels and were not required to pay tithes;
- Exempting the Order from episcopal jurisdiction, except from the pope alone.

The subsequent Duke, Conan IV further donated property. This enabled the Order to construct castles, farms and even whole villages like Vildé-Guingalan. They cleared expanses of land in northern Brittany for crops and animal husbandry, cultivated vineyards, producing wine and operating ovens and mills. They also promoted, fairs and public markets at Pléboulle and Les Bias.

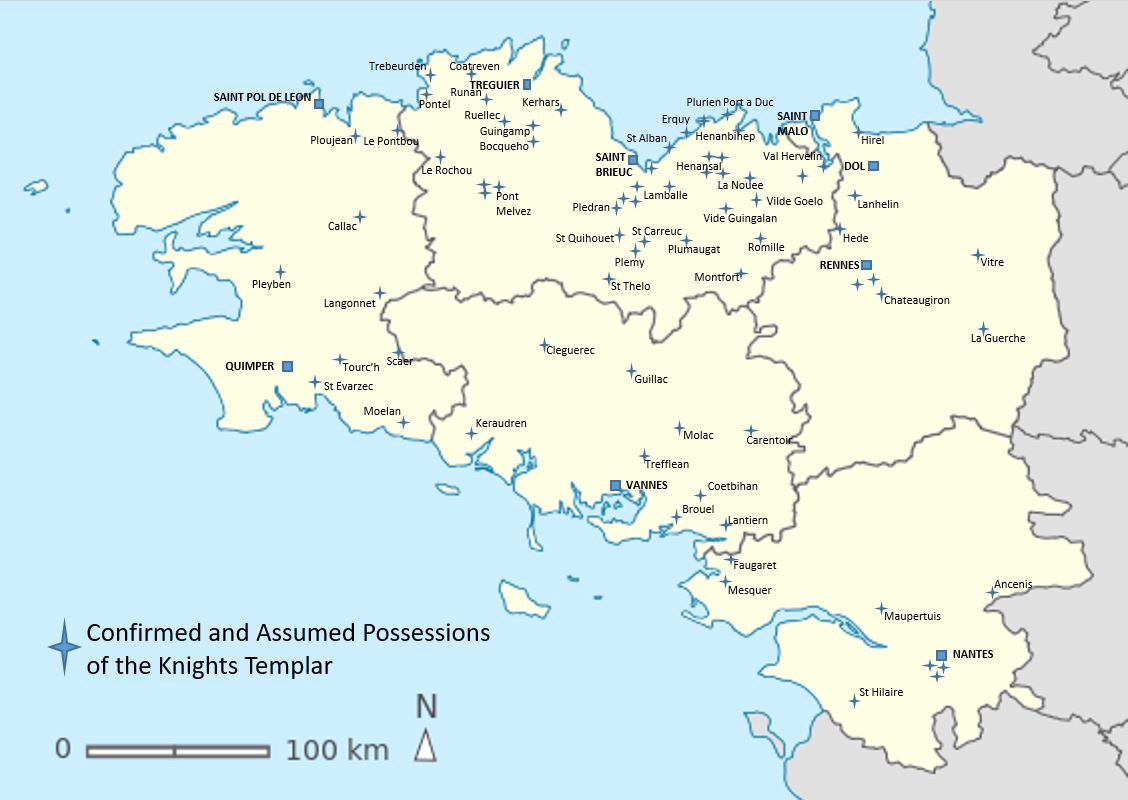
Map of Confirmed and Assumed Possessions of the Knights Templar in Brittany

=== Some well known sites ===
- Chapelle Saint-Jean-Baptiste (Carentoir)
- Chapelle Saint-Jean de La Roche-Derrien
- Chapelle Notre-Dame de Cran
- Chapelle templière de La Vraie-Croix
- Commanderie de Limerzel
- Temple de la Coëfferie

=== Friction with land owners ===
The increased competition triggered by the Orders commercial activities caused friction with local Breton leaders, required continual intervention, for example:

- In 1213, the Bishop of Nantes ordered the Lord of Clisson to compensate the Order for damages caused and for a murder committed;
- In 1222, the excommunication of the Lord of Assérac for denying to release detained Templars.

With the fall of Acre, in 1291 and loss of the Holy Land, much of the Orders’ rationale for existence was lost. The Church therefore wanted the Order to merge with the Knights Hospitallers. This proposal was rejected by the Order increasing its perceived arrogance.

== Intrigue across the Border in France ==
On 13 October 1307, King Philip IV of France had every Templar in his realms arrested and their properties confiscated. News of the charges levied against the Order was greeted with incredulity outside France, particularly in Brittany, England, Portugal and Aragon.

A tradition from the 15th century states that the French sent men to Nantes on 10 August 1308 to take possession of the Orders properties there, but were driven out of the city by a mob who declared that these properties did not belong to the King of France but to the Duke of Brittany.

By March 1312, the Pope finally suppressed the Order completely and its remaining properties was transferred to the Hospitallers or confiscated by local rulers.

== The reaction in Brittany ==
Allegations were used against the Order in Brittany as a pretext to seize property such as:

- In Nantes, a story was spread that wheat from the Orders' warehouse was given to pigs rather than the poor.
- At Guingamp, monks were alleged to have been involved in kidnapping.
- At Ploubalay, the Order had such a bad reputation, that the rectors of neighbouring parishes would ring bells to warn people to guard their livestock and their daughters when they were about.

By May 1313, the Breton assets of the Order were eventually transferred to the Hospitallers; another religious military order.

== Later Impressions of the Order in Brittany ==
Many local legends exist surrounding the Order in Brittany but it is unlikely that they date from 12th Century. The traditions from the 17th century seem to have been ambivalent but by the 18th and 19th centuries, the Order became portrayed in a more negative light.

The Order had become known as the red monks; a title not connected with the colour of their tunic but more with the devil, traditions depicting them as ungodly, arrogant or debauched such as:

- In Belle-Isle-en-Terre, local legend mention a mounted red monk, with fire spewing from the horse's nostrils, that descends from an outcrop outside the village and riding into the river: whosoever saw this apparition was thought to die within the year.
- In Monbran, another legend has it that a secret tunnel runs from a tower to a chapel and in it, treasure. Apparently a templar lives in the tower, so old that he prowls the countryside at night with his beard flung over his shoulder.
