= Canton of Dinan =

Canton of France

Coordinates: 48.45°N 2.05°W

The canton of Dinan is an administrative division of the Côtes-d'Armor department, in northwestern France. It was created at the French canton reorganisation which came into effect in March 2015. Its seat is in Dinan.

It consists of the following communes:

1. Aucaleuc
2. Dinan
3. Quévert
4. Trélivan
5. Vildé-Guingalan
