= Quévert =

Quévert Kever
- Commune
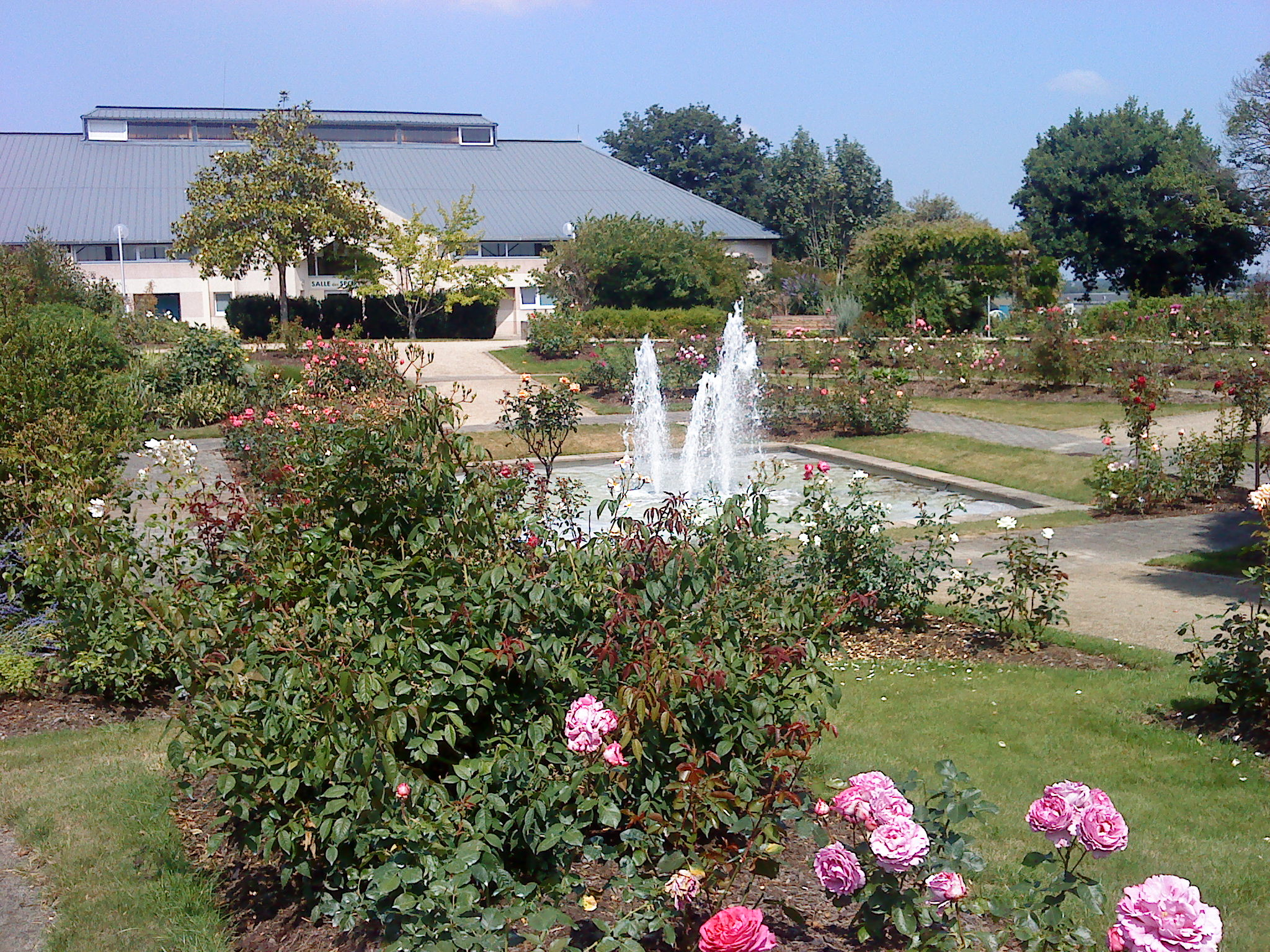
- The Courtil des senteurs in Quévert
- Location of Quévert
- Location within France Location within Brittany
- Coordinates: 48°27′52″N 2°05′09″W
- Country: France
- Region: Brittany
- Department: Côtes-d'Armor
- Arrondissement: Dinan
- Canton: Dinan
- Intercommunality: Dinan Agglomération

Government
  - Mayor (2020–2026): Philippe Landuré
- Area^{1}: 12.48 km^{2} (4.82 sq mi)
- Highest elevation: 130 m (430 ft)
- Lowest elevation: 49 m (161 ft)
- Population (2023): 3,955
  - Density: 316.9/km^{2} (820.8/sq mi)
- Time zone: UTC+01:00 (CET)
  - Summer (DST): UTC+02:00 (CEST)
- INSEE/Postal code: 22259 /22100
- ^{1} French Land Register data, which excludes lakes, ponds, glaciers > 1 km^{2} (0.386 sq mi or 247 acres) and river estuaries.

Quévert (French pronunciation: [kevɛʁ]; Breton: Kever; Gallo: Qevèr) is a commune in the Côtes-d'Armor (Aodoù-an-Arvor) department of Brittany in northwestern France.

== Population ==
Inhabitants of Quévert are called quévertois in French.

Historical population
Year	Pop.	±% p.a.
1968	1,542	—
1975	2,579	+7.62%
1982	2,924	+1.81%
1990	3,007	+0.35%
1999	3,118	+0.40%
2007	3,448	+1.27%
2012	3,719	+1.52%
2017	3,749	+0.16%
2023	3,955	+0.90%
Source: INSEE

== See also ==
- Communes of the Côtes-d'Armor department
