= Saint-Jacut Abbey =

Abbey in Côtes-d'Armor, France

Coordinates: 48.6029°N 2.1909°W

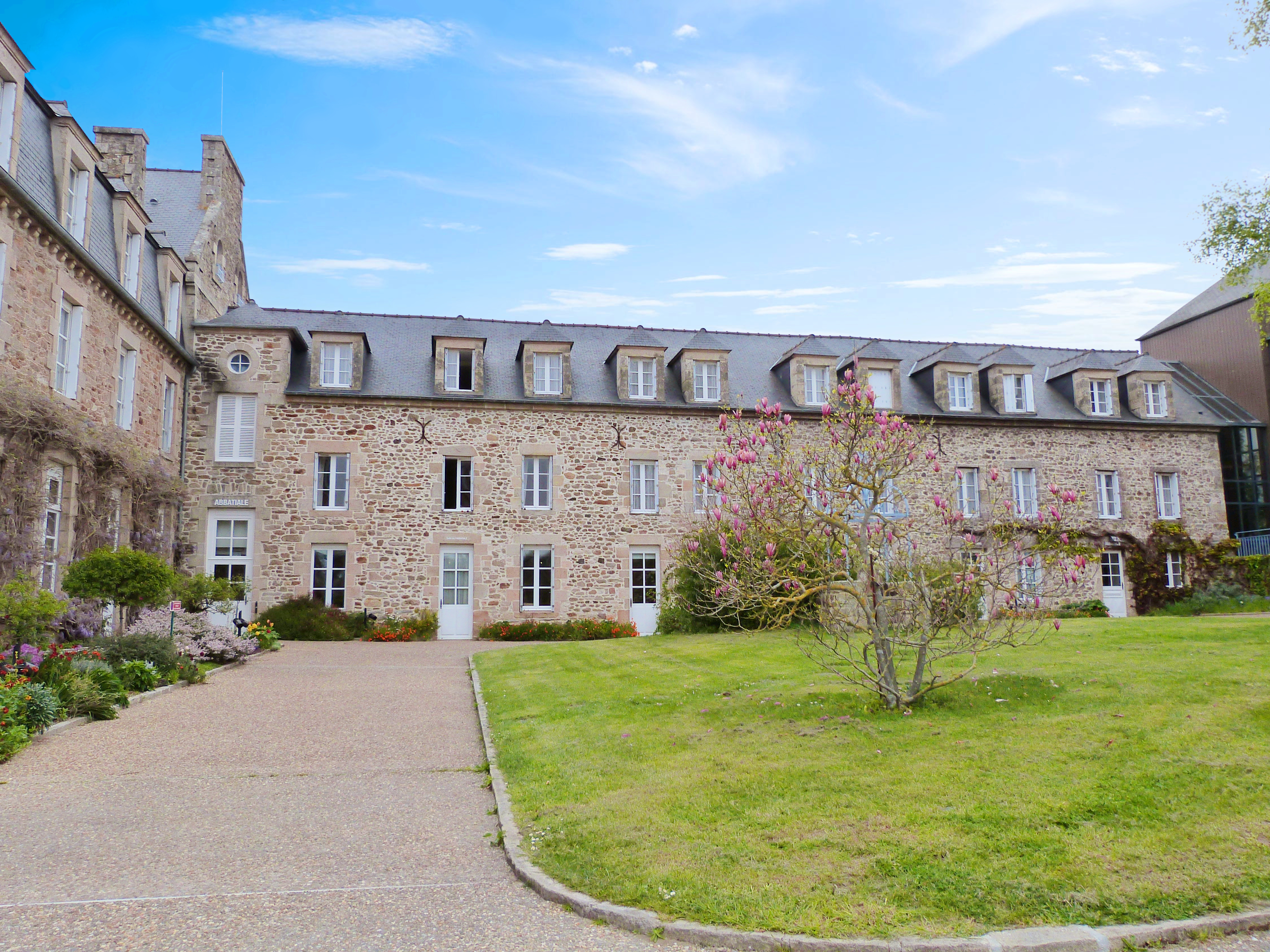
Saint-Jacut Abbey

Saint-Jacut Abbey (French: Abbaye de Saint-Jacut) is located in the east of the Côtes-d'Armor department in Brittany, at the end of the peninsula of Saint-Jacut-de-la-Mer. It is named after the 5th-century Saint Jacut. It is now a retreat and holiday centre run by a community of the Sisters of the Immaculate of Saint-Méen-le-Grand.

== First and second abbeys ==
The early records of the first monastery, traditionally founded by Saint Jacut himself and following the Rule of St Columbanus, were destroyed by the Normans in the late 9th century, with the monastery itself. It is not clear if it had adopted the Rule of St Benedict before its destruction. It was re-founded as a Benedictine abbey in 1008. When it was dissolved in 1790 during the French Revolution only four monks sere living there, and the buildings were so ruinous that no purchaser could be found for them. The archives were dispersed and lost.

In the 1870s the premises were acquired by the Sisters of the Immaculate of Saint-Méen-le-Grand to use as a free school for the poor children of Saint-Jacut. To support the school they decided to accommodate summer visitors taking a change of air on medical advice, which they did from 1876, very successfully..

In the 1950s, the community developed a spiritual retreat programme, and grew thereafter into a retreat and spiritual conference and training centre.
