= Aucaleuc =

Aucaleuc Oskaleg
- Commune
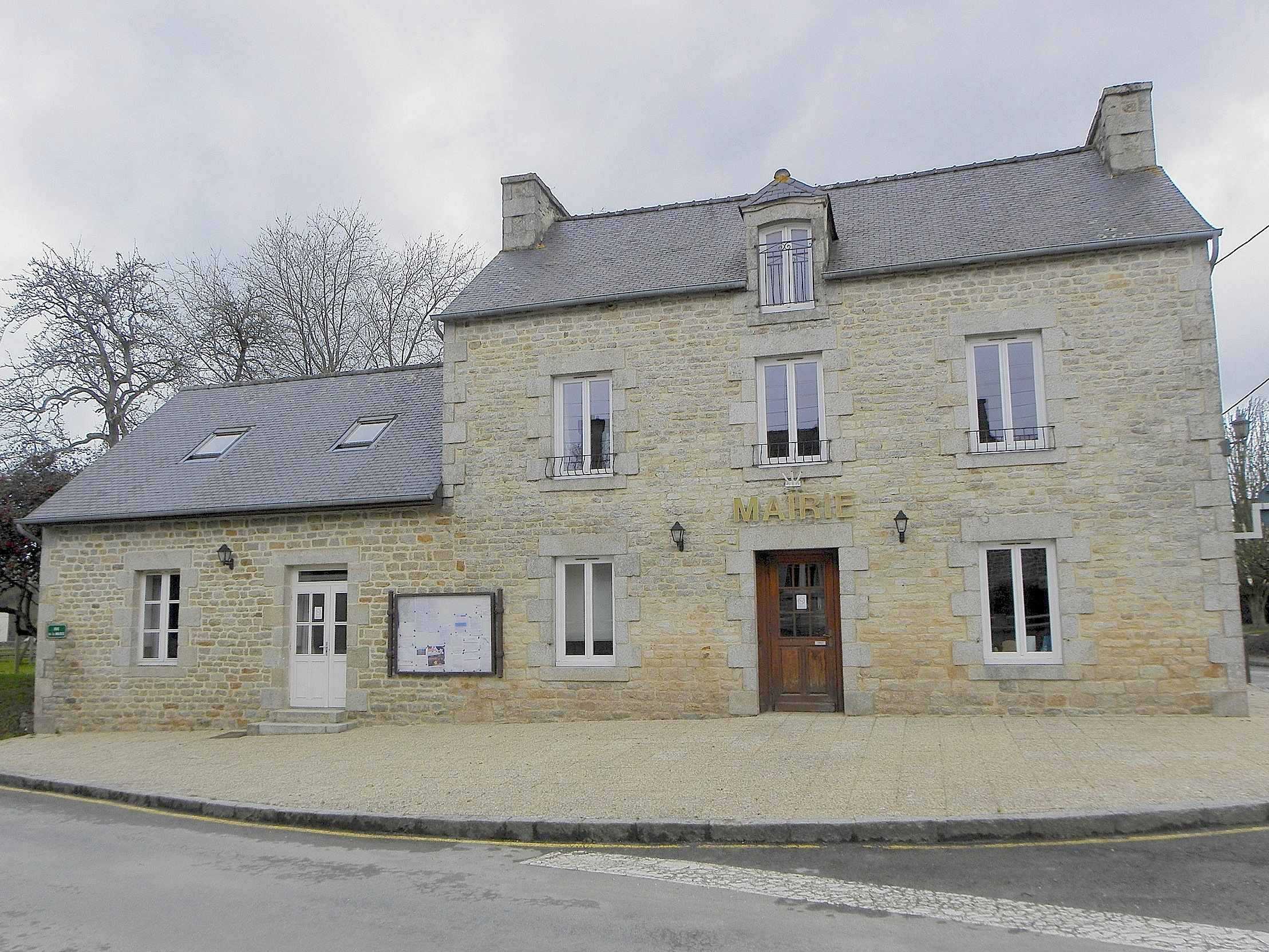
- The town hall in Aucaleuc

- Coat of arms
- Location of Aucaleuc
- Location within France Location within Brittany
- Coordinates: 48°27′25″N 2°07′42″W
- Country: France
- Region: Brittany
- Department: Côtes-d'Armor
- Arrondissement: Dinan
- Canton: Dinan
- Intercommunality: Dinan Agglomération

Government
  - Mayor (2020–2026): Christophe Ollivier
- Area^{1}: 6.38 km^{2} (2.46 sq mi)
- Highest elevation: 120 m (390 ft)
- Lowest elevation: 68 m (223 ft)
- Population (2023): 973
  - Density: 153/km^{2} (395/sq mi)
- Time zone: UTC+01:00 (CET)
  - Summer (DST): UTC+02:00 (CEST)
- INSEE/Postal code: 22003 /22100
- ^{1} French Land Register data, which excludes lakes, ponds, glaciers > 1 km^{2} (0.386 sq mi or 247 acres) and river estuaries.

Aucaleuc (French pronunciation: [okalœk]; Breton: Oskaleg; Gallo: Laugaloec) is a commune in the Côtes-d'Armor department of Brittany in north-western France.

== Population ==
Historical population
Year	Pop.	±% p.a.
1968	337	—
1975	452	+4.28%
1982	536	+2.46%
1990	601	+1.44%
1999	629	+0.51%
2007	867	+4.09%
2012	904	+0.84%
2017	943	+0.85%
2023	973	+0.52%
Source: INSEE

The inhabitants of Aucaleuc are known as Aucaleuens in French.

== See also ==
- Communes of the Côtes-d'Armor department
