= Vildé-Guingalan =

Vildé-Guingalan Gwilde-Gwengalon
- Commune
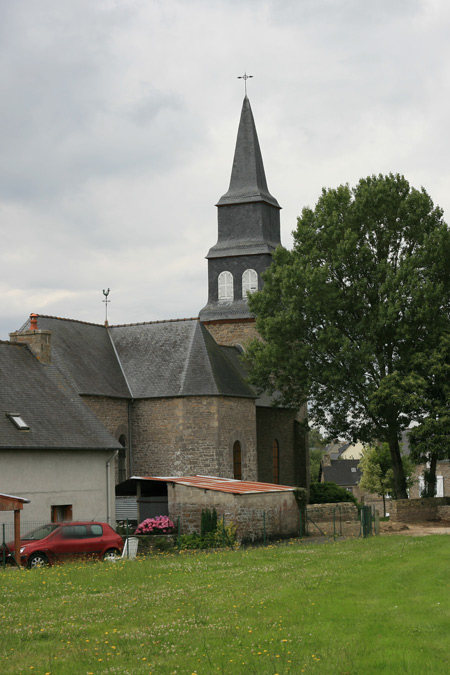
- The church in Vildé-Guingalan
- Location of Vildé-Guingalan
- Location within France Location within Brittany
- Coordinates: 48°26′19″N 2°09′26″W
- Country: France
- Region: Brittany
- Department: Côtes-d'Armor
- Arrondissement: Dinan
- Canton: Dinan
- Intercommunality: Dinan Agglomération

Government
  - Mayor (2020–2026): Jean-Yves Juhel
- Area^{1}: 7.35 km^{2} (2.84 sq mi)
- Highest elevation: 117 m (384 ft)
- Lowest elevation: 53 m (174 ft)
- Population (2023): 1,304
  - Density: 177/km^{2} (460/sq mi)
- Time zone: UTC+01:00 (CET)
  - Summer (DST): UTC+02:00 (CEST)
- INSEE/Postal code: 22388 /22980
- ^{1} French Land Register data, which excludes lakes, ponds, glaciers > 1 km^{2} (0.386 sq mi or 247 acres) and river estuaries.

Vildé-Guingalan (French pronunciation: [vilde ɡɛ̃ɡalɑ̃]; Breton: Gwilde-Gwengalon; Gallo: Vildéu-Gengalan) is a commune in the Côtes-d'Armor department of Brittany in northwestern France.

== Population ==
Historical population
Year	Pop.	±% p.a.
1968	594	—
1975	644	+1.16%
1982	793	+3.02%
1990	820	+0.42%
1999	878	+0.76%
2007	1,154	+3.48%
2012	1,233	+1.33%
2017	1,241	+0.13%
2023	1,304	+0.83%
Source: INSEE

The inhabitants of Vildé-Guingalan are known in French as vildéens.

== See also ==
- Communes of the Côtes-d'Armor department
