= Charles Josselin =

French politician (1938–2026)

Member of the French Senate for Côtes-d'Armor
- In office 24 September 2006 – 21 September 2008
- Preceded by: Pierre-Yvon Trémel

Minister Delegate for Cooperation and Francophonie
- In office 4 June 1997 – 6 May 2002
- President: Jacques Chirac
- Prime Minister: Lionel Jospin
- Preceded by: Jacques Godfrain; Margie Sudre
- Succeeded by: Pierre-André Wiltzer

Secretary of State for the Sea
- In office 4 April 1992 – 30 March 1993
- President: François Mitterrand
- Prime Minister: Pierre Bérégovoy
- Preceded by: Jean-Yves Le Drian
- Succeeded by: Nicole Ameline

Secretary of State for Transport
- In office 15 November 1985 – 20 March 1986
- President: François Mitterrand
- Prime Minister: Laurent Fabius
- Preceded by: Jean Auroux
- Succeeded by: Jacques Douffiagues

Deputy of the French National Assembly
- In office 2 April 1993 – 4 July 1997
- Preceded by: Jean Gaubert
- Succeeded by: Jean Gaubert
- Constituency: Côtes-d'Armor's 2nd constituency
- In office 2 April 1986 – 4 May 1992
- Preceded by: constituency re-established
- Succeeded by: Jean Gaubert
- Constituency: proportional representation (1986–1988); Côtes-d'Armor's 2nd constituency (1988–1992)
- In office 2 July 1981 – 16 December 1985
- Preceded by: René Benoît
- Succeeded by: Jean Gaubert
- Constituency: Côtes-d'Armor's 2nd constituency
- In office 2 April 1973 – 1 April 1978
- Preceded by: René Pleven
- Succeeded by: René Benoît
- Constituency: Côtes-d'Armor's 2nd constituency

Member of the European Parliament for France
- In office 17 July 1979 – 15 July 1981
- Succeeded by: Henri Saby

Mayor of Pleslin-Trigavou
- In office 22 March 1977 – 19 Juny 1997
- Preceded by: Jean Ohier
- Succeeded by: Jean-Paul Leroy

President of the General Council of Côtes-d'Armor
- In office 17 March 1976 – 4 June 1997
- Preceded by: René Pleven
- Succeeded by: Claudy Lebreton

Member of the General Council of Côtes-d'Armor for the Canton of Ploubalay
- In office 3 October 1973 – 2 April 2015
- Preceded by: Ernest Rouxel
- Succeeded by: constituency abolished

Member of the Regional Council of Brittany
- In office January 1974 – 1985

Personal details
- Born: 31 March 1938 Pleslin-Trigavou, France
- Died: 1 September 2026 (aged 88)
- Party: PS (1971–2026)
- Education: University of Rennes 1 (Lic.); Sciences Po
- Occupation: Economist

Charles Josselin (French: [ʃaʁl ʒɔslˈɛ̃]; 31 March 1938 – 1 September 2026) was a French politician of the Socialist Party (PS).

Having been elected to the National Assembly in 1973, he held multiple political offices, including Deputy of the National Assembly, President of the General Council of Côtes-d'Armor, and Secretary of State for Transport. At various times in his political career he was a member of the European Parliament, the Regional Council of Brittany and the French Senate. He was linked to the Côtes-d'Armor region throughout.

As mayor of Pleslin-Trigavou he handled the Amoco Cadiz oil spill in 1978. In 1993 during his term as the Secretary of State for the Sea he secured parliamentary approval for reform to dockers' labor rights. In the 2000s he negotiated with francophone African nations in his role as Minister Delegate for Cooperation and Francophonie.

== Early life, family and education ==
Josselin was born in Pleslin-Trigavou on 31 March 1938 into a family of farmers. He earned a licentiate from the University of Rennes 1; there, he joined the Union Nationale des Étudiants de France.

== Career ==
He published a brochure against the Algerian War and supported reconciliation with the National Liberation Front. After law school in Rennes and further studies at the Sciences Po, he was employed from 1965 to 1968 as a financial secretary with the Banque de l'Union Parisienne.

In 1971, he joined the PS and entered politics in 1973, following his election to the National Assembly in Côtes-d'Armor's 2nd constituency, defeating incumbent René Pleven by 51 votes. In 1976, he became president of the General Council of Côtes-d'Armor, a capacity in which he served until 1997. He was defeated in the 1978 legislative election by René Benoît before returning in 1981. From 1979 to 1981, he served as a member of the European Parliament. In his capacity as mayor of Pleslin-Trigavou, he handled the Amoco Cadiz oil spill, where Royal Dutch Shell was ordered to pay 220 million francs to the Breton municipalities and 1.05 billion francs to the French state in compensation for the damage caused by the oil spill. As president of the General Council of Côtes-d'Armor, he oversaw the renaming of the department from Côtes-du-Nord to Côtes-d'Armor.

From 1985 to 1986, Josselin served as Secretary of State for Transport under Prime Minister Laurent Fabius before returning to the National Assembly, where he served from 1986 to 1992. He then served as Secretary of State for the Sea under Prime Minister Pierre Beregovoy. He secured parliamentary approval for reform to dockers' labor rights, merging them with those of standard French laws. However, he faced opposition from the General Confederation of Labour for his monopolistic power over the hiring of dockers. His chief of staff was notably future Prime Minister Bernard Cazeneuve.

In 1997, Josselin was named Minister Delegate for Cooperation and Francophonie, where he served as chair of the Commission on Decentralized Cooperation within the Assembly of the Departments of France. In January 2000, he travelled to the Central African Republic, the Republic of the Congo, and Chad, reiterating France's African policy as one of "neither interference nor indifference", expressing a desire for the end of French inverventionism on the continent. He had been awarded a distinction by President of Cameroon Paul Biya in 1998 when France was drafting a debt relief plan for Yaoundé. He did not stand in the 2002 legislative election, but held a seat in the Senate from 2006 to 2008 following the death of Pierre-Yvon Trémel.

== Legal troubles ==
On 4 April 2008, Josselin was convicted of breach of trust by a criminal court in Paris for the improper use of two government vehicles during his time as president of the General Council of Côtes-d'Armor, as well as fuel and highway toll costs, resulting in a loss of 99,000 francs. Prosecuted alongside Claudy Lebreton and Alain Gouriou, he was exempted from punishment due to the fact that he had remedied these offenses and the events were "isolated incidents" and had occurred "long ago".

== Personal life and death ==
Josselin died on 1 September 2026, at the age of 88.

== Medals ==
- Honour medal of railroads
