= 2024 French legislative election in Côtes-d'Armor =

Following the first round of the 2024 French legislative election on 30 June 2024, runoff elections in each constituency where no candidate received a vote share greater than 50 percent were scheduled for 7 July. Candidates permitted to stand in the runoff elections needed to either come in first or second place in the first round or achieve more than 12.5 percent of the votes of the entire electorate (as opposed to 12.5 percent of the vote share due to low turnout).

== Côtes-d'Armor ==
=== 1st constituency ===
| Candidate | Party or alliance | | First round | | Second round | |
| Candidate | Party or alliance | | Votes | % | Votes | % |
|---|---|---|---|---|---|---|
| Mickaël Cosson | Ensemble | Democratic Movement | 21,614 | 32.96 | 27,186 | 41.45 |
| Marion Gorgiard | New Popular Front | La France Insoumise | 19,926 | 30.38 | 20,845 | 31.78 |
| Françoise Billaud | National Rally | | 16,888 | 25.75 | 17,560 | 26.77 |
| Bernard Croguennec | The Republicans | | 3,635 | 5.54 | | |
| Aourell Danjou | Ecologists | Independent | 1,806 | 2.75 | | |
| Alain Le Fol | Far-left | Lutte Ouvrière | 671 | 1.02 | | |
| Virginie Mattasoglio | Miscellaneous centre | Regionalists | 552 | 0.84 | | |
| Hervé Denis | Far-left | Independent | 488 | 0.74 | | |
| Total | | | 65,580 | 100.00 | 65,591 | 100.00 |
| Valid votes | | | 65,580 | 97.51 | 65,591 | 97.16 |
| Invalid votes | | | 535 | 0.80 | 516 | 0.76 |
| Blank votes | | | 1,142 | 1.70 | 1,404 | 2.08 |
| Total votes | | | 67,257 | 100.00 | 67,511 | 100.00 |
| Registered voters/turnout | | | 90,639 | 74.20 | 90,642 | 74.48 |

=== 2nd constituency ===
| Candidate | Party or alliance | | First round | | Second round | |
| Candidate | Party or alliance | | Votes | % | Votes | % |
|---|---|---|---|---|---|---|
| Hervé Berville | Ensemble | Renaissance | 25,730 | 33.61 | 47,119 | 63.63 |
| Antoine Kieffer | National Rally | | 23,707 | 30.96 | 26,935 | 36.37 |
| Jérémy Dauphin | New Popular Front | The Ecologists | 19,685 | 25.71 | | |
| Michel Desbois | Miscellaneous right | The Republicans | 5,946 | 7.77 | | |
| Logan Maheu | Regionalists | | 859 | 1.12 | | |
| Lucie Herblin | Far-left | Lutte Ouvrière | 636 | 0.83 | | |
| Total | | | 76,563 | 100.00 | 74,054 | 100.00 |
| Valid votes | | | 76,563 | 97.91 | 74,054 | 94.47 |
| Invalid votes | | | 676 | 0.86 | 1,244 | 1.59 |
| Blank votes | | | 958 | 1.23 | 3,090 | 3.94 |
| Total votes | | | 78,197 | 100.00 | 78,388 | 100.00 |
| Registered voters/turnout | | | 104,517 | 74.82 | 104,528 | 74.99 |

=== 3rd constituency ===
| Candidate | Party or alliance | | First round | | Second round | |
| Candidate | Party or alliance | | Votes | % | Votes | % |
|---|---|---|---|---|---|---|
| Corentin Le Fur | The Republicans | | 20,520 | 31.96 | 41,619 | 67.97 |
| Odile de Mellon | National Rally | | 18,345 | 28.57 | 19,616 | 32.03 |
| Antoine Ravard | New Popular Front | Socialist Party | 14,717 | 22.92 | | |
| Lucas Clément | Ensemble | Renaissance | 9,127 | 14.21 | | |
| Jean-Pierre Lamour | Far-left | Lutte Ouvrière | 451 | 0.70 | | |
| Bryan Tyli | Regionalists | Independent | 447 | 0.70 | | |
| Gabrielle Gatien | Independent | | 426 | 0.66 | | |
| Emmanuel Rouxel | Regionalists | Independent | 178 | 0.28 | | |
| Total | | | 64,211 | 100.00 | 61,235 | 100.00 |
| Valid votes | | | 64,211 | 97.90 | 61,235 | 94.26 |
| Invalid votes | | | 581 | 0.89 | 1,131 | 1.74 |
| Blank votes | | | 795 | 1.21 | 2,595 | 3.99 |
| Total votes | | | 65,587 | 100.00 | 64,961 | 100.00 |
| Registered voters/turnout | | | 89,421 | 73.35 | 89,422 | 72.65 |

=== 4th constituency ===
| Candidate | Party or alliance | | First round | | Second round | |
| Candidate | Party or alliance | | Votes | % | Votes | % |
|---|---|---|---|---|---|---|
| Noël Lude | National Rally | | 19,700 | 34.30 | 23,333 | 45.25 |
| Murielle Lepvraud | New Popular Front | La France Insoumise | 17,826 | 31.03 | 28,234 | 54.75 |
| Cyril Jobic | Ensemble | Renaissance | 17,555 | 30.56 | | |
| Sylvie Lironcourt | Far-left | Lutte Ouvrière | 1,505 | 2.62 | | |
| Danielle Le Men | Reconquête | | 854 | 1.49 | | |
| Total | | | 57,440 | 100.00 | 51,567 | 100.00 |
| Valid votes | | | 57,440 | 96.31 | 51,567 | 87.27 |
| Invalid votes | | | 757 | 1.27 | 2,385 | 4.04 |
| Blank votes | | | 1,441 | 2.42 | 5,136 | 8.69 |
| Total votes | | | 59,638 | 100.00 | 59,088 | 100.00 |
| Registered voters/turnout | | | 81,566 | 73.12 | 81,561 | 72.45 |

=== 5th constituency ===
| Candidate | Party or alliance | | First round | | Second round | |
| Candidate | Party or alliance | | Votes | % | Votes | % |
|---|---|---|---|---|---|---|
| Eric Bothorel | Ensemble | Renaissance | 29,479 | 37.81 | 32,463 | 41.21 |
| Marielle Lemaitre | New Popular Front | La France Insoumise | 23,858 | 30.60 | 23,385 | 29.69 |
| Jean-Yves Le Boulanger | National Rally | | 22,668 | 29.08 | 22,919 | 29.10 |
| Yann Guéguen | Far-left | Lutte Ouvrière | 1,953 | 2.51 | | |
| Total | | | 77,958 | 100.00 | 78,767 | 100.00 |
| Valid votes | | | 77,958 | 96.59 | 78,767 | 97.04 |
| Invalid votes | | | 971 | 1.20 | 679 | 0.84 |
| Blank votes | | | 1,784 | 2.21 | 1,725 | 2.13 |
| Total votes | | | 80,713 | 100.00 | 81,171 | 100.00 |
| Registered voters/turnout | | | 107,761 | 74.90 | 107,757 | 75.33 |
