= Marc Le Fur =

French politician (born 1956)

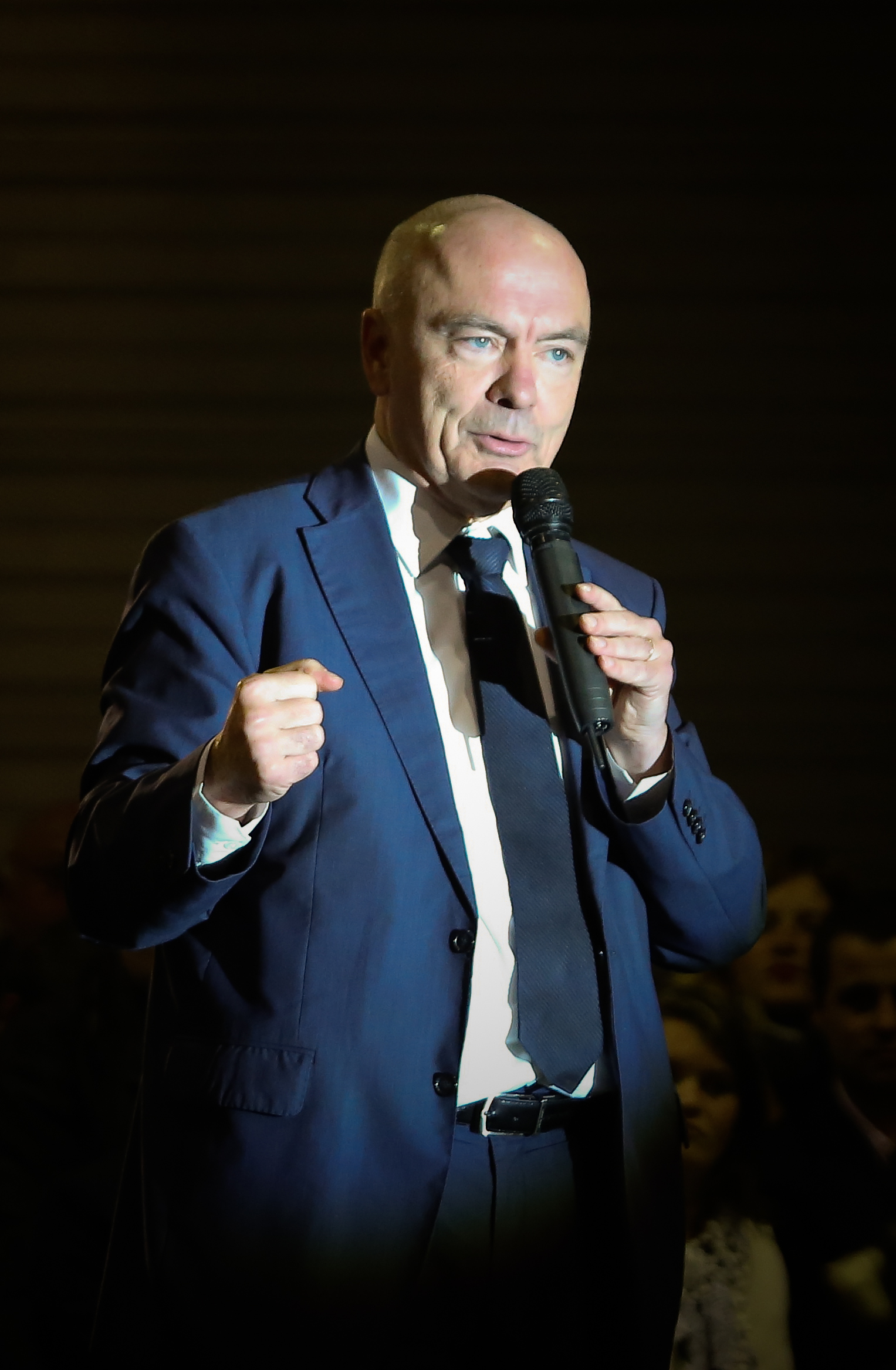

Member of the National Assembly for Côtes-d'Armor's 3rd constituency
- In office 19 June 2002 – 9 June 2024
- Preceded by: Didier Chouat
- Succeeded by: Corentin Le Fur
- In office 2 April 1993 – 21 April 1997
- Preceded by: Didier Chouat
- Succeeded by: Didier Chouat

Member of the Regional Council of Brittany
- Incumbent
- Assumed office 18 December 2015
- In office 20 March 1998 – 1 April 2004

Personal details
- Born: Marc Marie Le Fur; 28 November 1956 (age 69) Dakar, French West Africa (current-day Senegal)
- Party: Rally for the Republic (until 2002); Union for a Popular Movement (2002–2015); The Republicans (2015–present)
- Children: 5, including Corentin
- Education: Sciences Po; École nationale d'administration
- Occupation: Civil servant

Marc Marie Le Fur (French pronunciation: [maʁk lə fyʁ]; born 28 November 1956) is a French civil servant and politician who represented the 3rd constituency of the Côtes-d'Armor department in the National Assembly from 1993 to 1997 and again from 2002 to 2024.

A member of The Republicans (LR) and its predecessor parties, he has been a member of the Regional Council of Brittany since 2015, previously holding a seat from 1998 to 2004. Le Fur also was the member of the General Council of Côtes-d'Armor for the canton of Quintin from 2001 to 2015.

== Early career ==
A 1983 graduate of the École nationale d'administration, Le Fur joined the corps préfectoral within the French Civil Service with the rank of subprefect. He also worked at the Ministry of the Economy and Finance and the Ministry of the Interior.

== Political career ==
Le Fur first entered the National Assembly in 1993, winning the 3rd constituency of Côtes-d'Armor seat, before losing it in 1997 and regaining it in 2002. He held one of the six vice presidencies of the National Assembly (2007–2012; 2012–2017; 2017–2022) until the end of the 15th legislature of the Fifth Republic; as such he was part of the National Assembly's Bureau. He served on the Finance Committee until his retirement at the end of the 16th legislature.

In addition to his committee assignments, Le Fur presided over the French-Cameroonian Parliamentary Friendship Group (2022–2024). He was also a delegate to the Assemblée parlementaire de la Francophonie (2002–2007; 2023–2024).

He announced having been diagnosed with cancer and retired from Parliament in 2024. He was succeeded by his son Corentin Le Fur.

Le Fur has been a member of the Regional Council of Brittany since 2015, where he previously held a seat from 1998 to 2004. He also held the seat in the General Council of Côtes-d'Armor from 2001 to 2015 for the canton of Quintin.

== Political positions ==
Le Fur has actively promoted the defence of the regional languages of France. He was an important contributor to the constitutional law of 23 July 2008 which amended the Constitution of France to recognise regional languages as part of France's national heritage in Article 75–1.

He has been a supporter of the attempts to have the Loire-Atlantique department transferred from the Pays de la Loire region to Brittany.

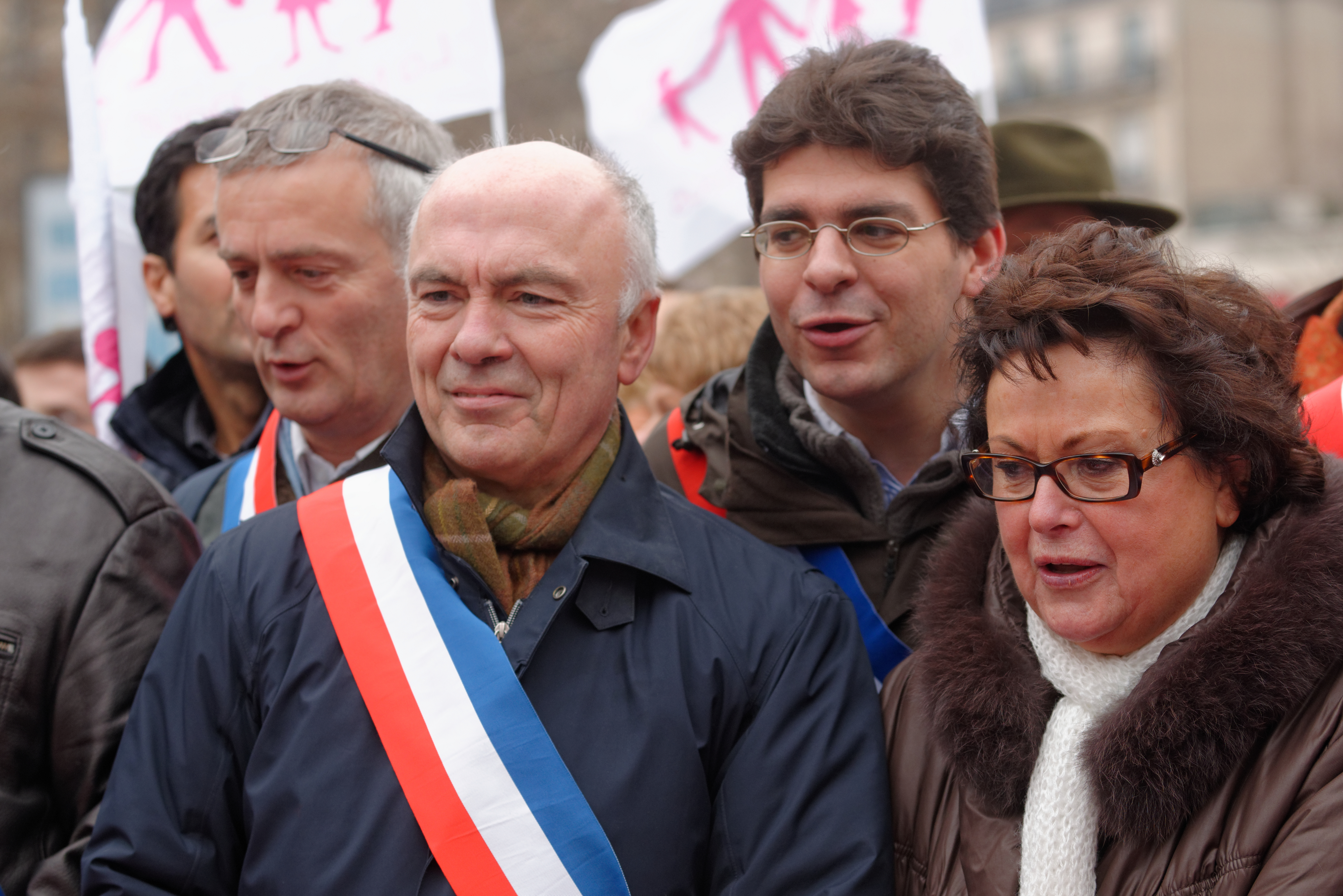
Le Fur and Christine Boutin at a La Manif pour tous demonstration in Paris in January 2013

In April 2013, Le Fur was part of a demonstration in Paris against the legalisation of same-sex marriage in France. A video showed him trying to physically hold back National Gendarmerie personnel as they were attempting to remove protestors sat on the ground. After he failed, Le Fur knocked the hat off a gendarme's head. He later stated he stayed until late in the night wearing his official sash to be recognisable as a deputy alongside other demonstrators to avoid the demonstration being the target of police violence. Later that month, he was sanctioned in the National Assembly along with Yves Albarello and Daniel Fasquelle for their behaviour in Parliament.

In November 2013, Le Fur took part in a Bonnets Rouges demonstration in Quimper against a proposed ecotax.

In the 2016 The Republicans presidential primary, Le Fur supported François Fillon. In The Republicans' 2017 leadership election, he endorsed Laurent Wauquiez for the party leadership. Ahead of the 2022 presidential election, he publicly declared his support for Michel Barnier as The Republicans' candidate.

== Other activities ==
- Caisse des dépôts et consignations, Member of the supervisory board (2024)

== Honours ==
- Knight of the Legion of Honour (2025)
