= Plessix-Balisson =

Plessix-Balisson Ar Genkiz-Yuzhael
- Part of Beaussais-sur-Mer
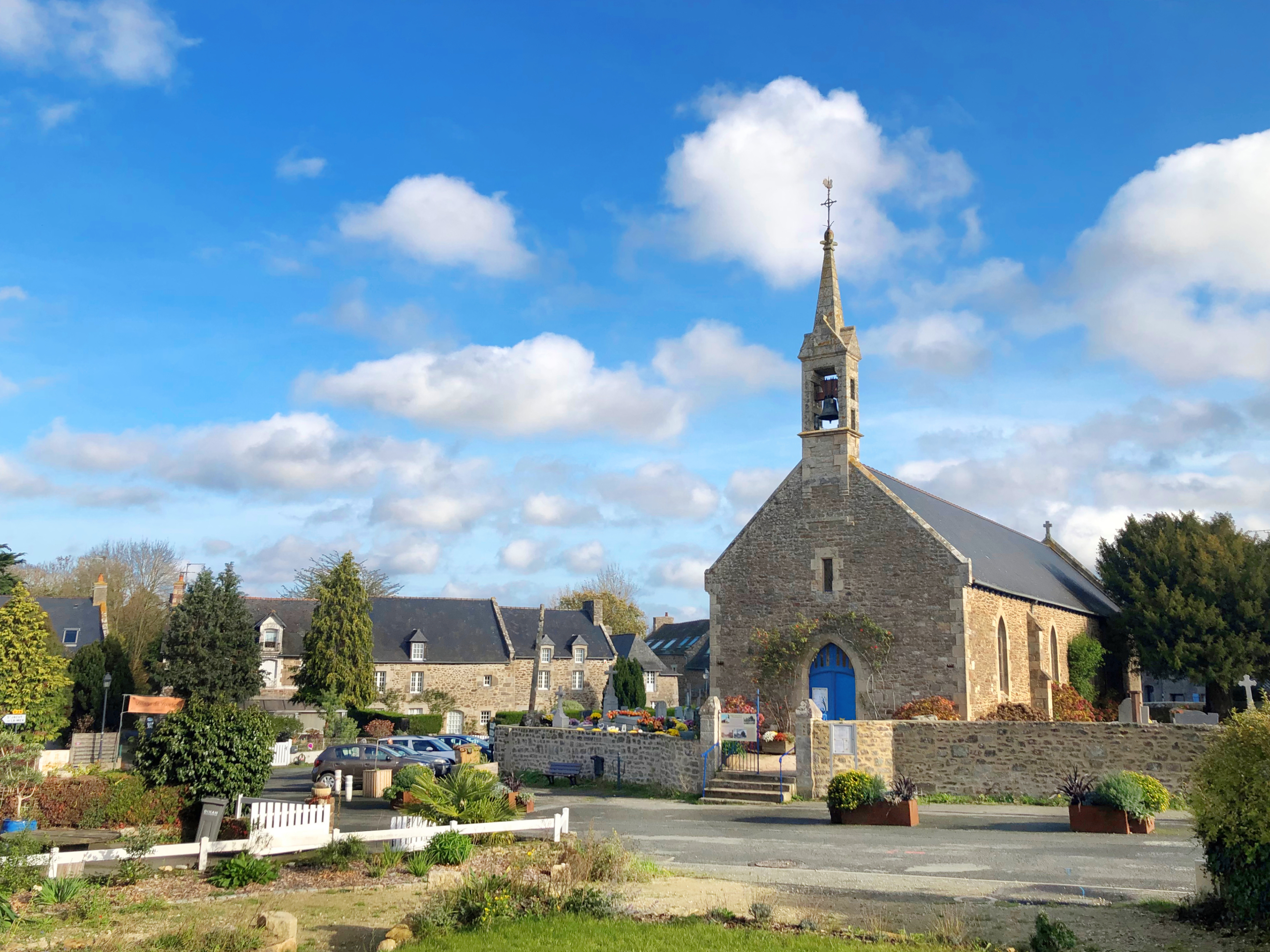

- Coat of arms
- Location of Plessix-Balisson
- Location within France Location within Brittany
- Coordinates: 48°32′N 2°09′W
- Country: France
- Region: Brittany
- Department: Côtes-d'Armor
- Arrondissement: Dinan
- Canton: Pleslin-Trigavou
- Commune: Beaussais-sur-Mer
- Area^{1}: 0.08 km^{2} (0.031 sq mi)
- Highest elevation: 57 m (187 ft)
- Lowest elevation: 35 m (115 ft)
- Population (2023): 83
  - Density: 1,000/km^{2} (2,700/sq mi)
- Time zone: UTC+01:00 (CET)
  - Summer (DST): UTC+02:00 (CEST)
- Postal code: 22650
- ^{1} French Land Register data, which excludes lakes, ponds, glaciers > 1 km^{2} (0.386 sq mi or 247 acres) and river estuaries.

Plessix-Balisson (French pronunciation: [plɛsi balisɔ̃]; Breton: Ar Genkiz-Yuzhael) is a former commune in the Côtes-d'Armor department of Brittany in northwestern France. On 1 January 2017, it was merged into the new commune Beaussais-sur-Mer.

With an area of only eight hectares, Plessix-Balisson was the smallest commune of the region and the second smallest in France, after Castelmoron-d'Albret.

== See also ==
- Communes of the Côtes-d'Armor department
