= Chouat =

Chouat is a surname of French origin. Notable people with the surname include:

- Didier Chouat (1945–2014), French politician
- Francis Chouat (1948–2024), French historian and politician, brother of Didier
