= Le Fur =

Le Fur is a surname. Notable people with the surname include:

- Gérard Le Fur (born 1950), French entrepreneur
- Marc Le Fur (born 1956), French politician
- Marie-Amélie Le Fur (born 1988), French wheelchair athlete
