= Ploubalay =

Ploubalay Plouvalae
- Part of Beaussais-sur-Mer
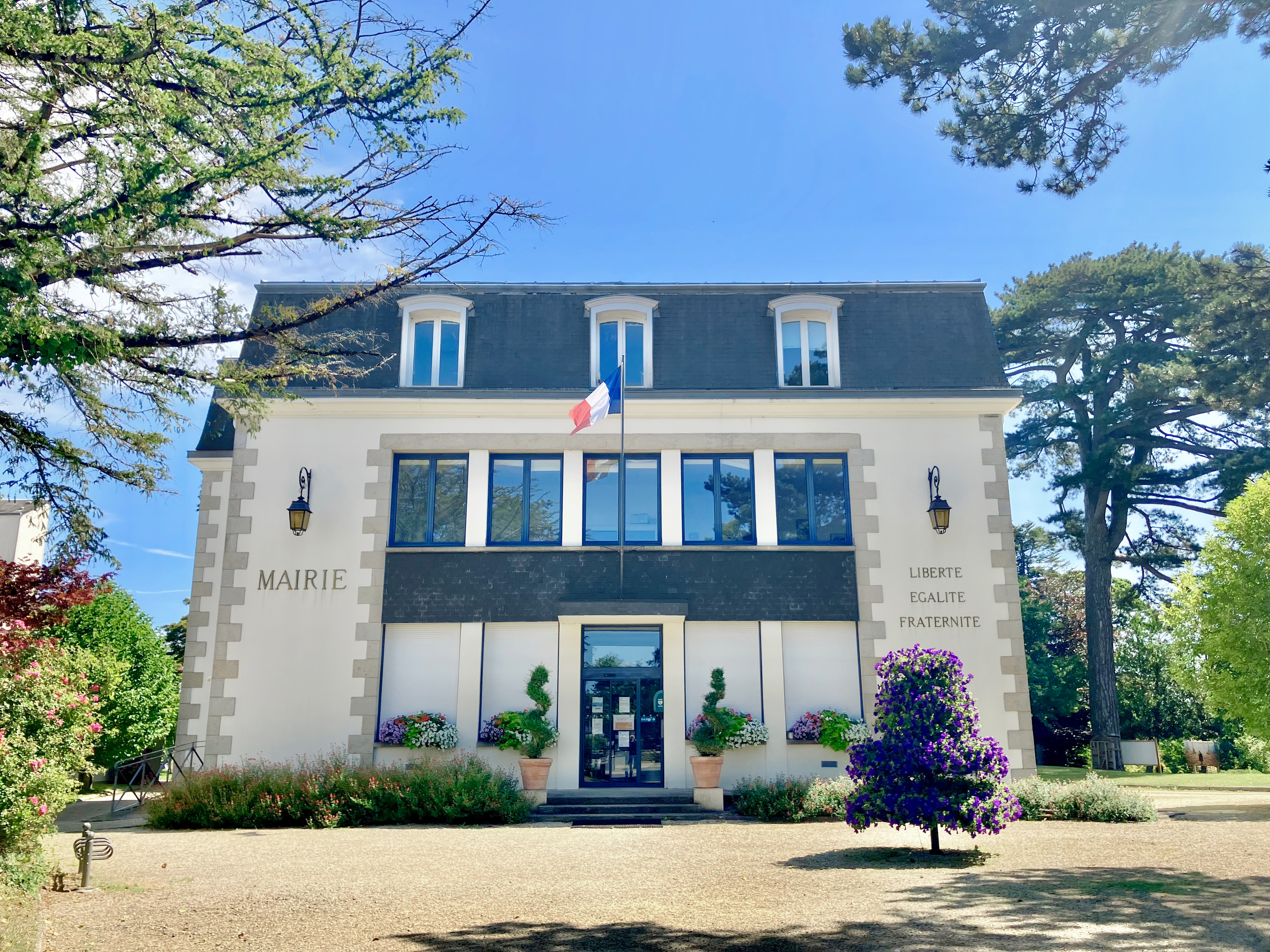
- Town hall

- Coat of arms
- Location of Ploubalay
- Location within France Location within Brittany
- Coordinates: 48°34′51″N 2°08′20″W
- Country: France
- Region: Brittany
- Department: Côtes-d'Armor
- Arrondissement: Dinan
- Canton: Pleslin-Trigavou
- Commune: Beaussais-sur-Mer
- Area^{1}: 35.45 km^{2} (13.69 sq mi)
- Highest elevation: 77 m (253 ft)
- Lowest elevation: 2 m (6.6 ft)
- Population (2022): 3,926
  - Density: 110.7/km^{2} (286.8/sq mi)
- Time zone: UTC+01:00 (CET)
  - Summer (DST): UTC+02:00 (CEST)
- Postal code: 22650
- ^{1} French Land Register data, which excludes lakes, ponds, glaciers > 1 km^{2} (0.386 sq mi or 247 acres) and river estuaries.

Ploubalay (French pronunciation: [plubalɛ]; Breton: Plouvalae) is a small town and former commune in the Côtes-d'Armor department of Brittany in northwestern France. On 1 January 2017, it was merged into the new commune Beaussais-sur-Mer.

== Geography ==
The little town is near the sea but, unusually for this stretch of coast, it has no beach of its own.

For road users, Ploubalay deserves the epithet carrefour des plages/"crossroads of the beaches". It is crossed by the D2 departmental road connecting Dinan with the coast and by the D786 linking Plancoët with Dinard.

== Population ==
Inhabitants of Ploubalay are called ploubalaysiens in French.

Historical population
Year	Pop.	±% p.a.
1968	2,156	—
1975	2,217	+0.40%
1982	2,292	+0.48%
1990	2,334	+0.23%
1999	2,385	+0.24%
2006	2,488	+0.61%
2022	3,926	+2.89%
Source: EHESS and INSEE

== See also ==
- Communes of the Côtes-d'Armor department
