= Trégon =

Trégon Tregon-Poudour
- Part of Beaussais-sur-Mer
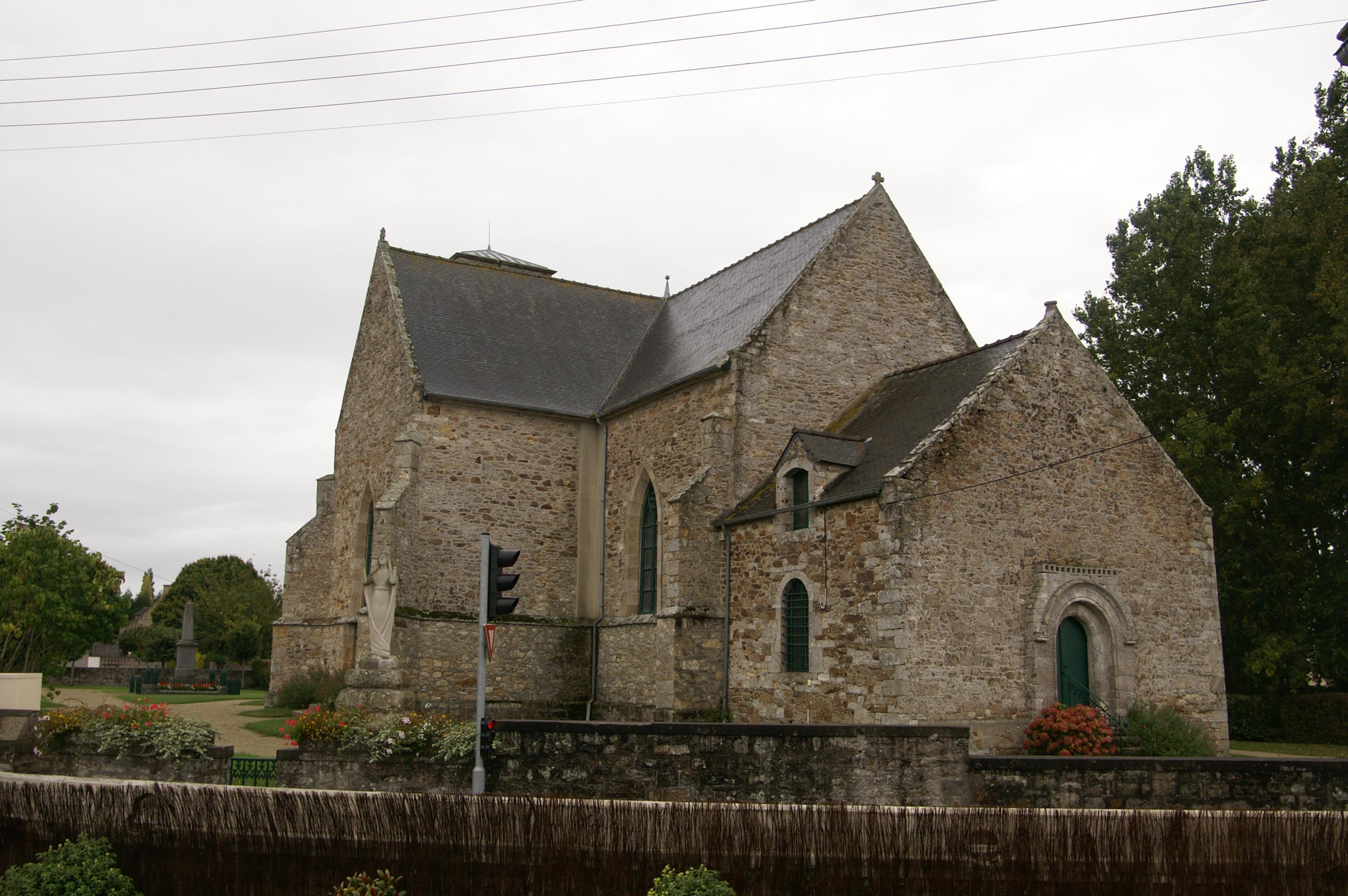

- Coat of arms
- Location of Trégon
- Location within France Location within Brittany
- Coordinates: 48°34′12″N 2°10′57″W
- Country: France
- Region: Brittany
- Department: Côtes-d'Armor
- Arrondissement: Dinan
- Canton: Pleslin-Trigavou
- Commune: Beaussais-sur-Mer
- Area^{1}: 6.12 km^{2} (2.36 sq mi)
- Highest elevation: 52 m (171 ft)
- Lowest elevation: 3 m (9.8 ft)
- Population (2023): 382
  - Density: 62.4/km^{2} (162/sq mi)
- Time zone: UTC+01:00 (CET)
  - Summer (DST): UTC+02:00 (CEST)
- Postal code: 22650
- ^{1} French Land Register data, which excludes lakes, ponds, glaciers > 1 km^{2} (0.386 sq mi or 247 acres) and river estuaries.

Trégon (French pronunciation: [tʁeɡɔ̃]; Breton: Tregon-Poudour) is a former commune in the Côtes-d'Armor department of Brittany in northwestern France. On 1 January 2017, it was merged into the new commune Beaussais-sur-Mer. Inhabitants of Trégon are called trégonnais in French.

== See also ==
- Communes of the Côtes-d'Armor department
