= La Vicomté-sur-Rance =

La Vicomté-sur-Rance Kerveskont
- Commune
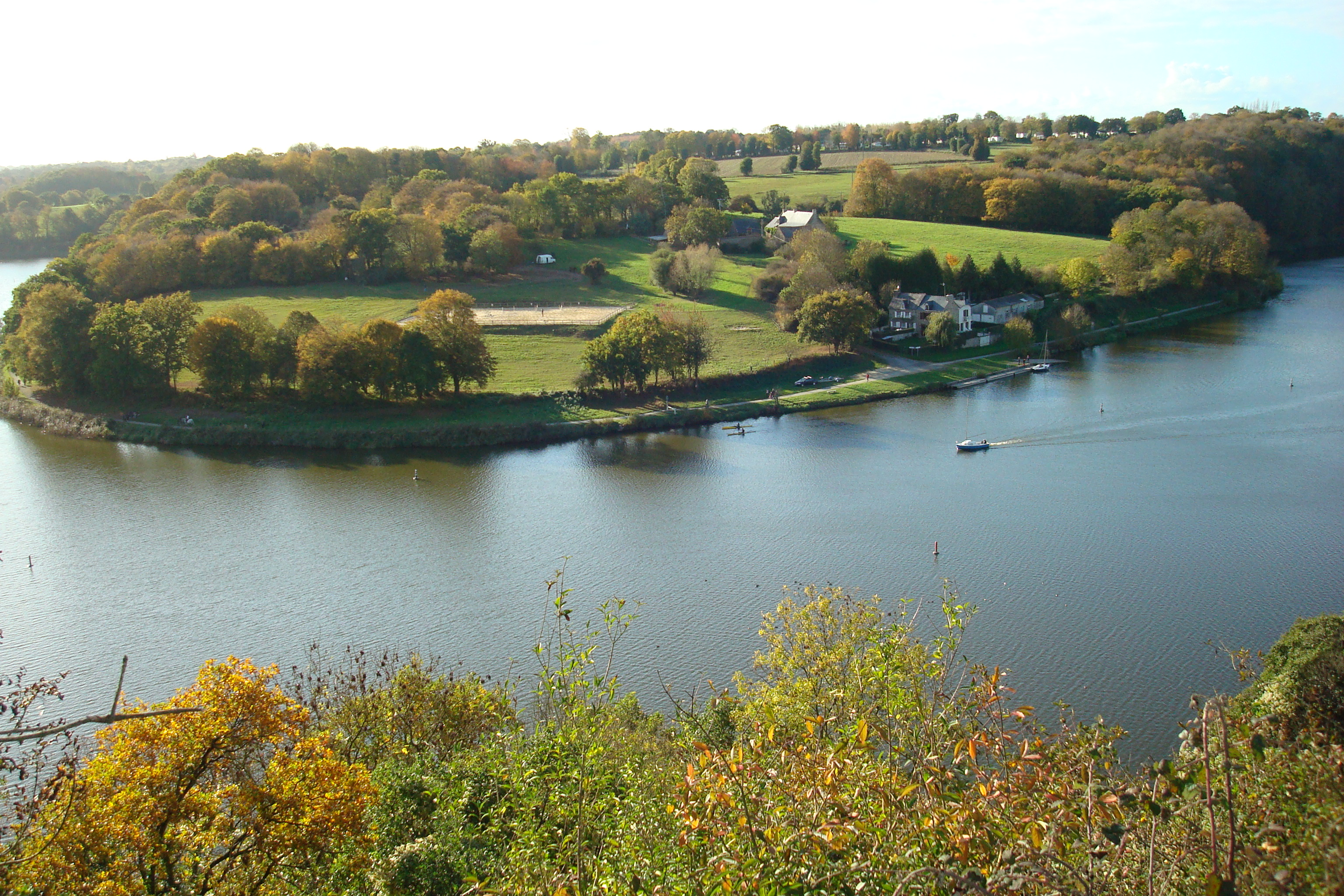
- The Rance river at La Vicomté

- Coat of arms
- Location of La Vicomté-sur-Rance
- Location within France Location within Brittany
- Coordinates: 48°29′22″N 1°58′52″W
- Country: France
- Region: Brittany
- Department: Côtes-d'Armor
- Arrondissement: Dinan
- Canton: Pleslin-Trigavou
- Intercommunality: Dinan Agglomération

Government
  - Mayor (2020–2026): Alain Brombin
- Area^{1}: 4.57 km^{2} (1.76 sq mi)
- Highest elevation: 73 m (240 ft)
- Lowest elevation: 5 m (16 ft)
- Population (2023): 1,149
  - Density: 251/km^{2} (651/sq mi)
- Time zone: UTC+01:00 (CET)
  - Summer (DST): UTC+02:00 (CEST)
- INSEE/Postal code: 22385 /22690
- ^{1} French Land Register data, which excludes lakes, ponds, glaciers > 1 km^{2} (0.386 sq mi or 247 acres) and river estuaries.

La Vicomté-sur-Rance (French pronunciation: [la vikɔ̃te syʁ ʁɑ̃s], literally La Vicomté on Rance; Breton: Kerveskont) is a commune in the Côtes-d'Armor department of Brittany in northwestern France.

== Population ==
Historical population
Year	Pop.	±% p.a.
1968	692	—
1975	726	+0.69%
1982	793	+1.27%
1990	779	−0.22%
1999	770	−0.13%
2007	897	+1.93%
2012	982	+1.83%
2017	1,057	+1.48%
2023	1,149	+1.40%
Source: INSEE

Inhabitants of La Vicomté-sur-Rance are called vicomtois in French.

== See also ==
- Communes of the Côtes-d'Armor department
