= Tréméreuc =

Tréméreuc Tremereg
- Commune
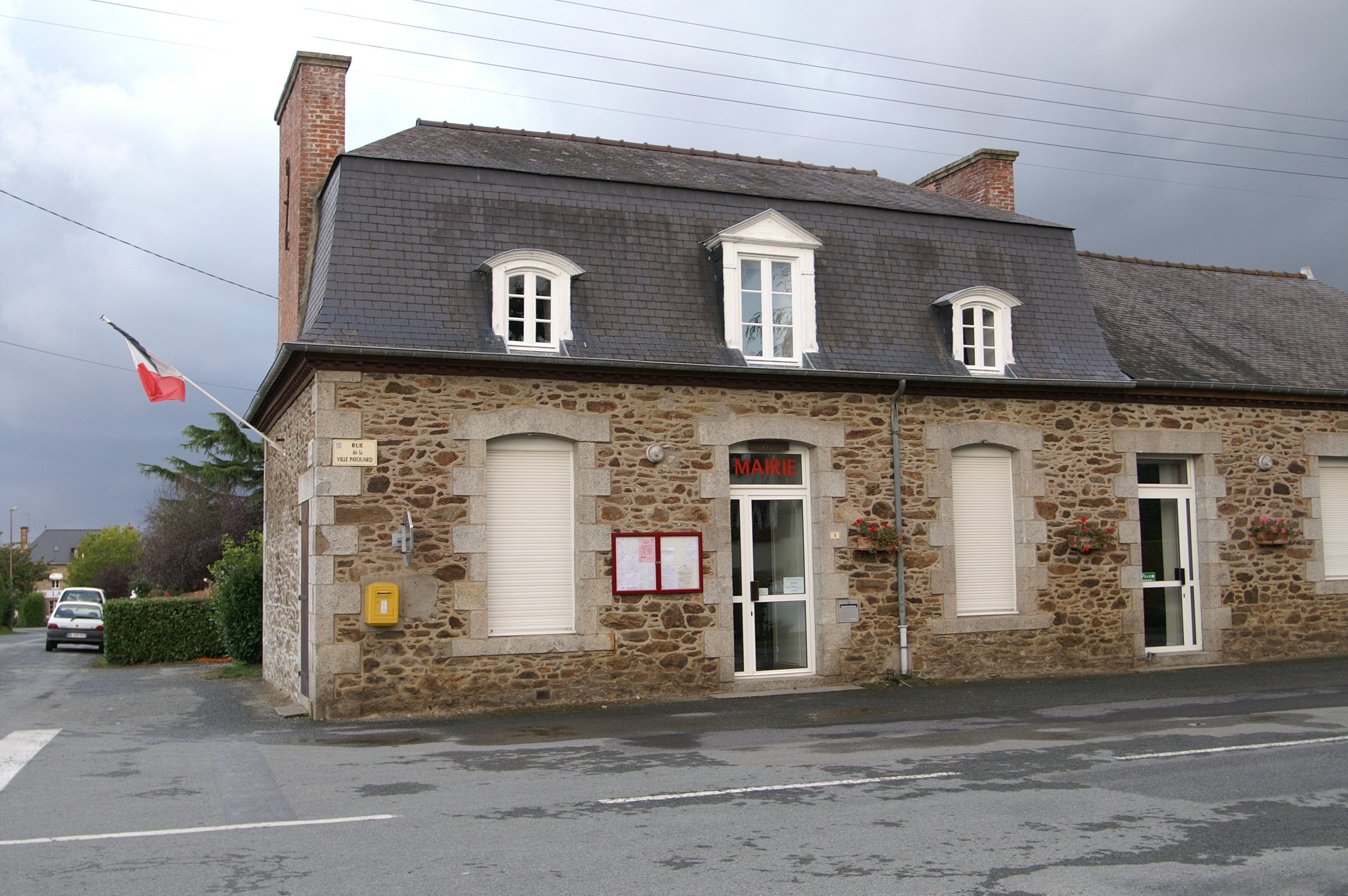
- Town hall

- Coat of arms
- Location of Tréméreuc
- Location within France Location within Brittany
- Coordinates: 48°33′33″N 2°03′51″W
- Country: France
- Region: Brittany
- Department: Côtes-d'Armor
- Arrondissement: Dinan
- Canton: Pleslin-Trigavou

Government
  - Mayor (2020–2026): Bruno Fontaine
- Area^{1}: 4.15 km^{2} (1.60 sq mi)
- Highest elevation: 82 m (269 ft)
- Lowest elevation: 20 m (66 ft)
- Population (2023): 729
  - Density: 176/km^{2} (455/sq mi)
- Time zone: UTC+01:00 (CET)
  - Summer (DST): UTC+02:00 (CEST)
- INSEE/Postal code: 22368 /22490
- ^{1} French Land Register data, which excludes lakes, ponds, glaciers > 1 km^{2} (0.386 sq mi or 247 acres) and river estuaries.

Tréméreuc (French pronunciation: [tʁemeʁøk]; Breton: Tremereg) is a commune in the Côtes-d'Armor department of Brittany in northwestern France.

== Population ==
Historical population
Year	Pop.	±% p.a.
1968	371	—
1975	389	+0.68%
1982	450	+2.10%
1990	560	+2.77%
1999	566	+0.12%
2007	577	+0.24%
2012	674	+3.16%
2017	744	+2.00%
2023	729	−0.34%
Source: INSEE

Inhabitants of Tréméreuc are called tréméreucois in French.

== See also ==
- Communes of the Côtes-d'Armor department
