= Saint-Samson-sur-Rance =

Commune in Côtes-d'Armor, Brittany, France

Saint-Samson-sur-Rance Sant-Samzun (Breton)
- Commune
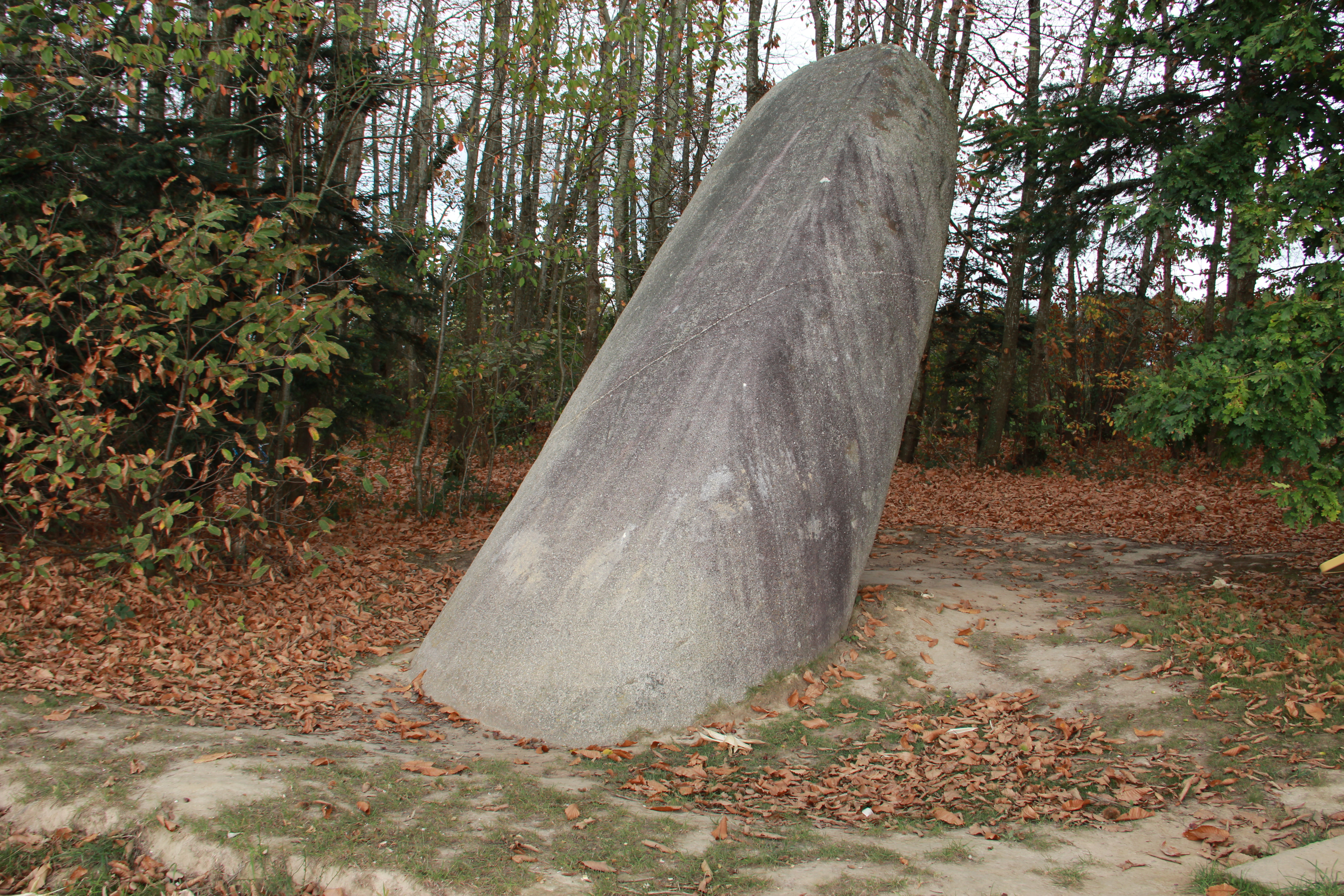
- Menhir

- Coat of arms
- Location of Saint-Samson-sur-Rance
- Location within France Location within Brittany
- Coordinates: 48°29′32″N 2°01′47″W
- Country: France
- Region: Brittany
- Department: Côtes-d'Armor
- Arrondissement: Dinan
- Canton: Pleslin-Trigavou
- Intercommunality: Dinan Agglomération

Government
  - Mayor (2020–2026): Loïc Lorre
- Area^{1}: 6.27 km^{2} (2.42 sq mi)
- Highest elevation: 78 m (256 ft)
- Lowest elevation: 4 m (13 ft)
- Population (2023): 1,625
  - Density: 259/km^{2} (671/sq mi)
- Demonym: samsonnais
- Time zone: UTC+01:00 (CET)
  - Summer (DST): UTC+02:00 (CEST)
- INSEE/Postal code: 22327 /22100
- Website: https://www.saint-samson-sur-rance.fr/
- ^{1} French Land Register data, which excludes lakes, ponds, glaciers > 1 km^{2} (0.386 sq mi or 247 acres) and river estuaries.

Saint-Samson-sur-Rance (French pronunciation: [sɛ̃ sɑ̃sɔ̃ syʁ ʁɑ̃s], literally Saint-Samson on Rance; Breton: Sant-Samzun) is a commune in the Côtes-d'Armor department of Brittany in northwestern France.

== Geography ==
Saint-Samson-sur-Rance is located on the banks of the Rance river, near the town of Dinan, about 20 miles (32 km) from Dinard and Saint-Malo, and 45 minutes from Saint-Brieuc and Rennes by car.

== Toponymy ==
The locality is named after Saint Samson of Dol.

== History ==
The presence of the menhir de la Tremblais indicates that humans have lived in this area since at least the Neolithic.

In the Middle Ages, the parish of Saint-Samson-jouxte-Livet, enclosed in the Bishopric of Saint-Malo, was part of the Ancient Diocese of Dol.

In 1790, during the French Revolution, the parish was named Saint-Samson and elected as a commune.

On 25 July 1962 the commune was renamed to Saint-Samson-sur-Rance.

== Population ==
Historical population
Year	Pop.	±% p.a.
1968	477	—
1975	548	+2.00%
1982	874	+6.90%
1990	1,180	+3.82%
1999	1,151	−0.28%
2007	1,469	+3.10%
2012	1,531	+0.83%
2017	1,607	+0.97%
2023	1,625	+0.19%
Source: INSEE

Inhabitants of Saint-Samson-sur-Rance are called samsonnais in French.

== Gallery ==
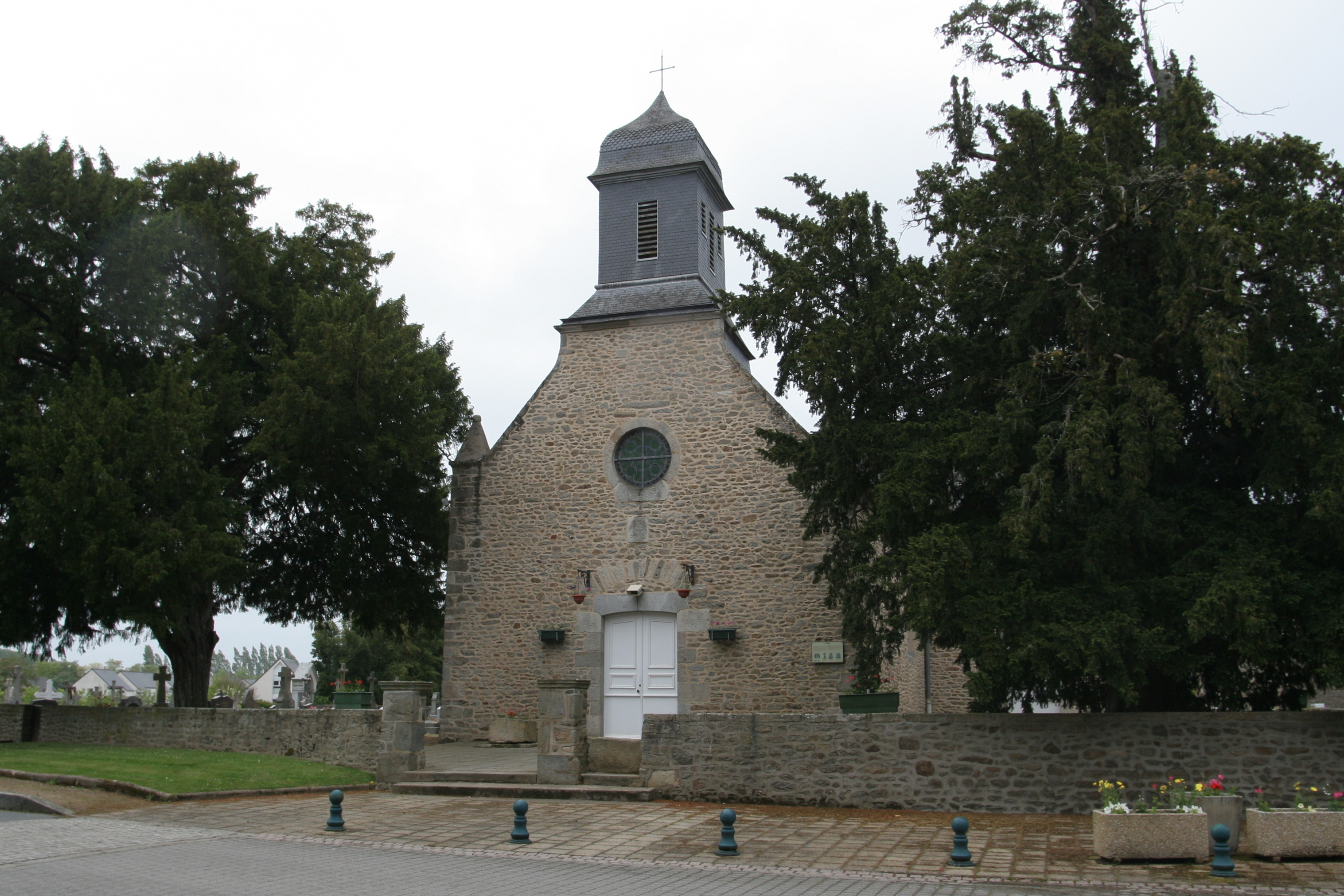
Exterior of the Saint Samson church

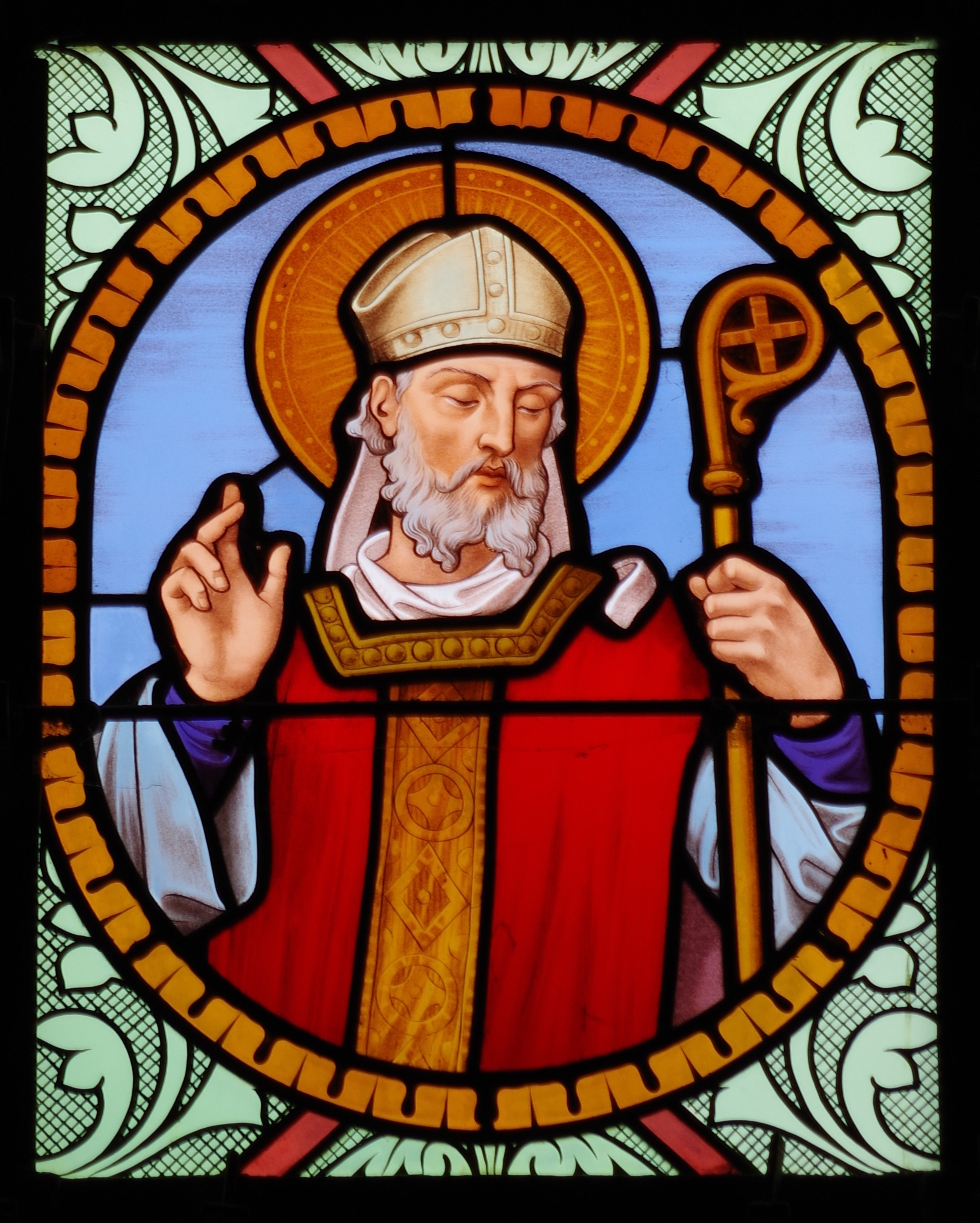
Saint Samson depicted in stained glass in the Saint Samson church

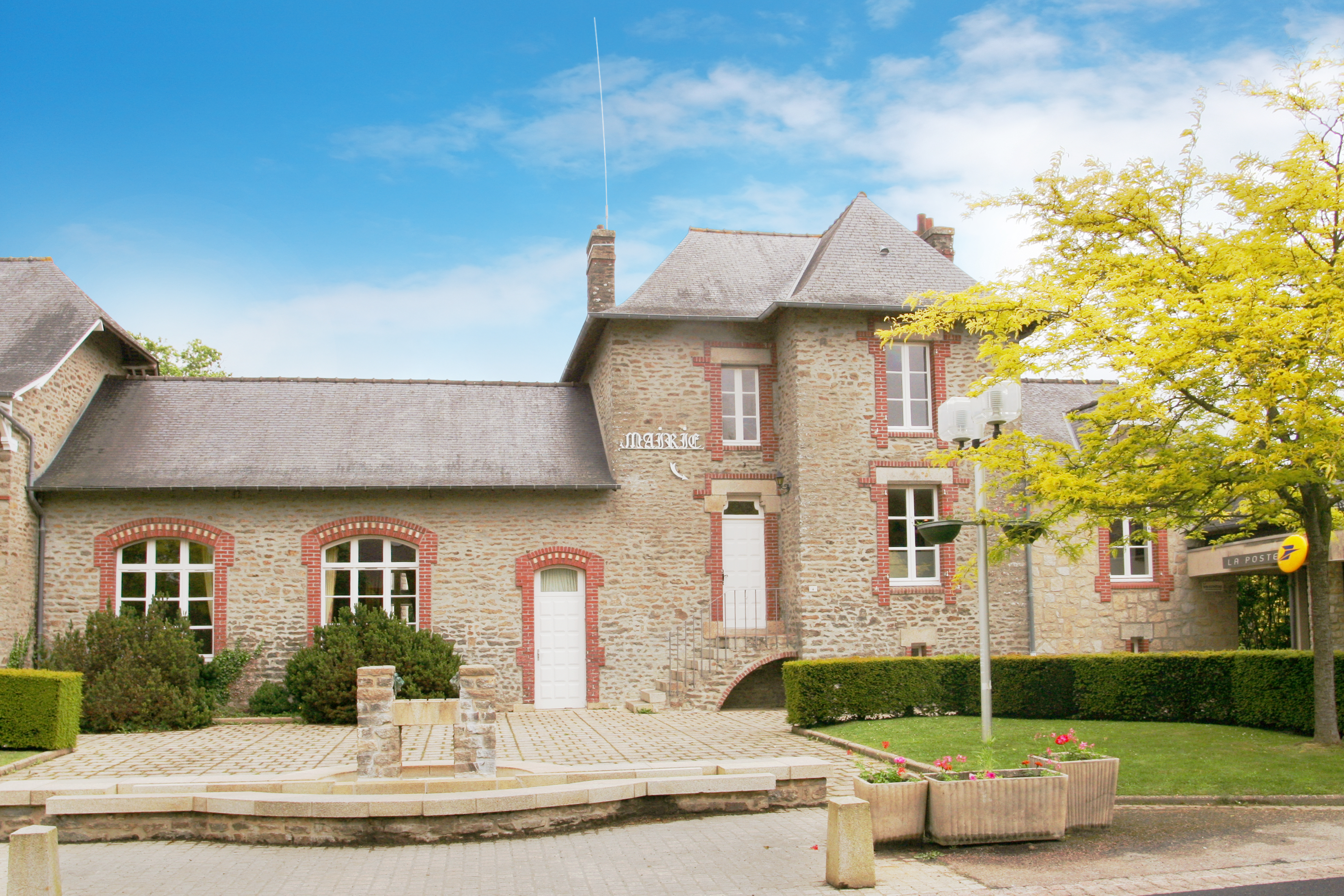
Town hall

== See also ==
- Communes of the Côtes-d'Armor department
- Menhir de la Tiemblais, French article for the rock shown at the top of the article
