= Marie-Madeleine Dienesch =

French politician

Marie-Madeleine Dienesch MEP
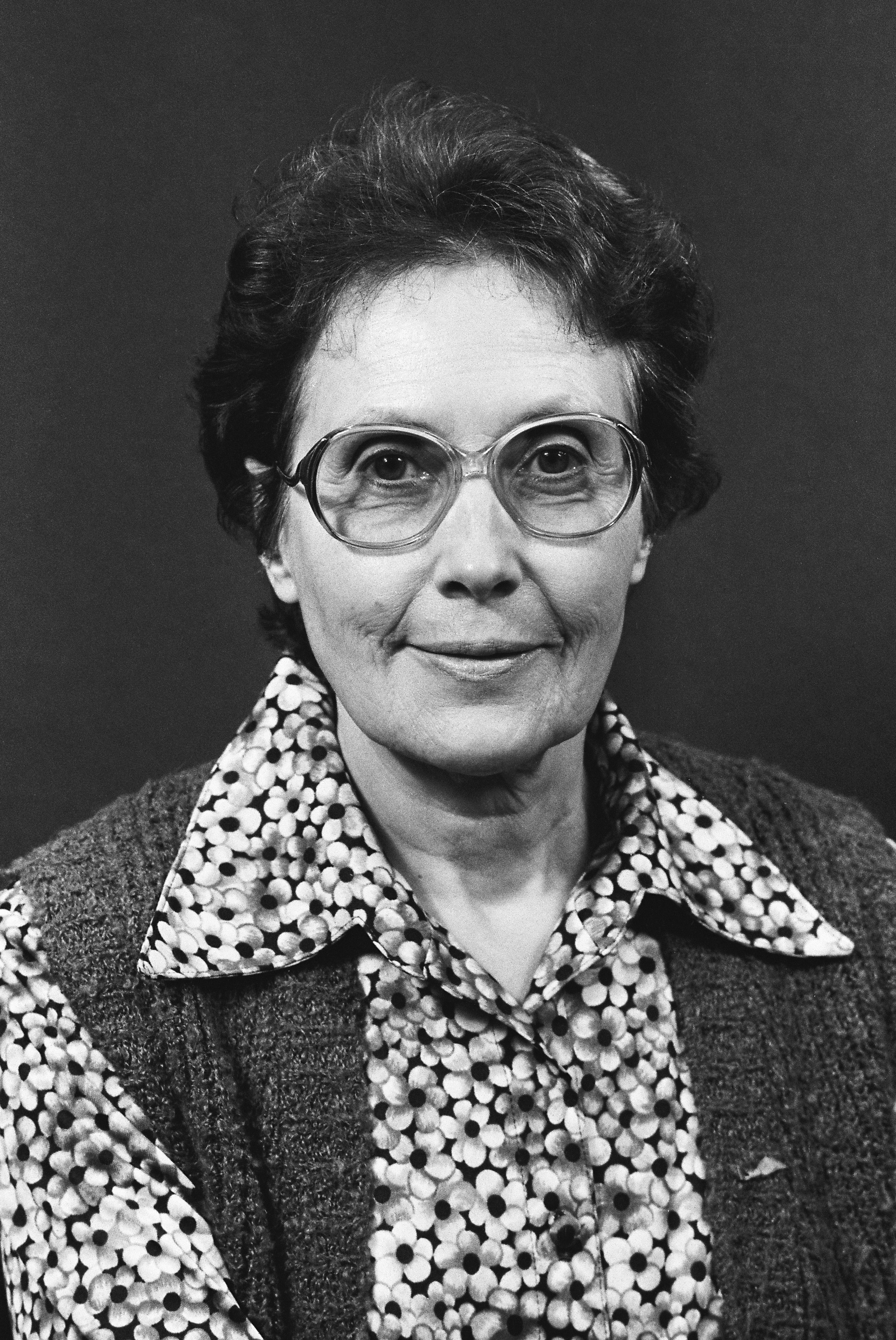

Member of the European Parliament
- In office 17 July 1979 – 30 September 1980

Personal details
- Born: 3 April 1914 Cairo, Egypt
- Died: 8 January 1998 (aged 83) Paris
- Party: Popular Republican Movement; Union of Democrats for the Republic; Rally for the Republic
- Education: University of Paris

Marie-Madeleine Dienesch (1914–1998) was a French politician who was a member of the National Assembly of France and a member of the European Parliament over a period of 35 years. She was the second woman to be a French minister.

== Life ==
Born in Cairo, Egypt, Dienesch moved to France at a young age, and attended a girls' college in Neuilly-sur-Seine before graduating from the University of Paris. She was a teacher during World War II, and after the war ended she began to get involved in politics.

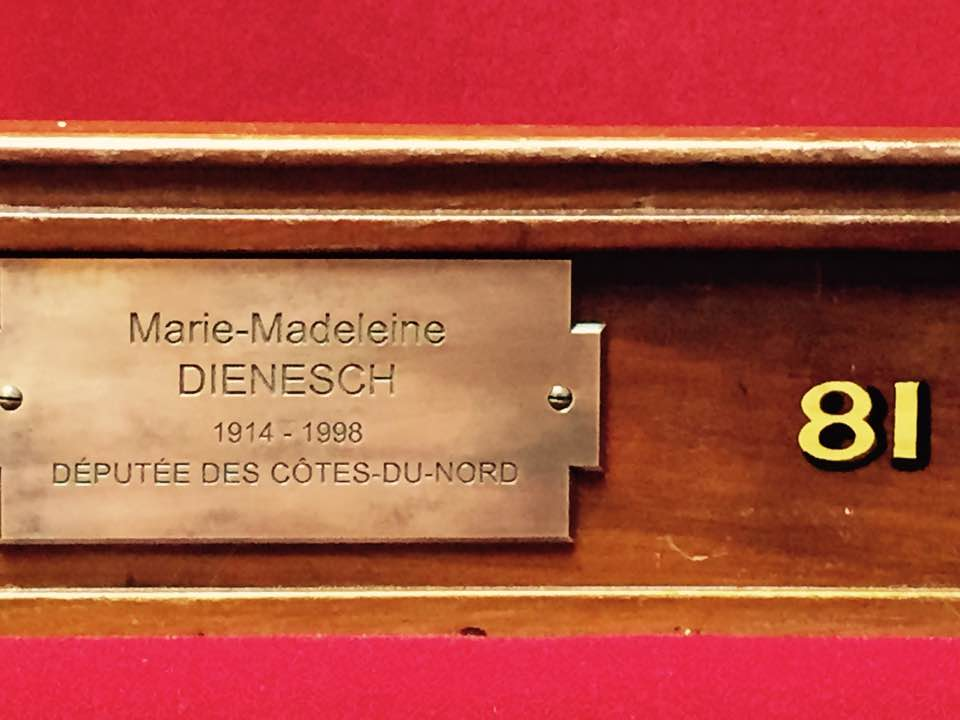
A plaque in the National Assembly

Dienesch was elected to the French Fourth Republic parliament out of Côtes-d'Armor's 3rd constituency in November 1945, and she served in that position through 1981. She supported the Presidency of Charles de Gaulle en route to the founding of the Fifth French Republic in 1958, and as one of the few women actively in politics through the Fourth Republic, she became a regional leader for the Popular Republican Movement.

In 1968, she became the second female government minister in France after Nafissa Sid Cara when she was named State Secretary for National Education, a position that allowed her to sit in on cabinet meetings. She served in that position for three months, then served as Secretary of State for Social Assistance and Rehabilitation from 1968 to 1974. From 1975 to 1978, Dienesch was named the French Ambassador to Luxembourg, and in 1979 she was elected to the European Parliament, and was a member of the European Progressive Democrats. She resigned from the position a year later, and retired from politics in 1981.
