= Honour medal of railroads =

Honour medal for railroads
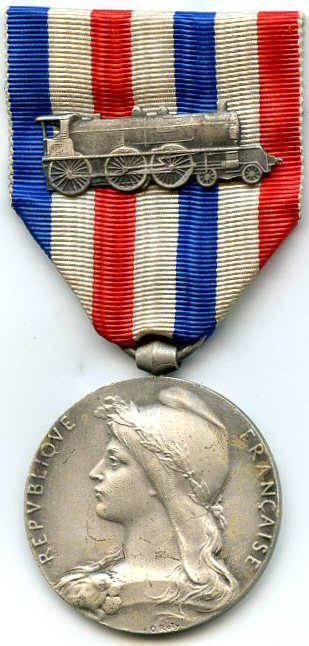
- Honour medal for railroads in silver, 1913-1939 variant (obverse)
- Type: Medal
- Awarded for: Long service with the railroads
- Country: France
- Presented by: the Minister of the Interior
- Eligibility: French and foreign nationals
- Status: Currently awarded
- Established: 19 August 1913

The Honour medal of railroads (French: "médaille d’honneur des chemins de fer") is a state decoration bestowed by the French Republic in the form of an honour medal for work. It was originally meant to reward, depending on the quality and length of time calculated in calendar years, the services rendered by French agents and labourers and to nationals of the French Union or protectorates, in service with the railroads. The Honour medal of railroads was created by decree on 19 August 1913 as a reward for thirty years of service. Since then, many modifications were instituted by consecutive decrees amending the original text.

== Award statute ==
The Honour medal of railroads used to be awarded to salaried labourers, French nationals or citizens of another state of the European Community, in service or having served with the railroads at the national or local level in continental France, Corsica or in an overseas department, or detached abroad. The medal could also be awarded to both French and foreign nationals under contract, and serving with the National society of French railways (SNCF) on the national territory and to foreign citizens under contract representing the SNCF abroad. It is now only awarded to salaried labourers and retired salaried labourers of rail transport enterprises operating in continental France.

The medal may be awarded posthumously. Also, any military veteran, holder of the Order of the Legion of Honour, of the Médaille militaire or of the Resistance Medal, or of any grade of the National Order of Merit and two wartime awards, will be awarded the silver gilt level for twenty-five years of service and the gold level for thirty years of service.

The Honour medal of railroads may also be bestowed for exceptional acts of bravery and courage carried out during official duties for the railways.

All past state secretaries and ministers for transport receive the gold level award.

== Award levels ==
The Honour medal of railroads is currently divided into three levels:

- Silver: 25 years of service;
- Silver gilt: 35 years of service;
- Gold: 38 years of service.

These time criteria are reduced respectively to 20, 30 and 33 years of service for train engineers that can attest to at least 15 years in that position. Awardees also receive a scroll attesting to the award.

== Award variations and descriptions ==
| Time period | Bronze | Silver | Silver gilt | Gold |
|---|---|---|---|---|
| 1913 – 1939 | — | | Photo required | — |
| 1913 – 1939 | — | | | — |
| 1939 – 1953 | — | | | — |
| 1939 – 1953 | — | | | — |
| 1953 – 1977 | Photo required | | — | |
| 1953 – 1977 | | | — | |
| Since 1977 | — | | | |
| Since 1977 | — | | | |

=== Type 1 award (1913-1939) ===
A 32mm in diameter circular silver or silver gilt (from 1919) medal. The design was from Oscar Roty, a famous period engraver of coinage and stamps. The medal hung from a ribbon passing through a suspension ring itself passing through a barrel shaped suspension affixed to the top of the medal. The silk moiré ribbon was 37mm wide with seven equal vertical stripes of blue-white-red-white-blue-white-red. The original 1913 ribbon bore the golden-yellow silk sewn-in image of a steam locomotive, replaced in 1919 by a metallic clasp in the form of a steam locomotive, silver or gilt depending on the grade of the award.

- On the obverse: the effigy of the republic wearing a Phrygian cap crowned with laurels.
  - Inscription: REPUBLIQUE FRANÇAISE (in English : FRENCH REPUBLIC).
- On the reverse: a rectangular cartouche destined to bear the name of the recipient over an unfurled scroll. It sits atop the bottom of a crown of laurels and oak leaves with a ribbon bearing the inscriptions HONNEUR (in English: HONOUR) and TRAVAIL (in English: WORK). The crown surrounds the image of the front of a steam locomotive and a semaphore.
  - Inscription: MINISTERE DES TRAVAUX PUBLICS - CHEMINS DE FER (in English: MINISTRY OF PUBLIC WORKS – RAILROADS).

=== Type 2 award (1939-1953) ===
A 32mm in diameter circular silver or silver gilt medal. The design was from Charles-Maurice Favre-Bertin. The medal hung from a ribbon passing through a suspension ring itself passing through a barrel shaped suspension affixed to the top of the medal. The silk moiré ribbon was 36mm wide with seven equal vertical stripes of blue-white-red-white-blue-white-red.

- On the obverse: the image of a steam locomotive main wheel.
  - Inscription: MEDAILLE - DES - CHEMINOTS and the initials R – F (in English: RAILWAYMEN’S – MEDAL). The RF initials represented RÉPUBLIQUE FRANÇAISE (in English: FRENCH REPUBLIC).
- On the reverse: The image of a hand operating a railway crossing lever over a blank area for the recipient’s name.

=== Type 3 award (1953-1977) ===
A 32mm in diameter bronze, silver gilt or gold circular medal. The design was from Georges Guiraud. The medal hung from a ribbon passing through a suspension ring itself passing through a barrel shaped suspension affixed the top of the medal. The silk moiré ribbon was 36mm wide with seven equal vertical stripes of blue-white-red-white-blue-white-red.

- On the obverse: the effigy of the republic wearing a Phrygian cap in front of rails and framed by two laurel branches.
  - Inscription: REPUBLIQUE FRANÇAISE (in English FRENCH REPUBLIC).
- On the reverse: the image of an electric locomotive and a steam locomotive on a higher rail, framed on the left by an olive branch and surmounting a blank area destined for the recipient’s name.
  - Inscription: MEDAILLE D’HONNEUR DES CHEMINS DE FER (in English: HONOUR MEDAL FOR RAILROADS).

=== Type 4 award (1977 to present) ===
The silver and silver gilt medals are 32mm in diameter, the gold level award is 36mm in diameter. The design was again from Georges Guiraud. The medal hangs from a ribbon passing through a T-shaped suspension loop cast atop of the medal itself. The silk moiré ribbon, 36mm wide for the bronze and silver gilt grades and 38mm wide for the gold grade, has seven equal vertical stripes of blue-white-red-white-blue-white-red. A golden palm adorns the ribbon of the gold level award.

- On the obverse: all three grades of the award although different in size, bear the same design. The effigy of the republic wearing a Phrygian cap in front of rails and framed by two laurel branches.
  - Inscription: REPUBLIQUE FRANÇAISE (in English FRENCH REPUBLIC).
- On the reverse: the image of a French TGV and a steam locomotive on a higher rail, framed on the left by an olive branch and surmounting a blank area destined for the recipient’s name.
  - Inscription: MEDAILLE D’HONNEUR DES CHEMINS DE FER (in English: HONOUR MEDAL FOR RAILROADS).

== Recipients (partial list) ==
- Eugène Verlant 28/07/1930
- Jean Drouillet 1971
- Léon Bronchart
- D Dujeu 1941
- J M Sauvinet 1943
- R Chave 1947
- R. Miot 1983

== See also ==
- National society of French railways
