= Côtes-d'Armor's 3rd constituency =

Constituency of the National Assembly of France

3rd constituency of the Côtes-d'Armor
- inline Constituency of the National Assembly of France

- Constituency in department

- Côtes-d'Armor in France
- Deputy: Corentin Le Fur; LR
- Department: Côtes-d'Armor
- Cantons: La Chèze, Collinée, Corlay, Jugon-les-Lacs, Lamballe, Loudéac, Merdrignac, Moncontour, Mûr-de-Bretagne, Ploeuc-sur-Lié, Plouguenast, Quintin, Uzel

The 3rd constituency of the Côtes-d'Armor is a French legislative constituency in the Côtes-d'Armor département. Like the other 576 French constituencies, it elects one MP using the two-round system, with a run-off if no candidate receives over 50% of the vote in the first round.

== Deputies ==
| Election | Member | Party |
|---|---|---|
| 1958 | Marie-Madeleine Dienesch | MRP |
| 1962 | Marie-Madeleine Dienesch | MRP |
| 1967 | Marie-Madeleine Dienesch | UNR–RPR |
| 1968 | Marie-Madeleine Dienesch | UNR–RPR |
| 1973 | Marie-Madeleine Dienesch | UNR–RPR |
| 1978 | Marie-Madeleine Dienesch | UNR–RPR |
| 1981 | Didier Chouat | PS |
| 1986 | Proportional representation - no election by constituency | |
| 1988 | Didier Chouat | PS |
| 1993 | Marc Le Fur | RPR |
| 1997 | Didier Chouat | PS |
| 2002 | Marc Le Fur | UMP |
| 2007 | Marc Le Fur | UMP |
| 2012 | Marc Le Fur | UMP |
| 2017 | Marc Le Fur | LR |
| 2022 | Marc Le Fur | LR |
| 2024 | Corentin Le Fur | LR |

== Election results ==
=== 2024 ===
| Candidate | Party | Alliance | First round | | | Second round | | |
| Candidate | Party | Alliance | Votes | % | +/– | Votes | % | +/– |
|---|---|---|---|---|---|---|---|---|
| Coretin Le Fur | LR | UDC | 20,520 | 31.96 | -9.73 | 41,619 | 67.97 | +3.10 |
| Odile de Mellon | RN | | 18,345 | 28.57 | +16.82 | 19,616 | 32.03 | new |
| Antoine Ravard | PS | NFP | 14,717 | 22.92 | +0.26 | withdrew | | |
| Lucas Clément | RE | Ensemble | 9,127 | 14.21 | -4.46 | | | |
| Jean-Pierre Lamour | LO | | 451 | 0.70 | -0.31 | | | |
| Bryan Tyli | REG | | 447 | 0.70 | -0.22 | | | |
| Gabrielle Gatien | DIV | | 426 | 0.66 | new | | | |
| Emmanuel Rouxel | REG | | 178 | 0.28 | new | | | |
| Votes | | | 64,211 | 100.00 | | 61,235 | 100.00 | |
| Valid votes | | | 64,211 | 97.90 | +2.16 | 61,235 | 94.26 | -4.09 |
| Blank votes | | | 795 | 1.21 | -1.58 | 2,595 | 3.99 | +2.99 |
| Null votes | | | 581 | 0.89 | -0.58 | 1,131 | 1.74 | +1.09 |
| Turnout | | | 65,587 | 73.35 | +19.04 | 64,961 | 72.65 | +17.26 |
| Abstentions | | | 23,834 | 26.65 | +19.04 | 24,461 | 27.35 | -17.26 |
| Registered voters | | | 89,421 | | | 89,422 | | |
| Result | | | LR HOLD | | | | | |

=== 2022 ===
Legislative Election 2022: Côtes-d'Armor's 3rd constituency
| Party | Candidate | Votes | % | ±% |
|---|---|---|---|---|
| LR (UDC) | Marc Le Fur | 20,203 | 41.69 | +3.17 |
| PS (NUPÉS) | Antoine Ravard | 10,980 | 22.66 | +7.51 |
| LREM (Ensemble) | Olivier Allain | 9,049 | 18.67 | −18.59 |
| RN | Odile De Mellon | 5,693 | 11.75 | +4.99 |
| Others | N/A | 2,540 | 5.24 | |
| Turnout | | 48,465 | 55.39 | −4.95 |
2nd round result
| LR (UDC) | Marc Le Fur | 30,012 | 64.87 | +10.55 |
| PS (NUPÉS) | Antoine Ravard | 16,254 | 35.13 | N/A |
| Turnout | | 46,266 | 54.31 | −3.29 |
| LR hold | | | | |

=== 2017 ===
| Candidate | Label | First round | | Second round | |
| Candidate | Label | Votes | % | Votes | % |
|---|---|---|---|---|---|
| Marc Le Fur | LR | 19,816 | 38.52 | 25,668 | 54.32 |
| Olivier Allain | REM | 19,166 | 37.26 | 21,584 | 45.68 |
| Ronan Glaziou | FI | 4,950 | 9.62 | | |
| Pierre-Marie Launay | FN | 3,479 | 6.76 | | |
| Nicolas Hervé | ECO | 1,853 | 3.60 | | |
| Christelle Schweitzer | PCF | 991 | 1.93 | | |
| Andrée Kerleguer-Viougea | REG | 504 | 0.98 | | |
| Martial Collet | EXG | 400 | 0.78 | | |
| Franck Laposse | DIV | 162 | 0.31 | | |
| Jean-Michel Viel | DIV | 117 | 0.23 | | |
| Votes | | 51,438 | 100.00 | 47,252 | 100.00 |
| Valid votes | | 51,438 | 98.24 | 47,252 | 94.53 |
| Blank votes | | 640 | 1.22 | 1,872 | 3.75 |
| Null votes | | 281 | 0.54 | 862 | 1.72 |
| Turnout | | 52,359 | 60.34 | 49,986 | 57.60 |
| Abstentions | | 34,420 | 39.66 | 36,794 | 42.40 |
| Registered voters | | 86,779 | | 86,780 | |
Source: Ministry of the Interior

=== 2012 ===
2012 legislative election in Cotes-D'Armor's 3rd constituency
| Candidate | Party | First round | | Second round | |
| Candidate | Party | Votes | % | Votes | % |
|---|---|---|---|---|---|
| Marc Le Fur | UMP | 27,183 | 46.64% | 32,436 | 54.28% |
| Loïc Cauret | PS | 22,068 | 37.86% | 27,324 | 45.72% |
| Pierre-Marie Launay | FN | 3,261 | 5.60% | | |
| Christiane Chombeau | FG | 2,302 | 3.95% | | |
| René Louail | EELV | 2,067 | 3.55% | | |
| Isabelle-Anne Rio | MoDem | 580 | 1.00% | | |
| Martial Collet | LO | 291 | 0.50% | | |
| Marie Pecheul | JB (BNAFET) | 274 | 0.47% | | |
| Gwendoline Lions | NPA | 258 | 0.44% | | |
| Valid votes | | 58,284 | 98.88% | 59,760 | 98.34% |
| Spoilt and null votes | | 662 | 1.12% | 1,031 | 1.70% |
| Votes cast / turnout | | 58,946 | 68.25% | 60,771 | 70.37% |
| Abstentions | | 27,419 | 31.75% | 25,592 | 29.63% |
| Registered voters | | 86,365 | 100.00% | 86,363 | 100.00% |

=== 2007 ===
Legislative Election 2007: Côtes-d'Armor's 3rd constituency
| Party | Candidate | Votes | % | ±% |
|---|---|---|---|---|
| UMP | Marc Le Fur | 27,624 | 48.03 | |
| PS | Loïc Cauret | 19,962 | 34.70 | |
| MoDem | Geoffrey De Longuemar | 1,687 | 2.93 | |
| LV | André Ollivro | 1,611 | 2.80 | |
| PCF | Annie Gouardin | 1,430 | 2.49 | |
| FN | Pierre-Marie Launay | 1,275 | 2.22 | |
| Others | N/A | 2,835 | - | |
| Turnout | | 58,562 | 68.41 | |
2nd round result
| UMP | Marc Le Fur | 30,767 | 52.02 | |
| PS | Loïc Cauret | 28,382 | 47.98 | |
| Turnout | | 60,232 | 70.39 | |
| UMP hold | | | | |

=== 2002 ===
Legislative Election 2002: Côtes-d'Armor's 3rd constituency
| Party | Candidate | Votes | % | ±% |
|---|---|---|---|---|
| UMP | Marc Le Fur | 25,521 | 43.64 | |
| PS | Didier Chouat | 20,947 | 35.82 | |
| FN | Pierre-Marie Launay | 2,944 | 5.03 | |
| PR | Guy Le Helloco | 2,346 | 4.01 | |
| LV | Dominique Grall | 2,069 | 3.54 | |
| PCF | Christine Prunaud | 1,826 | 3.12 | |
| Others | N/A | 2,824 | - | |
| Turnout | | 59,674 | 71.62 | |
2nd round result
| UMP | Marc Le Fur | 30,923 | 52.71 | |
| PS | Didier Chouat | 27,739 | 47.29 | |
| Turnout | | 60,315 | 72.45 | |
| UMP gain from PS | | | | |

=== 1997 ===
Legislative Election 1997: Côtes-d'Armor's 3rd constituency
| Party | Candidate | Votes | % | ±% |
|---|---|---|---|---|
| PS | Didier Chouat | 22,972 | 39.37 | |
| RPR | Marc Le Fur | 22,894 | 39.24 | |
| PCF | Gérard Le Cam | 4,329 | 7.42 | |
| FN | Pierre Launay | 3,496 | 5.99 | |
| LV | Jean-Luc Barbo | 1,895 | 3.25 | |
| GE | Philippe Rouxel | 1,690 | 2.90 | |
| LDI | Jean-Pierre Scour | 724 | 1.24 | |
| DIV | Moïse Lesage | 343 | 0.59 | |
| Turnout | | 61,167 | 75.76 | |
2nd round result
| PS | Didier Chouat | 34,036 | 53.38 | |
| RPR | Marc Le Fur | 29,728 | 46.62 | |
| Turnout | | 65,961 | 81.71 | |
| PS gain from RPR | | | | |

== Sources ==
- Official results of French elections from 1998: "Résultats électoraux officiels en France" (in French). Archived from the original on 20 December 2011.
