= Langrolay-sur-Rance =

Langrolay-sur-Rance Langorlae
- Commune
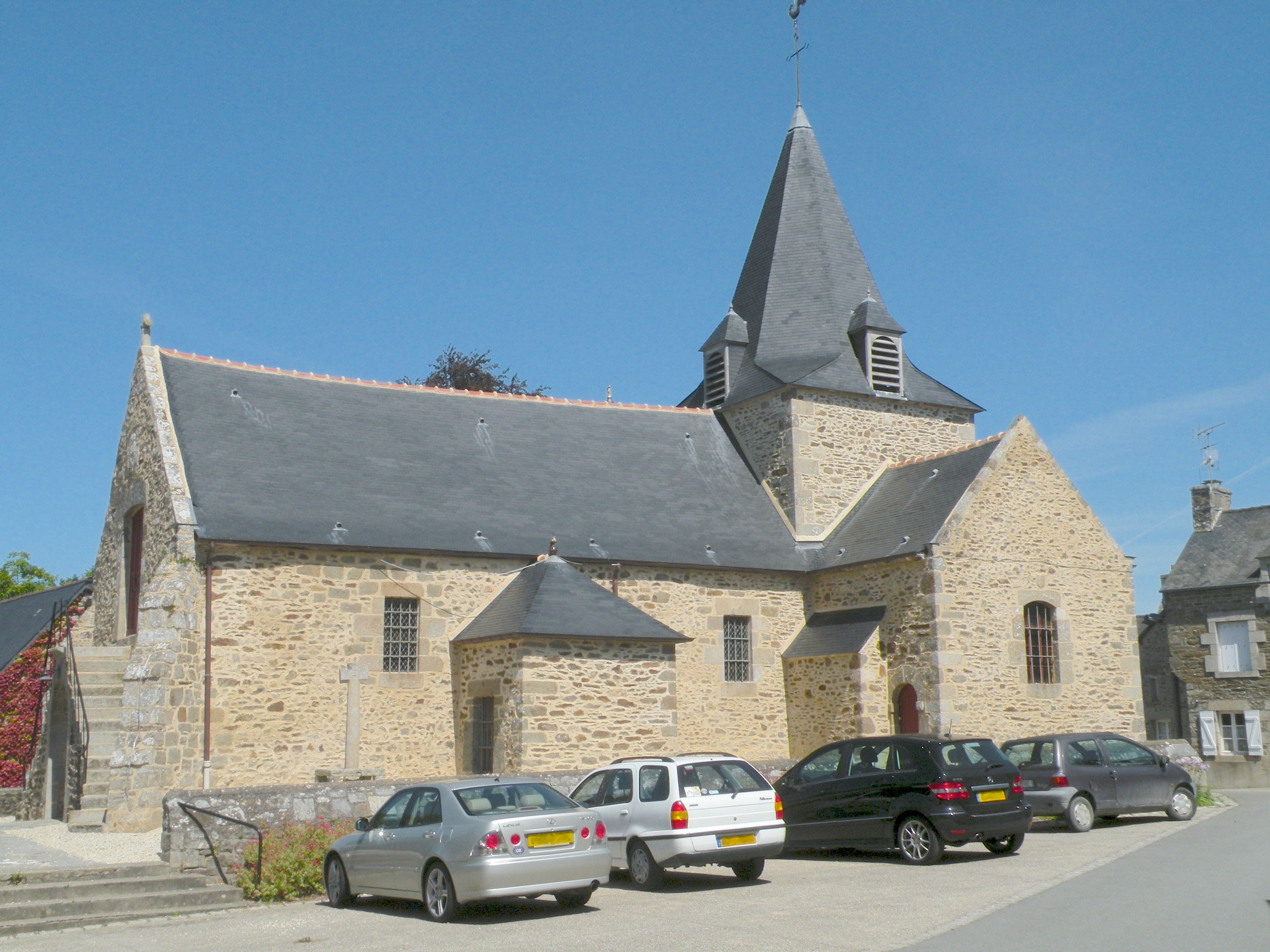
- The church of Saint-Laurent

- Coat of arms
- Location of Langrolay-sur-Rance
- Location within France Location within Brittany
- Coordinates: 48°33′17″N 2°00′05″W
- Country: France
- Region: Brittany
- Department: Côtes-d'Armor
- Arrondissement: Dinan
- Canton: Pleslin-Trigavou
- Intercommunality: Dinan Agglomération

Government
  - Mayor (2020–2026): Jean-Paul Gainche
- Area^{1}: 5.28 km^{2} (2.04 sq mi)
- Highest elevation: 87 m (285 ft)
- Lowest elevation: 4 m (13 ft)
- Population (2023): 991
  - Density: 188/km^{2} (486/sq mi)
- Time zone: UTC+01:00 (CET)
  - Summer (DST): UTC+02:00 (CEST)
- INSEE/Postal code: 22103 /22490
- ^{1} French Land Register data, which excludes lakes, ponds, glaciers > 1 km^{2} (0.386 sq mi or 247 acres) and river estuaries.

Langrolay-sur-Rance (French pronunciation: [lɑ̃ɡʁɔlɛ syʁ ʁɑ̃s], literally Langrolay on Rance; Breton: Langorlae) is a commune in the Côtes-d'Armor department of Brittany in northwestern France.

== Population ==
Historical population
Year	Pop.	±% p.a.
1968	464	—
1975	428	−1.15%
1982	466	+1.22%
1990	584	+2.86%
1999	679	+1.69%
2007	840	+2.70%
2012	841	+0.02%
2017	925	+1.92%
2023	991	+1.16%
Source: INSEE

Inhabitants of Langrolay-sur-Rance are called langrolaisiens in French.

== See also ==
- Communes of the Côtes-d'Armor department
