= Beaussais-sur-Mer =

- Commune
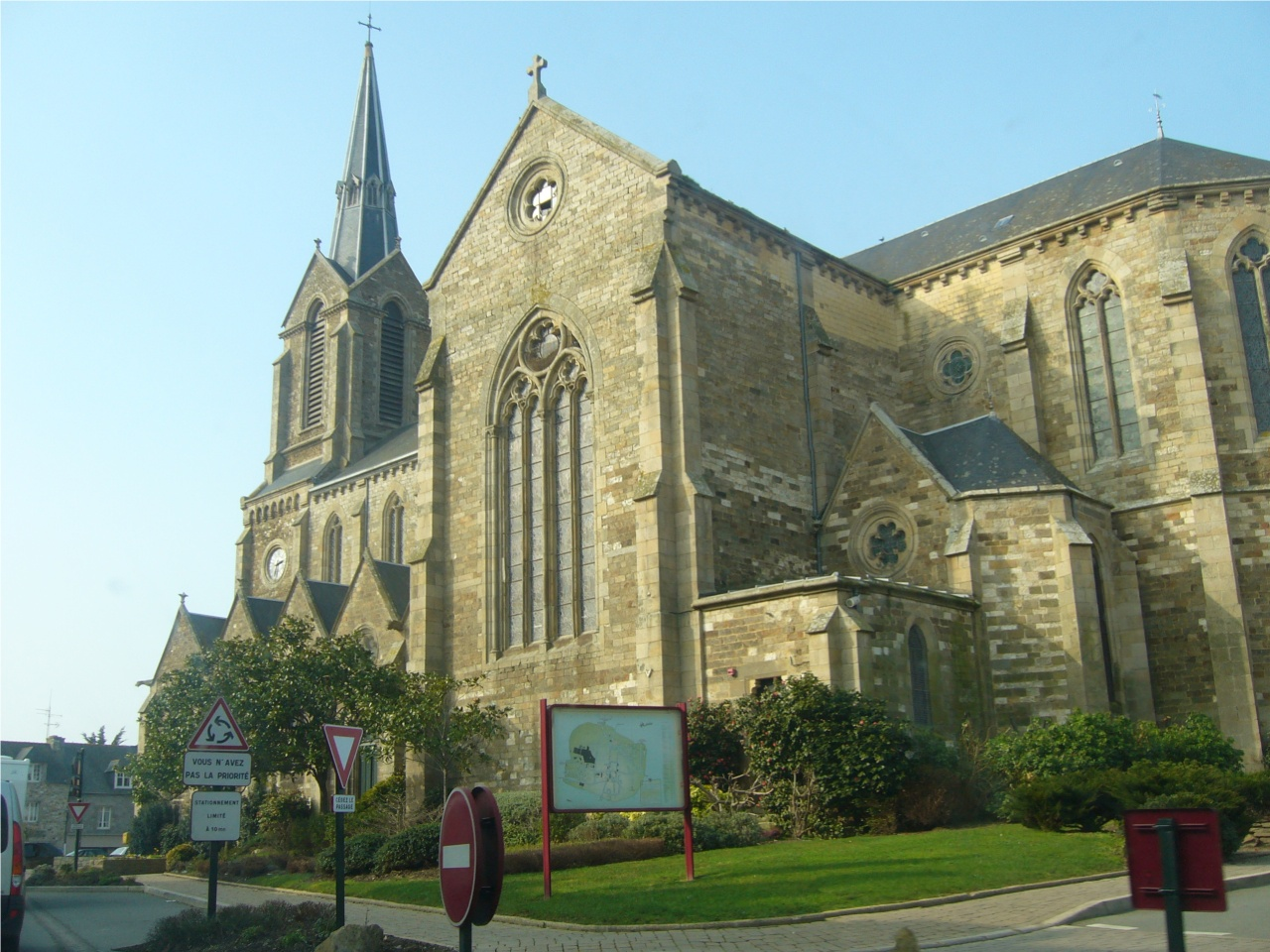
- The church of Saint-Pierre and Saint-Paul, in Ploubalay
- Location of Beaussais-sur-Mer
- Location within France Location within Brittany
- Coordinates: 48°34′52″N 2°08′20″W
- Country: France
- Region: Brittany
- Department: Côtes-d'Armor
- Arrondissement: Dinan
- Canton: Pleslin-Trigavou
- Intercommunality: Dinan Agglomération

Government
  - Mayor (2020–2026): Eugène Caro
- Area^{1}: 41.65 km^{2} (16.08 sq mi)
- Population (2023): 4,498
  - Density: 108.0/km^{2} (279.7/sq mi)
- Time zone: UTC+01:00 (CET)
  - Summer (DST): UTC+02:00 (CEST)
- INSEE/Postal code: 22209 /22650
- ^{1} French Land Register data, which excludes lakes, ponds, glaciers > 1 km^{2} (0.386 sq mi or 247 acres) and river estuaries.

Beaussais-sur-Mer (French pronunciation: [bosɛ syʁ mɛʁ]; Breton: Bosez-Poudour) is a commune in the department of Côtes-d'Armor, western France. The municipality was established on 1 January 2017 by merger of the former communes of Ploubalay (the seat), Plessix-Balisson and Trégon.

== Population ==
Population data refer to the commune in its geography as of January 2025.

Historical population
Year	Pop.	±% p.a.
1968	2,548	—
1975	2,606	+0.32%
1982	2,649	+0.23%
1990	2,687	+0.18%
1999	2,728	+0.17%
2007	2,876	+0.66%
2012	3,208	+2.21%
2017	3,556	+2.08%
2023	4,498	+3.99%
Source: INSEE

== See also ==
- Communes of the Côtes-d'Armor department
