= Departmental Council of Côtes-d'Armor =

Departmental legislature in France

Departmental Council of Côtes-d'Armor Conseil départemental des Côtes-d'Armor

Leadership
- President: Christian Coail, PS since 1 July 2021

Structure
- Seats: 54
- Political groups: Government (38): DVG (18); PS (13); LÉ (3); G.s (2); PCF (2); Opposition (16): DVD (8); LR (5); UDI (3); cotesdarmor.fr

The Departmental Council of Côtes-d'Armor (French: Conseil départemental des Côtes-d'Armor, Breton: Kuzul-departamant Aodoù-an-Arvor) is the deliberative assembly of the Côtes-d'Armor department in the region of Brittany, France. It consists of 54 members (general councilors) from 27 cantons and its headquarters are in Saint-Brieuc.

The President of the council is Christian Coail.

== Vice-Presidents ==
The President of the Departmental Council is assisted by 12 vice-presidents chosen from among the departmental advisers. Each of them has a delegation of authority.

List of vice-presidents of the Hérault Departmental Council (as of 2021)
Order	Name	Party	Canton (constituency)	Delegation
1st	Jean-Marie Benier	UGE	Plérin	Human resources and social dialogue
2nd	Véronique Cadudal	DVG	Paimpol	Autonomy
3rd	Vincent Alleno	DVG	Plaintel	Finance, digital and territorial contracts
4th	Cinderella Bernard	UG	Bégard	Children and families
5th	Patrice Kervaon	UGE	Lannion	Culture of Brittany
6th	Solenn Meslay	DVG	Pleslin-Trigavou	Community life and international relations
7th	Jean-René Carfantan	DVG	Pléneuf-Val-André	Education
8th	Christine Orain-Grovalet	UG	Ploufragan	Integration, social action, social and solidarity economy and gender equality
9th	Ludovic Gouyette	UG	Saint-Brieuc-2	Youth and sports
10th	Gaëlle Routier	DVG	Plélo	Housing and habitat
11th	André Coënt	DVG	Plestin-les-Grèves	Infrastructures and mobilities
12th	Nathalie Travert-Le Roux	DVG	Lamballe-Armor	Real estate and tourism
