= Corentin Le Fur =

French politician (born 1989)

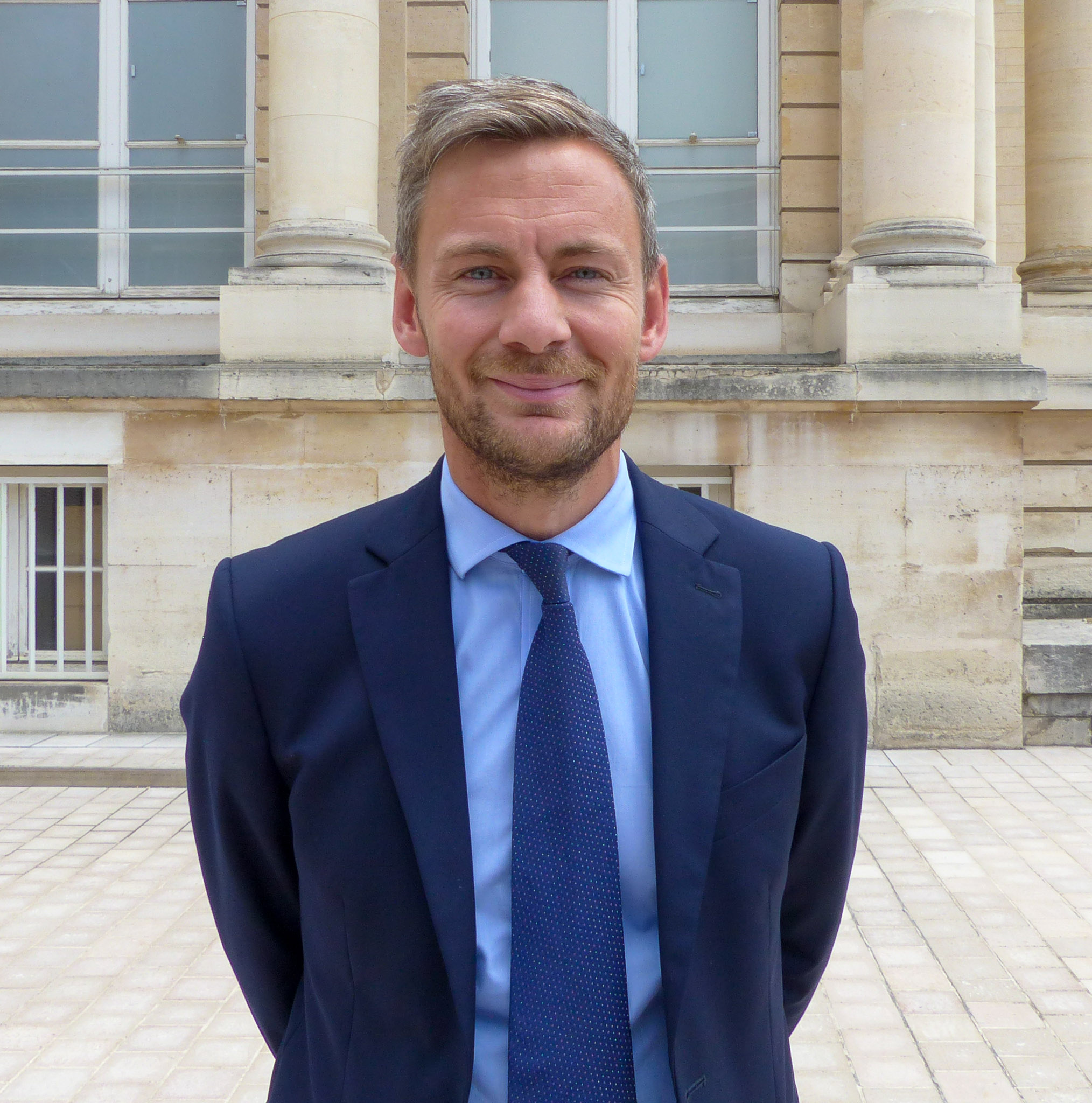

Member of the French National Assembly for Côtes-d'Armor's 3rd constituency
- Incumbent
- Assumed office 18 July 2024
- Preceded by: Marc Le Fur

Personal details
- Born: 13 December 1989 (age 35)
- Political party: The Republicans
- Parent: Marc Le Fur (father)

Corentin Le Fur (born 13 December 1989) is a French politician of The Republicans. He was elected member of the National Assembly for Côtes-d'Armor's 3rd constituency in 2024. Where he succeeded his father Marc Le Fur.
