= French protectorate =

French protectorate may refer to:

- The French protectorate of Cambodia
- The French protectorate of Laos
- The French protectorate in Morocco
- The French protectorate of Tunisia
- The Annam (French protectorate)
- The Tonkin (French protectorate)
- The Malagasy Protectorate
- The Saar Protectorate
