= Pleslin-Trigavou =

Pleslin-Trigavou Plelin-Tregavoù
- Commune
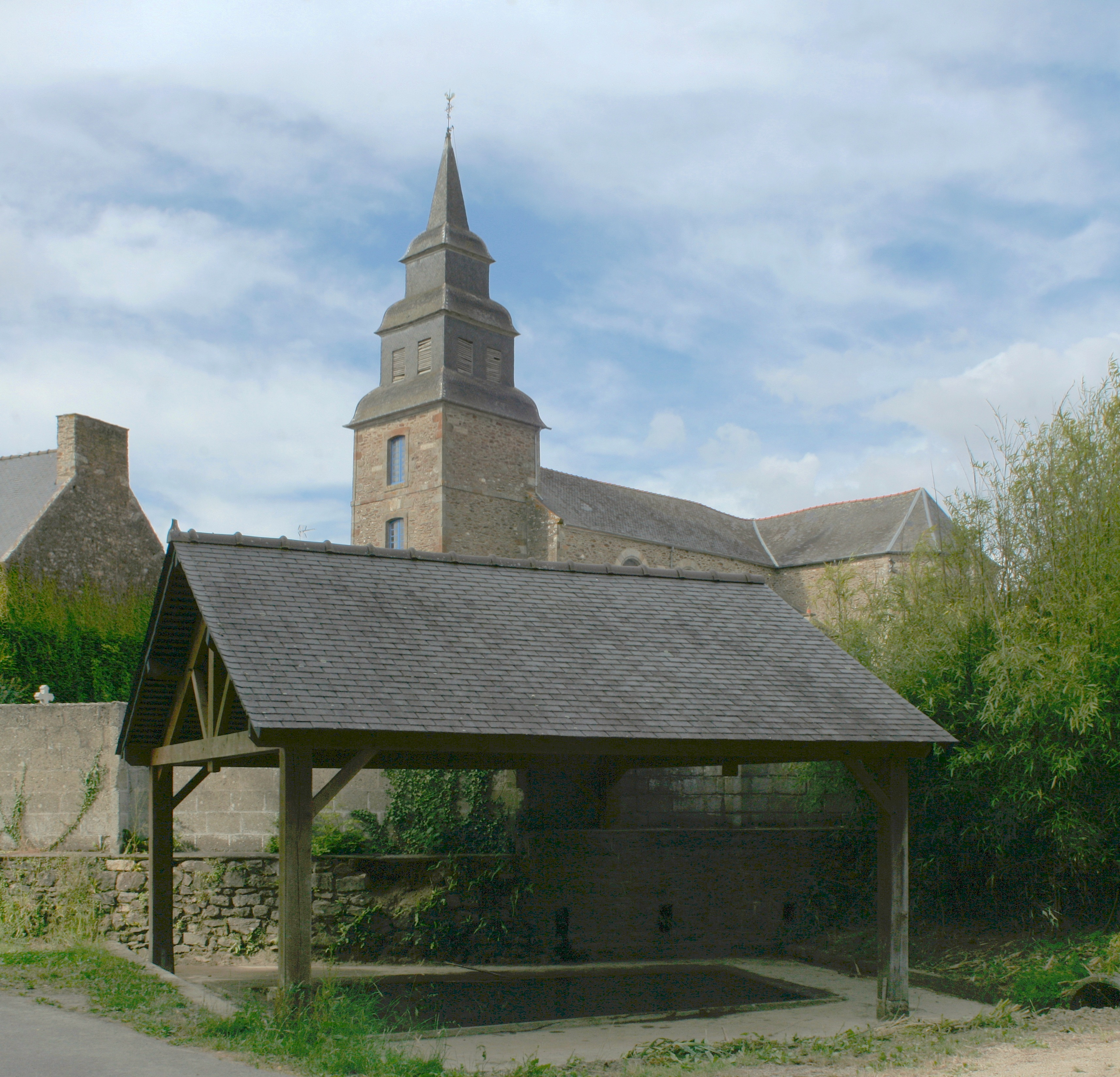
- St. Peter church and wash house
- Location of Pleslin-Trigavou
- Location within France Location within Brittany
- Coordinates: 48°32′09″N 2°03′13″W
- Country: France
- Region: Brittany
- Department: Côtes-d'Armor
- Arrondissement: Dinan
- Canton: Pleslin-Trigavou
- Intercommunality: Dinan Agglomération

Government
  - Mayor (2020–2026): Thierry Orveillon
- Area^{1}: 21.80 km^{2} (8.42 sq mi)
- Highest elevation: 95 m (312 ft)
- Lowest elevation: 32 m (105 ft)
- Population (2023): 4,065
  - Density: 186.5/km^{2} (482.9/sq mi)
- Time zone: UTC+01:00 (CET)
  - Summer (DST): UTC+02:00 (CEST)
- INSEE/Postal code: 22190 /22490
- ^{1} French Land Register data, which excludes lakes, ponds, glaciers > 1 km^{2} (0.386 sq mi or 247 acres) and river estuaries.

Pleslin-Trigavou (French pronunciation: [plɛlɛ̃ tʁiɡavu]; Breton: Plelin-Tregavoù) is a commune in the Côtes-d'Armor department of Brittany in northwestern France. It was created in 1973 by the merger of two former communes: Pleslin and Trigavou.

== Population ==
Inhabitants of Pleslin-Trigavou are called pleslinois-trigavouais or pleslinais-trigavouais in French.

Historical population
Year	Pop.	±% p.a.
1968	2,111	—
1975	2,267	+1.02%
1982	2,565	+1.78%
1990	2,830	+1.24%
1999	2,951	+0.47%
2007	3,426	+1.88%
2012	3,418	−0.05%
2017	3,627	+1.19%
2023	4,065	+1.92%
Source: INSEE

== See also ==
- Communes of the Côtes-d'Armor department
