= Didier Chouat =

French politician (1945–2014)

Member of the National Assembly for Côtes-d'Armor's 3rd constituency
- In office 1 June 1997 – 18 June 2002
- In office 2 July 1981 – 1 April 1993

Personal details
- Born: 24 April 1945 Paris, France
- Died: 20 November 2014 (aged 69) Saint-Brieuc, France
- Party: Socialist Party
- Relations: Francis Chouat (brother)
- Profession: Teacher

Didier Chouat (24 April 1945 – 20 November 2014) was a French politician who served as a member of the National Assembly.

== Biography ==
A history and geography teacher by profession, he was elected in 1981 as representative of the Côtes-d'Armor's 3rd constituency for the seventh legislature and was re-elected in 1986 and 1988. In 1993, he was defeated by the Rassemblement pour la République candidate, Marc Le Fur, who won 51.33% of the vote in the second round.

He returned to office in 1997, during the 11th legislative term. During this term, he was a member of the Committee on Cultural, Family, and Social Affairs, then the Committee on Finance, General Economy, and Planning.

He was defeated again by Marc Le Fur in 2002, obtaining only 47.29% of the votes in the second round. He chose not to run for re-election in the 2007 French legislative election.

He was mayor of Loudéac from 1989 to 2001 and general councilor for the canton of Loudéac from 1985 to 1992.

He died on November 20, 2014. His brother Francis Chouat became a member of parliament in November 2018.

== Political career ==
Chouat served 3 separate terms as MP for Côtes-d'Armor's 3rd constituency.

== Personal life ==
His brother Francis Chouat is also an MP.
