= Canton of Pleslin-Trigavou =

Coordinates: 48.53°N 2.06°W

The canton of Pleslin-Trigavou is an administrative division of the Côtes-d'Armor department, northwestern France. It was created at the French canton reorganisation which came into effect in March 2015. Its seat is in Pleslin-Trigavou.

It consists of the following communes:

1. Beaussais-sur-Mer
2. Lancieux
3. Langrolay-sur-Rance
4. Pleslin-Trigavou
5. Plouër-sur-Rance
6. Saint-Samson-sur-Rance
7. Taden
8. Tréméreuc
9. La Vicomté-sur-Rance
