= La Chapelle-Neuve =

La Chapelle-Neuve is the name of several communes in France:

- La Chapelle-Neuve, in the Côtes-d'Armor department
- La Chapelle-Neuve, in the Morbihan department

== See also ==
- Chapelle (disambiguation)
