= Arrondissement of Guingamp =

Coordinates: 48°33′40″N 3°09′00″W

Guingamp
- Arrondissement
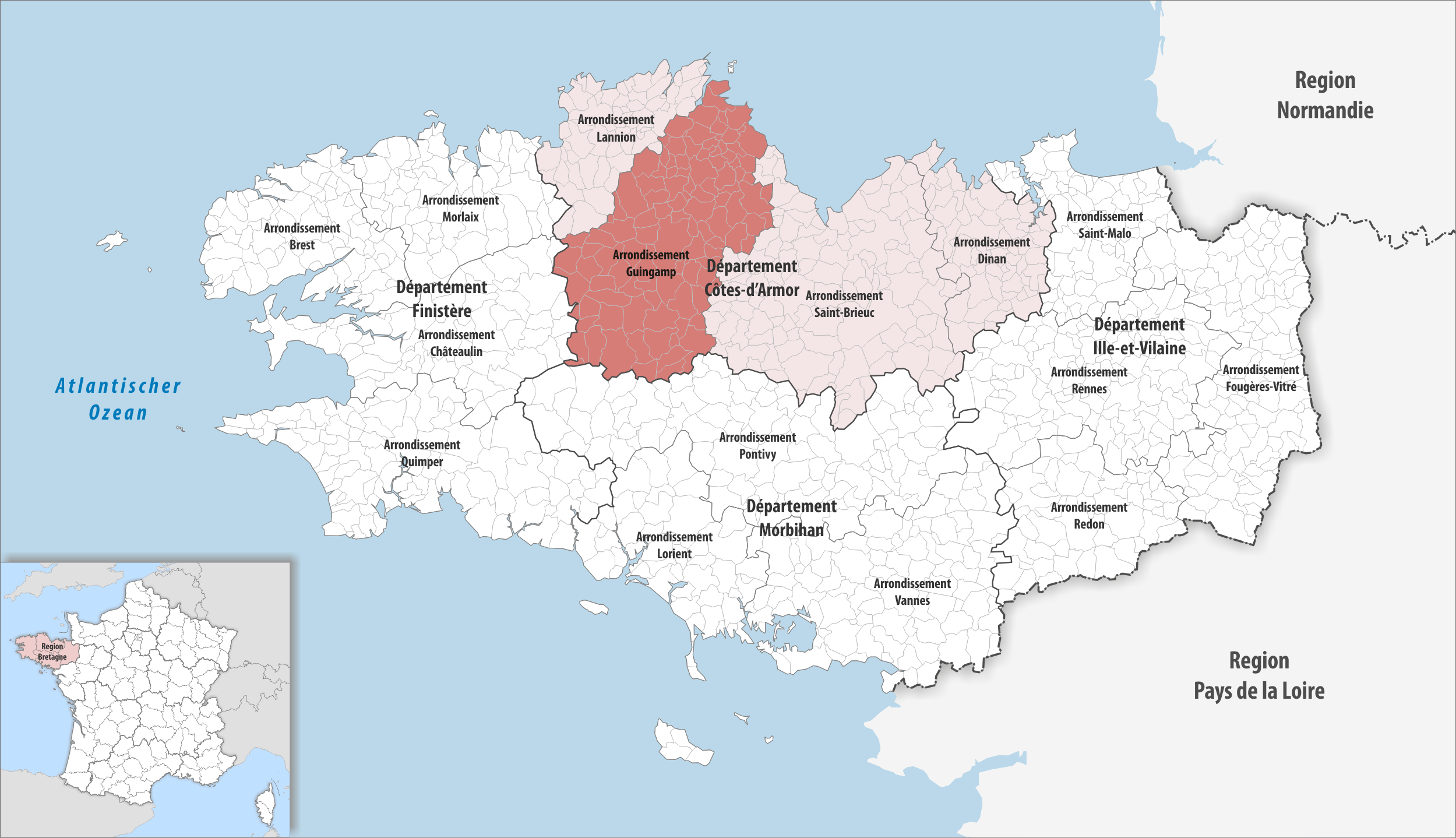
- Location within the region Brittany
- Country: France
- Region: Brittany
- Department: Côtes-d'Armor
- No. of communes: {{{nbcomm}}}
- Area: 2,292.3 km^{2} (885.1 sq mi)
- Population (2023): 126,751
  - Density: 55.294/km^{2} (143.21/sq mi)
- INSEE code: 222

The arrondissement of Guingamp is an arrondissement of France in the Côtes-d'Armor department in the Brittany region. It has 111 communes. Its population is 125,699 (2021), and its area is 2,292.3 km^{2} (885.1 sq mi).

== Composition ==
The communes of the arrondissement of Guingamp, and their INSEE codes, are:

1. Bégard (22004)
2. Belle-Isle-en-Terre (22005)
3. Bon Repos sur Blavet (22107)
4. Boqueho (22011)
5. Bourbriac (22013)
6. Brélidy (22018)
7. Bringolo (22019)
8. Bulat-Pestivien (22023)
9. Calanhel (22024)
10. Callac (22025)
11. Canihuel (22029)
12. Carnoët (22031)
13. La Chapelle-Neuve (22037)
14. Châtelaudren-Plouagat (22206)
15. Coadout (22040)
16. Cohiniac (22045)
17. Duault (22052)
18. Le Faouët (22057)
19. Glomel (22061)
20. Gommenec'h (22063)
21. Gouarec (22064)
22. Goudelin (22065)
23. Grâces (22067)
24. Guingamp (22070)
25. Gurunhuel (22072)
26. Kerfot (22086)
27. Kergrist-Moëlou (22087)
28. Kerien (22088)
29. Kermoroc'h (22091)
30. Kerpert (22092)
31. Landebaëron (22095)
32. Lanleff (22108)
33. Lanloup (22109)
34. Lannebert (22112)
35. Lanrivain (22115)
36. Lanrodec (22116)
37. Lanvollon (22121)
38. Lescouët-Gouarec (22124)
39. Locarn (22128)
40. Loc-Envel (22129)
41. Lohuec (22132)
42. Louargat (22135)
43. Maël-Carhaix (22137)
44. Maël-Pestivien (22138)
45. Magoar (22139)
46. Mellionnec (22146)
47. Le Merzer (22150)
48. Moustéru (22156)
49. Le Moustoir (22157)
50. Pabu (22161)
51. Paimpol (22162)
52. Paule (22163)
53. Pédernec (22164)
54. Peumerit-Quintin (22169)
55. Pléguien (22177)
56. Pléhédel (22178)
57. Plélauff (22181)
58. Plélo (22182)
59. Plerneuf (22188)
60. Plésidy (22189)
61. Plévin (22202)
62. Ploëzal (22204)
63. Ploubazlanec (22210)
64. Plouëc-du-Trieux (22212)
65. Plouézec (22214)
66. Plougonver (22216)
67. Plouguernével (22220)
68. Plouha (22222)
69. Plouisy (22223)
70. Ploumagoar (22225)
71. Plounévez-Quintin (22229)
72. Plourac'h (22231)
73. Plourivo (22233)
74. Plouvara (22234)
75. Pludual (22236)
76. Plusquellec (22243)
77. Pommerit-le-Vicomte (22248)
78. Pont-Melvez (22249)
79. Pontrieux (22250)
80. Quemper-Guézennec (22256)
81. Rostrenen (22266)
82. Runan (22269)
83. Saint-Adrien (22271)
84. Saint-Agathon (22272)
85. Saint-Clet (22283)
86. Saint-Connan (22284)
87. Sainte-Tréphine (22331)
88. Saint-Fiacre (22289)
89. Saint-Gilles-les-Bois (22293)
90. Saint-Gilles-Pligeaux (22294)
91. Saint-Igeaux (22334)
92. Saint-Jean-Kerdaniel (22304)
93. Saint-Laurent (22310)
94. Saint-Nicodème (22320)
95. Saint-Nicolas-du-Pélem (22321)
96. Saint-Péver (22322)
97. Saint-Servais (22328)
98. Senven-Léhart (22335)
99. Squiffiec (22338)
100. Trébrivan (22344)
101. Treffrin (22351)
102. Tréglamus (22354)
103. Trégomeur (22356)
104. Trégonneau (22358)
105. Tréguidel (22361)
106. Trémargat (22365)
107. Tréméven (22370)
108. Tréogan (22373)
109. Tressignaux (22375)
110. Trévérec (22378)
111. Yvias (22390)

== History ==
The arrondissement of Guingamp was created in 1800. At the January 2017 reorganisation of the arrondissements of Côtes-d'Armor, it gained 29 communes from the arrondissement of Saint-Brieuc, and it lost five communes to the arrondissement of Saint-Brieuc.

As a result of the reorganisation of the cantons of France which came into effect in 2015, the borders of the cantons are no longer related to the borders of the arrondissements. The cantons of the arrondissement of Guingamp were, as of January 2015:

1. Bégard
2. Belle-Isle-en-Terre
3. Bourbriac
4. Callac
5. Gouarec
6. Guingamp
7. Maël-Carhaix
8. Mûr-de-Bretagne
9. Plouagat
10. Pontrieux
11. Rostrenen
12. Saint-Nicolas-du-Pélem
