= Saint-Adrien =

Saint-Adrien may refer to:

- Saint-Adrien, Côtes-d'Armor, France
- Saint-Adrien, Quebec, Canada

== See also ==
- Saint-Adrien-d'Irlande, Quebec, Canada
- Bosc-Guérard-Saint-Adrien, France
- Le Mont-Saint-Adrien, France
- Adrien, name
