= Guingamp-Paimpol Agglomération =

- Communauté d'agglomération
- Interactive map of Guingamp-Paimpol Agglomération
- Coordinates: 48°32′N 03°15′W
- Country: France
- Region: Brittany
- Department: Côtes-d'Armor
- No. of communes: {{{nbcomm}}}
- Established: 2017
- Area: 1,107.7 km^{2} (427.7 sq mi)
- Population (2019): 73,427
  - Density: 66.288/km^{2} (171.68/sq mi)
- Website: www.guingamp-paimpol-agglo.bzh

Guingamp-Paimpol Agglomération (full name: Guingamp-Paimpol Agglomération de l'Armor à l'Argoat; Breton: Bodad Gwengamp-Paimpol) is the communauté d'agglomération, an intercommunal structure, centred on the towns of Guingamp and Paimpol. It is located in the Côtes-d'Armor department, in the Brittany region, northwestern France. Created in 2017, its seat is in Guingamp. Its area is 1,107.7 km^{2}. Its population was 73,427 in 2019.

== Composition ==
The communauté d'agglomération consists of the following 57 communes:

1. Bégard
2. Belle-Isle-en-Terre
3. Bourbriac
4. Brélidy
5. Bulat-Pestivien
6. Calanhel
7. Callac
8. Carnoët
9. La Chapelle-Neuve
10. Coadout
11. Duault
12. Grâces
13. Guingamp
14. Gurunhuel
15. Kerfot
16. Kerien
17. Kermoroc'h
18. Kerpert
19. Landebaëron
20. Lanleff
21. Lanloup
22. Loc-Envel
23. Lohuec
24. Louargat
25. Maël-Pestivien
26. Magoar
27. Moustéru
28. Pabu
29. Paimpol
30. Pédernec
31. Pléhédel
32. Plésidy
33. Ploëzal
34. Ploubazlanec
35. Plouëc-du-Trieux
36. Plouézec
37. Plougonver
38. Plouisy
39. Ploumagoar
40. Plourac'h
41. Plourivo
42. Plusquellec
43. Pont-Melvez
44. Pontrieux
45. Quemper-Guézennec
46. Runan
47. Saint-Adrien
48. Saint-Agathon
49. Saint-Clet
50. Saint-Laurent
51. Saint-Nicodème
52. Saint-Servais
53. Senven-Léhart
54. Squiffiec
55. Tréglamus
56. Trégonneau
57. Yvias
