= Saint-Clet, Côtes-d'Armor =

Saint-Clet Sant-Kleve
- Commune
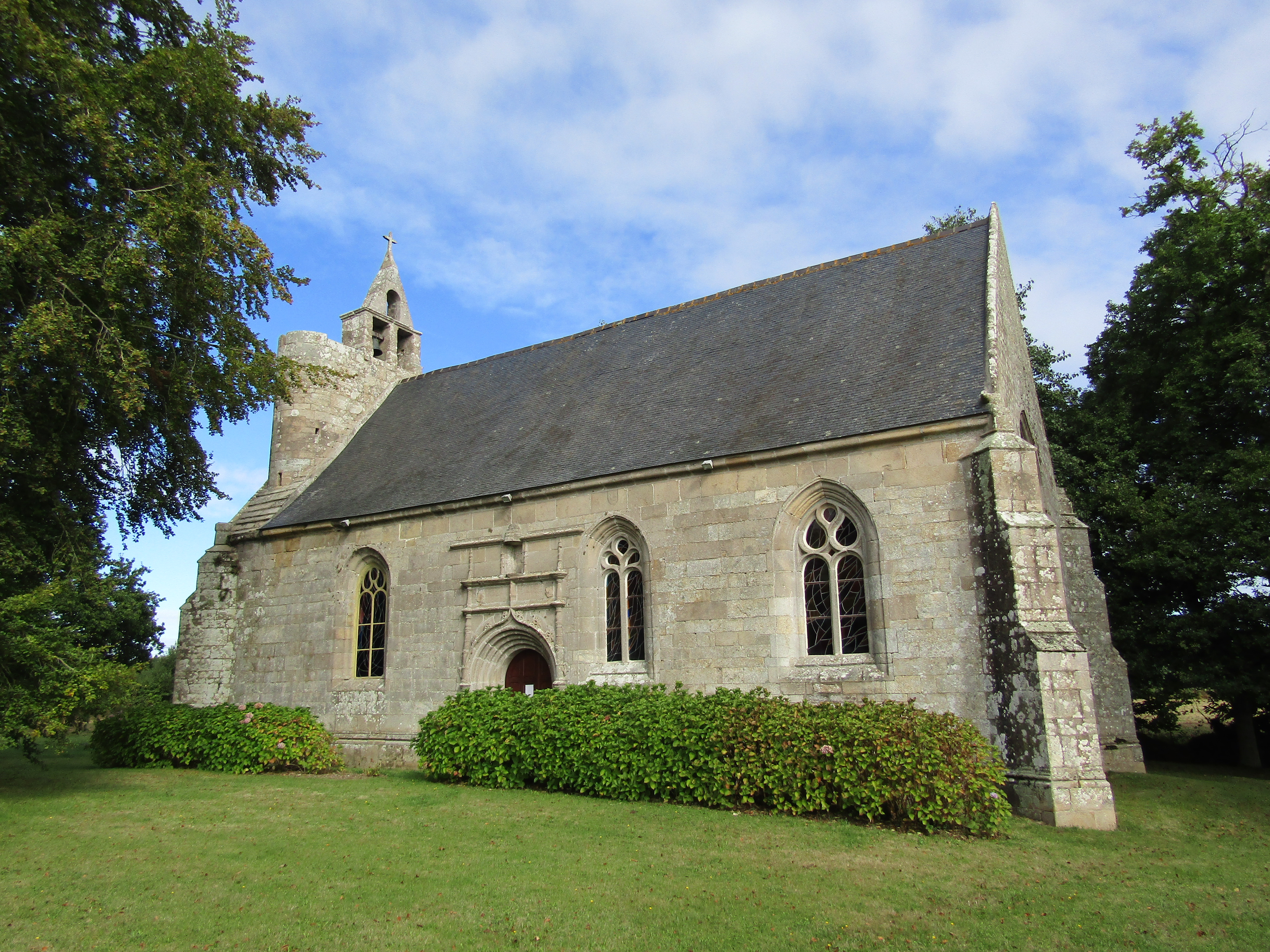
- The chapel of Our Lady of Clérin
- Location of Saint-Clet
- Location within France Location within Brittany
- Coordinates: 48°39′47″N 3°07′52″W
- Country: France
- Region: Brittany
- Department: Côtes-d'Armor
- Arrondissement: Guingamp
- Canton: Bégard
- Intercommunality: Guingamp-Paimpol Agglomération

Government
  - Mayor (2020–2026): Claude Piriou
- Area^{1}: 14.46 km^{2} (5.58 sq mi)
- Highest elevation: 99 m (325 ft)
- Lowest elevation: 7 m (23 ft)
- Population (2023): 877
  - Density: 60.7/km^{2} (157/sq mi)
- Time zone: UTC+01:00 (CET)
  - Summer (DST): UTC+02:00 (CEST)
- INSEE/Postal code: 22283 /22260
- ^{1} French Land Register data, which excludes lakes, ponds, glaciers > 1 km^{2} (0.386 sq mi or 247 acres) and river estuaries.

Saint-Clet (French pronunciation: [sɛ̃ klɛt]; Breton: Sant-Kleve) is a commune in the Côtes-d'Armor department of Brittany in northwestern France.

== Population ==
Historical population
Year	Pop.	±% p.a.
1968	885	—
1975	861	−0.39%
1982	847	−0.23%
1990	744	−1.61%
1999	785	+0.60%
2007	837	+0.80%
2012	878	+0.96%
2017	875	−0.07%
2023	877	+0.04%
Source: INSEE

Inhabitants of Saint-Clet are called saint-clétois in French.

== See also ==
- Communes of the Côtes-d'Armor department
