= Duault =

Duault Duaod
- Commune
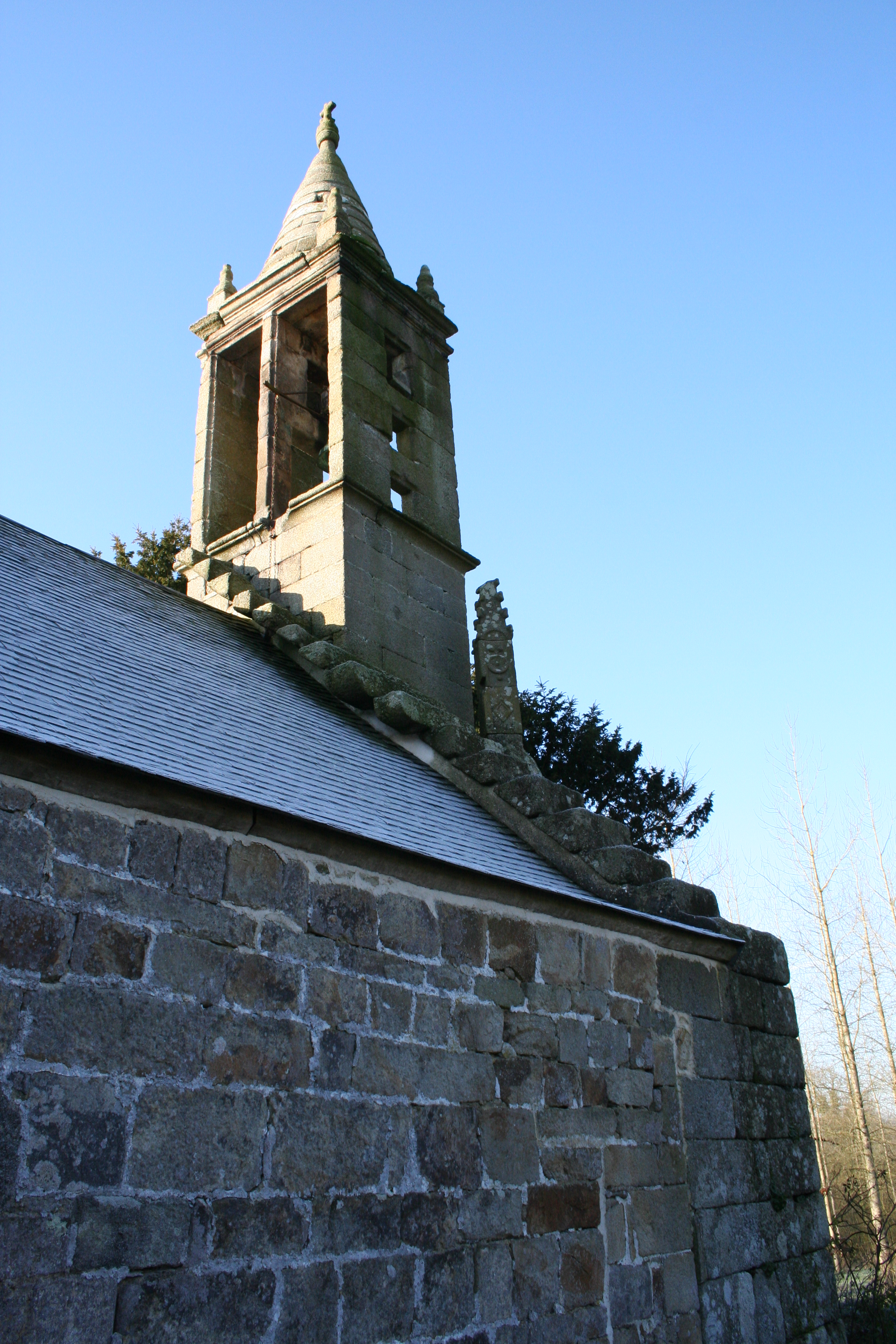
- The priory of Landugen, in Duault

- Coat of arms
- Location of Duault
- Location within France Location within Brittany
- Coordinates: 48°21′43″N 3°26′03″W
- Country: France
- Region: Brittany
- Department: Côtes-d'Armor
- Arrondissement: Guingamp
- Canton: Callac
- Intercommunality: Guingamp-Paimpol Agglomération

Government
  - Mayor (2020–2026): Claude Callonnec
- Area^{1}: 21.59 km^{2} (8.34 sq mi)
- Highest elevation: 256 m (840 ft)
- Lowest elevation: 97 m (318 ft)
- Population (2023): 385
  - Density: 17.8/km^{2} (46.2/sq mi)
- Time zone: UTC+01:00 (CET)
  - Summer (DST): UTC+02:00 (CEST)
- INSEE/Postal code: 22052 /22160
- ^{1} French Land Register data, which excludes lakes, ponds, glaciers > 1 km^{2} (0.386 sq mi or 247 acres) and river estuaries.

Duault (French pronunciation: [dɥot]; Breton: Duaod) is a commune in the Côtes-d'Armor department of Brittany in northwestern France.

== Population ==
Historical population
Year	Pop.	±% p.a.
1968	638	—
1975	529	−2.64%
1982	442	−2.53%
1990	404	−1.12%
1999	356	−1.40%
2007	341	−0.54%
2012	364	+1.31%
2017	362	−0.11%
2023	385	+1.03%
Source: INSEE

The inhabitants of Duault are known in French as duaultois.

== See also ==
- Communes of the Côtes-d'Armor department
