= Tréglamus =

Tréglamus Treglañviz
- Commune
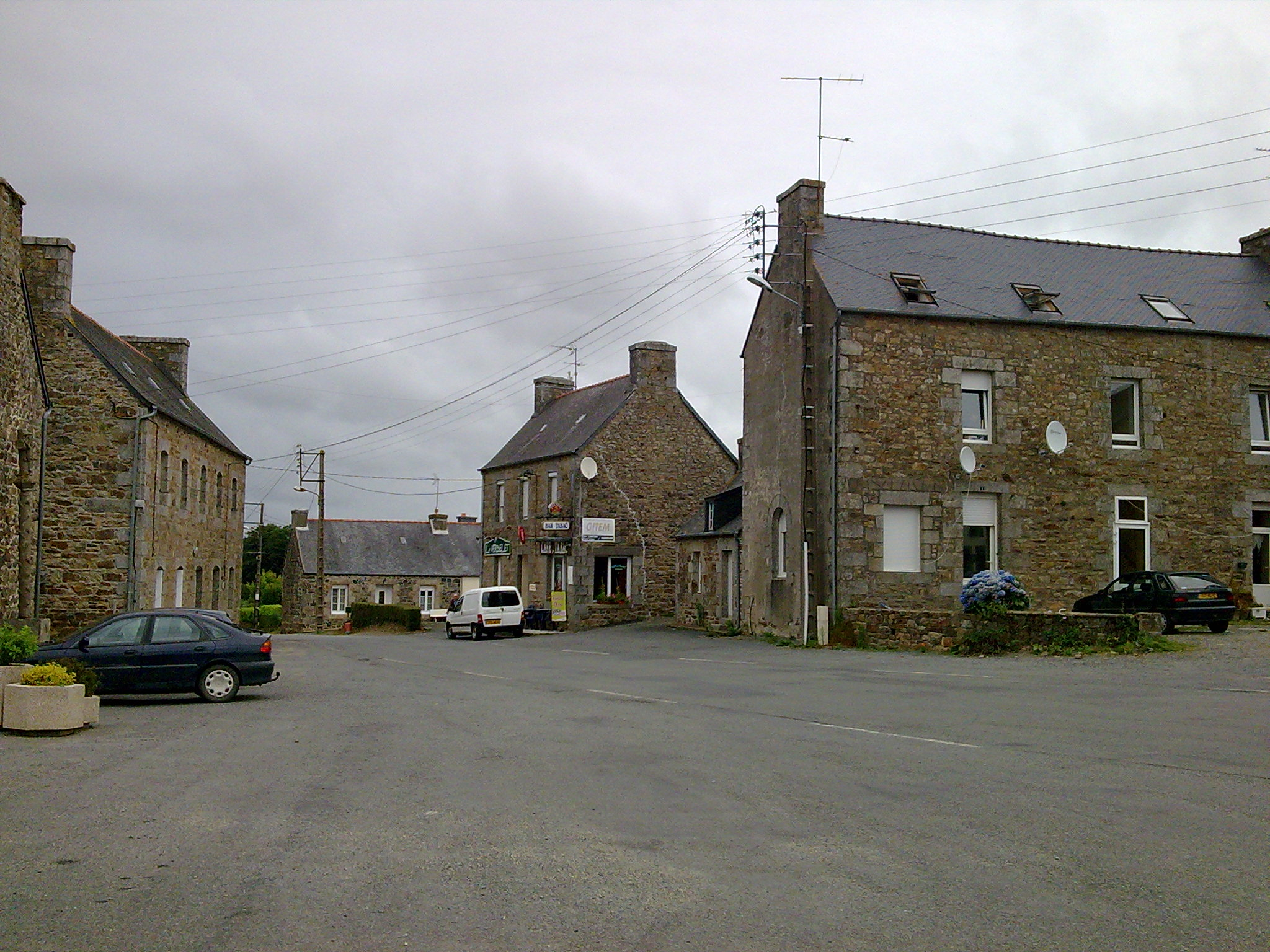
- A view within Tréglamus
- Location of Tréglamus
- Location within France Location within Brittany
- Coordinates: 48°33′28″N 3°16′24″W
- Country: France
- Region: Brittany
- Department: Côtes-d'Armor
- Arrondissement: Guingamp
- Canton: Callac
- Intercommunality: Guingamp-Paimpol Agglomération

Government
  - Mayor (2020–2026): Dominique Pariscoat
- Area^{1}: 18.79 km^{2} (7.25 sq mi)
- Highest elevation: 295 m (968 ft)
- Lowest elevation: 128 m (420 ft)
- Population (2023): 1,096
  - Density: 58.33/km^{2} (151.1/sq mi)
- Time zone: UTC+01:00 (CET)
  - Summer (DST): UTC+02:00 (CEST)
- INSEE/Postal code: 22354 /22540
- ^{1} French Land Register data, which excludes lakes, ponds, glaciers > 1 km^{2} (0.386 sq mi or 247 acres) and river estuaries.

Tréglamus (French pronunciation: [tʁeɡlamys]; Breton: Treglañviz) is a commune in the Côtes-d'Armor department of Brittany in northwestern France.

== Population ==
Historical population
Year	Pop.	±% p.a.
1968	757	—
1975	715	−0.81%
1982	763	+0.93%
1990	795	+0.51%
1999	836	+0.56%
2007	961	+1.76%
2012	990	+0.60%
2017	1,034	+0.87%
2023	1,096	+0.98%
Source: INSEE

Inhabitants of Tréglamus are called Cocagnards and Cocagnardes in French.

== See also ==
- Communes of the Côtes-d'Armor department
