= Carnoët =

Carnoët Karnoed
- Commune
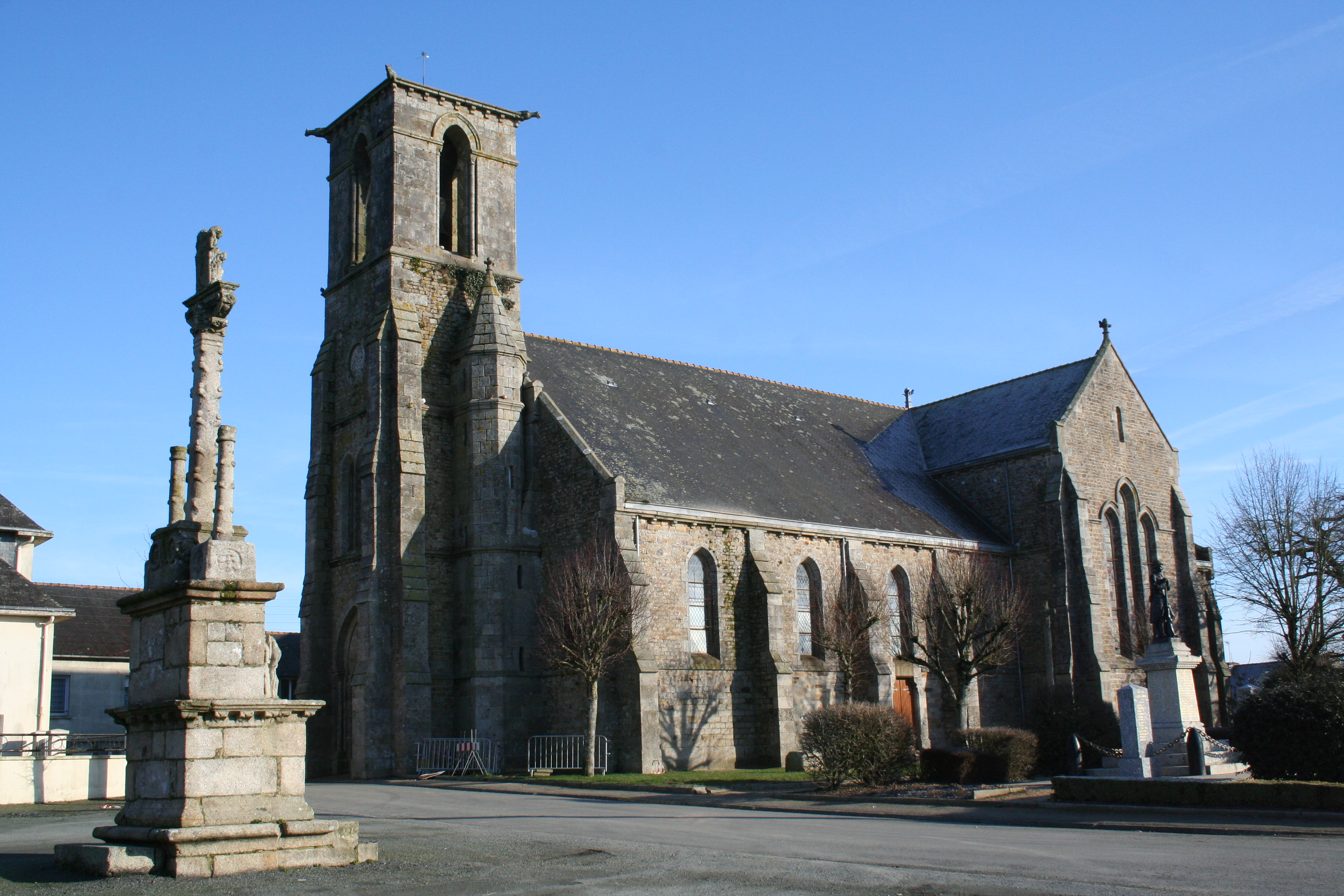
- The church of Carnoët

- Coat of arms
- Location of Carnoët
- Location within France Location within Brittany
- Coordinates: 48°22′07″N 3°31′13″W
- Country: France
- Region: Brittany
- Department: Côtes-d'Armor
- Arrondissement: Guingamp
- Canton: Callac
- Intercommunality: Guingamp-Paimpol Agglomération

Government
  - Mayor (2020–2026): Pascal Leyour
- Area^{1}: 42.06 km^{2} (16.24 sq mi)
- Highest elevation: 235 m (771 ft)
- Lowest elevation: 87 m (285 ft)
- Population (2023): 673
  - Density: 16.0/km^{2} (41.4/sq mi)
- Time zone: UTC+01:00 (CET)
  - Summer (DST): UTC+02:00 (CEST)
- INSEE/Postal code: 22031 /22160
- ^{1} French Land Register data, which excludes lakes, ponds, glaciers > 1 km^{2} (0.386 sq mi or 247 acres) and river estuaries.

Carnoët (French pronunciation: [kaʁnwɛt]; Breton: Karnoed) is a commune in the Côtes-d'Armor department of Brittany in northwestern France.

== Population ==
Historical population
Year	Pop.	±% p.a.
1968	1,350	—
1975	1,061	−3.38%
1982	840	−3.28%
1990	727	−1.79%
1999	729	+0.03%
2007	754	+0.42%
2012	723	−0.84%
2017	661	−1.78%
2023	673	+0.30%
Source: INSEE

== See also ==
- Communes of the Côtes-d'Armor department
