= Pédernec =

Pédernec Pederneg
- Commune
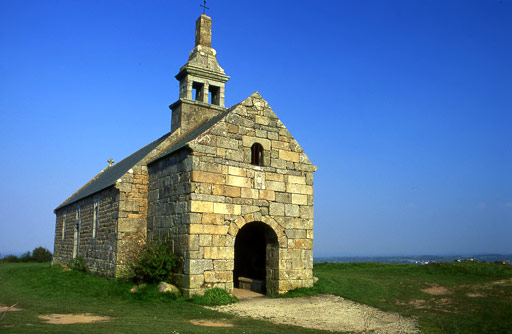
- Chapel of St. Hervé on the summit of the Menez Bré
- Location of Pédernec
- Location within France Location within Brittany
- Coordinates: 48°35′52″N 3°16′07″W
- Country: France
- Region: Brittany
- Department: Côtes-d'Armor
- Arrondissement: Guingamp
- Canton: Bégard
- Intercommunality: Guingamp-Paimpol Agglomération

Government
  - Mayor (2020–2026): Séverine Le Bras
- Area^{1}: 27.05 km^{2} (10.44 sq mi)
- Highest elevation: 302 m (991 ft)
- Lowest elevation: 102 m (335 ft)
- Population (2023): 1,893
  - Density: 69.98/km^{2} (181.3/sq mi)
- Time zone: UTC+01:00 (CET)
  - Summer (DST): UTC+02:00 (CEST)
- INSEE/Postal code: 22164 /22540
- ^{1} French Land Register data, which excludes lakes, ponds, glaciers > 1 km^{2} (0.386 sq mi or 247 acres) and river estuaries.

Pédernec (French pronunciation: [pedɛʁnɛk]; Breton: Pederneg) is a commune in the Côtes-d'Armor department of Brittany in northwestern France.

== Population ==
Historical population
| Year | Pop. | ±% p.a. |
|---|---|---|
| 1968 | 1,629 | — |
| 1975 | 1,527 | −0.92% |
| 1982 | 1,664 | +1.23% |
| 1990 | 1,633 | −0.23% |
| 1999 | 1,654 | +0.14% |
| 2007 | 1,829 | +1.27% |
| 2012 | 1,919 | +0.97% |
| 2017 | 1,851 | −0.72% |
| 2023 | 1,893 | +0.37% |
Source: INSEE

Inhabitants of Pédernec are called pédernécois in French.

== Sights ==
- Manoir de Kermataman - 16th century manor-house with Gothic and Renaissance façades.

== See also ==
- Communes of the Côtes-d'Armor department
