= Trégonneau =

Trégonneau Tregonev
- Commune
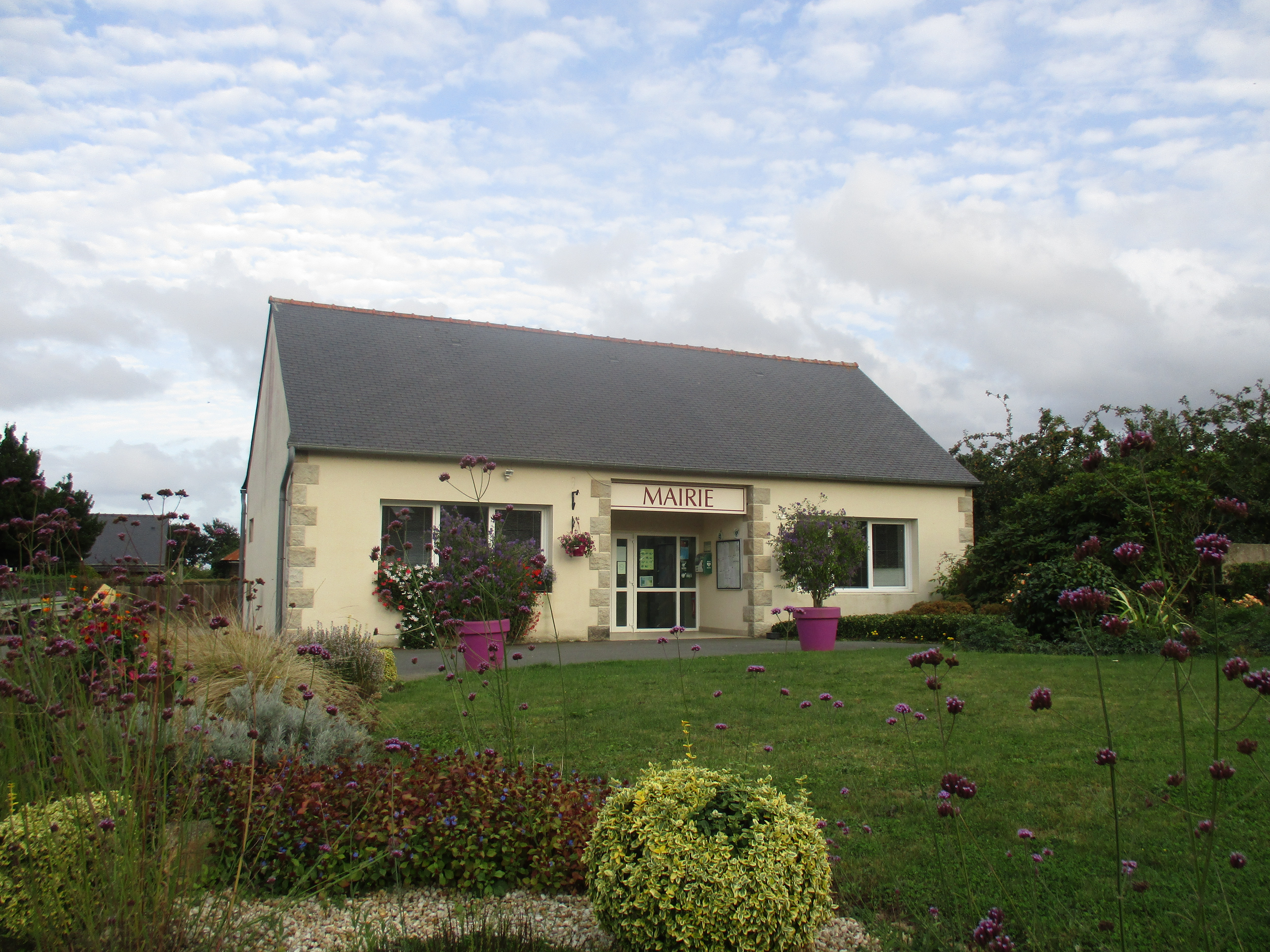
- The town hall of Trégonneau
- Location of Trégonneau
- Location within France Location within Brittany
- Coordinates: 48°36′44″N 3°09′45″W
- Country: France
- Region: Brittany
- Department: Côtes-d'Armor
- Arrondissement: Guingamp
- Canton: Bégard
- Intercommunality: Guingamp-Paimpol Agglomération

Government
  - Mayor (2020–2026): Stéphanie Caradec-Bocher
- Area^{1}: 6.32 km^{2} (2.44 sq mi)
- Highest elevation: 135 m (443 ft)
- Lowest elevation: 43 m (141 ft)
- Population (2023): 515
  - Density: 81.5/km^{2} (211/sq mi)
- Time zone: UTC+01:00 (CET)
  - Summer (DST): UTC+02:00 (CEST)
- INSEE/Postal code: 22358 /22200
- ^{1} French Land Register data, which excludes lakes, ponds, glaciers > 1 km^{2} (0.386 sq mi or 247 acres) and river estuaries.

Trégonneau (French pronunciation: [tʁeɡɔno]; Breton: Tregonev) is a commune in the Côtes-d'Armor department of Brittany in northwestern France.

== Population ==
Historical population
Year	Pop.	±% p.a.
1968	314	—
1975	277	−1.78%
1982	324	+2.26%
1990	363	+1.43%
1999	401	+1.11%
2007	470	+2.00%
2012	527	+2.32%
2017	576	+1.79%
2023	515	−1.85%
Source: INSEE

Inhabitants of Trégonneau are called trégonnois in French.

== See also ==
- Communes of the Côtes-d'Armor department
