= Pont-Melvez =

Pont-Melvez Pont-Melvez
- Commune
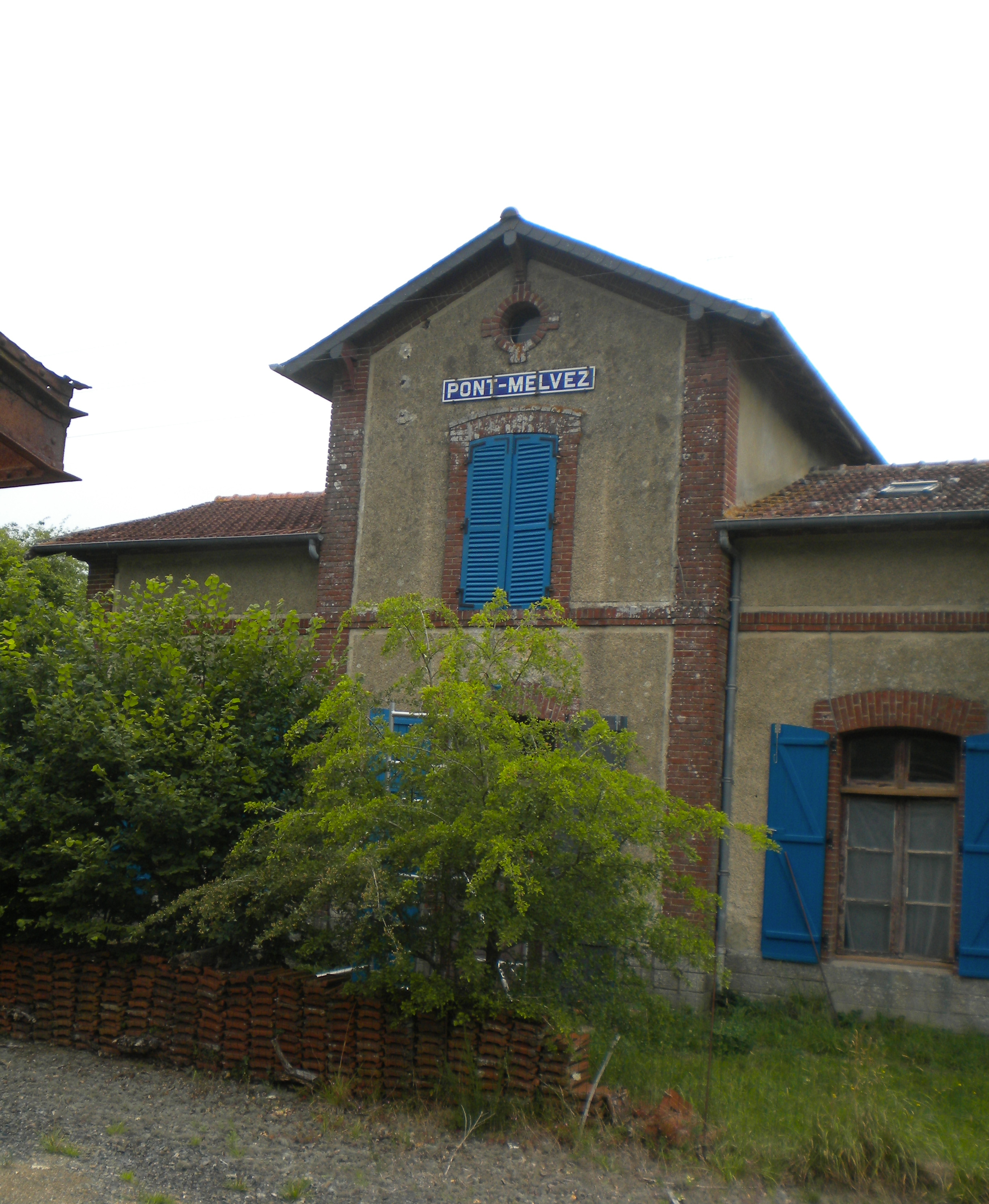
- Train station
- Location of Pont-Melvez
- Location within France Location within Brittany
- Coordinates: 48°27′40″N 3°18′18″W
- Country: France
- Region: Brittany
- Department: Côtes-d'Armor
- Arrondissement: Guingamp
- Canton: Callac
- Intercommunality: Guingamp-Paimpol Agglomération

Government
  - Mayor (2020–2026): Marie-Thérèse Scolan
- Area^{1}: 22.98 km^{2} (8.87 sq mi)
- Highest elevation: 287 m (942 ft)
- Lowest elevation: 182 m (597 ft)
- Population (2023): 595
  - Density: 25.9/km^{2} (67.1/sq mi)
- Time zone: UTC+01:00 (CET)
  - Summer (DST): UTC+02:00 (CEST)
- INSEE/Postal code: 22249 /22390
- ^{1} French Land Register data, which excludes lakes, ponds, glaciers > 1 km^{2} (0.386 sq mi or 247 acres) and river estuaries.

Pont-Melvez (French pronunciation: [pɔ̃ mɛlve]; Breton: Pont-Melvez) is a commune in the Côtes-d'Armor department of Brittany in northwestern France.

== Population ==
Historical population
Year	Pop.	±% p.a.
1968	948	—
1975	754	−3.22%
1982	666	−1.76%
1990	636	−0.57%
1999	631	−0.09%
2007	653	+0.43%
2012	681	+0.84%
2017	603	−2.40%
2023	595	−0.22%
Source: INSEE

Inhabitants of Pont-Melvez are called pont-melvéziens in French. Pont-Melvez's population peaked at 1,808 in 1906 and declined to 615 in 2020.

== Map ==
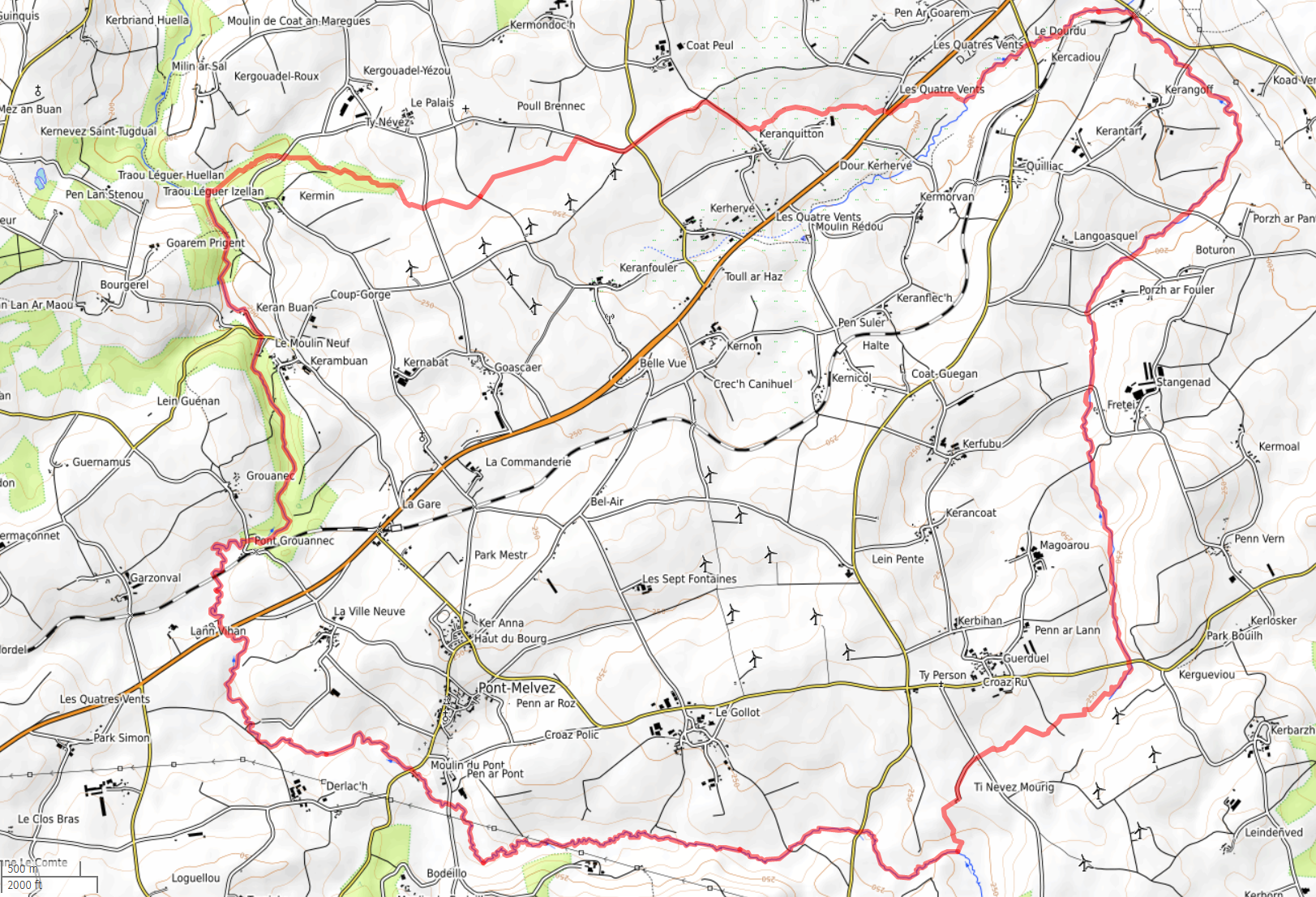
Topographic Map.

== See also ==
- Communes of the Côtes-d'Armor department
