= Loc-Envel =

Loc-Envel Lokenvel
- Commune
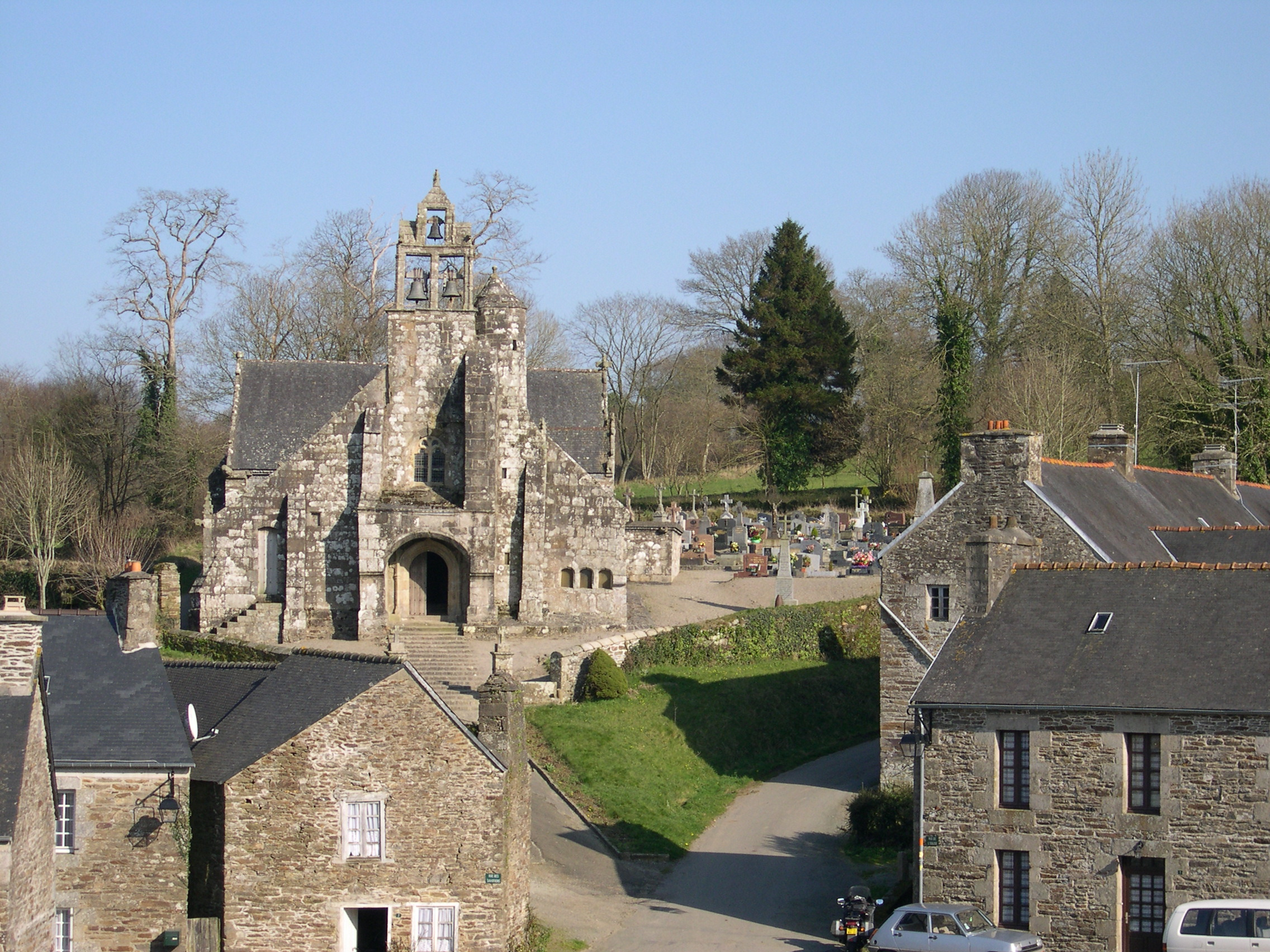
- The church of Saint-Envel and its surroundings
- Location of Loc-Envel
- Location within France Location within Brittany
- Coordinates: 48°31′02″N 3°24′28″W
- Country: France
- Region: Brittany
- Department: Côtes-d'Armor
- Arrondissement: Guingamp
- Canton: Callac
- Intercommunality: Guingamp-Paimpol Agglomération

Government
  - Mayor (2020–2026): Virginie Doyen
- Area^{1}: 3.36 km^{2} (1.30 sq mi)
- Highest elevation: 240 m (790 ft)
- Lowest elevation: 102 m (335 ft)
- Population (2023): 75
  - Density: 22/km^{2} (58/sq mi)
- Time zone: UTC+01:00 (CET)
  - Summer (DST): UTC+02:00 (CEST)
- INSEE/Postal code: 22129 /22810
- ^{1} French Land Register data, which excludes lakes, ponds, glaciers > 1 km^{2} (0.386 sq mi or 247 acres) and river estuaries.

Loc-Envel (French pronunciation: [lɔk ɛnvɛl]; Breton: Lokenvel) is a commune in the Côtes-d'Armor department of Brittany in northwestern France.

== Toponymy ==
From the Breton lok which means hermitage (cf.: Locminé), and Envel a Breton saint.

== Population ==
Inhabitants of Loc-Envel are called locquenvellois or loc-envelistes in French.

== See also ==
- Communes of the Côtes-d'Armor department
- Église Saint-Envel de Loc-Envel
