= Landebaëron =

Landebaëron Landebaeron
- Commune
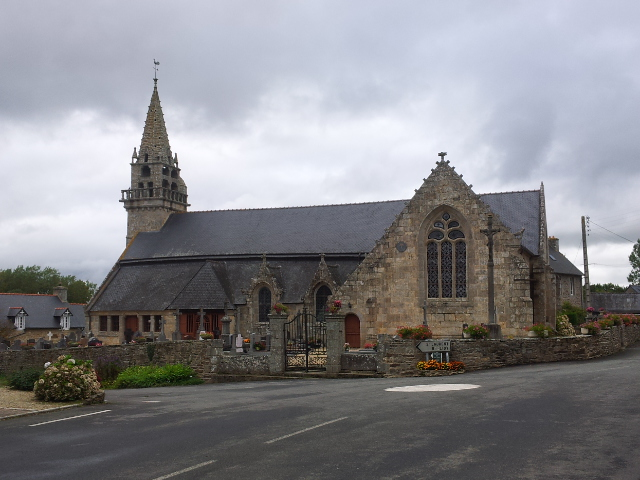
- The church in Landebaëron
- Location of Landebaëron
- Location within France Location within Brittany
- Coordinates: 48°38′07″N 3°12′29″W
- Country: France
- Region: Brittany
- Department: Côtes-d'Armor
- Arrondissement: Guingamp
- Canton: Bégard
- Intercommunality: Guingamp-Paimpol Agglomération

Government
  - Mayor (2020–2026): Sébastien Tondereau
- Area^{1}: 6.44 km^{2} (2.49 sq mi)
- Highest elevation: 113 m (371 ft)
- Lowest elevation: 51 m (167 ft)
- Population (2023): 167
  - Density: 25.9/km^{2} (67.2/sq mi)
- Time zone: UTC+01:00 (CET)
  - Summer (DST): UTC+02:00 (CEST)
- INSEE/Postal code: 22095 /22140
- ^{1} French Land Register data, which excludes lakes, ponds, glaciers > 1 km^{2} (0.386 sq mi or 247 acres) and river estuaries.

Landebaëron (French pronunciation: [lɑ̃dbɛʁɔ̃]; Breton: Landebaeron) is a commune in the Côtes-d'Armor department of Brittany in northwestern France.

== Population ==
Historical population
Year	Pop.	±% p.a.
1968	299	—
1975	231	−3.62%
1982	211	−1.29%
1990	183	−1.76%
1999	186	+0.18%
2007	207	+1.35%
2012	189	−1.80%
2017	189	+0.00%
2023	167	−2.04%
Source: INSEE

Inhabitants of Landebaëron are called landebaëronnais in French.

== See also ==
- Communes of the Côtes-d'Armor department
