= Moustéru =

Moustéru Mousteruz
- Commune
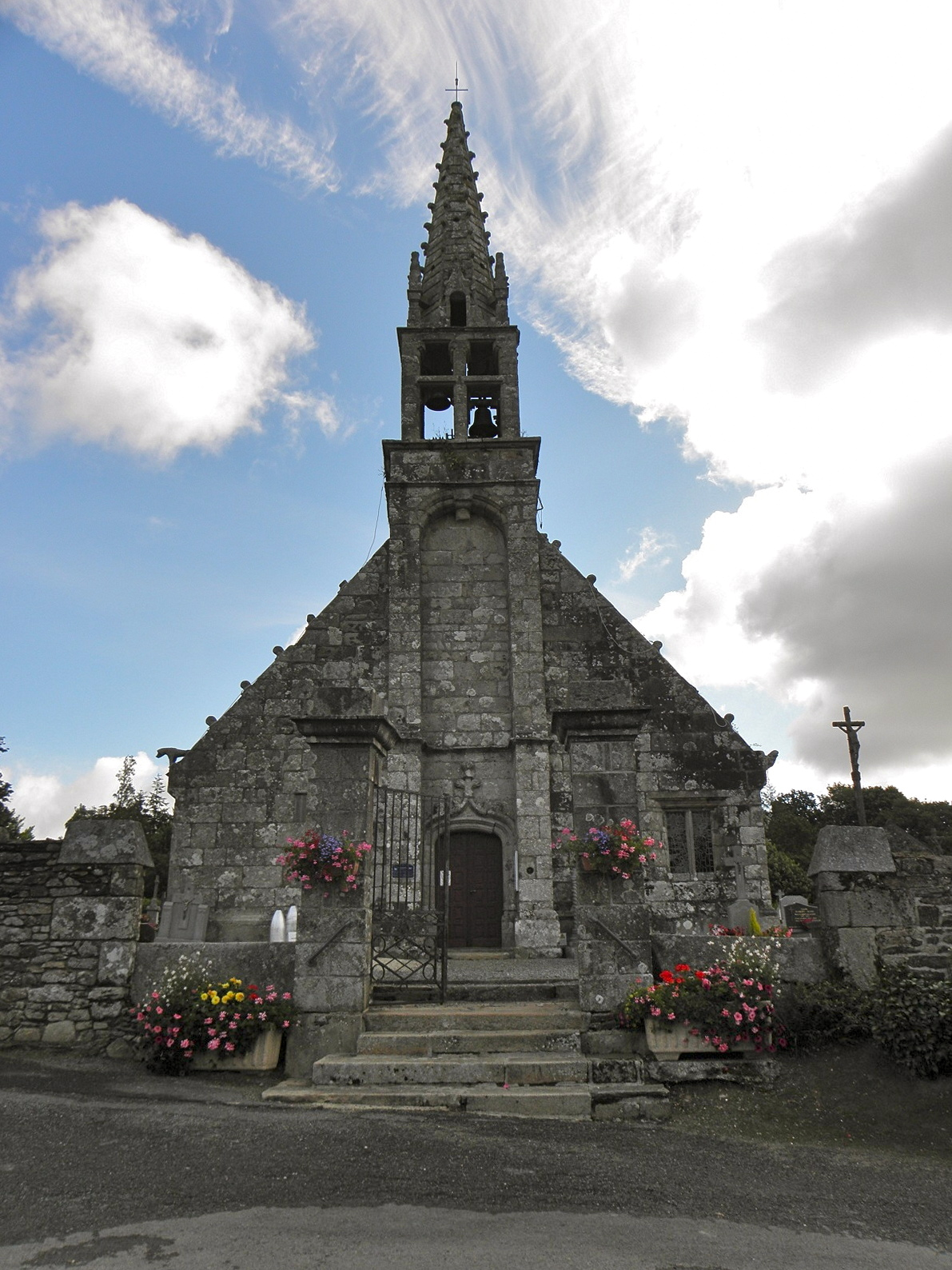
- The church of Notre-Dame, in Moustéru
- Location of Moustéru
- Location within France Location within Brittany
- Coordinates: 48°31′05″N 3°14′16″W
- Country: France
- Region: Brittany
- Department: Côtes-d'Armor
- Arrondissement: Guingamp
- Canton: Callac
- Intercommunality: Guingamp-Paimpol Agglomération

Government
  - Mayor (2020–2026): Frédéric Le Meur
- Area^{1}: 14.28 km^{2} (5.51 sq mi)
- Highest elevation: 295 m (968 ft)
- Lowest elevation: 110 m (360 ft)
- Population (2023): 645
  - Density: 45.2/km^{2} (117/sq mi)
- Time zone: UTC+01:00 (CET)
  - Summer (DST): UTC+02:00 (CEST)
- INSEE/Postal code: 22156 /22200
- ^{1} French Land Register data, which excludes lakes, ponds, glaciers > 1 km^{2} (0.386 sq mi or 247 acres) and river estuaries.

Moustéru (French pronunciation: [musteʁy]; Breton: Mousteruz) is a commune in the Côtes-d'Armor department of Brittany in northwestern France.

== Population ==
Historical population
Year	Pop.	±% p.a.
1968	537	—
1975	511	−0.71%
1982	597	+2.25%
1990	609	+0.25%
1999	594	−0.28%
2007	669	+1.50%
2012	695	+0.77%
2017	660	−1.03%
2023	645	−0.38%
Source: INSEE

Inhabitants of Moustéru are called moustérusiens in French.

== See also ==
- Communes of the Côtes-d'Armor department
