= Calanhel =

Commune in Brittany, France

Calanhel Kalanel
- Commune
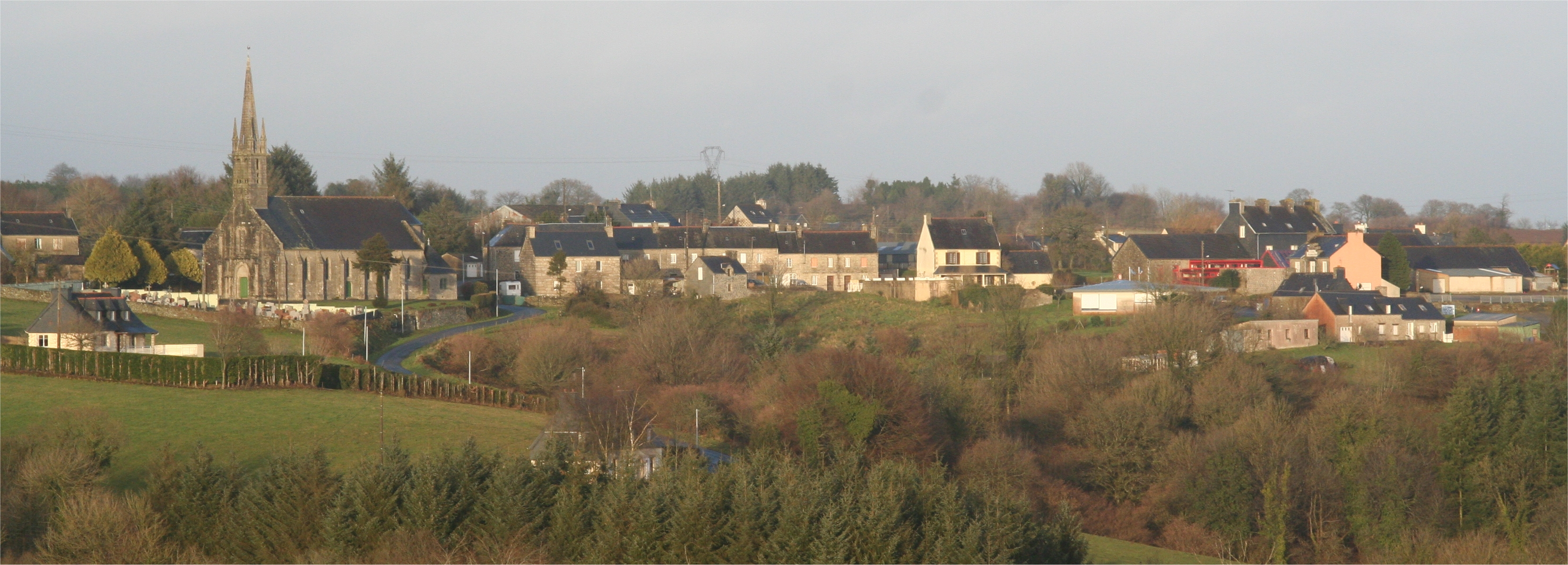
- A general view of Calanhel

- Coat of arms
- Location of Calanhel
- Location within France Location within Brittany
- Coordinates: 48°26′15″N 3°28′46″W
- Country: France
- Region: Brittany
- Department: Côtes-d'Armor
- Arrondissement: Guingamp
- Canton: Callac
- Intercommunality: Guingamp-Paimpol Agglomération

Government
  - Mayor (2020–2026): Cyril Jobic
- Area^{1}: 14.32 km^{2} (5.53 sq mi)
- Highest elevation: 295 m (968 ft)
- Lowest elevation: 168 m (551 ft)
- Population (2023): 245
  - Density: 17.1/km^{2} (44.3/sq mi)
- Time zone: UTC+01:00 (CET)
  - Summer (DST): UTC+02:00 (CEST)
- INSEE/Postal code: 22024 /22160
- ^{1} French Land Register data, which excludes lakes, ponds, glaciers > 1 km^{2} (0.386 sq mi or 247 acres) and river estuaries.

Calanhel (French pronunciation: [kalanɛl]; Breton: Kalanel) is a commune in the Côtes-d'Armor department of Brittany in northwestern France.

== Population ==
Historical population
Year	Pop.	±% p.a.
1968	522	—
1975	422	−2.99%
1982	362	−2.17%
1990	318	−1.61%
1999	264	−2.05%
2007	253	−0.53%
2012	225	−2.32%
2017	217	−0.72%
2023	245	+2.04%
Source: INSEE

Inhabitants of Calanhel are called Calanhelois in French.

== See also ==
- Communes of the Côtes-d'Armor department
