= Louargat =

Louargat Louergad
- Commune
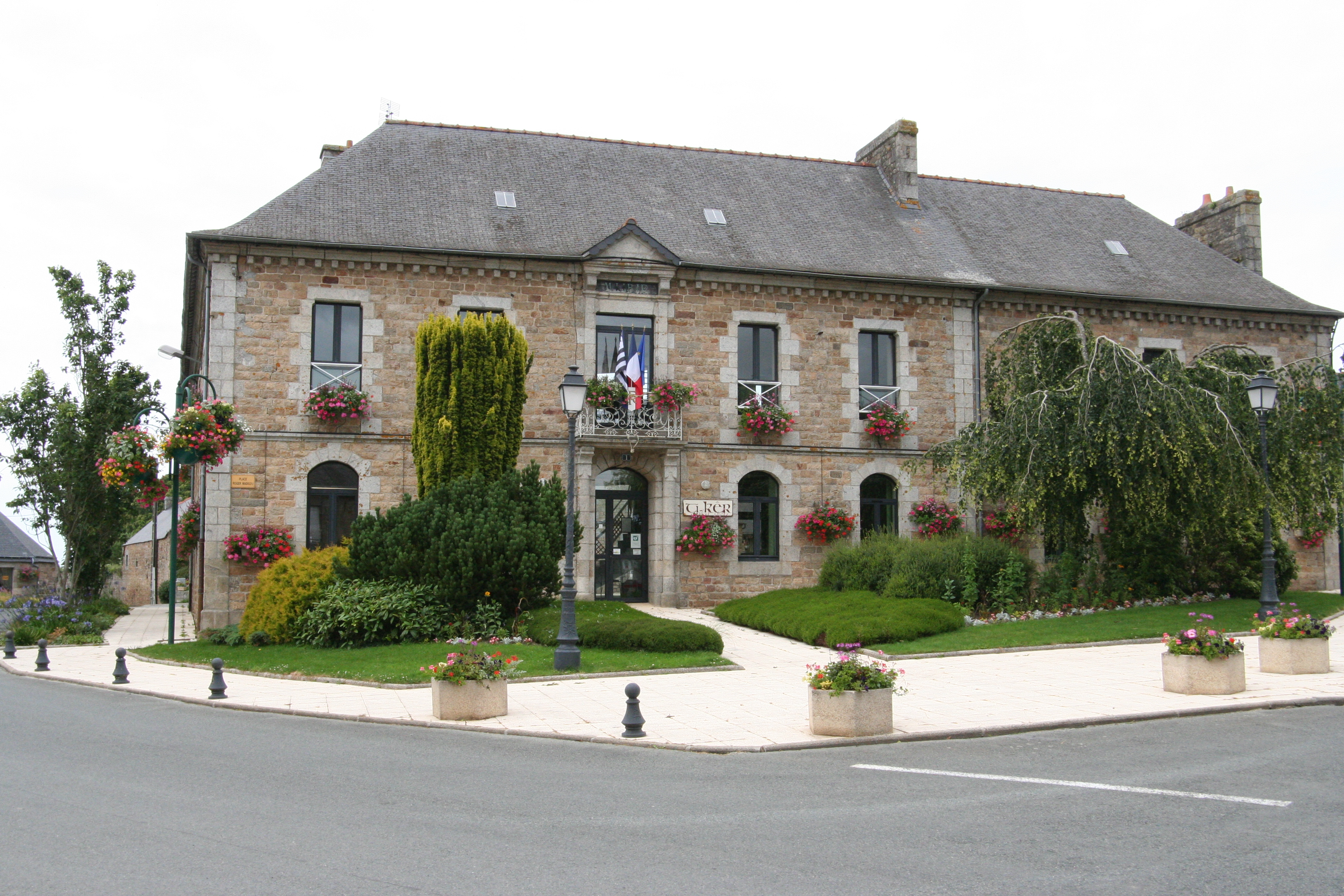
- The town hall in Louargat
- Location of Louargat
- Location within France Location within Brittany
- Coordinates: 48°33′59″N 3°20′14″W
- Country: France
- Region: Brittany
- Department: Côtes-d'Armor
- Arrondissement: Guingamp
- Canton: Callac
- Intercommunality: Guingamp-Paimpol Agglomération

Government
  - Mayor (2020–2026): Hervé L'Heveder
- Area^{1}: 57.23 km^{2} (22.10 sq mi)
- Highest elevation: 301 m (988 ft)
- Lowest elevation: 100 m (330 ft)
- Population (2023): 2,448
  - Density: 42.77/km^{2} (110.8/sq mi)
- Time zone: UTC+01:00 (CET)
  - Summer (DST): UTC+02:00 (CEST)
- INSEE/Postal code: 22135 /22540
- ^{1} French Land Register data, which excludes lakes, ponds, glaciers > 1 km^{2} (0.386 sq mi or 247 acres) and river estuaries.

Louargat (French pronunciation: [lwaʁɡat]; Breton: Louergad) is a commune in the Côtes-d'Armor department of Brittany in northwestern France.

== Geography ==
=== Climate ===
Louargat has an oceanic climate (Köppen climate classification Cfb). The average annual temperature in Louargat is 11.0 °C (51.8 °F). The average annual rainfall is 1,013.3 mm (39.89 in) with December as the wettest month. The temperatures are highest on average in August, at around 17.0 °C (62.6 °F), and lowest in January, at around 6.1 °C (43.0 °F). The highest temperature ever recorded in Louargat was 38.4 °C (101.1 °F) on 9 August 2003; the coldest temperature ever recorded was −11.1 °C (12.0 °F) on 2 January 1997.

Climate data for Louargat (1981–2010 averages, extremes 1987−2016)
Month	Jan	Feb	Mar	Apr	May	Jun	Jul	Aug	Sep	Oct	Nov	Dec	Year
Record high °C (°F)	16.5 (61.7)	19.4 (66.9)	23.1 (73.6)	27.8 (82.0)	29.5 (85.1)	33.2 (91.8)	36.1 (97.0)	38.4 (101.1)	30.9 (87.6)	29.1 (84.4)	20.9 (69.6)	17.8 (64.0)	38.4 (101.1)
Mean daily maximum °C (°F)	9.0 (48.2)	9.7 (49.5)	11.9 (53.4)	13.6 (56.5)	17.2 (63.0)	19.9 (67.8)	21.6 (70.9)	22.1 (71.8)	19.6 (67.3)	15.6 (60.1)	11.8 (53.2)	9.1 (48.4)	15.1 (59.2)
Daily mean °C (°F)	6.1 (43.0)	6.3 (43.3)	7.9 (46.2)	9.1 (48.4)	12.4 (54.3)	14.9 (58.8)	16.8 (62.2)	17.0 (62.6)	14.7 (58.5)	12.0 (53.6)	8.5 (47.3)	6.1 (43.0)	11.0 (51.8)
Mean daily minimum °C (°F)	3.2 (37.8)	3.0 (37.4)	4.0 (39.2)	4.6 (40.3)	7.6 (45.7)	9.9 (49.8)	12.0 (53.6)	11.9 (53.4)	9.8 (49.6)	8.1 (46.6)	5.1 (41.2)	3.1 (37.6)	6.9 (44.4)
Record low °C (°F)	−11.1 (12.0)	−9.3 (15.3)	−8.1 (17.4)	−5.0 (23.0)	−2.9 (26.8)	−0.3 (31.5)	2.9 (37.2)	2.3 (36.1)	0.2 (32.4)	−4.7 (23.5)	−6.9 (19.6)	−8.8 (16.2)	−11.1 (12.0)
Average precipitation mm (inches)	117.4 (4.62)	104.8 (4.13)	79.6 (3.13)	86.4 (3.40)	66.7 (2.63)	50.5 (1.99)	52.3 (2.06)	50.5 (1.99)	65.3 (2.57)	103.8 (4.09)	113.9 (4.48)	122.1 (4.81)	1,013.3 (39.89)
Average precipitation days (≥ 1.0 mm)	16.4	14.0	12.6	13.1	10.6	8.2	9.6	9.0	10.2	15.0	16.4	15.5	150.4
Source: Météo France

== Population ==
Inhabitants of Louargat are called Louargatais in French.

Historical population

Year	Pop.	±% p.a.
1793	4,031	—
1800	3,529	−1.88%
1806	4,419	+3.82%
1821	5,005	+0.83%
1831	5,004	−0.00%
1836	3,833	−5.19%
1841	4,042	+1.07%
1846	4,249	+1.00%
1851	4,428	+0.83%
1856	4,277	−0.69%
1861	4,328	+0.24%
1866	4,357	+0.13%
1872	4,580	+0.84%
1876	4,612	+0.17%
1881	4,311	−1.34%
1886	4,416	+0.48%
1891	4,375	−0.19%
1896	4,346	−0.13%
1901	4,071	−1.30%

Year	Pop.	±% p.a.
1906	3,970	−0.50%
1911	3,779	−0.98%
1921	3,466	−0.86%
1926	3,517	+0.29%
1931	3,104	−2.47%
1936	3,067	−0.24%
1946	2,762	−1.04%
1954	2,570	−0.90%
1962	2,428	−0.71%
1968	2,340	−0.61%
1975	2,179	−1.01%
1982	2,224	+0.29%
1990	2,128	−0.55%
1999	2,126	−0.01%
2007	2,219	+0.54%
2012	2,319	+0.89%
2017	2,343	+0.21%
2023	2,448	+0.73%

Source: EHESS and INSEE (1968-2023)

== Breton language ==
The municipality launched a linguistic plan through Ya d'ar brezhoneg on 14 June 2007. In 2008, 16.06% of primary school children attended bilingual schools.

== See also ==
- Communes of the Côtes-d'Armor department
