= Kermoroc'h =

Kermoroc'h Kervoroc'h
- Commune
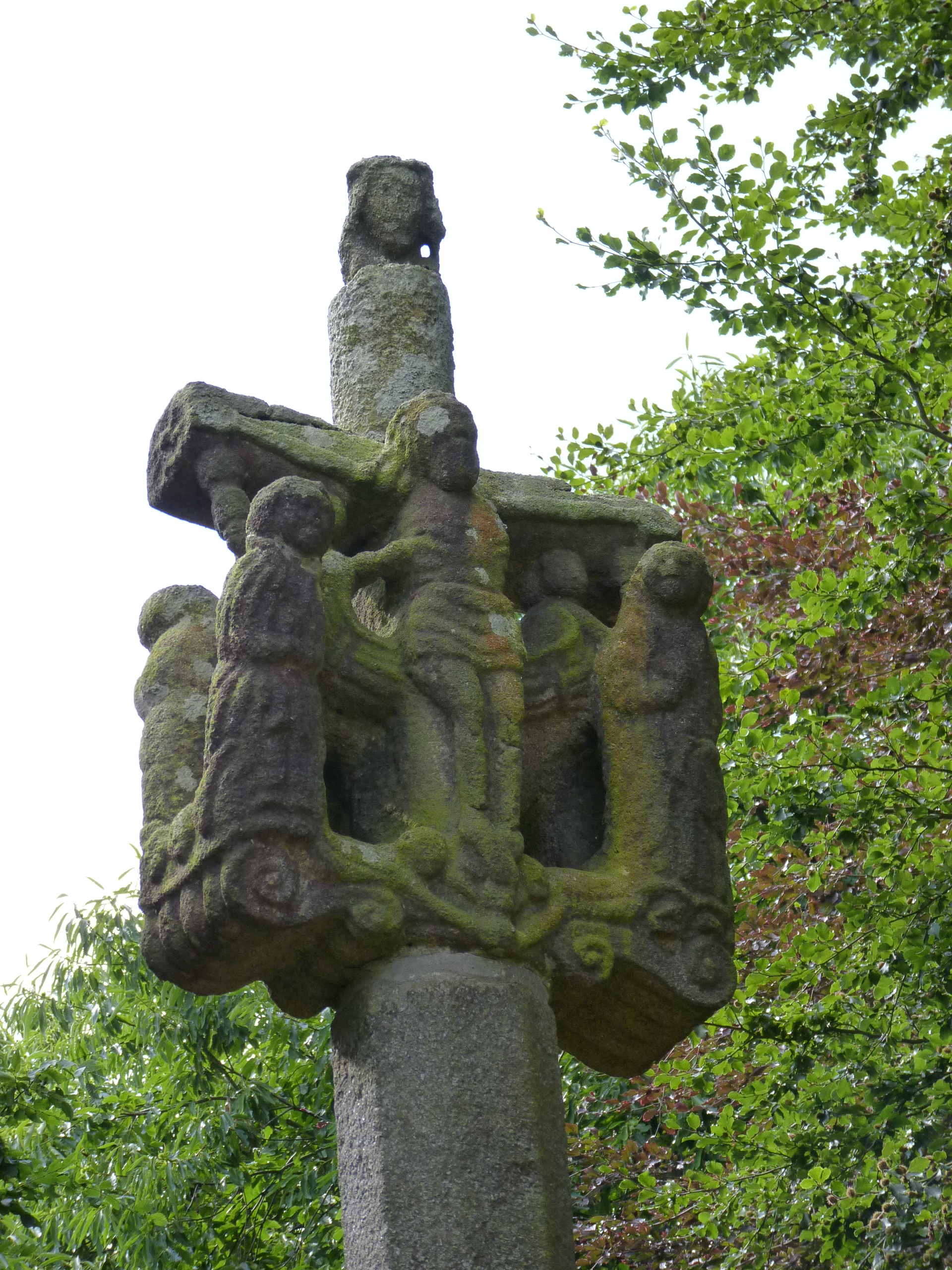
- The calvary of Langouérat, in Kermoroc'h
- Location of Kermoroc'h
- Location within France Location within Brittany
- Coordinates: 48°37′21″N 3°12′19″W
- Country: France
- Region: Brittany
- Department: Côtes-d'Armor
- Arrondissement: Guingamp
- Canton: Bégard
- Intercommunality: Guingamp-Paimpol Agglomération

Government
  - Mayor (2020–2026): Marie Yannick Prigent
- Area^{1}: 6.16 km^{2} (2.38 sq mi)
- Highest elevation: 147 m (482 ft)
- Lowest elevation: 79 m (259 ft)
- Population (2023): 443
  - Density: 71.9/km^{2} (186/sq mi)
- Time zone: UTC+01:00 (CET)
  - Summer (DST): UTC+02:00 (CEST)
- INSEE/Postal code: 22091 /22140
- ^{1} French Land Register data, which excludes lakes, ponds, glaciers > 1 km^{2} (0.386 sq mi or 247 acres) and river estuaries.

Kermoroc'h (Breton: Kervoroc'h) is a commune in the Côtes-d'Armor department in Brittany in northwestern France.

== Population ==
Historical population
Year	Pop.	±% p.a.
1968	326	—
1975	284	−1.95%
1982	283	−0.05%
1990	268	−0.68%
1999	324	+2.13%
2007	386	+2.21%
2012	427	+2.04%
2017	456	+1.32%
2023	443	−0.48%
Source: INSEE

Inhabitants of Kermoroc'h are called kermoroc'hois in French.

== See also ==
- Communes of the Côtes-d'Armor department
