= Kerpert =

Kerpert Kerbêr
- Commune
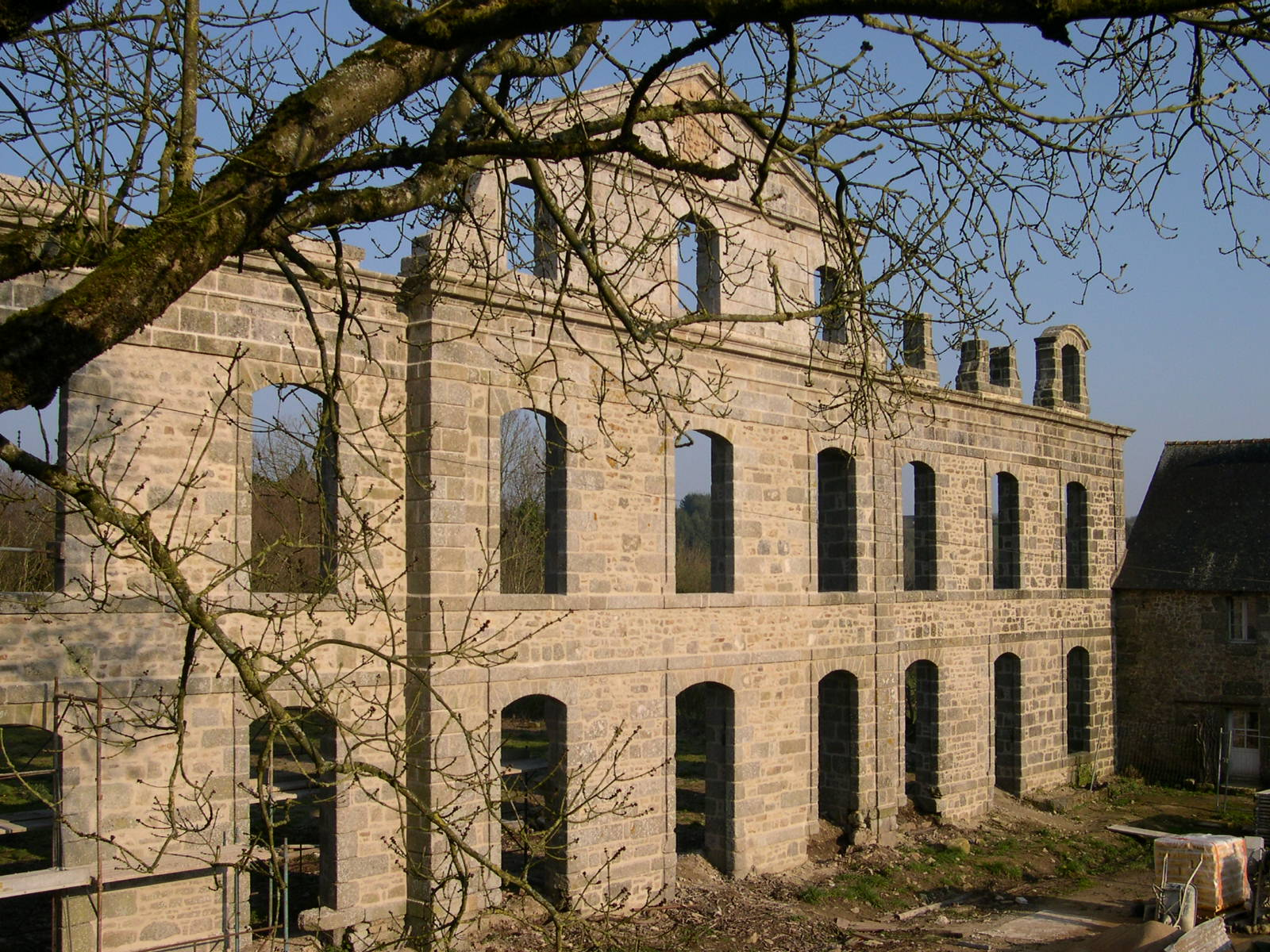
- Abbey of Koad Malouen
- Location of Kerpert
- Location within France Location within Brittany
- Coordinates: 48°22′38″N 3°07′58″W
- Country: France
- Region: Brittany
- Department: Côtes-d'Armor
- Arrondissement: Guingamp
- Canton: Callac
- Intercommunality: Guingamp-Paimpol Agglomération

Government
  - Mayor (2020–2026): Bruno Taloc
- Area^{1}: 21.00 km^{2} (8.11 sq mi)
- Highest elevation: 301 m (988 ft)
- Lowest elevation: 177 m (581 ft)
- Population (2023): 268
  - Density: 12.8/km^{2} (33.1/sq mi)
- Time zone: UTC+01:00 (CET)
  - Summer (DST): UTC+02:00 (CEST)
- INSEE/Postal code: 22092 /22480
- ^{1} French Land Register data, which excludes lakes, ponds, glaciers > 1 km^{2} (0.386 sq mi or 247 acres) and river estuaries.

Kerpert (Breton: Kerbêr) is a commune in the Côtes-d'Armor department of Brittany in northwestern France.

== Geography ==
=== Climate ===
Kerpert has an oceanic climate (Köppen climate classification Cfb). The average annual temperature in Kerpert is 10.7 °C (51.3 °F). The average annual rainfall is 1,130.6 mm (44.51 in) with January as the wettest month. The temperatures are highest on average in August, at around 17.2 °C (63.0 °F), and lowest in January, at around 5.3 °C (41.5 °F). The highest temperature ever recorded in Kerpert was 38.0 °C (100.4 °F) on 9 August 2003; the coldest temperature ever recorded was −12.8 °C (9.0 °F) on 2 January 1997.

Climate data for Kerpert (1981–2010 averages, extremes 1987−present)
Month	Jan	Feb	Mar	Apr	May	Jun	Jul	Aug	Sep	Oct	Nov	Dec	Year
Record high °C (°F)	15.0 (59.0)	20.5 (68.9)	22.2 (72.0)	27.0 (80.6)	29.6 (85.3)	33.7 (92.7)	35.9 (96.6)	38.0 (100.4)	31.5 (88.7)	27.6 (81.7)	20.0 (68.0)	15.3 (59.5)	38.0 (100.4)
Mean daily maximum °C (°F)	7.7 (45.9)	8.5 (47.3)	11.0 (51.8)	12.9 (55.2)	16.5 (61.7)	19.4 (66.9)	21.4 (70.5)	21.9 (71.4)	18.9 (66.0)	14.8 (58.6)	10.6 (51.1)	7.8 (46.0)	14.3 (57.7)
Daily mean °C (°F)	5.3 (41.5)	5.7 (42.3)	7.6 (45.7)	9.0 (48.2)	12.3 (54.1)	14.8 (58.6)	16.8 (62.2)	17.2 (63.0)	14.8 (58.6)	11.7 (53.1)	7.9 (46.2)	5.4 (41.7)	10.7 (51.3)
Mean daily minimum °C (°F)	2.9 (37.2)	2.9 (37.2)	4.1 (39.4)	5.1 (41.2)	8.0 (46.4)	10.3 (50.5)	12.2 (54.0)	12.5 (54.5)	10.8 (51.4)	8.5 (47.3)	5.2 (41.4)	3.0 (37.4)	7.1 (44.8)
Record low °C (°F)	−12.8 (9.0)	−10.8 (12.6)	−5.6 (21.9)	−2.6 (27.3)	0.4 (32.7)	3.3 (37.9)	6.3 (43.3)	6.8 (44.2)	3.3 (37.9)	−2.2 (28.0)	−4.8 (23.4)	−8.3 (17.1)	−12.8 (9.0)
Average precipitation mm (inches)	135.3 (5.33)	116.8 (4.60)	86.7 (3.41)	90.8 (3.57)	72.8 (2.87)	58.3 (2.30)	61.9 (2.44)	58.3 (2.30)	75.4 (2.97)	119.1 (4.69)	123.1 (4.85)	132.1 (5.20)	1,130.6 (44.51)
Average precipitation days (≥ 1.0 mm)	16.6	14.4	13.8	13.5	10.6	8.8	10.4	9.9	10.5	15.7	16.3	16.0	156.5
Source: Météo France

== Population ==
Historical population
Year	Pop.	±% p.a.
1968	536	—
1975	441	−2.75%
1982	407	−1.14%
1990	308	−3.42%
1999	318	+0.36%
2007	297	−0.85%
2012	295	−0.14%
2017	270	−1.76%
2023	268	−0.12%
Source: INSEE

The inhabitants of Kerpert are known in French as kerpertois.

== See also ==
- Communes of the Côtes-d'Armor department
