= Plésidy =

Plésidy Plijidi
- Commune
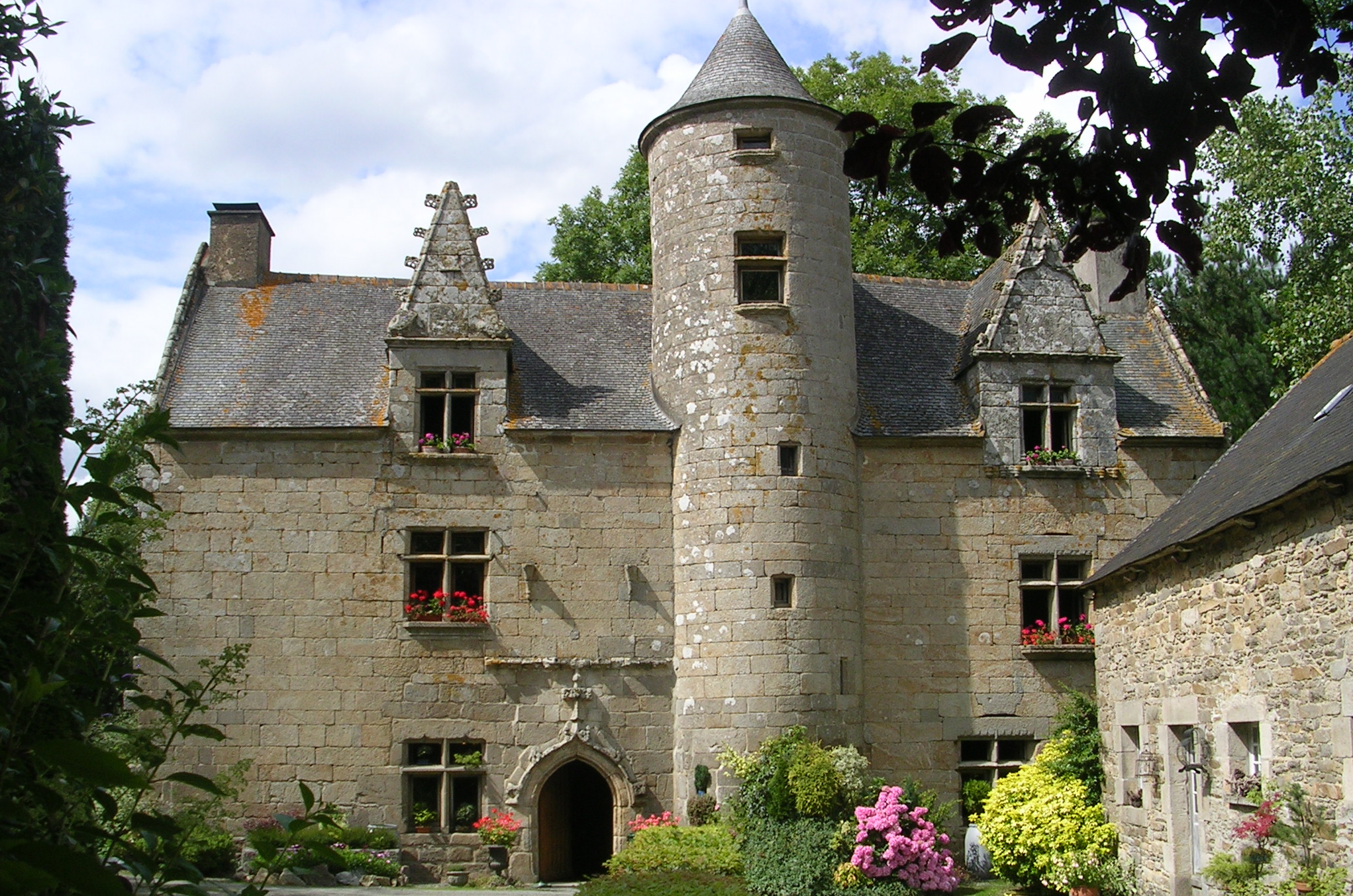
- The manor of Toul-an-golet
- Location of Plésidy
- Location within France Location within Brittany
- Coordinates: 48°26′54″N 3°07′14″W
- Country: France
- Region: Brittany
- Department: Côtes-d'Armor
- Arrondissement: Guingamp
- Canton: Callac
- Intercommunality: Guingamp-Paimpol Agglomération

Government
  - Mayor (2020–2026): Guy Gautier
- Area^{1}: 25.79 km^{2} (9.96 sq mi)
- Highest elevation: 268 m (879 ft)
- Lowest elevation: 95 m (312 ft)
- Population (2023): 563
  - Density: 21.8/km^{2} (56.5/sq mi)
- Time zone: UTC+01:00 (CET)
  - Summer (DST): UTC+02:00 (CEST)
- INSEE/Postal code: 22189 /22720
- ^{1} French Land Register data, which excludes lakes, ponds, glaciers > 1 km^{2} (0.386 sq mi or 247 acres) and river estuaries.

Plésidy (French pronunciation: [plezidi]; Breton: Plijidi) is a commune in the Côtes-d'Armor department of Brittany in northwestern France.

== Population ==
Historical population
Year	Pop.	±% p.a.
1968	870	—
1975	737	−2.34%
1982	709	−0.55%
1990	636	−1.35%
1999	635	−0.02%
2007	671	+0.69%
2012	625	−1.41%
2017	613	−0.39%
2023	563	−1.41%
Source: INSEE

Inhabitants of Plésidy are called plésidiens in French.

== Personalities ==
- French war hero Théophile Marie Brébant (1889-1965) was born here.

== See also ==
- Communes of the Côtes-d'Armor department
