= Kerien =

Kerien Kerien-Boulvriag
- Commune
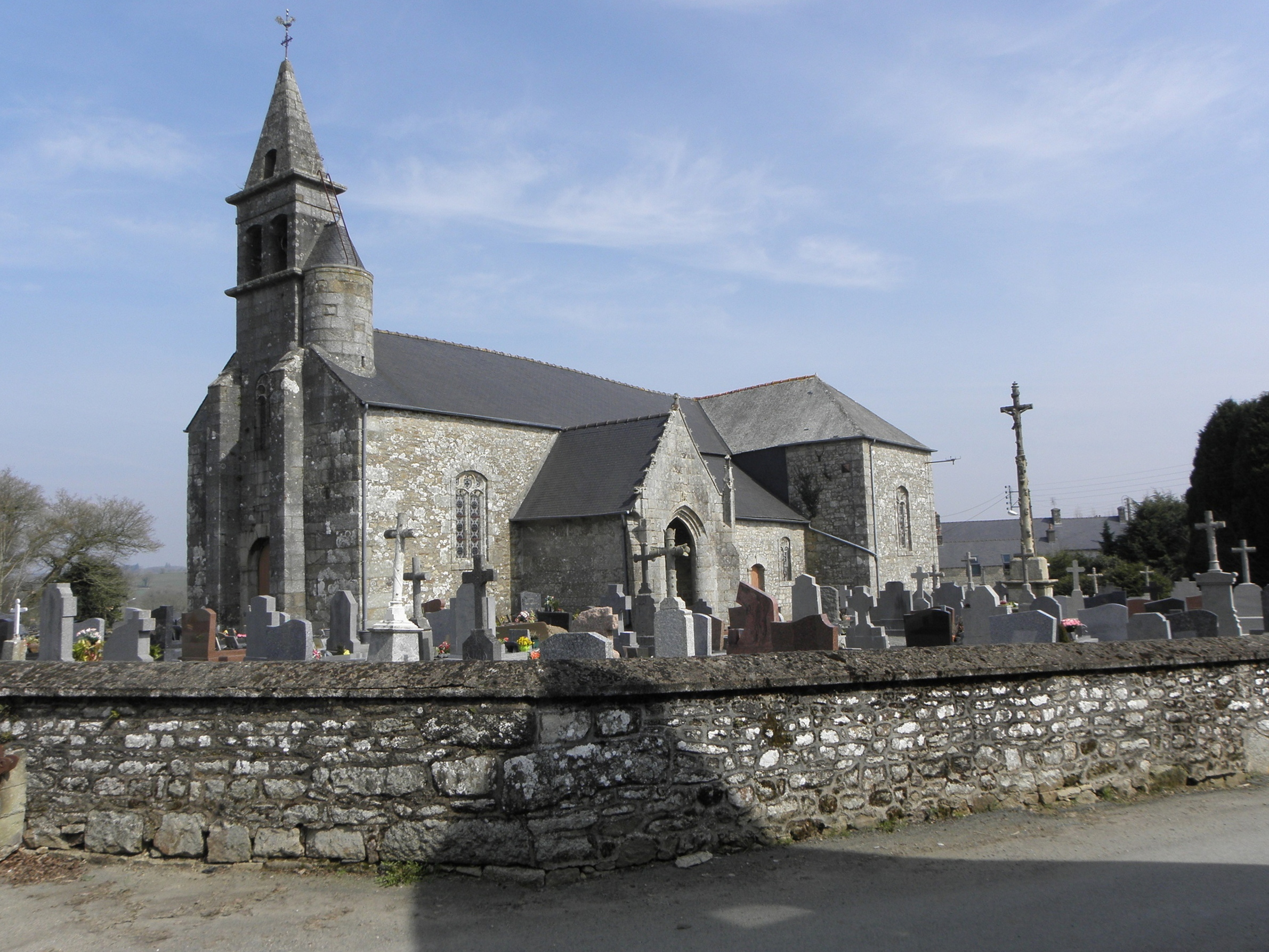
- The church of Saint-Pierre
- Location of Kerien
- Location within France Location within Brittany
- Coordinates: 48°23′27″N 3°12′39″W
- Country: France
- Region: Brittany
- Department: Côtes-d'Armor
- Arrondissement: Guingamp
- Canton: Callac
- Intercommunality: Guingamp-Paimpol Agglomération

Government
  - Mayor (2020–2026): Claude Salomon
- Area^{1}: 21.88 km^{2} (8.45 sq mi)
- Highest elevation: 307 m (1,007 ft)
- Lowest elevation: 223 m (732 ft)
- Population (2023): 245
  - Density: 11.2/km^{2} (29.0/sq mi)
- Time zone: UTC+01:00 (CET)
  - Summer (DST): UTC+02:00 (CEST)
- INSEE/Postal code: 22088 /22480
- ^{1} French Land Register data, which excludes lakes, ponds, glaciers > 1 km^{2} (0.386 sq mi or 247 acres) and river estuaries.

Kerien (French pronunciation: [kɛʁjɛ̃]; Breton: Kerien-Boulvriag) is a commune in the Côtes-d'Armor department of Brittany in northwestern France.

== Population ==
Historical population
Year	Pop.	±% p.a.
1968	499	—
1975	453	−1.37%
1982	342	−3.94%
1990	287	−2.17%
1999	218	−3.01%
2007	268	+2.61%
2012	274	+0.44%
2017	254	−1.50%
2023	245	−0.60%
Source: INSEE

== See also ==
- Communes of the Côtes-d'Armor department
