= Coadout =

Coadout Koadoud
- Commune
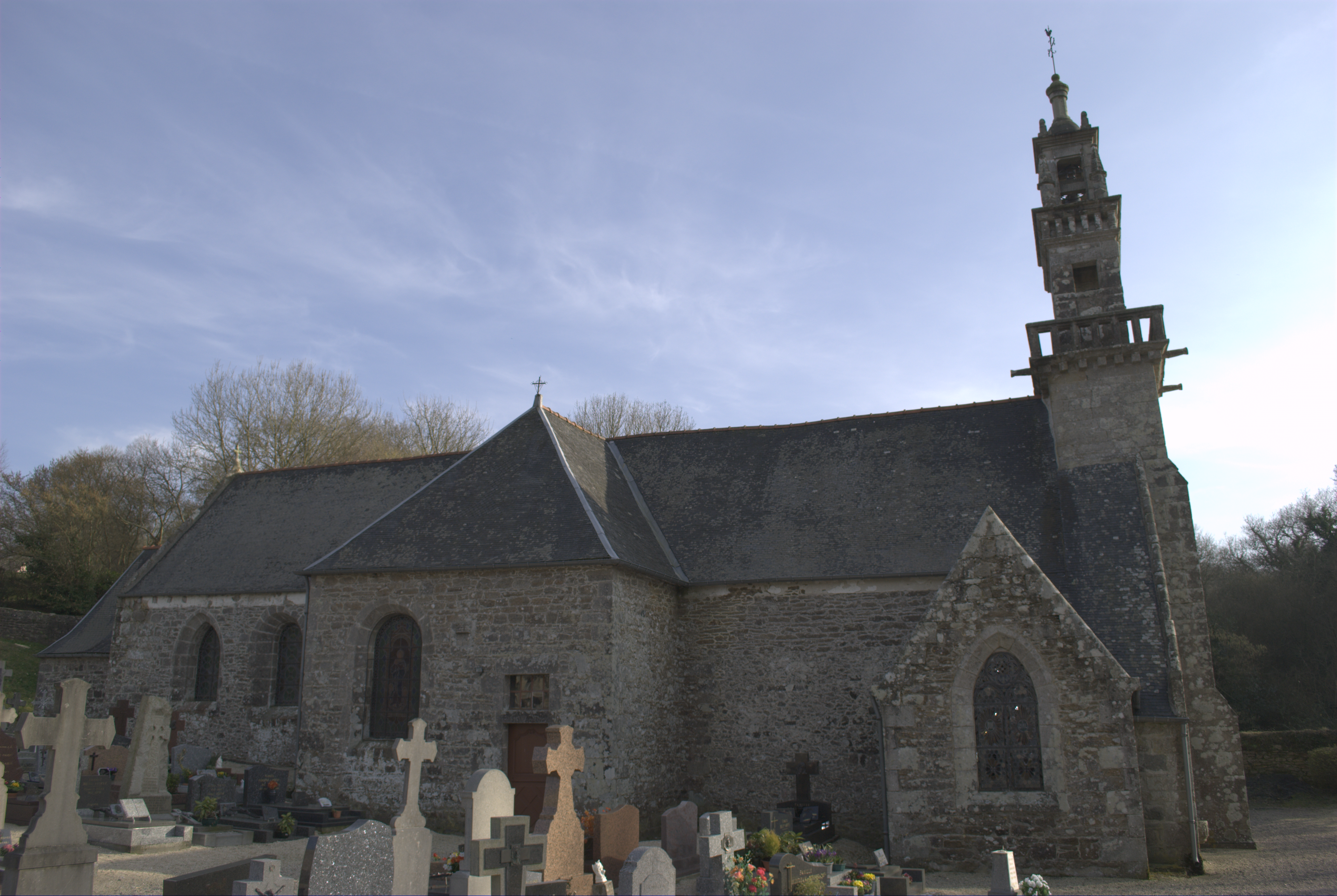
- The church of Saint-Iltud
- Location of Coadout
- Location within France Location within Brittany
- Coordinates: 48°31′05″N 3°11′13″W
- Country: France
- Region: Brittany
- Department: Côtes-d'Armor
- Arrondissement: Guingamp
- Canton: Callac
- Intercommunality: Guingamp-Paimpol Agglomération

Government
  - Mayor (2020–2026): Jean-Pierre Giuntini
- Area^{1}: 9.73 km^{2} (3.76 sq mi)
- Highest elevation: 245 m (804 ft)
- Lowest elevation: 74 m (243 ft)
- Population (2023): 532
  - Density: 54.7/km^{2} (142/sq mi)
- Time zone: UTC+01:00 (CET)
  - Summer (DST): UTC+02:00 (CEST)
- INSEE/Postal code: 22040 /22970
- ^{1} French Land Register data, which excludes lakes, ponds, glaciers > 1 km^{2} (0.386 sq mi or 247 acres) and river estuaries.

Coadout (Breton: Koadoud) is a commune in the Côtes-d'Armor department of Brittany in northwestern France.

== Toponymy ==
This village was known as "Coatnoüet ( = Coatvoüet), 1160-1167; Coetuout, 1382; Quoetvout, 1427; Coitbout, 1434; Coetbout, 1477; Coatout, 1481; Coetdout, 1535; Coadoult, 1581.

The name Coadout is typically Breton, "koad" meaning "wood" and possibly the Old French word "nouë" via the Gaulish word "nauda" meaning "marsh" or from the Old Breton "but", "bot" and "bod" meaning "residence". Another interpretation gives the radical -out the etymology of Illtud.

== Population ==
Historical population
Year	Pop.	±% p.a.
1968	331	—
1975	299	−1.44%
1982	401	+4.28%
1990	483	+2.35%
1999	497	+0.32%
2007	512	+0.37%
2012	569	+2.13%
2017	580	+0.38%
2023	532	−1.43%
Source: INSEE

Inhabitants of Coadout are called Coadoutais in French.

== See also ==
- Communes of the Côtes-d'Armor department
