= Plougonver =

Plougonver Plougonveur
- Commune
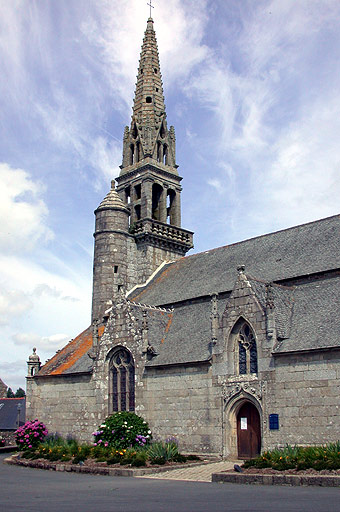
- The church of St. Pierre

- Coat of arms
- Location of Plougonver
- Location within France Location within Brittany
- Coordinates: 48°29′07″N 3°22′38″W
- Country: France
- Region: Brittany
- Department: Côtes-d'Armor
- Arrondissement: Guingamp
- Canton: Callac
- Intercommunality: Guingamp-Paimpol Agglomération

Government
  - Mayor (2020–2026): Christian Prigent
- Area^{1}: 35.72 km^{2} (13.79 sq mi)
- Highest elevation: 320 m (1,050 ft)
- Lowest elevation: 142 m (466 ft)
- Population (2023): 760
  - Density: 21/km^{2} (55/sq mi)
- Time zone: UTC+01:00 (CET)
  - Summer (DST): UTC+02:00 (CEST)
- INSEE/Postal code: 22216 /22810
- ^{1} French Land Register data, which excludes lakes, ponds, glaciers > 1 km^{2} (0.386 sq mi or 247 acres) and river estuaries.

Plougonver (French pronunciation: [pluɡɔ̃vɛʁ]; Breton: Plougonveur) is a commune in the Côtes-d'Armor department of Brittany in northwestern France.

On Sunday 13 September 1942 a British Royal Air Force Bristol Blenheim bomber sustained damage from German flak during an air raid on Morlaix, Brittany. The bomber crashed in flames near the village of Kergus, 1 km south of Plougonver. Yvonne Coantiec, wife of Jean Coantiec the Mayor of Plougonver was told of the crash, attended the scene and assisted the crew, providing civilian clothes and shelter. The crew members eventually made good their escape to England via Nantes.

Yvonne Coantiec was questioned on several occasions by the Germans and was subsequently detained in St. Brieuc prison in March 1943 for assisting the airmen. She was transferred to Fresnes Prison south of Paris, then to Ravensbruck Concentration Camp in Northern Germany, and later to Mauthausen Labour Camp, Austria, infamous for its overcrowding and harsh regime. She died there in 1945, aged 45.

The Coantiec name lives on in Plougonver today. The Community Centre is named Jean Coantiec.

== Population ==
Historical population
Year	Pop.	±% p.a.
1968	1,374	—
1975	1,155	−2.45%
1982	998	−2.07%
1990	868	−1.73%
1999	768	−1.35%
2007	702	−1.12%
2012	727	+0.70%
2017	733	+0.16%
2023	760	+0.60%
Source: INSEE

Inhabitants of Plougonver are called plougonverois or plougonverrois in French.

== See also ==
- Communes of the Côtes-d'Armor department
