= Senven-Léhart =

Senven-Léhart Senven-Lehard
- Commune
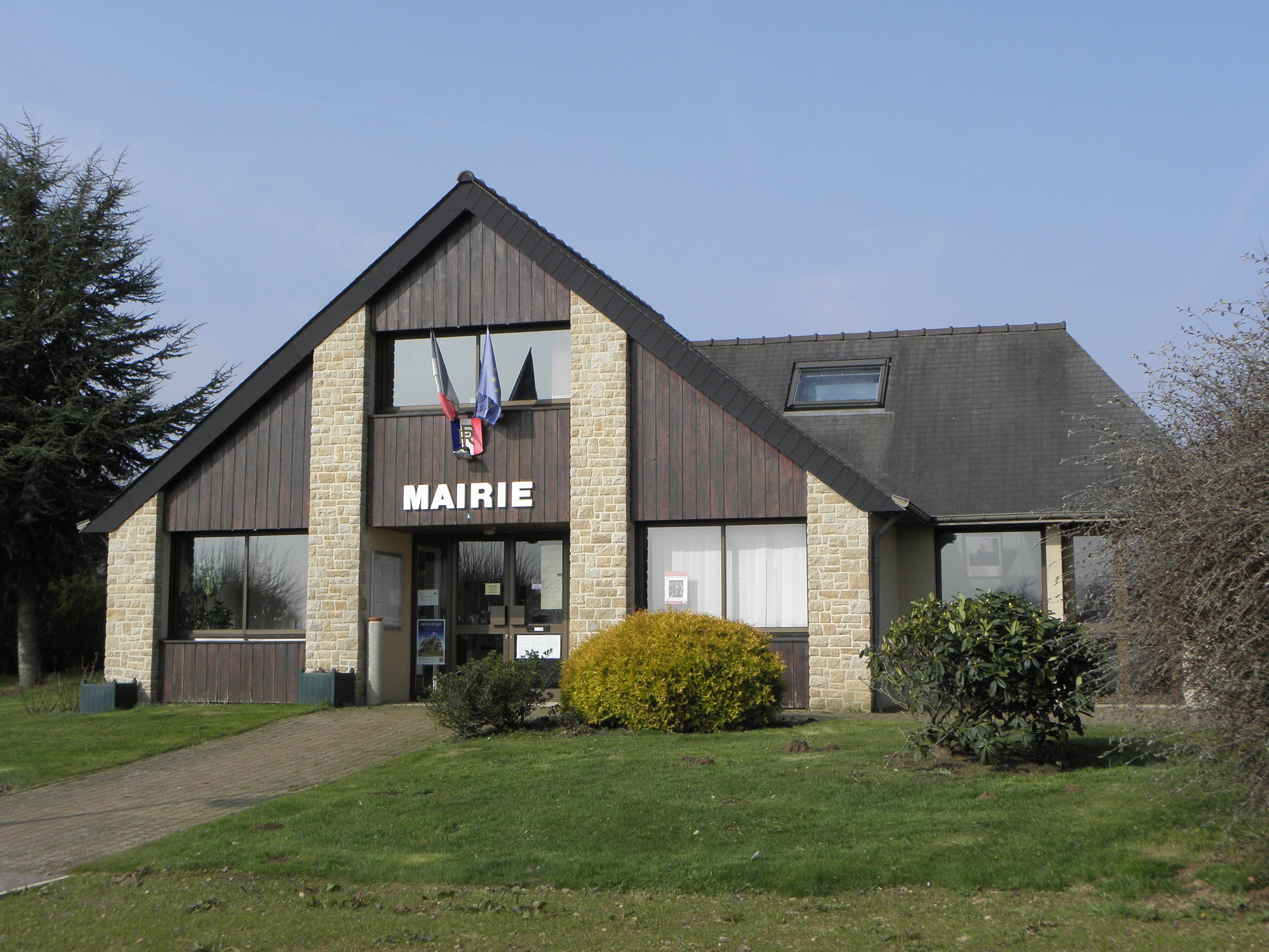
- The town hall of Senven-Léhart
- Location of Senven-Léhart
- Location within France Location within Brittany
- Coordinates: 48°25′33″N 3°04′05″W
- Country: France
- Region: Brittany
- Department: Côtes-d'Armor
- Arrondissement: Guingamp
- Canton: Callac
- Intercommunality: Guingamp-Paimpol Agglomération

Government
  - Mayor (2020–2026): Gilbert Burlot
- Area^{1}: 12.50 km^{2} (4.83 sq mi)
- Highest elevation: 266 m (873 ft)
- Lowest elevation: 120 m (390 ft)
- Population (2023): 235
  - Density: 18.8/km^{2} (48.7/sq mi)
- Time zone: UTC+01:00 (CET)
  - Summer (DST): UTC+02:00 (CEST)
- INSEE/Postal code: 22335 /22720
- ^{1} French Land Register data, which excludes lakes, ponds, glaciers > 1 km^{2} (0.386 sq mi or 247 acres) and river estuaries.

Senven-Léhart (French pronunciation: [sɛ̃vɛ̃ leaʁ]; Breton: Senven-Lehard) is a commune in the Côtes-d'Armor department of Brittany in northwestern France. It is about 16 km south of Ploumagoar.

The chapel of Saint-Tugdual dates from the 16th century, and the village Calvary dates from the 17th century and is a scheduled monument.

== Population ==
Historical population
Year	Pop.	±% p.a.
1968	391	—
1975	335	−2.18%
1982	305	−1.33%
1990	292	−0.54%
1999	250	−1.71%
2007	246	−0.20%
2012	234	−1.00%
2017	234	+0.00%
2023	235	+0.07%
Source: INSEE

Inhabitants of Senven-Léhart are called senvennois in French.

== See also ==
- Communes of the Côtes-d'Armor department
- Roland Doré sculptor
