= Callac =

Callac Kallag
- Commune
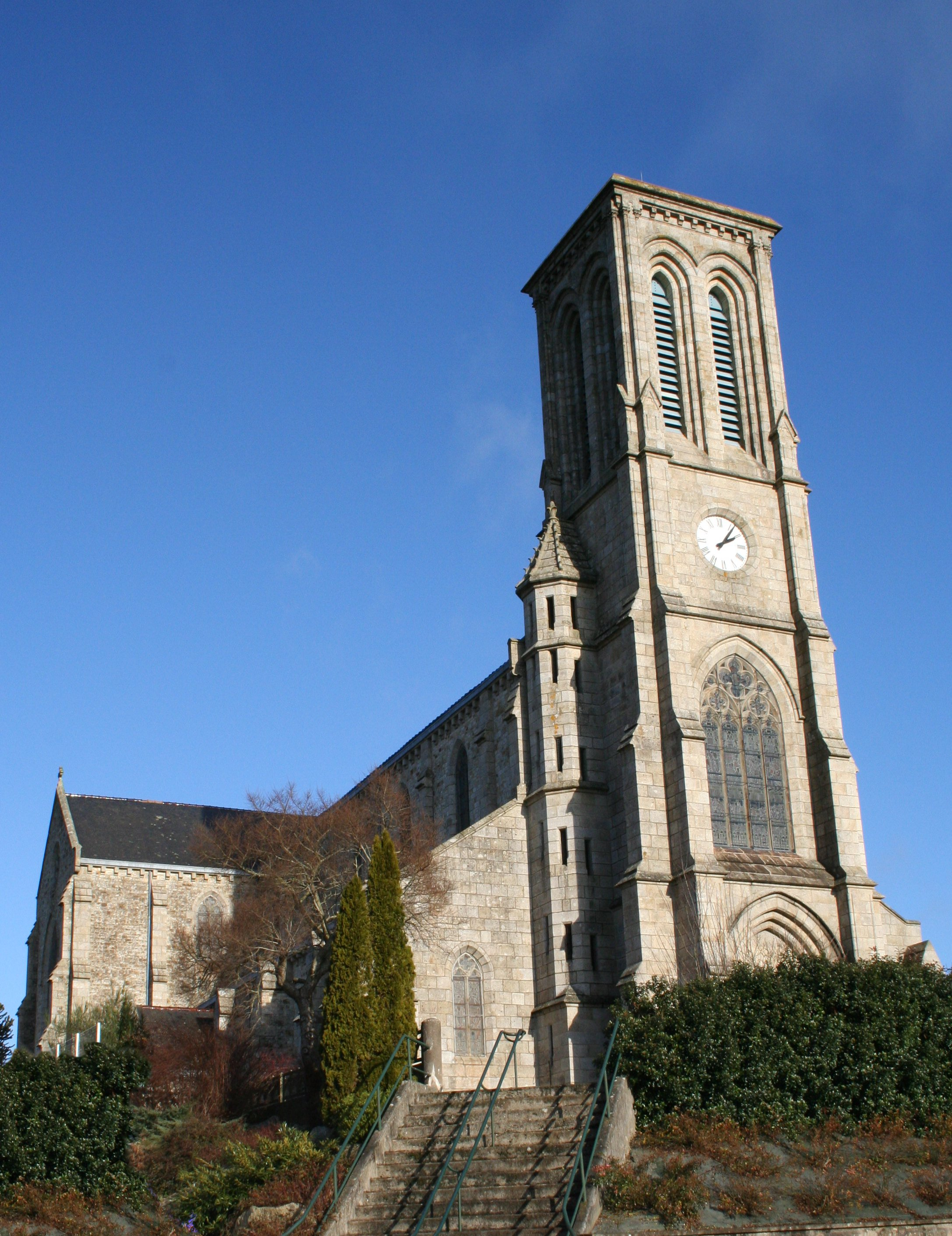
- The church of Saint-Laurent

- Coat of arms
- Location of Callac
- Location within France Location within Brittany
- Coordinates: 48°24′18″N 3°25′36″W
- Country: France
- Region: Brittany
- Department: Côtes-d'Armor
- Arrondissement: Guingamp
- Canton: Callac
- Intercommunality: Guingamp-Paimpol Agglomération

Government
  - Mayor (2020–2026): Jean-Yves Rolland
- Area^{1}: 33.03 km^{2} (12.75 sq mi)
- Highest elevation: 291 m (955 ft)
- Lowest elevation: 116 m (381 ft)
- Population (2023): 2,312
  - Density: 70.00/km^{2} (181.3/sq mi)
- Time zone: UTC+01:00 (CET)
  - Summer (DST): UTC+02:00 (CEST)
- INSEE/Postal code: 22025 /22160
- ^{1} French Land Register data, which excludes lakes, ponds, glaciers > 1 km^{2} (0.386 sq mi or 247 acres) and river estuaries.

Callac (French pronunciation: [kalak]; Breton: Kallag) is a commune in the Côtes-d'Armor department in Brittany in north-western France.

== Geography ==
Callac is located 30 km (19 mi) south-west of Guingamp and 20 km (12 mi) north-east of Carhaix, Finistère.

== Landmarks ==
- Botmel Chapel
- Naous statue, by Georges Lucien Guyot
- Callac Church
- Roman bridge

== Population ==
Inhabitants of Callac are called Callacois in French.

Historical population
Year	Pop.	±% p.a.
1968	3,043	—
1975	3,024	−0.09%
1982	2,872	−0.73%
1990	2,592	−1.27%
1999	2,459	−0.58%
2007	2,363	−0.50%
2012	2,279	−0.72%
2017	2,213	−0.59%
2023	2,312	+0.73%
Source: INSEE

== See also ==
- Communes of the Côtes-d'Armor department
