= Squiffiec =

Squiffiec Skiñvieg
- Commune
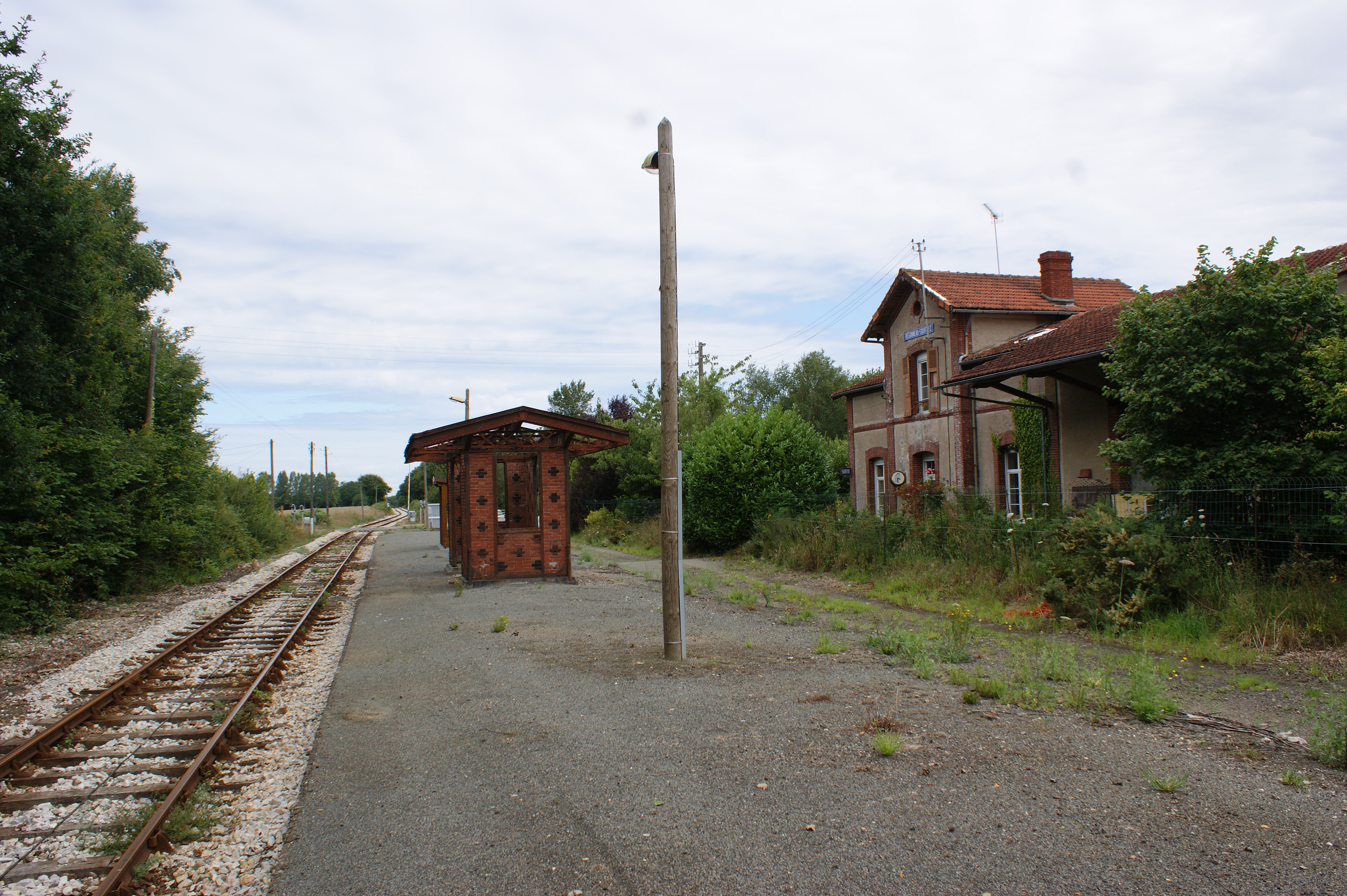
- Train station

- Coat of arms
- Location of Squiffiec
- Location within France Location within Brittany
- Coordinates: 48°37′41″N 3°09′10″W
- Country: France
- Region: Brittany
- Department: Côtes-d'Armor
- Arrondissement: Guingamp
- Canton: Bégard
- Intercommunality: Guingamp-Paimpol Agglomération

Government
  - Mayor (2020–2026): Yvon Le Moigne
- Area^{1}: 10.80 km^{2} (4.17 sq mi)
- Highest elevation: 123 m (404 ft)
- Lowest elevation: 25 m (82 ft)
- Population (2023): 747
  - Density: 69.2/km^{2} (179/sq mi)
- Time zone: UTC+01:00 (CET)
  - Summer (DST): UTC+02:00 (CEST)
- INSEE/Postal code: 22338 /22200
- ^{1} French Land Register data, which excludes lakes, ponds, glaciers > 1 km^{2} (0.386 sq mi or 247 acres) and river estuaries.

Squiffiec (French pronunciation: [skifjɛk]; Breton: Skiñvieg) is a commune in the Côtes-d'Armor department of Brittany in northwestern France.

== Population ==
Historical population
Year	Pop.	±% p.a.
1968	581	—
1975	527	−1.38%
1982	629	+2.56%
1990	560	−1.44%
1999	587	+0.52%
2007	728	+2.73%
2012	798	+1.85%
2017	762	−0.92%
2023	747	−0.33%
Source: INSEE

The inhabitants of Squiffiec are known in French as squiffiécois.

== See also ==
- Communes of the Côtes-d'Armor department
