= Saint-Agathon =

Saint-Agathon Sant-Eganton
- Commune
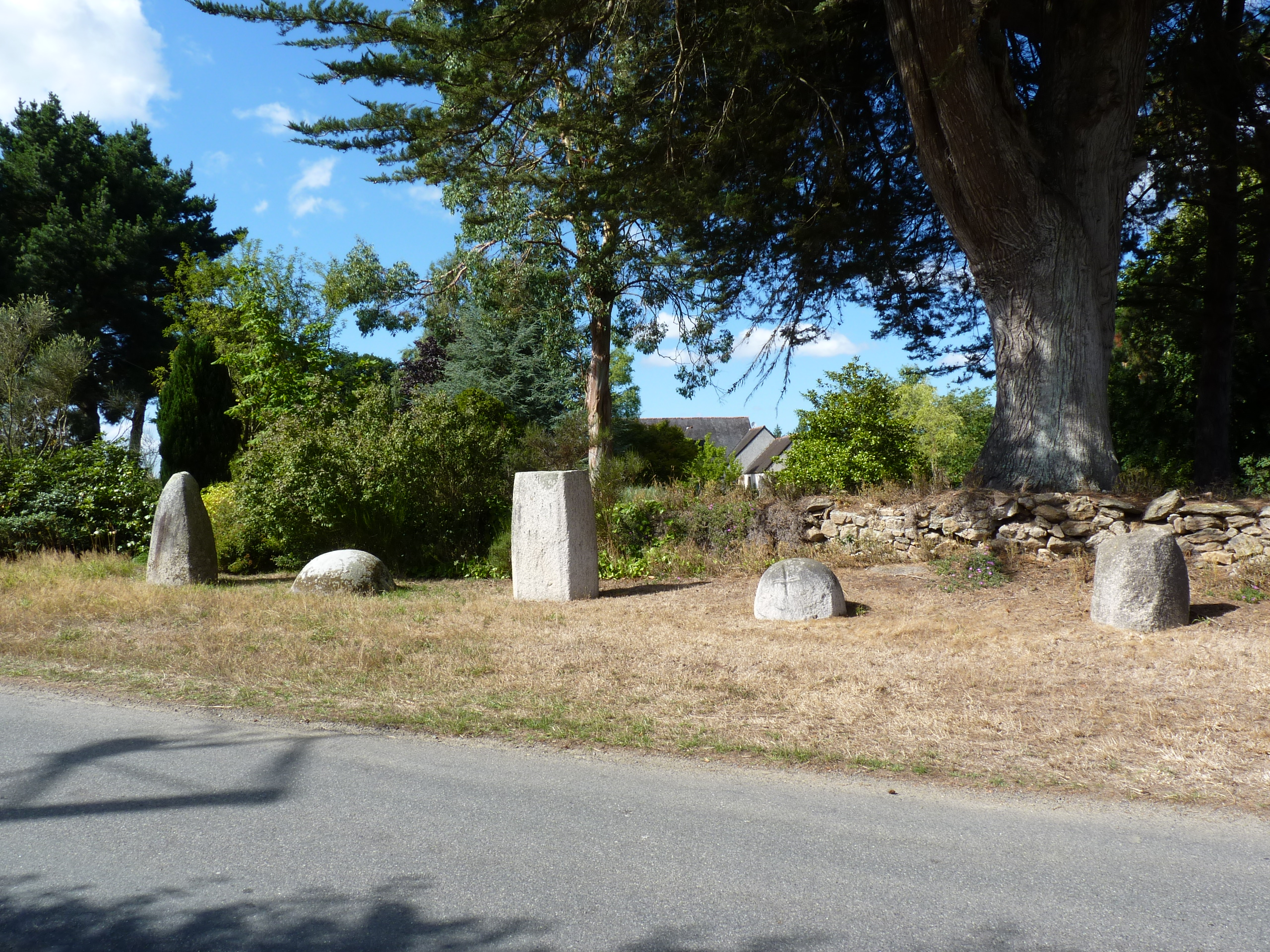
- A group of five Gallic steles in Saint-Agathon
- Location of Saint-Agathon
- Location within France Location within Brittany
- Coordinates: 48°33′35″N 3°06′12″W
- Country: France
- Region: Brittany
- Department: Côtes-d'Armor
- Arrondissement: Guingamp
- Canton: Guingamp
- Intercommunality: Guingamp-Paimpol Agglomération

Government
  - Mayor (2020–2026): Anne-Marie Pasquiet
- Area^{1}: 14.56 km^{2} (5.62 sq mi)
- Highest elevation: 146 m (479 ft)
- Lowest elevation: 80 m (260 ft)
- Population (2023): 2,169
  - Density: 149.0/km^{2} (385.8/sq mi)
- Time zone: UTC+01:00 (CET)
  - Summer (DST): UTC+02:00 (CEST)
- INSEE/Postal code: 22272 /22200
- ^{1} French Land Register data, which excludes lakes, ponds, glaciers > 1 km^{2} (0.386 sq mi or 247 acres) and river estuaries.

Saint-Agathon (French pronunciation: [sɛ̃.t‿aɡatɔ̃]; Breton: Sant-Eganton) is a commune in the Côtes-d'Armor department of Brittany in northwestern France.

== Population ==
Inhabitants of Saint-Agathon are called saint-agathonnais in French.

Historical population

Year	Pop.	±% p.a.
1793	850	—
1800	891	+0.68%
1806	929	+0.70%
1821	890	−0.29%
1831	928	+0.42%
1836	945	+0.36%
1841	972	+0.57%
1846	1,009	+0.75%
1851	1,021	+0.24%
1856	1,024	+0.06%
1861	1,015	−0.18%
1866	1,028	+0.25%
1872	1,015	−0.21%
1876	1,057	+1.02%
1881	1,114	+1.06%
1886	1,125	+0.20%
1891	1,130	+0.09%
1896	1,121	−0.16%
1901	1,060	−1.11%

Year	Pop.	±% p.a.
1906	1,038	−0.42%
1911	1,007	−0.60%
1921	973	−0.34%
1926	945	−0.58%
1931	955	+0.21%
1936	970	+0.31%
1946	982	+0.12%
1954	924	−0.76%
1962	899	−0.34%
1968	890	−0.17%
1975	1,106	+3.15%
1982	1,331	+2.68%
1990	1,453	+1.10%
1999	1,783	+2.30%
2007	2,002	+1.46%
2012	2,180	+1.72%
2017	2,273	+0.84%
2023	2,169	−0.78%

Source: EHESS and INSEE (1968-2023)

== See also ==
- Communes of the Côtes-d'Armor department
