= Lohuec =

Lohuec Lohueg
- Commune
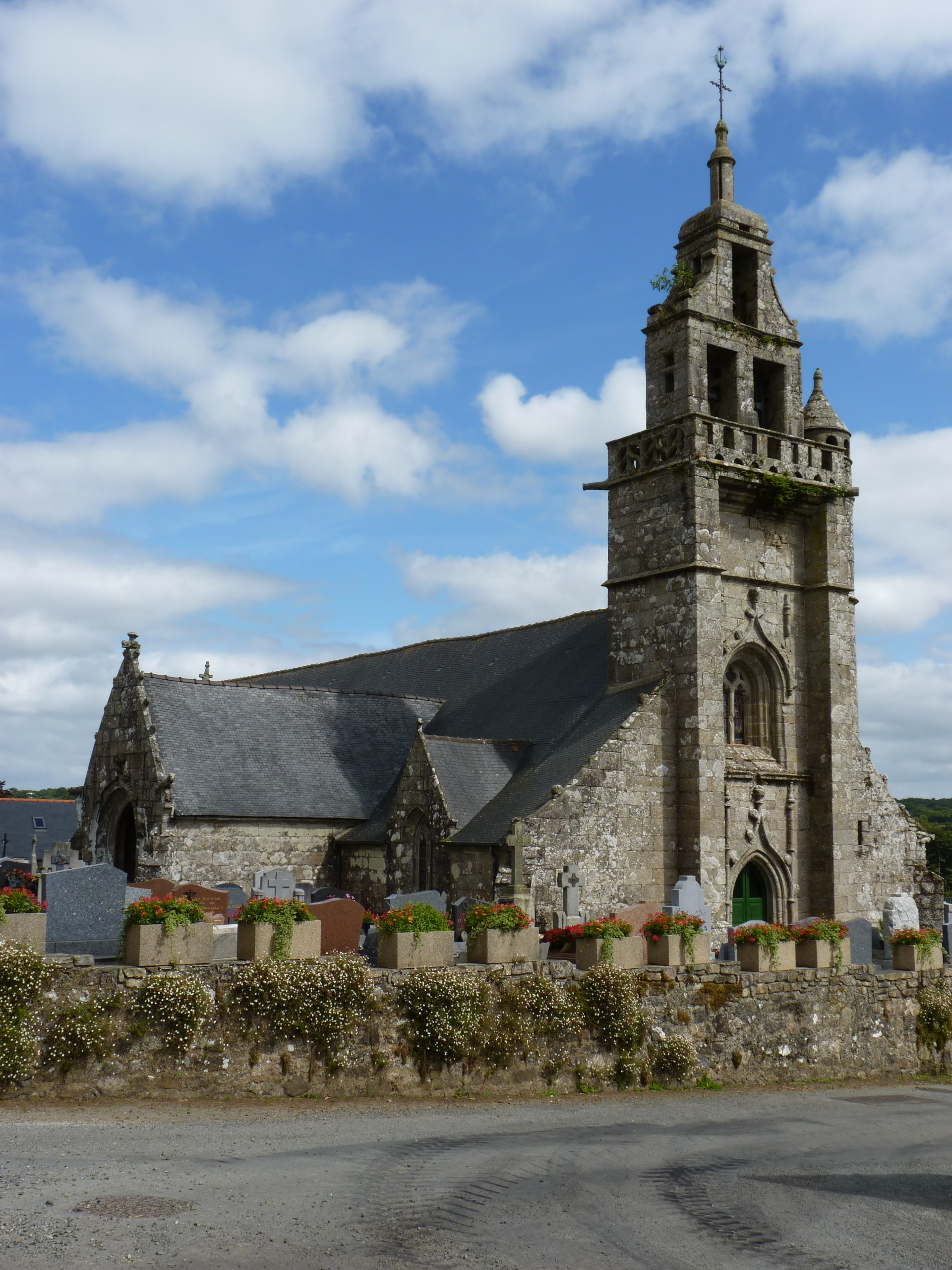
- The church of Saint-Judoce
- Location of Lohuec
- Location within France Location within Brittany
- Coordinates: 48°27′40″N 3°31′14″W
- Country: France
- Region: Brittany
- Department: Côtes-d'Armor
- Arrondissement: Guingamp
- Canton: Callac
- Intercommunality: Guingamp-Paimpol Agglomération

Government
  - Mayor (2020–2026): Claude Lozac'h
- Area^{1}: 17.18 km^{2} (6.63 sq mi)
- Highest elevation: 314 m (1,030 ft)
- Lowest elevation: 184 m (604 ft)
- Population (2023): 245
  - Density: 14.3/km^{2} (36.9/sq mi)
- Time zone: UTC+01:00 (CET)
  - Summer (DST): UTC+02:00 (CEST)
- INSEE/Postal code: 22132 /22160
- ^{1} French Land Register data, which excludes lakes, ponds, glaciers > 1 km^{2} (0.386 sq mi or 247 acres) and river estuaries.

Lohuec (French pronunciation: [lɔɥɛk]; Breton: Lohueg) is a commune in the Côtes-d'Armor department of Brittany in northwestern France.

== Population ==
Historical population
| Year | Pop. | ±% p.a. |
|---|---|---|
| 1968 | 493 | — |
| 1975 | 453 | −1.20% |
| 1982 | 372 | −2.78% |
| 1990 | 298 | −2.73% |
| 1999 | 259 | −1.55% |
| 2007 | 274 | +0.71% |
| 2012 | 271 | −0.22% |
| 2017 | 256 | −1.13% |
| 2023 | 245 | −0.73% |
Source: INSEE

Inhabitants of Lohuec are called lohuécois in French.

== See also ==
- Communes of the Côtes-d'Armor department
