= Grâces =

Grâces Gras-Gwengamp
- Commune
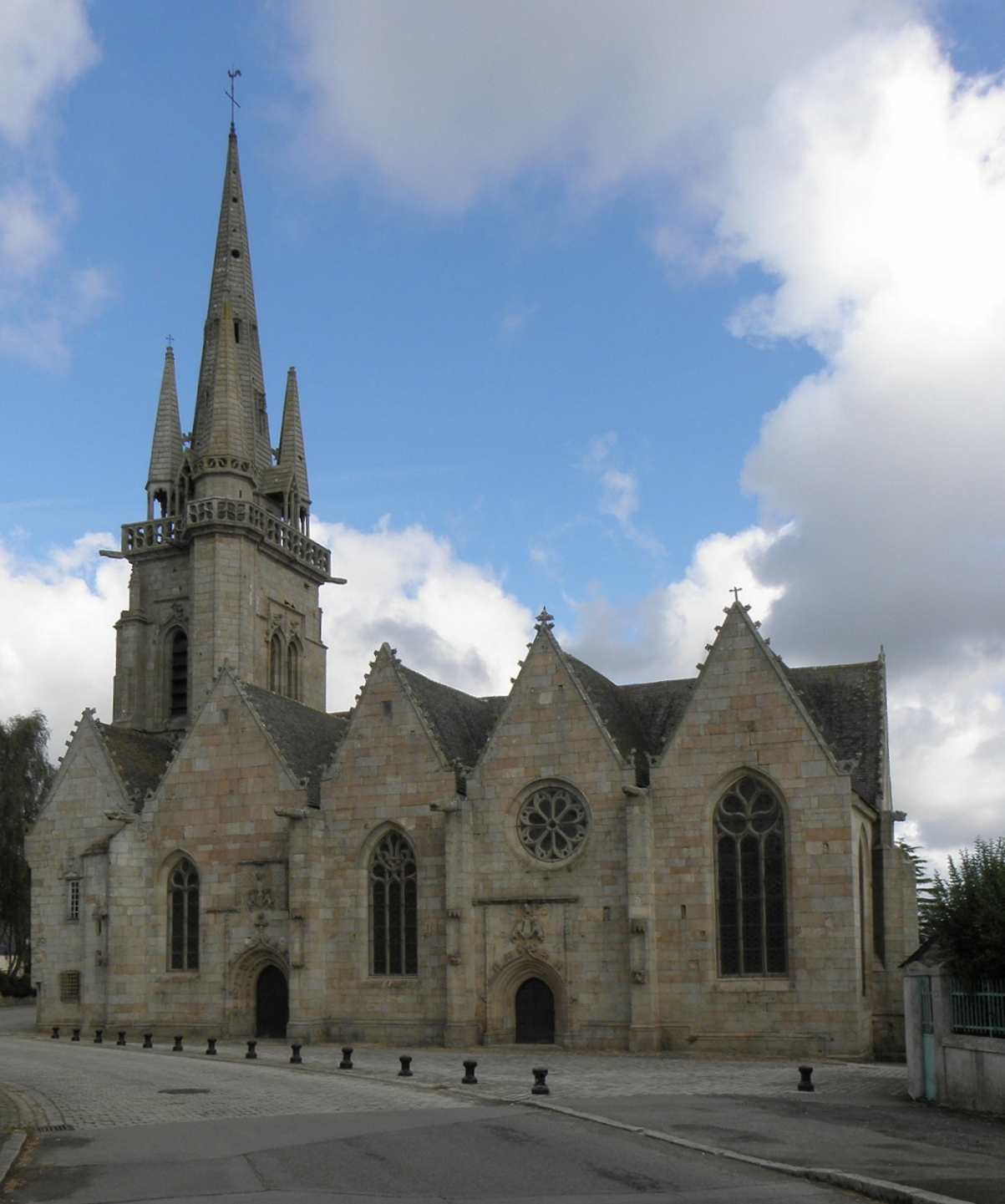
- The church of Notre-Dame in Grâces
- Location of Grâces
- Location within France Location within Brittany
- Coordinates: 48°33′24″N 3°11′01″W
- Country: France
- Region: Brittany
- Department: Côtes-d'Armor
- Arrondissement: Guingamp
- Canton: Guingamp
- Intercommunality: Guingamp-Paimpol Agglomération

Government
  - Mayor (2020–2026): Yannick Le Goff
- Area^{1}: 14.07 km^{2} (5.43 sq mi)
- Highest elevation: 188 m (617 ft)
- Lowest elevation: 67 m (220 ft)
- Population (2023): 2,601
  - Density: 184.9/km^{2} (478.8/sq mi)
- Time zone: UTC+01:00 (CET)
  - Summer (DST): UTC+02:00 (CEST)
- INSEE/Postal code: 22067 /22200
- ^{1} French Land Register data, which excludes lakes, ponds, glaciers > 1 km^{2} (0.386 sq mi or 247 acres) and river estuaries.

Grâces (French: [ɡʁɑs]; Breton: Gras-Gwengamp) is a commune in the Côtes-d'Armor department of Brittany in northwestern France.

== Population ==
Inhabitants of Grâces are called gracieux in French.

Historical population

Year	Pop.	±% p.a.
1793	1,200	—
1800	1,118	−1.01%
1806	1,019	−1.53%
1821	1,116	+0.61%
1831	1,221	+0.90%
1836	1,279	+0.93%
1841	1,299	+0.31%
1846	1,518	+3.17%
1851	1,390	−1.75%
1856	1,331	−0.86%
1861	1,371	+0.59%
1866	1,431	+0.86%
1872	1,368	−0.75%
1876	1,423	+0.99%
1881	1,446	+0.32%
1886	1,383	−0.89%
1891	1,317	−0.97%
1896	1,288	−0.44%
1901	1,297	+0.14%

Year	Pop.	±% p.a.
1906	1,319	+0.34%
1911	1,364	+0.67%
1921	1,293	−0.53%
1926	1,362	+1.05%
1931	1,440	+1.12%
1936	1,493	+0.73%
1946	1,447	−0.31%
1954	1,315	−1.19%
1962	1,300	−0.14%
1968	1,435	+1.66%
1975	1,769	+3.03%
1982	2,308	+3.87%
1990	2,481	+0.91%
1999	2,424	−0.26%
2007	2,409	−0.08%
2012	2,464	+0.45%
2017	2,528	+0.51%
2023	2,601	+0.48%

Source: EHESS and INSEE (1968-2023)

== See also ==
- Communes of the Côtes-d'Armor department
