= Saint-Adrien, Côtes-d'Armor =

Saint-Adrien Sant-Rien
- Commune
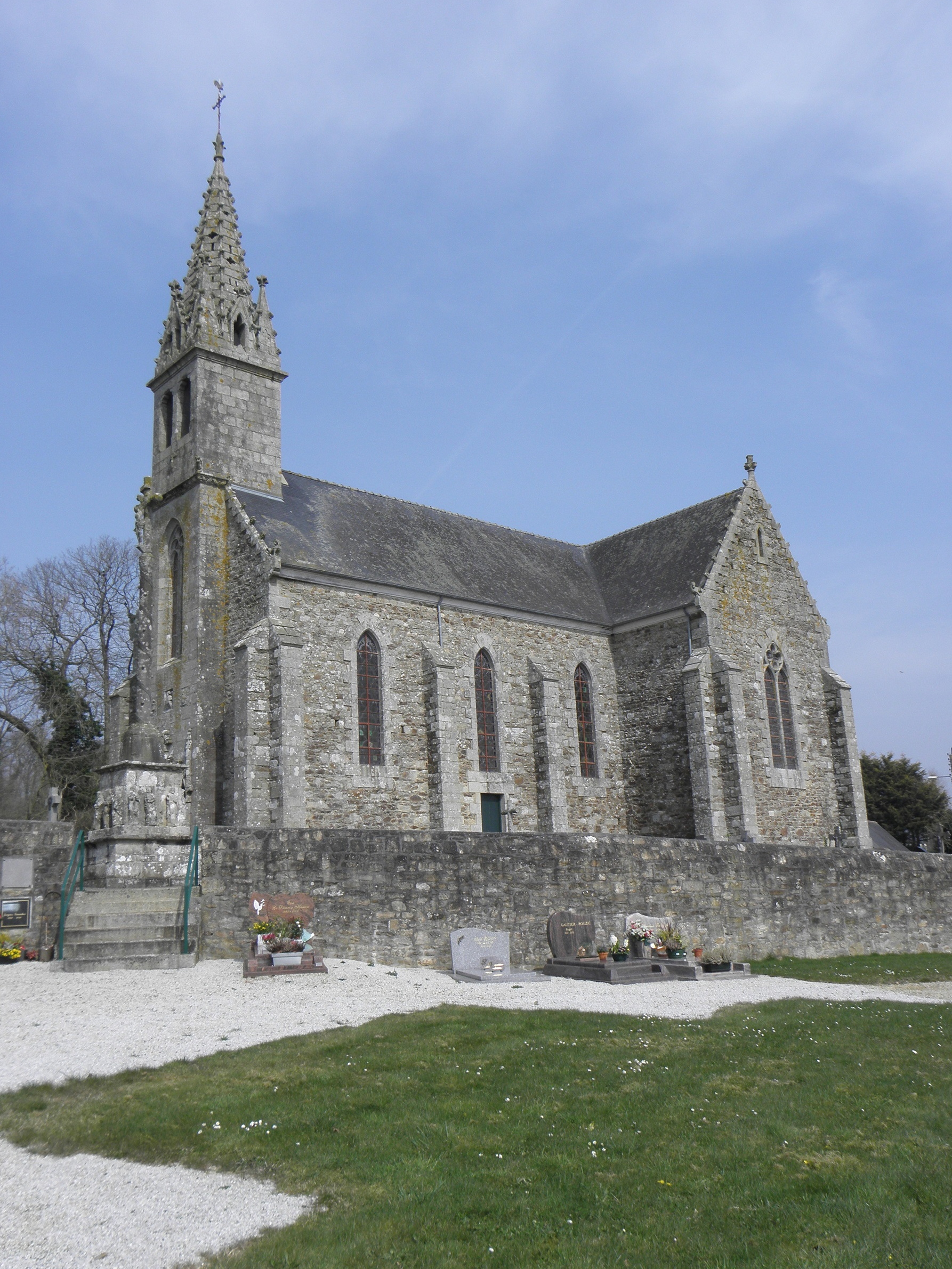
- The church in Saint-Adrien
- Location of Saint-Adrien
- Location within France Location within Brittany
- Coordinates: 48°29′23″N 3°07′45″W
- Country: France
- Region: Brittany
- Department: Côtes-d'Armor
- Arrondissement: Guingamp
- Canton: Callac
- Intercommunality: Guingamp-Paimpol Agglomération

Government
  - Mayor (2020–2026): Yves Lachater
- Area^{1}: 9.93 km^{2} (3.83 sq mi)
- Highest elevation: 211 m (692 ft)
- Lowest elevation: 84 m (276 ft)
- Population (2023): 376
  - Density: 37.9/km^{2} (98.1/sq mi)
- Time zone: UTC+01:00 (CET)
  - Summer (DST): UTC+02:00 (CEST)
- INSEE/Postal code: 22271 /22390
- ^{1} French Land Register data, which excludes lakes, ponds, glaciers > 1 km^{2} (0.386 sq mi or 247 acres) and river estuaries.

Saint-Adrien (French pronunciation: [sɛ̃.t‿adʁijɛ̃]; Breton: Sant-Rien) is a commune in the Côtes-d'Armor department of Brittany in northwestern France.

== Population ==
Historical population
Year	Pop.	±% p.a.
1968	310	—
1975	293	−0.80%
1982	307	+0.67%
1990	306	−0.04%
1999	301	−0.18%
2007	320	+0.77%
2012	358	+2.27%
2017	353	−0.28%
2023	376	+1.06%
Source: INSEE

== See also ==
- Communes of the Côtes-d'Armor department
