= Canton of Callac =

Coordinates: 48.40°N 3.43°W

The canton of Callac is an administrative division of the Côtes-d'Armor department, northwestern France. Its borders were modified at the French canton reorganisation which came into effect in March 2015. Its seat is in Callac.

It consists of the following communes:

1. Belle-Isle-en-Terre
2. Bourbriac
3. Bulat-Pestivien
4. Calanhel
5. Callac
6. Carnoët
7. La Chapelle-Neuve
8. Coadout
9. Duault
10. Gurunhuel
11. Kerien
12. Kerpert
13. Loc-Envel
14. Lohuec
15. Louargat
16. Maël-Pestivien
17. Magoar
18. Moustéru
19. Plésidy
20. Plougonver
21. Plourac'h
22. Plusquellec
23. Pont-Melvez
24. Saint-Adrien
25. Saint-Nicodème
26. Saint-Servais
27. Senven-Léhart
28. Tréglamus
