= La Chapelle-Neuve, Côtes-d'Armor =

La Chapelle-Neuve Ar Chapel-Nevez
- Commune
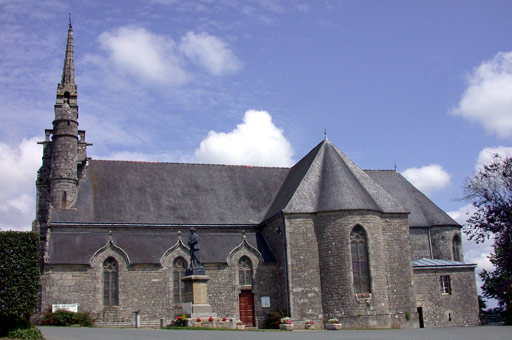
- The church of Notre-Dame-de-la-Pitié
- Location of La Chapelle-Neuve
- Location within France Location within Brittany
- Coordinates: 48°27′46″N 3°25′10″W
- Country: France
- Region: Brittany
- Department: Côtes-d'Armor
- Arrondissement: Guingamp
- Canton: Callac
- Intercommunality: Guingamp-Paimpol Agglomération

Government
  - Mayor (2020–2026): Jean-Paul Prigent
- Area^{1}: 23.78 km^{2} (9.18 sq mi)
- Highest elevation: 304 m (997 ft)
- Lowest elevation: 184 m (604 ft)
- Population (2023): 413
  - Density: 17.4/km^{2} (45.0/sq mi)
- Time zone: UTC+01:00 (CET)
  - Summer (DST): UTC+02:00 (CEST)
- INSEE/Postal code: 22037 /22160
- ^{1} French Land Register data, which excludes lakes, ponds, glaciers > 1 km^{2} (0.386 sq mi or 247 acres) and river estuaries.

La Chapelle-Neuve (French pronunciation: [la ʃapɛl nœv]; Breton: Ar Chapel-Nevez) is a commune in the Côtes-d'Armor department of Brittany in northwestern France.

== Population ==
Historical population
Year	Pop.	±% p.a.
1968	798	—
1975	677	−2.32%
1982	527	−3.51%
1990	442	−2.17%
1999	400	−1.10%
2007	424	+0.73%
2012	437	+0.61%
2017	388	−2.35%
2023	413	+1.05%
Source: INSEE

Inhabitants of La Chapelle-Neuve are called Chapelle-neuvois in French.

== Breton language ==
In 2007, 100% of primary school children attended bilingual schools.

== See also ==
- Communes of the Côtes-d'Armor department
