= Saint-Nicolas-du-Pélem =

Saint-Nicolas-du-Pélem Sant-Nikolaz-ar-Pelem
- Commune
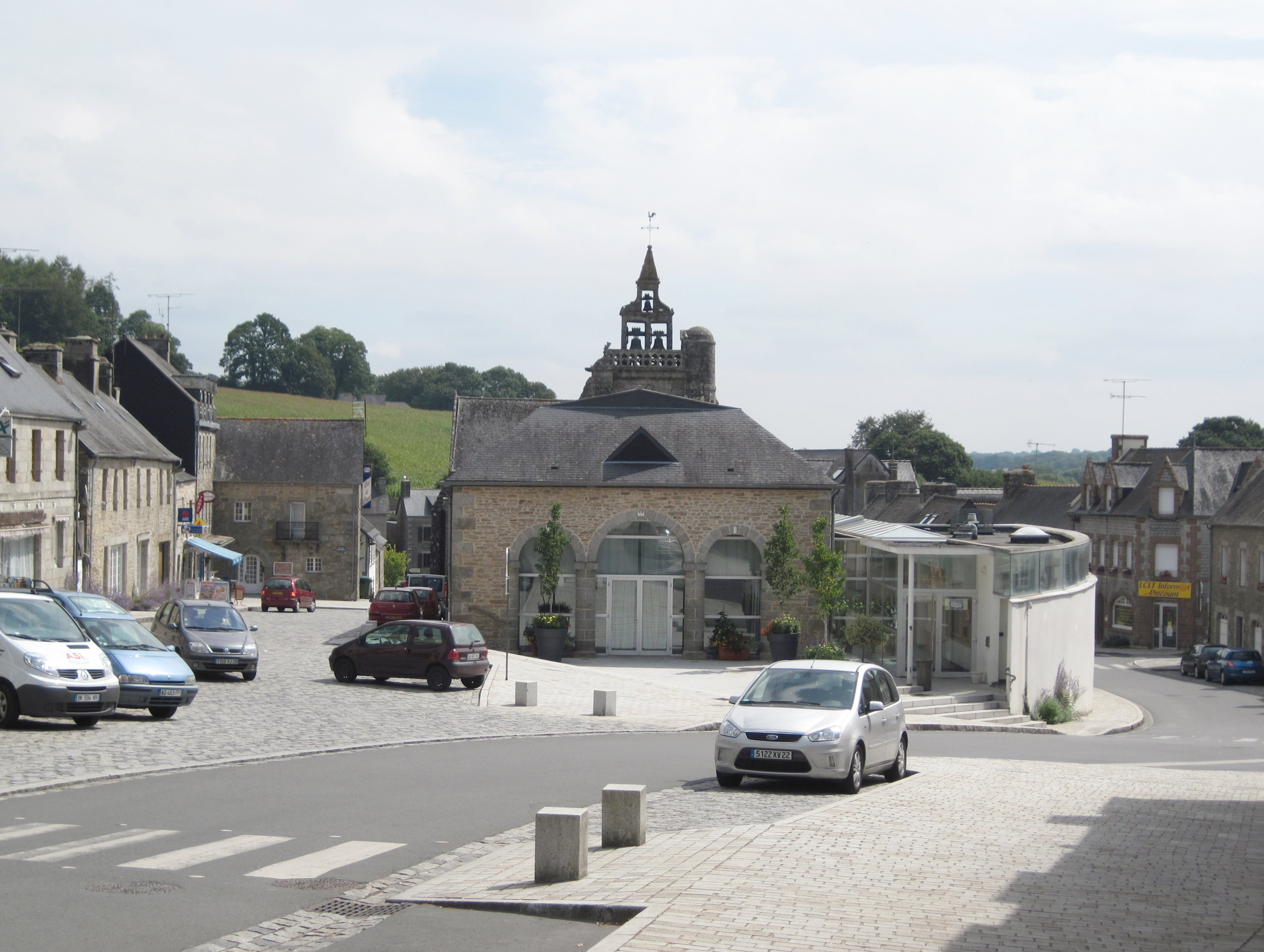
- Place Kreisker in Saint-Nicolas-du-Pélem

- Coat of arms
- Location of Saint-Nicolas-du-Pélem
- Location within France Location within Brittany
- Coordinates: 48°18′50″N 3°09′47″W
- Country: France
- Region: Brittany
- Department: Côtes-d'Armor
- Arrondissement: Guingamp
- Canton: Rostrenen
- Intercommunality: Kreiz-Breizh

Government
  - Mayor (2024–2026): Catherine Boudiaf
- Area^{1}: 41.04 km^{2} (15.85 sq mi)
- Highest elevation: 291 m (955 ft)
- Lowest elevation: 139 m (456 ft)
- Population (2023): 1,523
  - Density: 37.11/km^{2} (96.11/sq mi)
- Time zone: UTC+01:00 (CET)
  - Summer (DST): UTC+02:00 (CEST)
- INSEE/Postal code: 22321 /22480
- ^{1} French Land Register data, which excludes lakes, ponds, glaciers > 1 km^{2} (0.386 sq mi or 247 acres) and river estuaries.

Saint-Nicolas-du-Pélem (French pronunciation: [sɛ̃ nikɔla dy pelɛm]; Breton: Sant-Nikolaz-ar-Pelem) is a commune in the Côtes-d'Armor department of Brittany in northwestern France.

== Population ==
Historical population
Year	Pop.	±% p.a.
1968	2,102	—
1975	2,106	+0.03%
1982	2,023	−0.57%
1990	1,922	−0.64%
1999	1,843	−0.47%
2007	1,835	−0.05%
2012	1,725	−1.23%
2017	1,666	−0.69%
2023	1,523	−1.48%
Source: INSEE

Inhabitants of Saint-Nicolas-du-Pélem are called pélemois in French.

== History ==
=== Prehistory ===
The cairn of Croaz Dom Herry, discovered in 2005, dates to the middle of the Neolithic, but has largely been quarried for its stones, particularly during the late Middle Ages; it has 4 circular funeral chambers, each about 3 meters in diameter, at the end of a long corridor.

=== Roman period ===
The town that later became Saint-Nicolas-du-Pélem was built 500 meters from the Roman road linking Vorgium (capital of the Osismii) with Corseul and Aleth (capital of the Coriosolites).

A large plateau surrounded by an artificial moat near Pélinec pond is sometimes considered to be the remains of a pre-Roman fortification of the Gauls, or of a Roman camp, and sometimes as the remains of a medieval camp (Frotier de la Messelière reports having seen foundations for a circular stone tower).

=== Second World War ===
A monument to the deceased of Saint-Nicolas-du-Pélem lists 32 individuals who perished during World War II.

=== Le maquis Tito ===
During the German occupation, the a group of maquis of the FTP operating in the Côtes-du-Nord, was organized during the spring of 1943 in the rectangular area of Trémargat, Lanrivain, Peumerit-Quintin, and Saint-Nicolas-du-Pélem, led by Louis Pichouron, whose nom de guerre was "Commandant Alain". In January 1944 they took the name of the "Tito Company", after Josip Broz Tito, leader of the communist resistance movement in Yugoslavia, with a team in Saint-Nicolas-du-Pélem led by Théodore Le Nénan.

On 11 November 1943 Théodore Le Nénan killed a member of the Feldgendarmerie in Plouaret; on 23 December Georges Ollitrault attacked a German officer at Loudéac. An attack on the town hall of Saint-Nicodème resulted in the arrest of many members of the group at Trébrivan, and four were shot on 6 May 1944 at Ploufragan.

== See also ==
- Communes of the Côtes-d'Armor department
- Guy Éder de La Fontenelle
