= Paule =

Commune in Côtes-d'Armor department, Brittany, France

Paule Paoul
- Commune
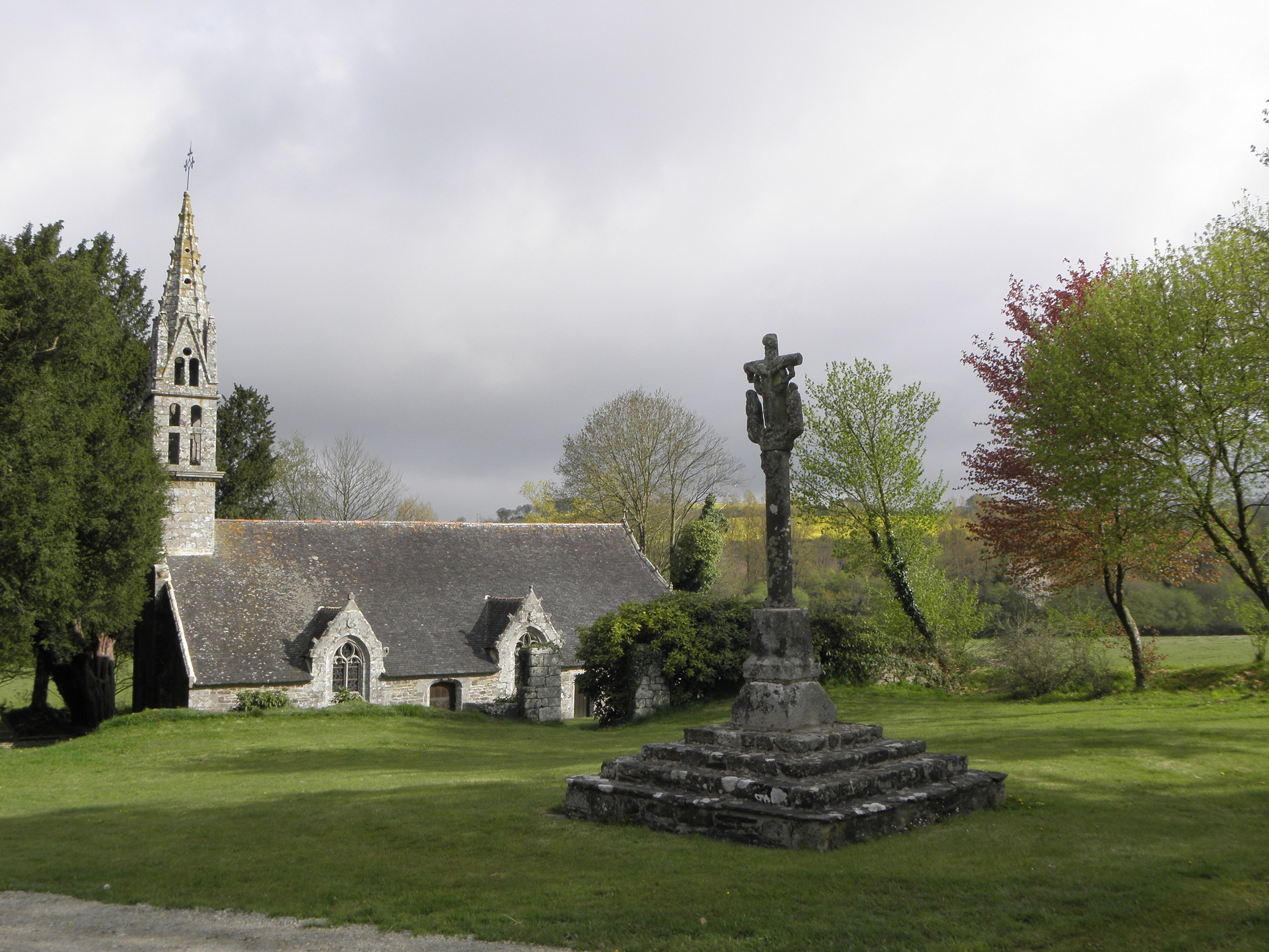
- The chapel of Lansalaün
- Location of Paule
- Location within France Location within Brittany
- Coordinates: 48°14′13″N 3°26′37″W
- Country: France
- Region: Brittany
- Department: Côtes-d'Armor
- Arrondissement: Guingamp
- Canton: Rostrenen
- Intercommunality: Kreiz-Breizh

Government
  - Mayor (2023–2026): Christel Guillerm
- Area^{1}: 37.56 km^{2} (14.50 sq mi)
- Highest elevation: 298 m (978 ft)
- Lowest elevation: 108 m (354 ft)
- Population (2023): 671
  - Density: 17.9/km^{2} (46.3/sq mi)
- Time zone: UTC+01:00 (CET)
  - Summer (DST): UTC+02:00 (CEST)
- INSEE/Postal code: 22163 /22340
- ^{1} French Land Register data, which excludes lakes, ponds, glaciers > 1 km^{2} (0.386 sq mi or 247 acres) and river estuaries.

Paule (French pronunciation: [pol]; Breton: Paoul) is a commune in the Côtes-d'Armor department in Brittany in northwestern France.

== Population ==
Historical population
Year	Pop.	±% p.a.
1968	962	—
1975	811	−2.41%
1982	716	−1.76%
1990	627	−1.65%
1999	652	+0.44%
2007	733	+1.47%
2012	724	−0.25%
2017	707	−0.47%
2023	671	−0.87%
Source: INSEE

Inhabitants of Paule are called paulois in French.

== Geography ==
Paule is located on the northern slope of the Montagnes Noires (french, Black Mountains), 55 km (34 mi) northeast of Quimper. Historically, the village belongs to Cornouaille. Paule is border by Le Moustoir and Maël-Carhaix to the north, by Glomel to the east, by Langonnet to the south and by Plévin to the west. From the hamlet of Bellevue, it is possible to enjoy a nice view on the plain toward the north.

== Map ==
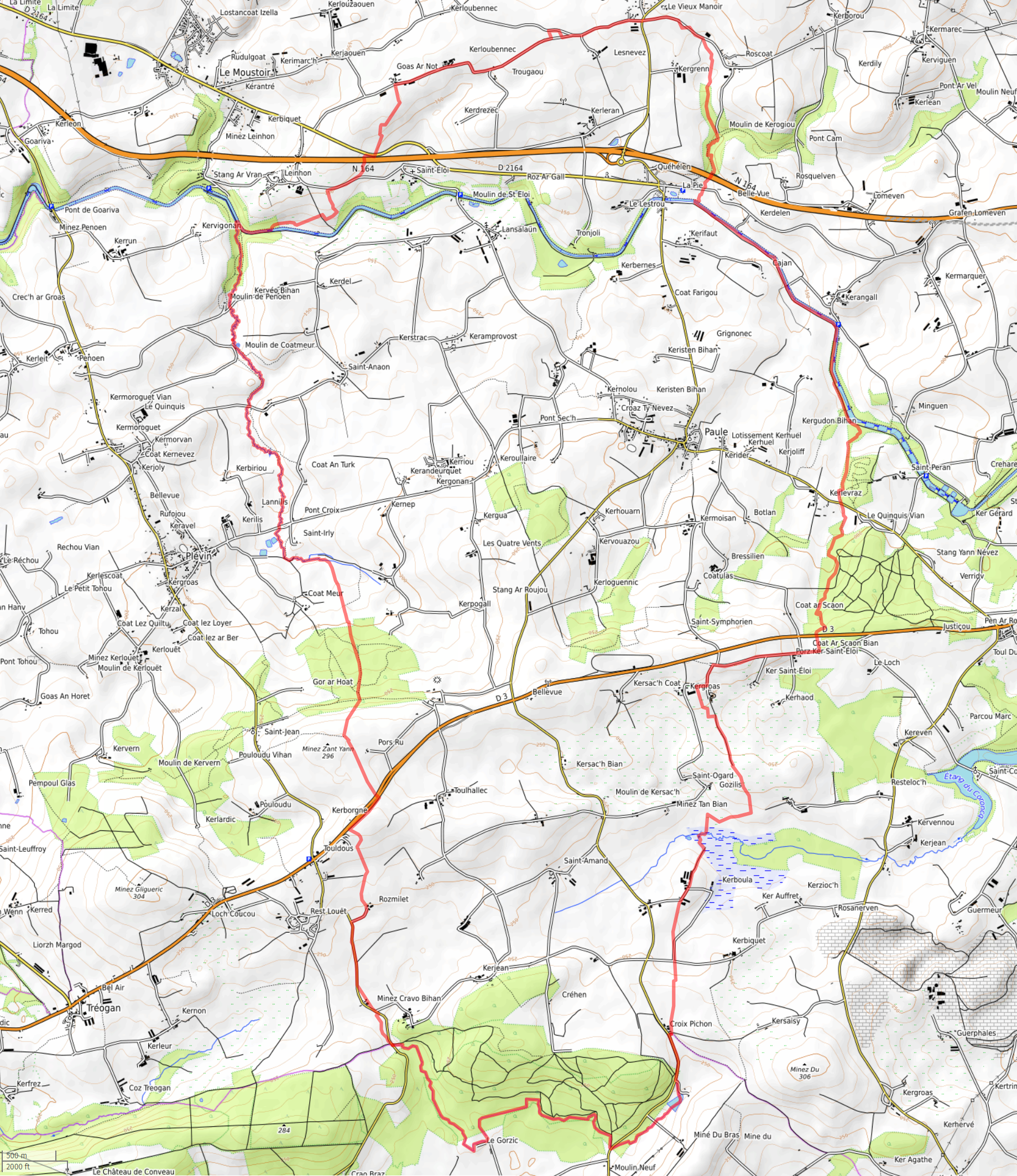
Topographic map.

== Prehistory ==
The fortified habitat of Paule, a protohistoric Celtic fortress commonly called the fortress of Paule, dates from the 5th century BC. to the 1st century AD. J.-C., on the territory of the Osismes.

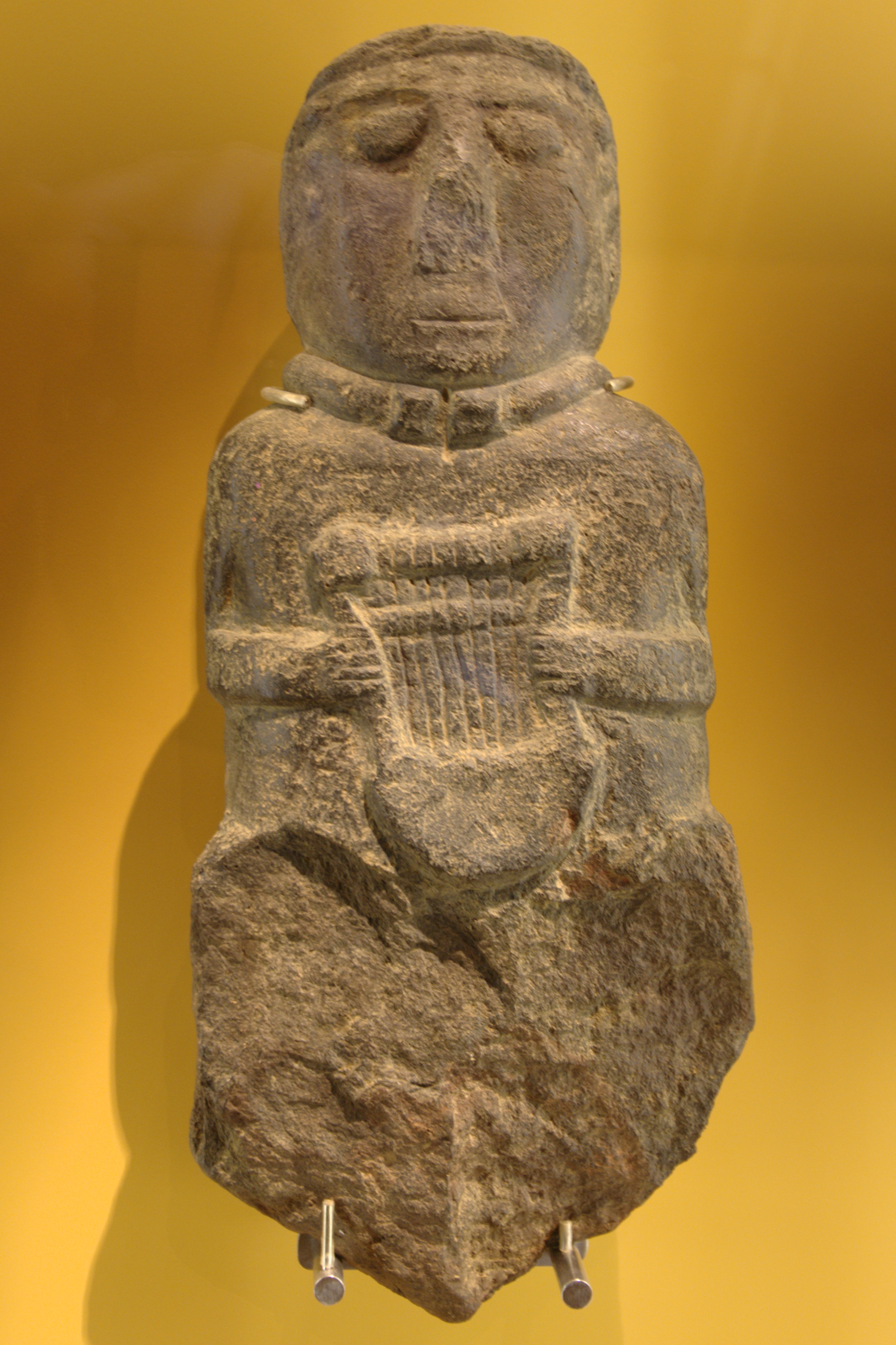
Buste-socle of a bard discovered during the excavations of the Paule fortress.

== See also ==
- Communes of the Côtes-d'Armor department
