= Perret =

Perret is a surname. Notable people with the surname include:

- Auguste Perret (1874–1954), French architect
- Catherine Perret, French philosopher and curator
- Craig Perret (born 1951), American jockey
- Henri Perret (born 1962) later known as Kelly Nickels, bass guitarist
- Henrik Perret (born 1946), Finnish Lutheran pastor
- Jacques Perret, 16th century French architect and mathematician
- Jacques Perret (writer) (1901–1992), French writer
- Jean-Marc Perret (born 1975), English-born actor
- Léonce Perret (1880–1935), French film actor, director and producer
- Michèle Perret, French medieval linguistics professor and novelist
- Pierre Perret (born 1934), French singer
- Theo Perret (1915–2008), Swiss racing cyclist

== See also ==
- Perrett, a surname
- Perret, Côtes-d'Armor, a commune in France
