= Plévin =

Plévin Plevin
- Commune
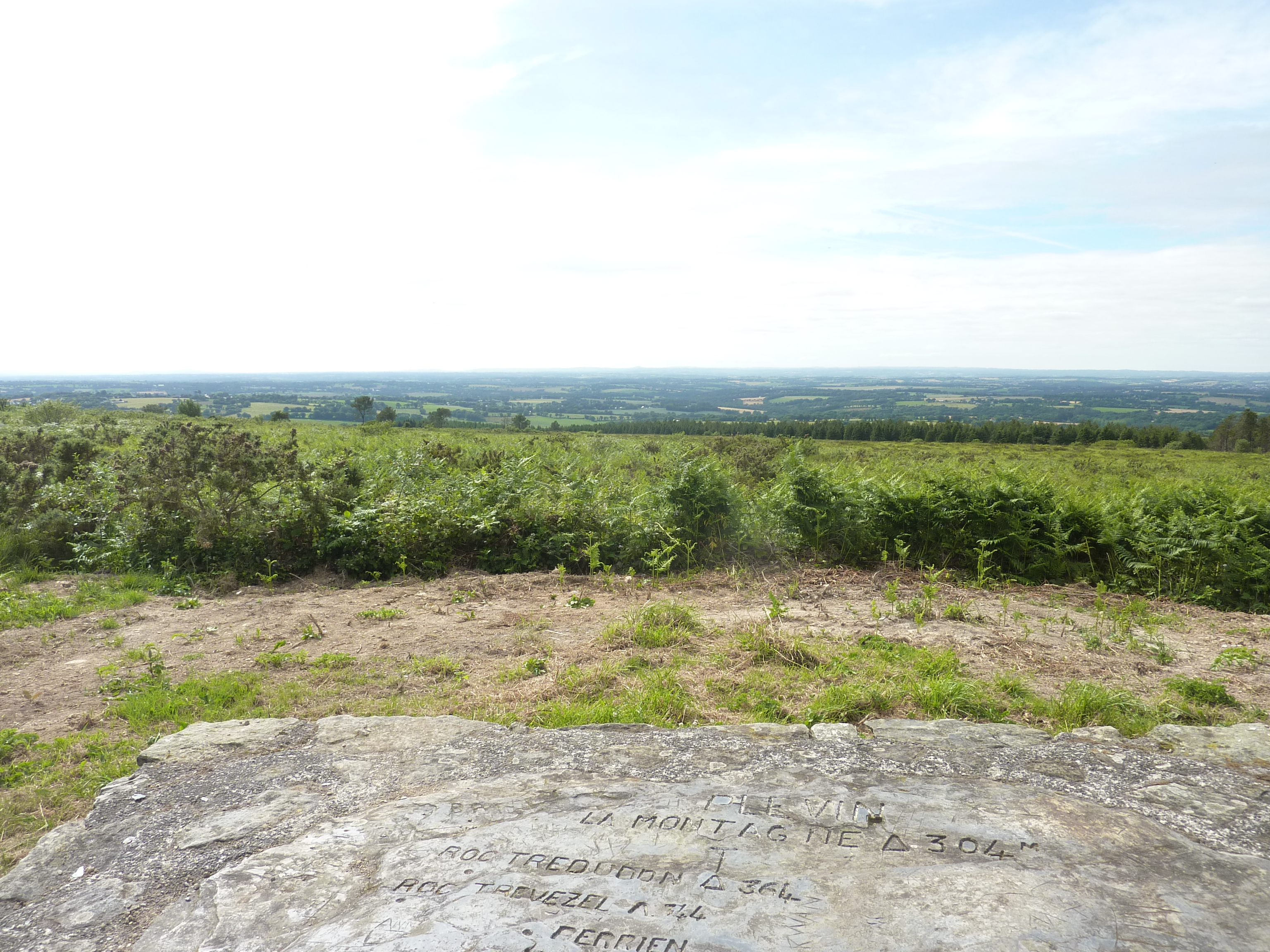
- Looking north towards the Monts d'Arrée from the summit of the Ménez Gliguéric, in Plévin
- Location of Plévin
- Location within France Location within Brittany
- Coordinates: 48°13′38″N 3°30′14″W
- Country: France
- Region: Brittany
- Department: Côtes-d'Armor
- Arrondissement: Guingamp
- Canton: Rostrenen
- Intercommunality: Poher Communauté

Government
  - Mayor (2020–2026): Dominique Cogen
- Area^{1}: 27.36 km^{2} (10.56 sq mi)
- Highest elevation: 302 m (991 ft)
- Lowest elevation: 90 m (300 ft)
- Population (2023): 754
  - Density: 27.6/km^{2} (71.4/sq mi)
- Time zone: UTC+01:00 (CET)
  - Summer (DST): UTC+02:00 (CEST)
- INSEE/Postal code: 22202 /22340
- ^{1} French Land Register data, which excludes lakes, ponds, glaciers > 1 km^{2} (0.386 sq mi or 247 acres) and river estuaries.

Plévin (French pronunciation: [plevɛ̃]; Breton: Plevin) is a commune in the Côtes-d'Armor department of Brittany in northwestern France.

== Population ==
Historical population
Year	Pop.	±% p.a.
1968	1,015	—
1975	883	−1.97%
1982	774	−1.86%
1990	781	+0.11%
1999	774	−0.10%
2007	783	+0.14%
2012	789	+0.15%
2017	751	−0.98%
2023	754	+0.07%
Source: INSEE

Inhabitants of Plévin are called plévinois in French.

== Geography ==
Plévin is located on the northern slope of the Montagnes Noires (french, Black Mountains), 51 km (32 mi) northeast of Quimper, 53 km (33 mi) north of Lorient and 64 km (40 mi) southwest of Saint-Brieuc. Two of the highsest peaks of the Montagnes Noires, the Minez Gligueric and the Minez Zant Yann, stand in the south of the commune. Historically, the village belongs to Cornouaille. Plévin is border by Tréogan and Motreff to the west, by Carhaix-Plouguer and Le Moustoir to the north, by Paule to the east and by Langonnet to the south.

== Map ==
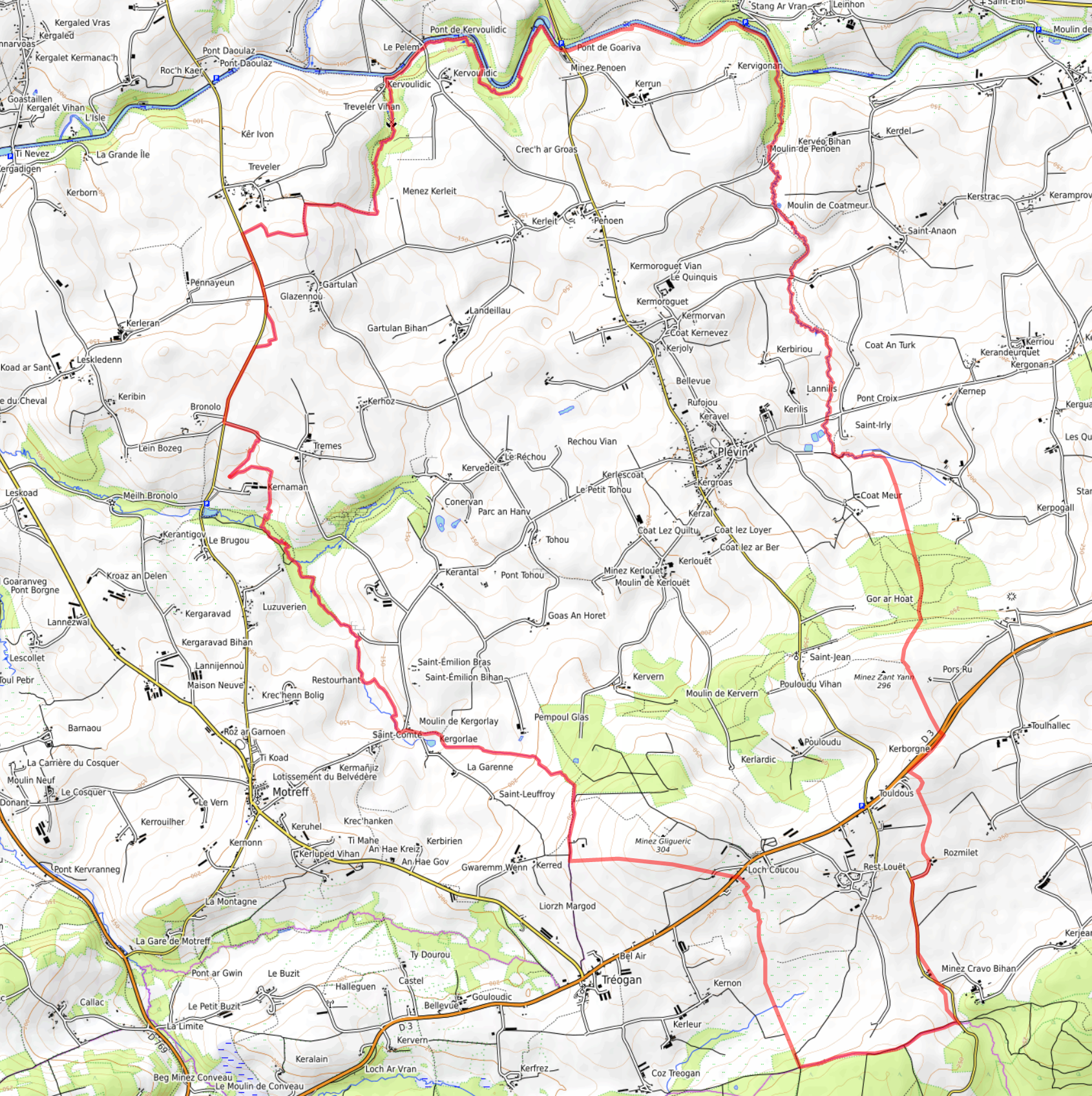
Topographic map.

== History ==
Reverend Father Julien Maunoir died in Plévin in January 28, 1693.

== See also ==
- Communes of the Côtes-d'Armor department
- Julian Maunoir, orthographer of the Breton language and "Apostle of Brittany"
