= Trébrivan =

Trébrivan Trabrivan
- Commune
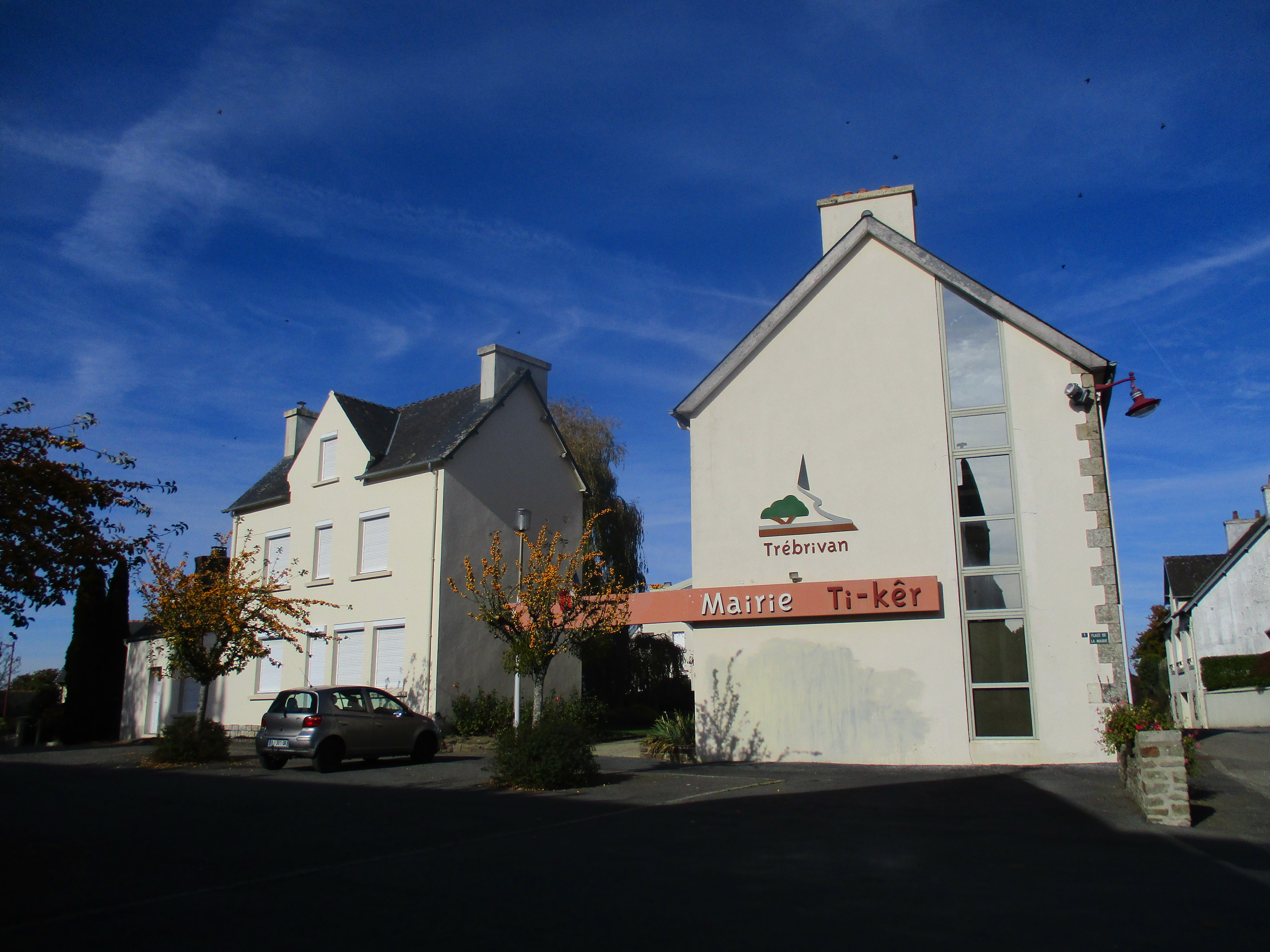
- The town hall of Trébrivan

- Coat of arms
- Location of Trébrivan
- Location within France Location within Brittany
- Coordinates: 48°18′35″N 3°28′27″W
- Country: France
- Region: Brittany
- Department: Côtes-d'Armor
- Arrondissement: Guingamp
- Canton: Rostrenen
- Intercommunality: Kreiz-Breizh

Government
  - Mayor (2020–2026): Fabrice Even
- Area^{1}: 22.96 km^{2} (8.86 sq mi)
- Highest elevation: 192 m (630 ft)
- Lowest elevation: 87 m (285 ft)
- Population (2023): 761
  - Density: 33.1/km^{2} (85.8/sq mi)
- Time zone: UTC+01:00 (CET)
  - Summer (DST): UTC+02:00 (CEST)
- INSEE/Postal code: 22344 /22340
- ^{1} French Land Register data, which excludes lakes, ponds, glaciers > 1 km^{2} (0.386 sq mi or 247 acres) and river estuaries.

Trébrivan (French pronunciation: [tʁebʁivɑ̃]; Breton: Trabrivan) is a commune in the Côtes-d'Armor department of Brittany in northwestern France.

== Population ==
Historical population
Year	Pop.	±% p.a.
1968	827	—
1975	745	−1.48%
1982	705	−0.79%
1990	651	−0.99%
1999	664	+0.22%
2007	693	+0.54%
2012	698	+0.14%
2017	741	+1.20%
2023	761	+0.44%
Source: INSEE

Inhabitants of Trébrivan are called trébrivanais in French.

== Transportation ==
There is an infrequent bus service between Trebrivan and Carhaix-Plouguer to the west which runs to Maël-Carhaix and Rostrenen to the east. Apart from that, the village is not accessible by public transport.

== People ==
Trebrivan is the home village of Breton musician Soig Siberil.

== See also ==
- Communes of the Côtes-d'Armor department
