= Saint-Gelven =

Saint-Gelven Sant-Jelven
- Part of Bon Repos sur Blavet
- Location of Saint-Gelven
- Location within France Location within Brittany
- Coordinates: 48°13′38″N 3°05′46″W
- Country: France
- Region: Brittany
- Department: Côtes-d'Armor
- Arrondissement: Guingamp
- Canton: Rostrenen
- Commune: Bon Repos sur Blavet
- Area^{1}: 17.48 km^{2} (6.75 sq mi)
- Highest elevation: 281 m (922 ft)
- Lowest elevation: 120 m (390 ft)
- Population (2022): 317
  - Density: 18.1/km^{2} (47.0/sq mi)
- Time zone: UTC+01:00 (CET)
  - Summer (DST): UTC+02:00 (CEST)
- Postal code: 22570
- ^{1} French Land Register data, which excludes lakes, ponds, glaciers > 1 km^{2} (0.386 sq mi or 247 acres) and river estuaries.

Saint-Gelven (French pronunciation: [sɛ̃ ʒɛlvɛ̃]; Breton: Sant-Jelven) is a former commune in the Côtes-d'Armor department of Brittany in northwestern France. On 1 January 2017, it was merged into the new commune Bon Repos sur Blavet.

== Population ==
Inhabitants of Saint-Gelven are called saintgelvenois in French.

== See also ==
- Communes of the Côtes-d'Armor department
