= Saint-Gilles-Pligeaux =

Saint-Gilles-Pligeaux Sant-Jili-Plijo
- Commune
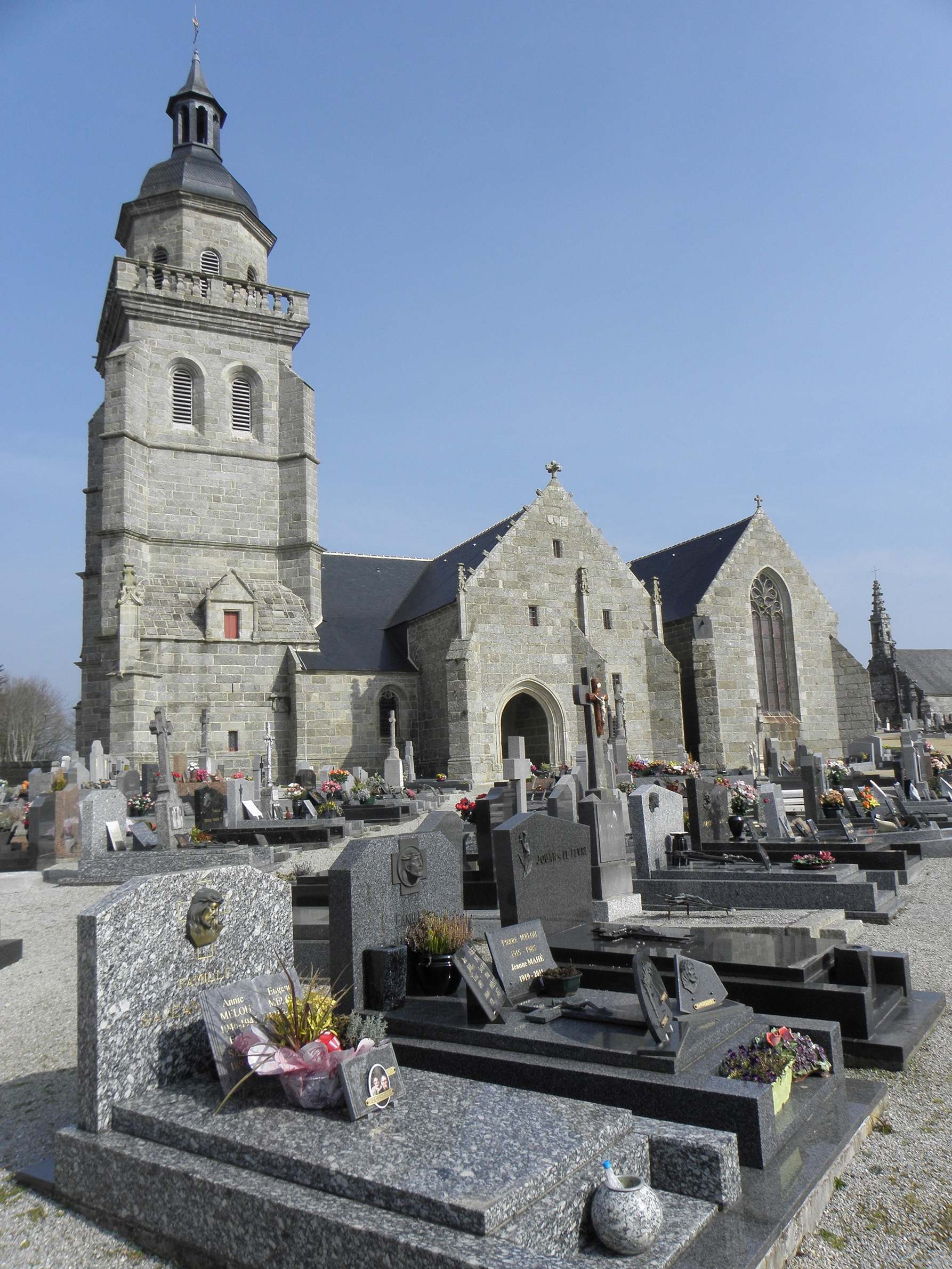
- The church of Saint-Gilles, in Saint-Gilles-Pligeaux

- Coat of arms
- Location of Saint-Gilles-Pligeaux
- Location within France Location within Brittany
- Coordinates: 48°22′51″N 3°05′36″W
- Country: France
- Region: Brittany
- Department: Côtes-d'Armor
- Arrondissement: Guingamp
- Canton: Rostrenen
- Intercommunality: Kreiz-Breizh

Government
  - Mayor (2020–2026): Gildas Guyader
- Area^{1}: 19.45 km^{2} (7.51 sq mi)
- Highest elevation: 302 m (991 ft)
- Lowest elevation: 183 m (600 ft)
- Population (2023): 307
  - Density: 15.8/km^{2} (40.9/sq mi)
- Time zone: UTC+01:00 (CET)
  - Summer (DST): UTC+02:00 (CEST)
- INSEE/Postal code: 22294 /22480
- ^{1} French Land Register data, which excludes lakes, ponds, glaciers > 1 km^{2} (0.386 sq mi or 247 acres) and river estuaries.

Saint-Gilles-Pligeaux (French pronunciation: [sɛ̃ ʒil pliʒo]; Breton: Sant-Jili-Plijo) is a commune in the Côtes-d'Armor department of Brittany in northwestern France.

== Population ==
Historical population
| Year | Pop. | ±% p.a. |
|---|---|---|
| 1968 | 593 | — |
| 1975 | 491 | −2.66% |
| 1982 | 398 | −2.96% |
| 1990 | 352 | −1.52% |
| 1999 | 299 | −1.80% |
| 2007 | 293 | −0.25% |
| 2012 | 274 | −1.33% |
| 2017 | 295 | +1.49% |
| 2023 | 307 | +0.67% |
Source: INSEE

Inhabitants of Saint-Gilles-Pligeaux are called saint-gillois in French.

== See also ==
- Communes of the Côtes-d'Armor department
