= Julian Maunoir =

French Jesuit priest (1606–1683)

Blessed Julian Maunoir
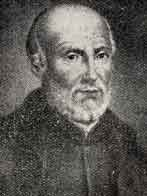
- Bl. Julien Maunoir
- Born: 1 October 1606; Saint Georges-de-Reintembault
- Died: 28 January 1683 (aged 76); Plevin, Cornouaille
- Venerated in: Catholic Church
- Beatified: 20 May 1951 by Pope Pius XII
- Feast: 28 January

Julien Maunoir (1 October 1606 – 28 January 1683) (also Julian; Breton: Juluan Maner), was a French-born Jesuit priest known as the "Apostle of Brittany". He was beatified in 1951 by Pope Pius XII and is commemorated by the Catholic Church on 29 January and 2 July.

== Life ==
Maunoir was born 1 October 1606 at Saint-Georges-de-Reintembault near Rennes. At the age of fourteen, he entered the Jesuit college in Rennes. Julian entered the Society of Jesus in Paris at nineteen with the Canadian mission in mind.

He studied philosophy at La Fleche and in 1630 was assigned to the college at Saint-Ives at Quimper, Brittany, where he taught Latin and Greek. A classmate of Isaac Jogues and Gabriel Lalemant, he aspired to become a missionary to the peoples of Canada. During his period of priestly formation with the Society of Jesus, he studied the Breton language in order to teach the faith to the Breton peasants. He worked hard and within two months he was sufficiently fluent to be able to preach in Breton. Maunoir is considered a noted orthographer of the Breton language, having completed a Breton grammar. He continued to preach in the hamlets of Brittany until he went to Tours to begin his theological studies prior to ordination.

Maunoir continued his theological studies in Bourges under Louis Lallemant, followed by a year in Rouen, some missionary work in Normandy, and a year of teaching literature at the College of Nevers.

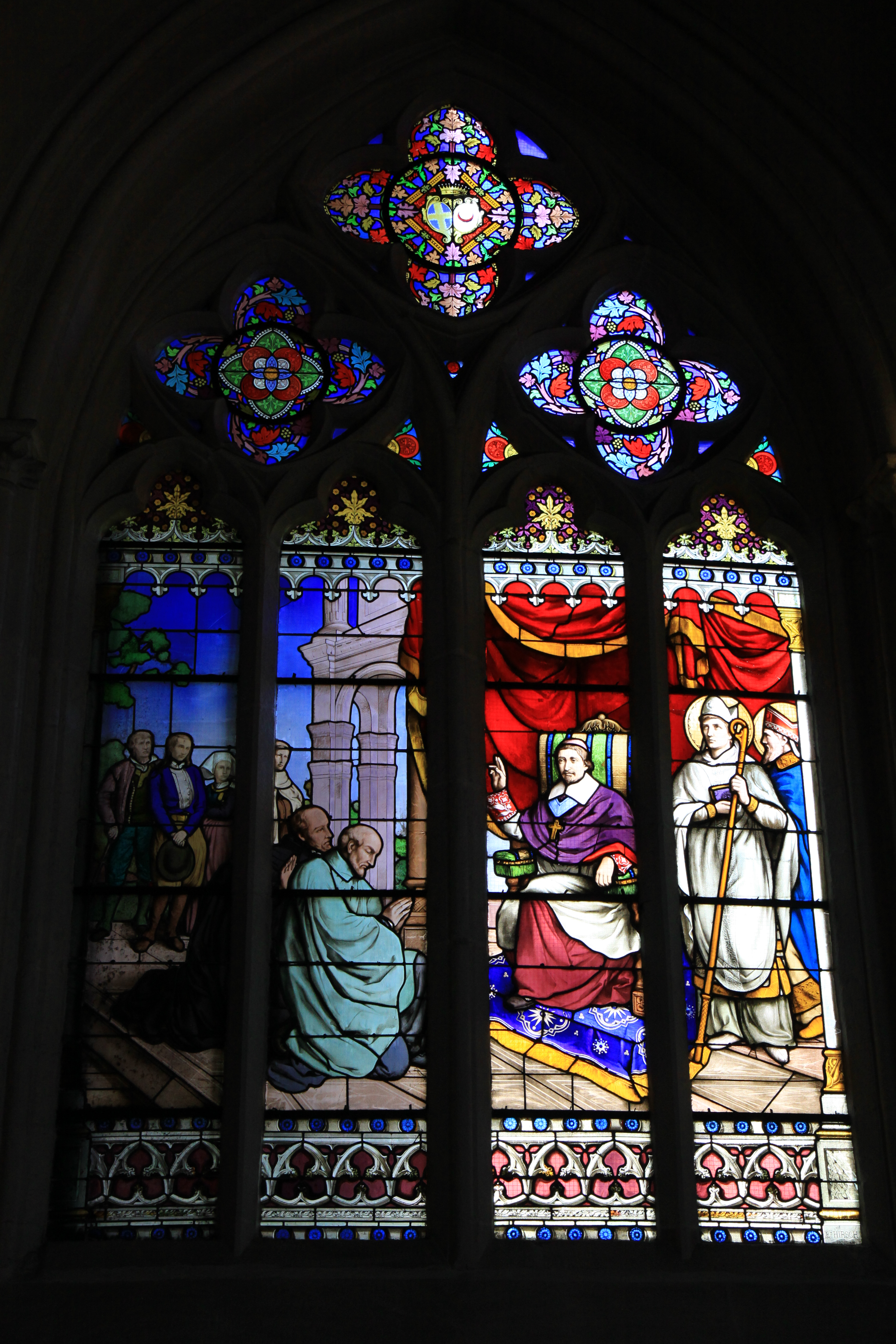
Un vitrail de la cathédral Saint-Corentin à Quimper - 015

He was ordained in 1637 and returned to Brittany in 1640 and was assigned again to Quimper, succeeding Venerable Dom Michael le Nobletz. A window in Quimper Cathedral is entitled Prėsentation de Julien Maunoir à Monseigneur du Louët par Michel Le Nobletz. It depicts Michel Le Nobletz presenting Julien Maunoir to Renė du Louët, Bishop of Cornouaille. Erected as a tribute to Bishop du Louët, it recognizes the importance of Le Nobletz and Maunoir as Breton missionaries.

Maunoir was found to be uniquely suited for the difficult task of evangelizing the impoverished people of Brittany. Together with his companion, Pierre Bernard, Maunoir worked among the poor, the peasants and fishermen. Maunoir worked as a missionary to the Breton people for 43 years, and managed to give a Christian meaning to what had become pious customs.

Maunoir, along with Bernard, congregated from 5,000 to 10,000 people in each mission. According to some contemporaries, parishioners had to reserve an appointment for the confessional ten days in advance. Maunoir used to preach (which included dramatic performances) about the pains and torments of hell, after which the new converts fell into a panic and came to confess their sins en masse. In 1675, after the repression of the Revolt of the papier timbré by the Royal troops, Maunier proudly stated: "Fear of God was as effective as the threat of weapons".

By 1683, he had formed almost 1,000 Breton missionaries, who carried on the pastoral works that he had begun. Julien Maunoir died in Plévin, Brittany, on 28 January 1683, and was buried in the parish church grounds at the insistence of his people.

He was beatified by Pope Pius XII in 1951.

== See also ==
- History of Brittany
