= Bon Repos sur Blavet =

- Commune
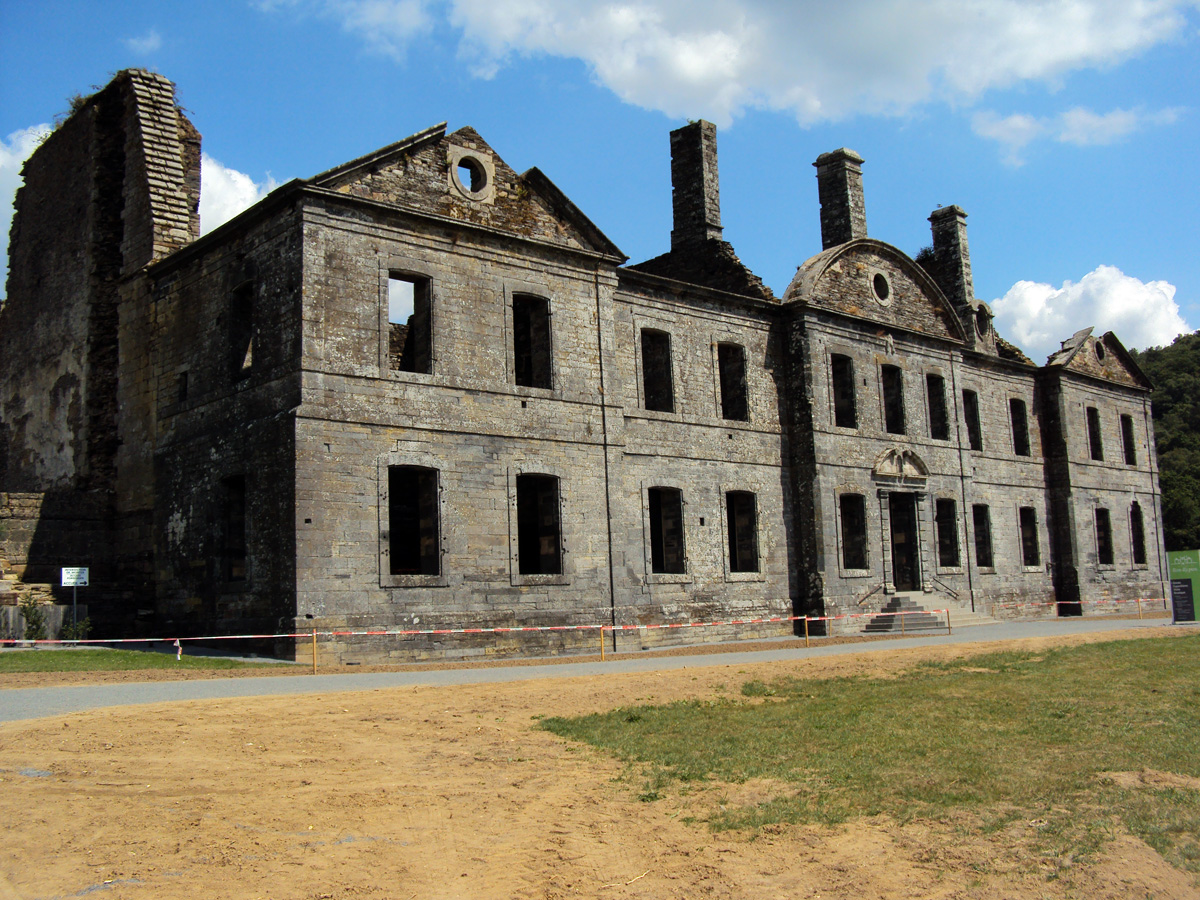
- The abbey of Notre-Dame of Bon-Repos, in Saint-Gelven
- Location of Bon Repos sur Blavet
- Location within France Location within Brittany
- Coordinates: 48°14′31″N 3°07′19″W
- Country: France
- Region: Brittany
- Department: Côtes-d'Armor
- Arrondissement: Guingamp
- Canton: Rostrenen
- Intercommunality: Kreiz-Breizh

Government
  - Mayor (2020–2026): Raoul Riou
- Area^{1}: 53.91 km^{2} (20.81 sq mi)
- Population (2023): 1,248
  - Density: 23.15/km^{2} (59.96/sq mi)
- Time zone: UTC+01:00 (CET)
  - Summer (DST): UTC+02:00 (CEST)
- INSEE/Postal code: 22107 /22570
- ^{1} French Land Register data, which excludes lakes, ponds, glaciers > 1 km^{2} (0.386 sq mi or 247 acres) and river estuaries.

Bon Repos sur Blavet (French pronunciation: [bɔ̃ ʁəpo syʁ blavɛ], literally Bon Repos on Blavet; Breton: Berrepoz-ar-Blavezh) is a commune in the department of Côtes-d'Armor, western France. The municipality was established on 1 January 2017 by merger of the former communes of Laniscat (the seat), Perret and Saint-Gelven.

== See also ==
- Communes of the Côtes-d'Armor department
