= Perrett =

Perrett is a surname. Notable people with the surname include:

- Amanda Perrett, English race horse trainer
- David Perrett (born 1954), British psychologist
- Fred Perrett (1891–1918), Wales international rugby player
- George Perrett (1915–1952), English footballer
- Graham Perrett (born 1966), Australian politician
- Jeff Perrett (born 1984), Canadian football player
- John Perrett (c. 1866–1943), better known as Potato Creek Johnny, American gold prospector
- Lloyd Perrett (born 1994), New Zealand-Australian rugby league player
- Lucy Perrett (born 1960), British sprint canoer
- Mark Perrett (born 1973), English rugby league player
- Peter Perrett (born 1952), English singer-songwriter
- Robert Perrett (1919–1994), English footballer
- Russell Perrett (born 1973), English footballer
- Sam Perrett (born 1985), New Zealand rugby league player
- Susie Perrett (born 1967), British sprint canoer

== See also ==
- 100596 Perrett, asteroid
- Perret (disambiguation)
