= Plounévez-Quintin =

Plounévez-Quintin Plounevez-Kintin
- Commune
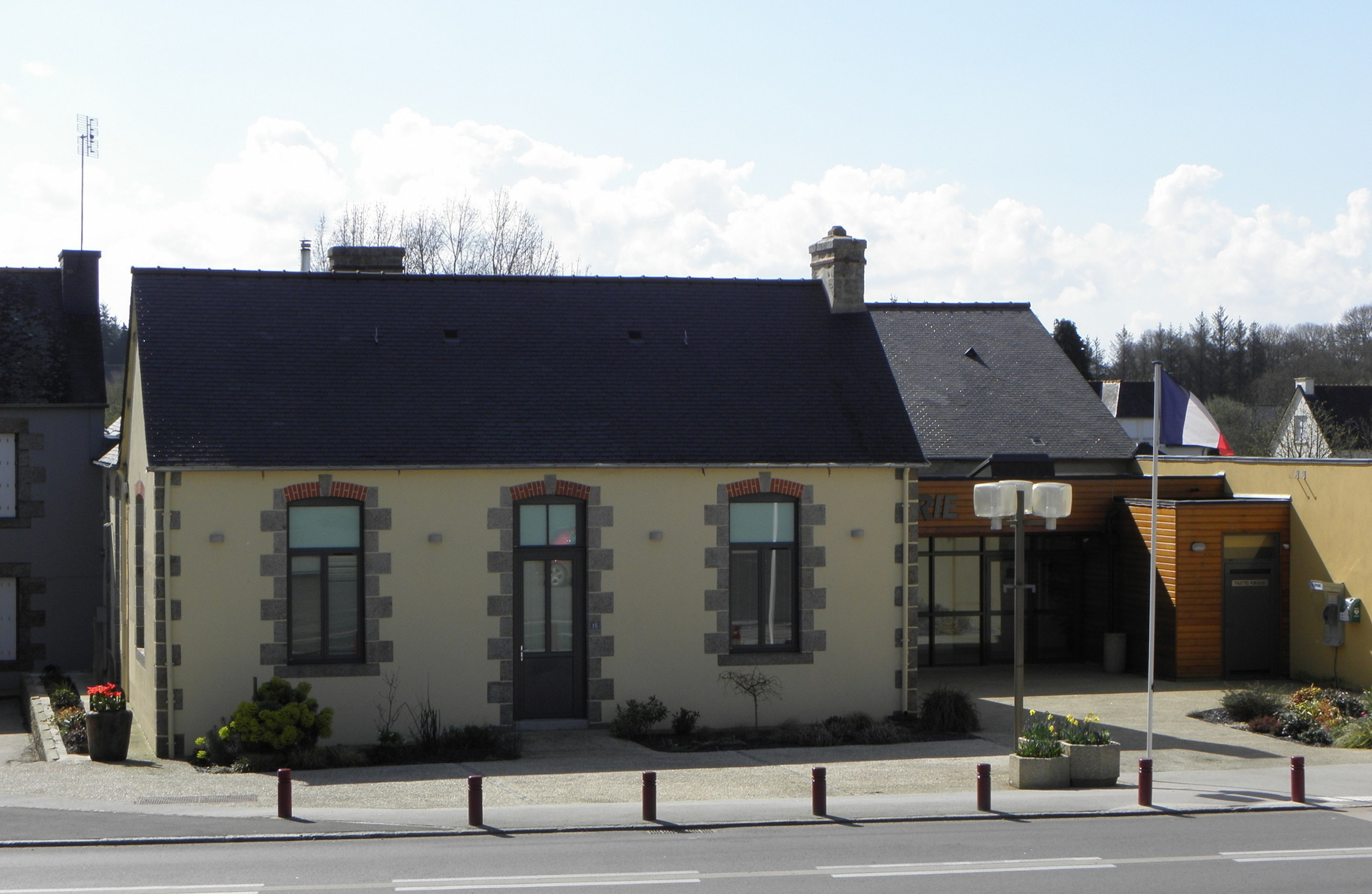
- The town hall in Plounévez-Quintin
- Location of Plounévez-Quintin
- Location within France Location within Brittany
- Coordinates: 48°17′27″N 3°13′49″W
- Country: France
- Region: Brittany
- Department: Côtes-d'Armor
- Arrondissement: Guingamp
- Canton: Rostrenen
- Intercommunality: Kreiz-Breizh

Government
  - Mayor (2020–2026): Rémy Le Vot
- Area^{1}: 42.89 km^{2} (16.56 sq mi)
- Highest elevation: 290 m (950 ft)
- Lowest elevation: 135 m (443 ft)
- Population (2023): 1,064
  - Density: 24.81/km^{2} (64.25/sq mi)
- Time zone: UTC+01:00 (CET)
  - Summer (DST): UTC+02:00 (CEST)
- INSEE/Postal code: 22229 /22110
- ^{1} French Land Register data, which excludes lakes, ponds, glaciers > 1 km^{2} (0.386 sq mi or 247 acres) and river estuaries.

Plounévez-Quintin (French pronunciation: [pluneve kɛ̃tɛ̃]; Breton: Plounevez-Kintin) is a commune in the Côtes-d'Armor department of Brittany in northwestern France.

== Population ==
Inhabitants of Plounévez-Quintin are called plounévéziens in French.

== See also ==
- Communes of the Côtes-d'Armor department
