= Perret, Côtes-d'Armor =

Perret Perred
- Part of Bon Repos sur Blavet
- Location of Perret
- Location within France Location within Brittany
- Coordinates: 48°10′38″N 3°09′30″W
- Country: France
- Region: Brittany
- Department: Côtes-d'Armor
- Arrondissement: Guingamp
- Canton: Rostrenen
- Commune: Bon Repos sur Blavet
- Area^{1}: 12.22 km^{2} (4.72 sq mi)
- Highest elevation: 286 m (938 ft)
- Lowest elevation: 122 m (400 ft)
- Population (2023): 146
  - Density: 11.9/km^{2} (30.9/sq mi)
- Time zone: UTC+01:00 (CET)
  - Summer (DST): UTC+02:00 (CEST)
- Postal code: 22570
- ^{1} French Land Register data, which excludes lakes, ponds, glaciers > 1 km^{2} (0.386 sq mi or 247 acres) and river estuaries.

Perret (French pronunciation: [pɛʁɛt]; Breton: Perred) is a former commune in the Côtes-d'Armor department of Brittany which lies in northwestern France. On 1 January 2017, it was merged into the new commune Bon Repos sur Blavet.

== See also ==
- Communes of the Côtes-d'Armor department
