= Canihuel =

Canihuel Kanuhel
- Commune
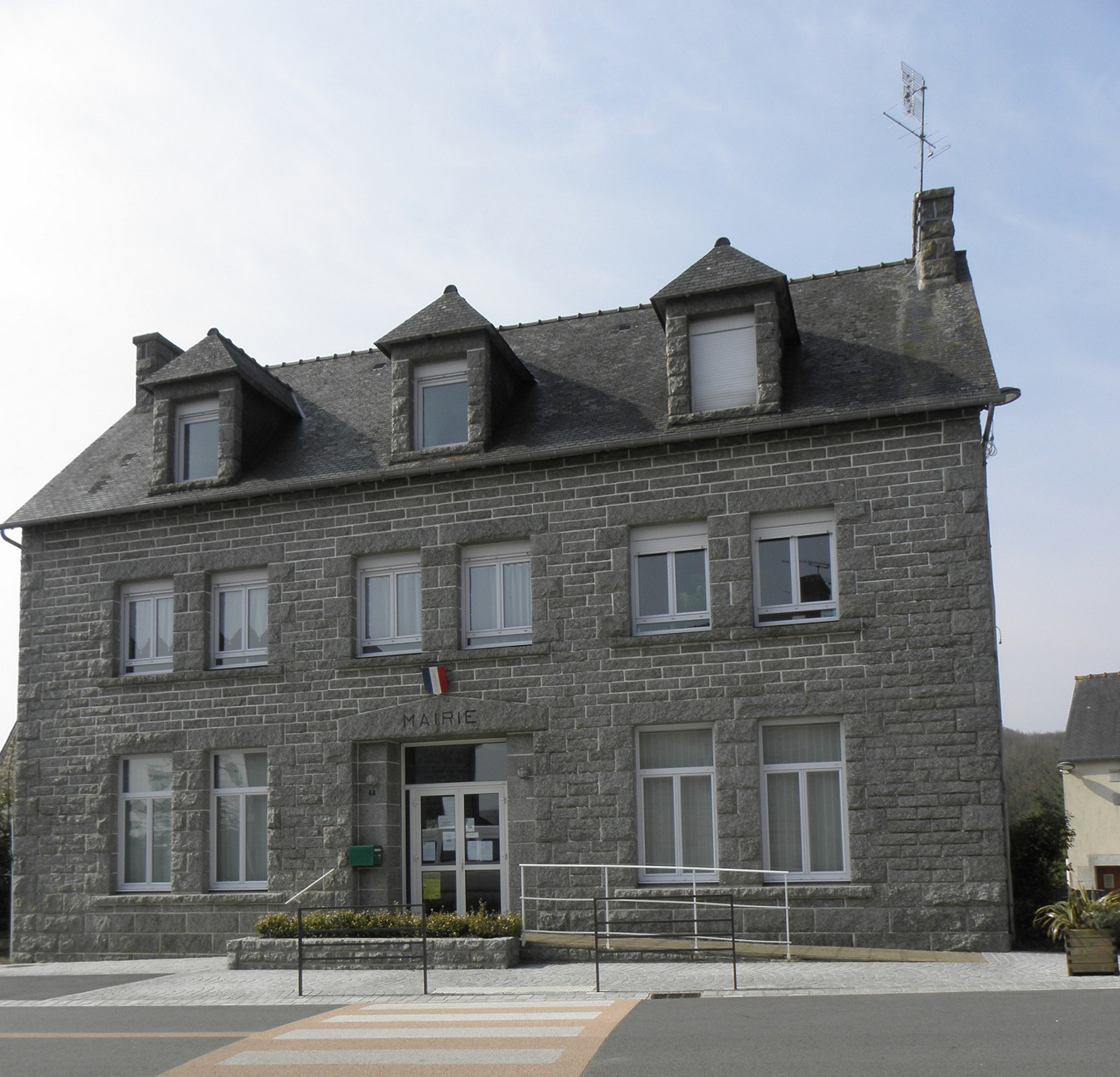
- Town hall
- Location of Canihuel
- Location within France Location within Brittany
- Coordinates: 48°20′20″N 3°06′15″W
- Country: France
- Region: Brittany
- Department: Côtes-d'Armor
- Arrondissement: Guingamp
- Canton: Rostrenen
- Intercommunality: Kreiz-Breizh

Government
  - Mayor (2020–2026): Franck Le Meaux
- Area^{1}: 32.14 km^{2} (12.41 sq mi)
- Highest elevation: 296 m (971 ft)
- Lowest elevation: 149 m (489 ft)
- Population (2023): 350
  - Density: 11/km^{2} (28/sq mi)
- Time zone: UTC+01:00 (CET)
  - Summer (DST): UTC+02:00 (CEST)
- INSEE/Postal code: 22029 /22480
- ^{1} French Land Register data, which excludes lakes, ponds, glaciers > 1 km^{2} (0.386 sq mi or 247 acres) and river estuaries.

Canihuel (French pronunciation: [kani.ɥɛl]; Breton: Kanuhel) is a commune in the Côtes-d'Armor department of Brittany in northwestern France.

== Population ==
Historical population
| Year | Pop. | ±% p.a. |
|---|---|---|
| 1968 | 653 | — |
| 1975 | 558 | −2.22% |
| 1982 | 459 | −2.75% |
| 1990 | 422 | −1.05% |
| 1999 | 409 | −0.35% |
| 2007 | 376 | −1.05% |
| 2012 | 372 | −0.21% |
| 2017 | 355 | −0.93% |
| 2023 | 350 | −0.24% |
Source: INSEE

Inhabitants of Canihuel are called Canihuelois or Canihelois in French.

== See also ==
- Communes of the Côtes-d'Armor department
