= Saint-Igeaux =

Saint-Igeaux Sant-Ijo
- Commune
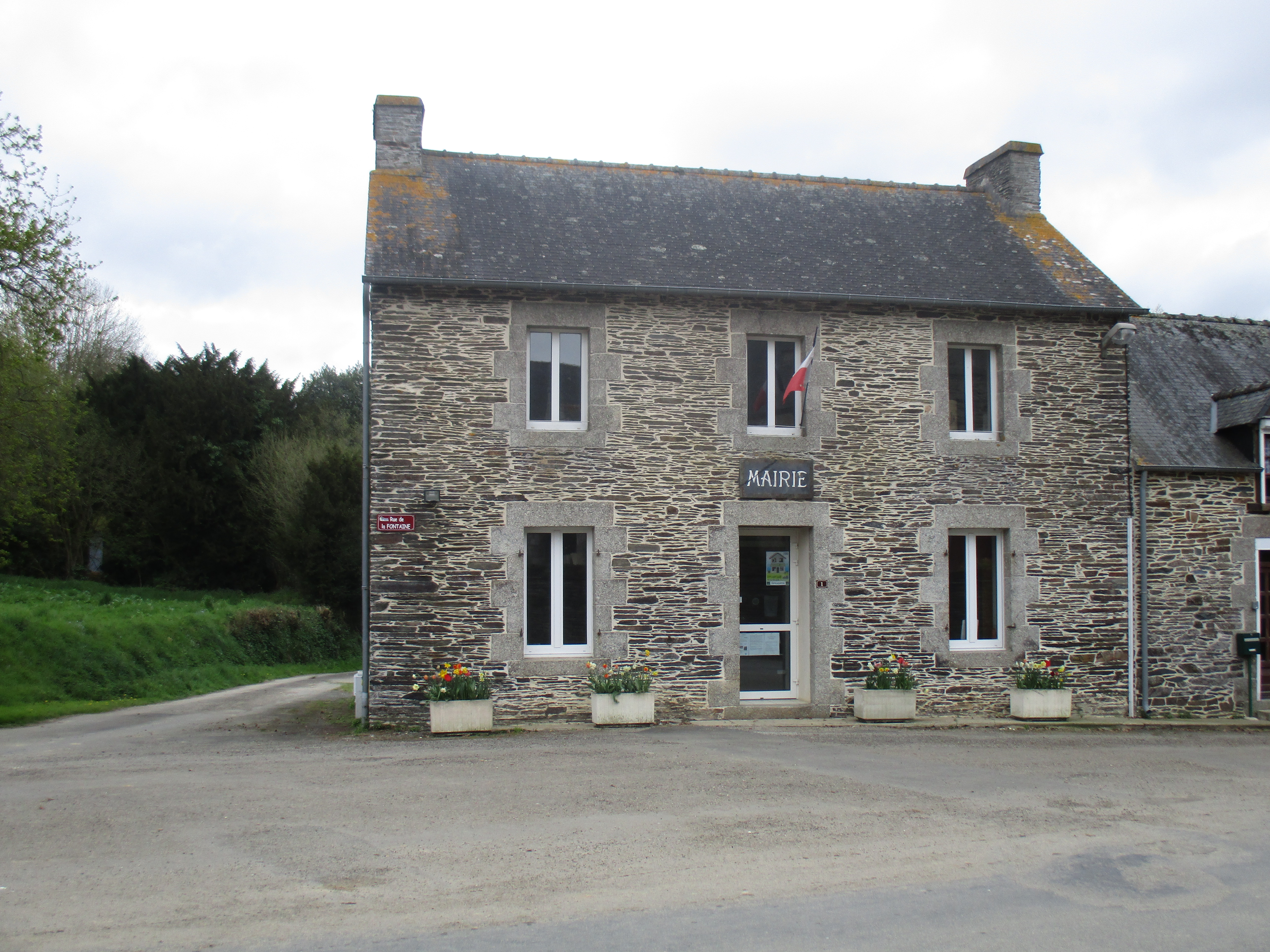
- Town hall
- Location of Saint-Igeaux
- Location within France Location within Brittany
- Coordinates: 48°16′22″N 3°06′15″W
- Country: France
- Region: Brittany
- Department: Côtes-d'Armor
- Arrondissement: Guingamp
- Canton: Rostrenen
- Intercommunality: Kreiz-Breizh

Government
  - Mayor (2020–2026): Claude Bernard
- Area^{1}: 12.91 km^{2} (4.98 sq mi)
- Highest elevation: 221 m (725 ft)
- Lowest elevation: 137 m (449 ft)
- Population (2023): 126
  - Density: 9.76/km^{2} (25.3/sq mi)
- Time zone: UTC+01:00 (CET)
  - Summer (DST): UTC+02:00 (CEST)
- INSEE/Postal code: 22334 /22570
- ^{1} French Land Register data, which excludes lakes, ponds, glaciers > 1 km^{2} (0.386 sq mi or 247 acres) and river estuaries.

Saint-Igeaux (French pronunciation: [sɛ̃.t‿iʒo]; Breton: Sant-Ijo) is a commune in the Côtes-d'Armor département of Brittany in northwestern France.

== Population ==
Historical population
Year	Pop.	±% p.a.
1968	360	—
1975	352	−0.32%
1982	234	−5.67%
1990	153	−5.17%
1999	151	−0.15%
2007	170	+1.49%
2012	137	−4.22%
2017	135	−0.29%
2023	126	−1.14%
Source: INSEE

== See also ==
- Communes of the Côtes-d'Armor department
