= Saint-Connan =

Saint-Connan Sant-Konan
- Commune
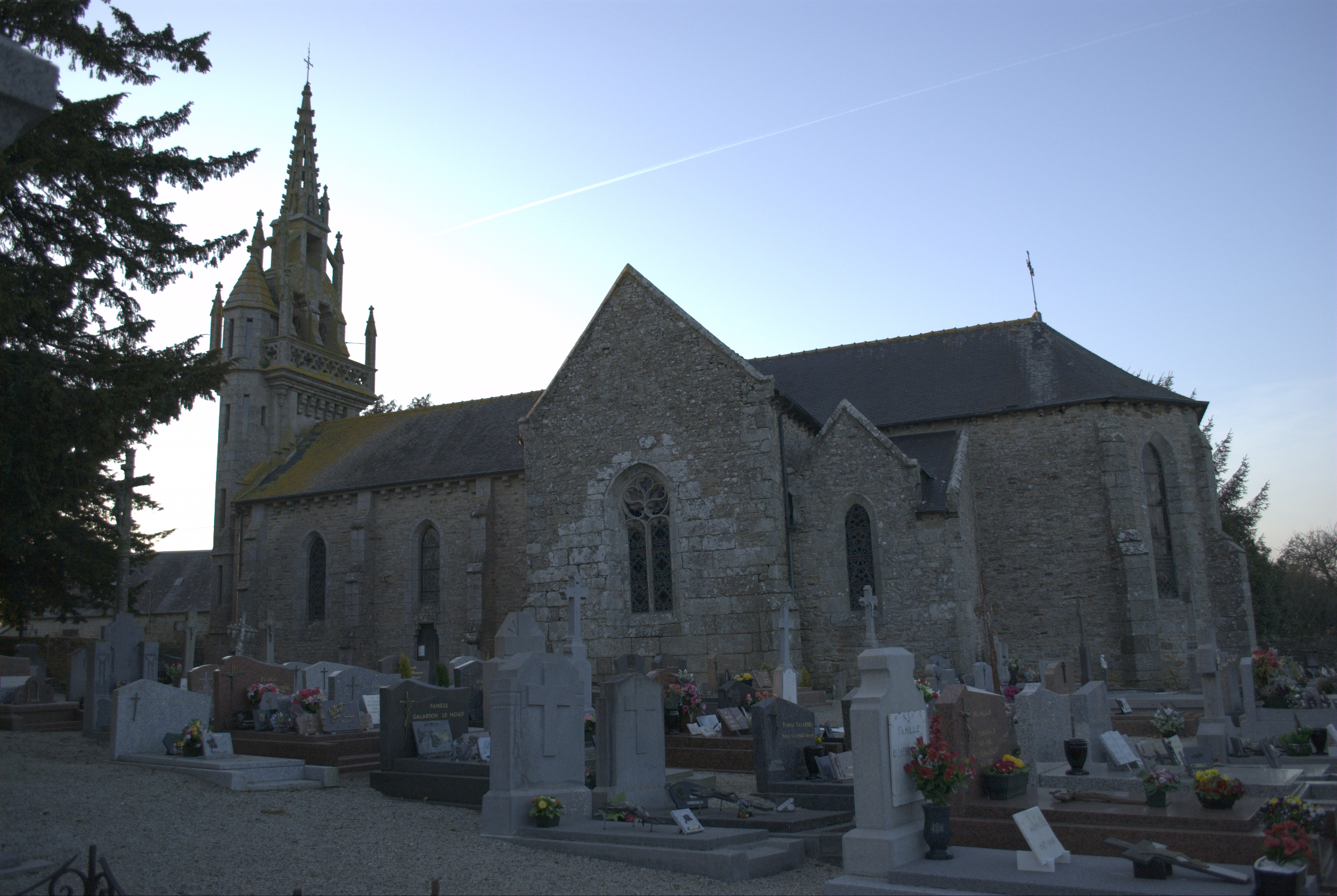
- The church in Saint-Connan
- Location of Saint-Connan
- Location within France Location within Brittany
- Coordinates: 48°25′08″N 3°03′46″W
- Country: France
- Region: Brittany
- Department: Côtes-d'Armor
- Arrondissement: Guingamp
- Canton: Rostrenen
- Intercommunality: Kreiz-Breizh

Government
  - Mayor (2020–2026): Jean-Yves Philippe
- Area^{1}: 13.54 km^{2} (5.23 sq mi)
- Highest elevation: 282 m (925 ft)
- Lowest elevation: 154 m (505 ft)
- Population (2023): 303
  - Density: 22.4/km^{2} (58.0/sq mi)
- Time zone: UTC+01:00 (CET)
  - Summer (DST): UTC+02:00 (CEST)
- INSEE/Postal code: 22284 /22480
- ^{1} French Land Register data, which excludes lakes, ponds, glaciers > 1 km^{2} (0.386 sq mi or 247 acres) and river estuaries.

Saint-Connan (French pronunciation: [sɛ̃ kɔnɑ̃]; Breton: Sant-Konan) is a commune in the Côtes-d'Armor department of Brittany in northwestern France.

It is known for its long history of wine making.

== Population ==
Inhabitants of Saint-Connan are called saint-connanais in French.

== See also ==
- Communes of the Côtes-d'Armor department
