= Lescouët-Gouarec =

Lescouët-Gouarec Leskoed-Gwareg
- Commune
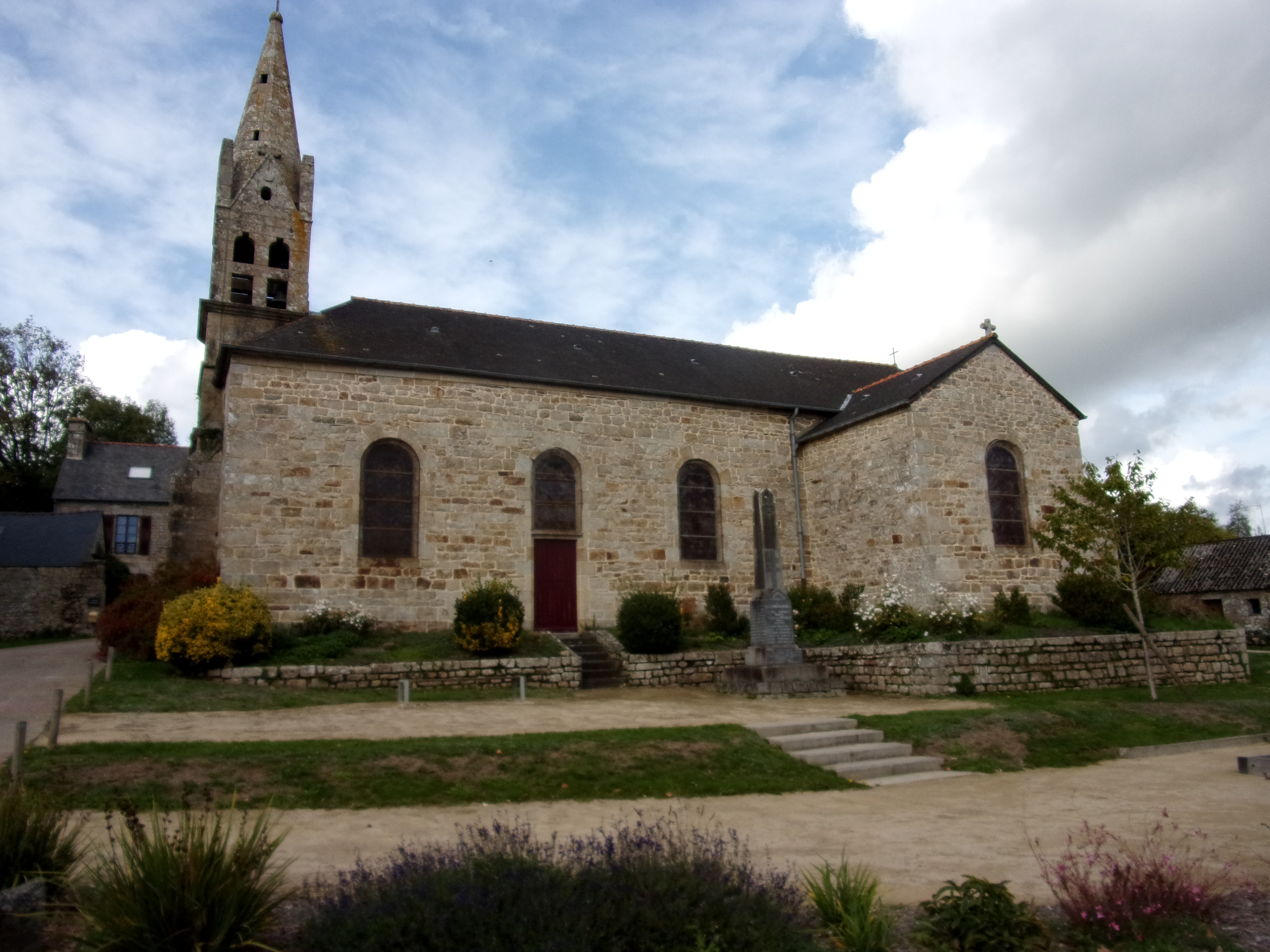
- The parish church Saint Guénaël
- Location of Lescouët-Gouarec
- Location within France Location within Brittany
- Coordinates: 48°09′39″N 3°14′36″W
- Country: France
- Region: Brittany
- Department: Côtes-d'Armor
- Arrondissement: Guingamp
- Canton: Rostrenen
- Intercommunality: Kreiz-Breizh

Government
  - Mayor (2020–2026): Marie-Claude Le Tanno-Guégan
- Area^{1}: 18.73 km^{2} (7.23 sq mi)
- Highest elevation: 270 m (890 ft)
- Lowest elevation: 169 m (554 ft)
- Population (2023): 216
  - Density: 11.5/km^{2} (29.9/sq mi)
- Time zone: UTC+01:00 (CET)
  - Summer (DST): UTC+02:00 (CEST)
- INSEE/Postal code: 22124 /22570
- ^{1} French Land Register data, which excludes lakes, ponds, glaciers > 1 km^{2} (0.386 sq mi or 247 acres) and river estuaries.

Lescouët-Gouarec (Breton: Leskoed-Gwareg) is a commune in the Côtes-d'Armor department of Brittany in northwestern France.

== Population ==
Historical population

Year	Pop.	±% p.a.
1793	1,021	—
1800	1,003	−0.25%
1806	1,041	+0.62%
1821	788	−1.84%
1831	1,108	+3.47%
1836	998	−2.07%
1841	889	−2.29%
1846	946	+1.25%
1851	788	−3.59%
1856	705	−2.20%
1861	738	+0.92%
1866	527	−6.51%
1872	718	+5.29%
1876	744	+0.89%
1881	798	+1.41%
1886	817	+0.47%
1891	802	−0.37%
1896	821	+0.47%
1901	884	+1.49%

Year	Pop.	±% p.a.
1906	858	−0.60%
1911	875	+0.39%
1921	926	+0.57%
1926	875	−1.13%
1931	838	−0.86%
1936	807	−0.75%
1946	777	−0.38%
1954	651	−2.19%
1962	560	−1.86%
1968	437	−4.05%
1975	320	−4.35%
1982	261	−2.87%
1990	211	−2.62%
1999	189	−1.22%
2007	225	+2.20%
2012	206	−1.75%
2017	223	+1.60%
2023	216	−0.53%

Source: EHESS and INSEE (1968-2023)

Inhabitants of Lescouët-Gouarec are called lescouëtais in French.

== Map ==
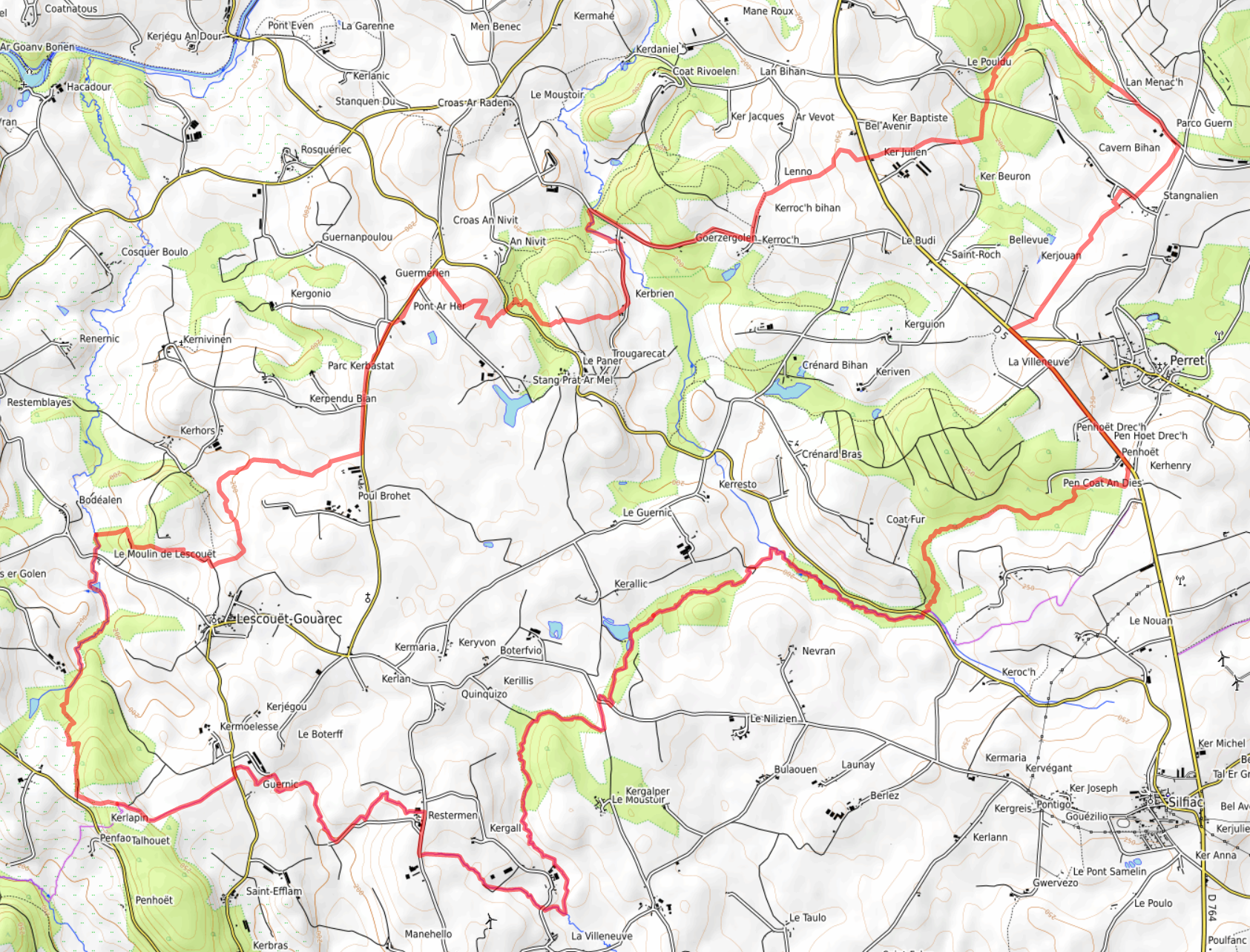
Topographic map

== See also ==
- Communes of the Côtes-d'Armor department
