= Rostrenen =

Rostrenen Rostrenenn
- Commune
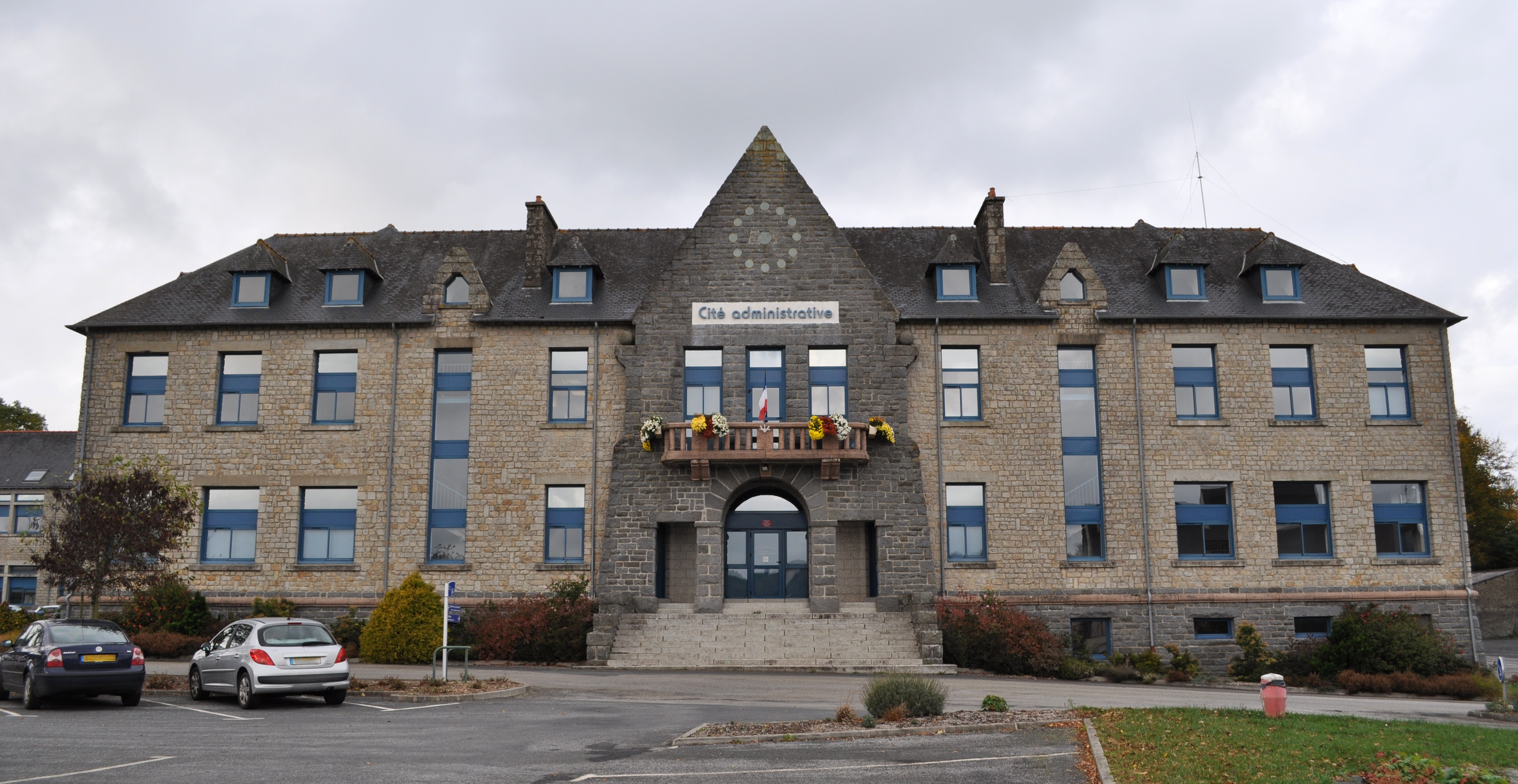
- Town hall

- Flag Coat of arms
- Location of Rostrenen
- Location within France Location within Brittany
- Coordinates: 48°14′14″N 3°18′56″W
- Country: France
- Region: Brittany
- Department: Côtes-d'Armor
- Arrondissement: Guingamp
- Canton: Rostrenen
- Intercommunality: Kreiz-Breizh

Government
  - Mayor (2020–2026): Guillaume Robic
- Area^{1}: 32.17 km^{2} (12.42 sq mi)
- Highest elevation: 262 m (860 ft)
- Lowest elevation: 152 m (499 ft)
- Population (2023): 3,282
  - Density: 102.0/km^{2} (264.2/sq mi)
- Time zone: UTC+01:00 (CET)
  - Summer (DST): UTC+02:00 (CEST)
- INSEE/Postal code: 22266 /22110
- ^{1} French Land Register data, which excludes lakes, ponds, glaciers > 1 km^{2} (0.386 sq mi or 247 acres) and river estuaries.

Rostrenen (French pronunciation: [ʁɔstʁənɛ̃]; Breton: Rostrenenn) is a commune in the French department of Côtes-d'Armor, in Brittany.

The commune is listed as a Village étape.

== Geography ==
=== Neighbouring communes ===
Rostrenen is border by Mellionnec to the south, Plouguernevel to the east, Kergrist-Moëlou to the north, and Glomel to the west.

=== Climate ===
Rostrenen has an oceanic climate (Köppen climate classification Cfb). The average annual temperature in Rostrenen is 11.1 °C (52.0 °F). The average annual rainfall is 1,146.6 mm (45.14 in) with December as the wettest month. The temperatures are highest on average in August, at around 17.3 °C (63.1 °F), and lowest in January, at around 5.6 °C (42.1 °F). The highest temperature ever recorded in Rostrenen was 39.3 °C (102.7 °F) on 18 July 2022; the coldest temperature ever recorded was −13.9 °C (7.0 °F) on 20 January 1963.

Climate data for Rostrenen, elevation: 236 m (774 ft) (1991–2020 normals, extremes 1954−present)
Month	Jan	Feb	Mar	Apr	May	Jun	Jul	Aug	Sep	Oct	Nov	Dec	Year
Record high °C (°F)	15.8 (60.4)	21.3 (70.3)	24.1 (75.4)	27.4 (81.3)	32.5 (90.5)	38.8 (101.8)	39.3 (102.7)	37.9 (100.2)	32.3 (90.1)	28.8 (83.8)	19.2 (66.6)	16.0 (60.8)	39.3 (102.7)
Mean daily maximum °C (°F)	8.0 (46.4)	8.8 (47.8)	11.3 (52.3)	13.9 (57.0)	16.9 (62.4)	19.8 (67.6)	21.7 (71.1)	21.9 (71.4)	19.4 (66.9)	15.2 (59.4)	11.2 (52.2)	8.6 (47.5)	14.7 (58.5)
Daily mean °C (°F)	5.6 (42.1)	5.8 (42.4)	7.8 (46.0)	9.7 (49.5)	12.6 (54.7)	15.3 (59.5)	17.1 (62.8)	17.3 (63.1)	15.2 (59.4)	12.0 (53.6)	8.5 (47.3)	6.1 (43.0)	11.1 (52.0)
Mean daily minimum °C (°F)	3.1 (37.6)	2.9 (37.2)	4.2 (39.6)	5.5 (41.9)	8.2 (46.8)	10.7 (51.3)	12.5 (54.5)	12.7 (54.9)	10.9 (51.6)	8.7 (47.7)	5.8 (42.4)	3.7 (38.7)	7.4 (45.3)
Record low °C (°F)	−13.9 (7.0)	−12.0 (10.4)	−7.9 (17.8)	−3.2 (26.2)	−0.2 (31.6)	2.9 (37.2)	5.9 (42.6)	5.6 (42.1)	3.0 (37.4)	−1.9 (28.6)	−5.2 (22.6)	−9.6 (14.7)	−13.9 (7.0)
Average precipitation mm (inches)	135.4 (5.33)	109.4 (4.31)	82.8 (3.26)	81.2 (3.20)	76.4 (3.01)	57.0 (2.24)	66.7 (2.63)	67.7 (2.67)	75.7 (2.98)	120.3 (4.74)	127.9 (5.04)	146.1 (5.75)	1,146.6 (45.14)
Average precipitation days (≥ 1.0 mm)	16.3	14.2	12.8	12.2	10.4	9.0	10.0	10.1	10.3	14.9	16.4	17.4	154.1
Source: Meteociel

== Population ==
In French the inhabitants of Rostrenen are known as Rostrenois.

Historical population
Year	Pop.	±% p.a.
1968	3,658	—
1975	3,875	+0.83%
1982	3,868	−0.03%
1990	3,664	−0.67%
1999	3,616	−0.15%
2007	3,392	−0.80%
2012	3,256	−0.82%
2017	3,060	−1.23%
2023	3,282	+1.17%
Source: INSEE

== Map ==
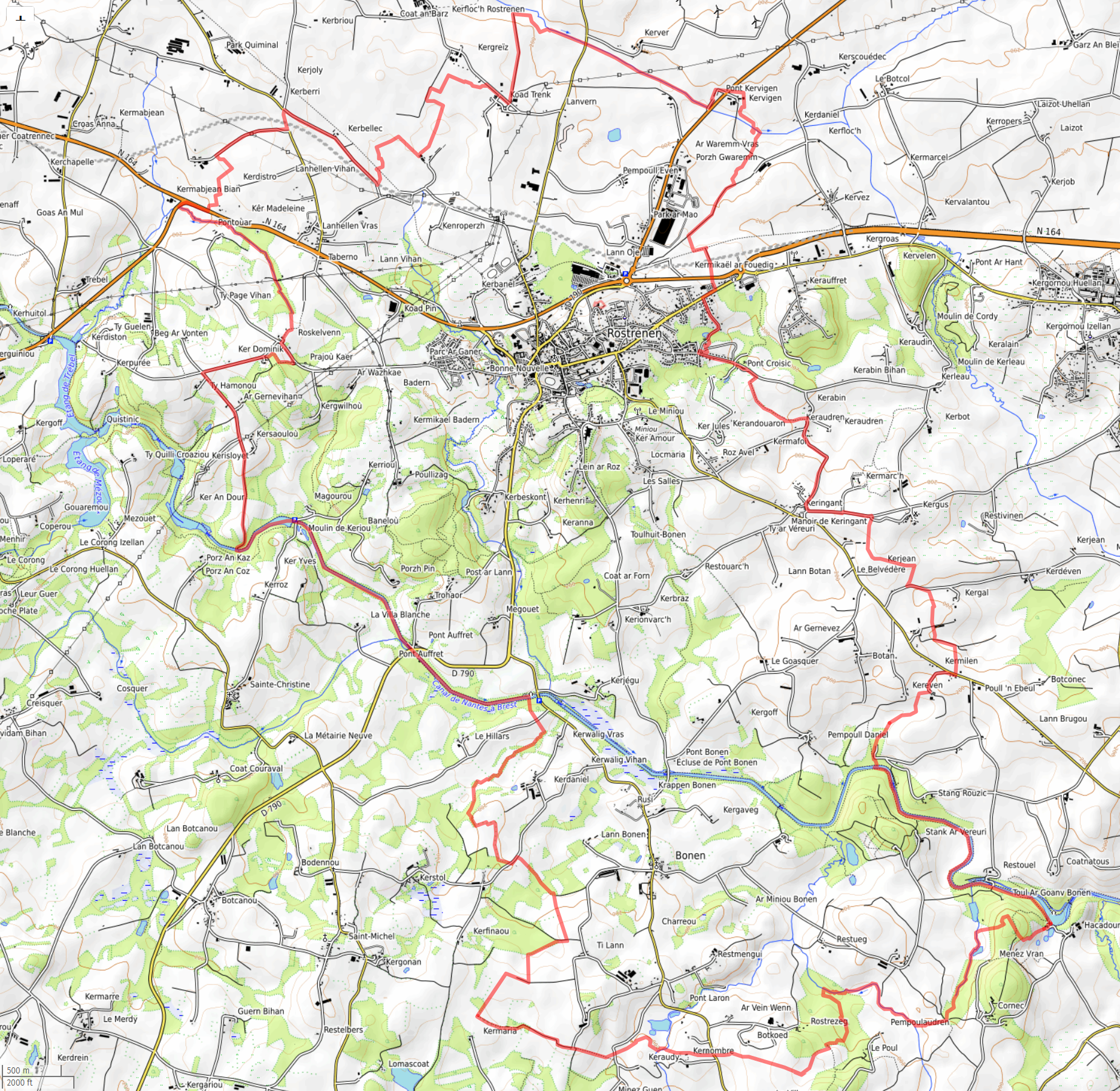
Topographic map

== Breton language ==
On 13 September 2004 the municipality launched a linguistic plan as part of the Ya d'ar brezhoneg (Yes to Breton) campaign. In 2008, 34.5% of primary children attended bilingual schools.

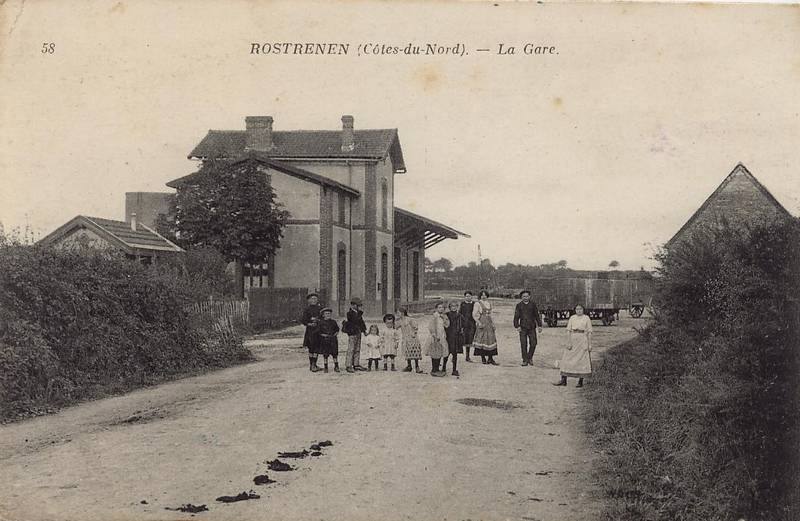
The former railway station (1898–1967)

== See also ==
- Communes of the Côtes-d'Armor department
