= Locarn =

Locarn Lokarn
- Commune
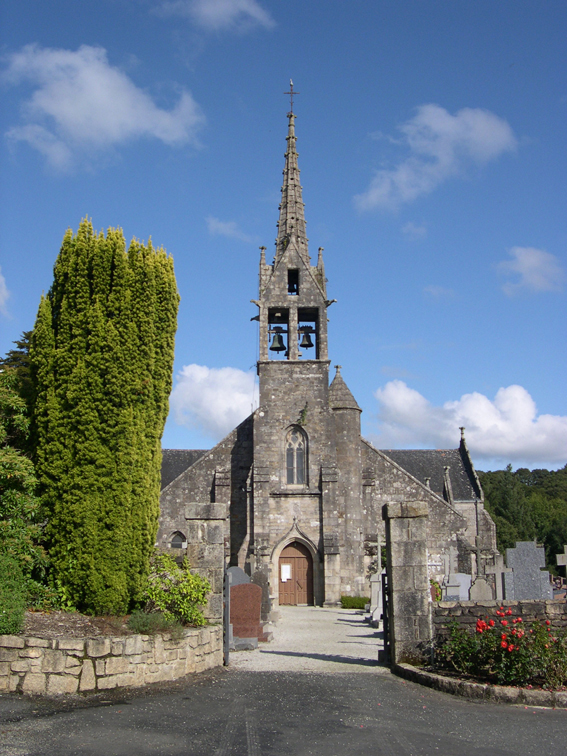
- The church of Saint-Hernin

- Coat of arms
- Location of Locarn
- Location within France Location within Brittany
- Coordinates: 48°19′14″N 3°25′15″W
- Country: France
- Region: Brittany
- Department: Côtes-d'Armor
- Arrondissement: Guingamp
- Canton: Rostrenen
- Intercommunality: Kreiz-Breizh

Government
  - Mayor (2020–2026): Marjorie Bert
- Area^{1}: 32.36 km^{2} (12.49 sq mi)
- Highest elevation: 282 m (925 ft)
- Lowest elevation: 92 m (302 ft)
- Population (2023): 434
  - Density: 13.4/km^{2} (34.7/sq mi)
- Time zone: UTC+01:00 (CET)
  - Summer (DST): UTC+02:00 (CEST)
- INSEE/Postal code: 22128 /22340
- ^{1} French Land Register data, which excludes lakes, ponds, glaciers > 1 km^{2} (0.386 sq mi or 247 acres) and river estuaries.

Locarn (French pronunciation: [lɔkaʁn]; Breton: Lokarn) is a commune in the Côtes-d'Armor department of Brittany in northwestern France.

== Population ==
Historical population
Year	Pop.	±% p.a.
1968	860	—
1975	695	−3.00%
1982	575	−2.67%
1990	525	−1.13%
1999	457	−1.53%
2007	519	+1.60%
2012	459	−2.43%
2017	407	−2.38%
2023	434	+1.08%
Source: INSEE

Inhabitants of Locarn are called locarnois or locarnais in French.

== See also ==
- Communes of the Côtes-d'Armor department
