= Trémargat =

Trémargat Tremargad
- Commune
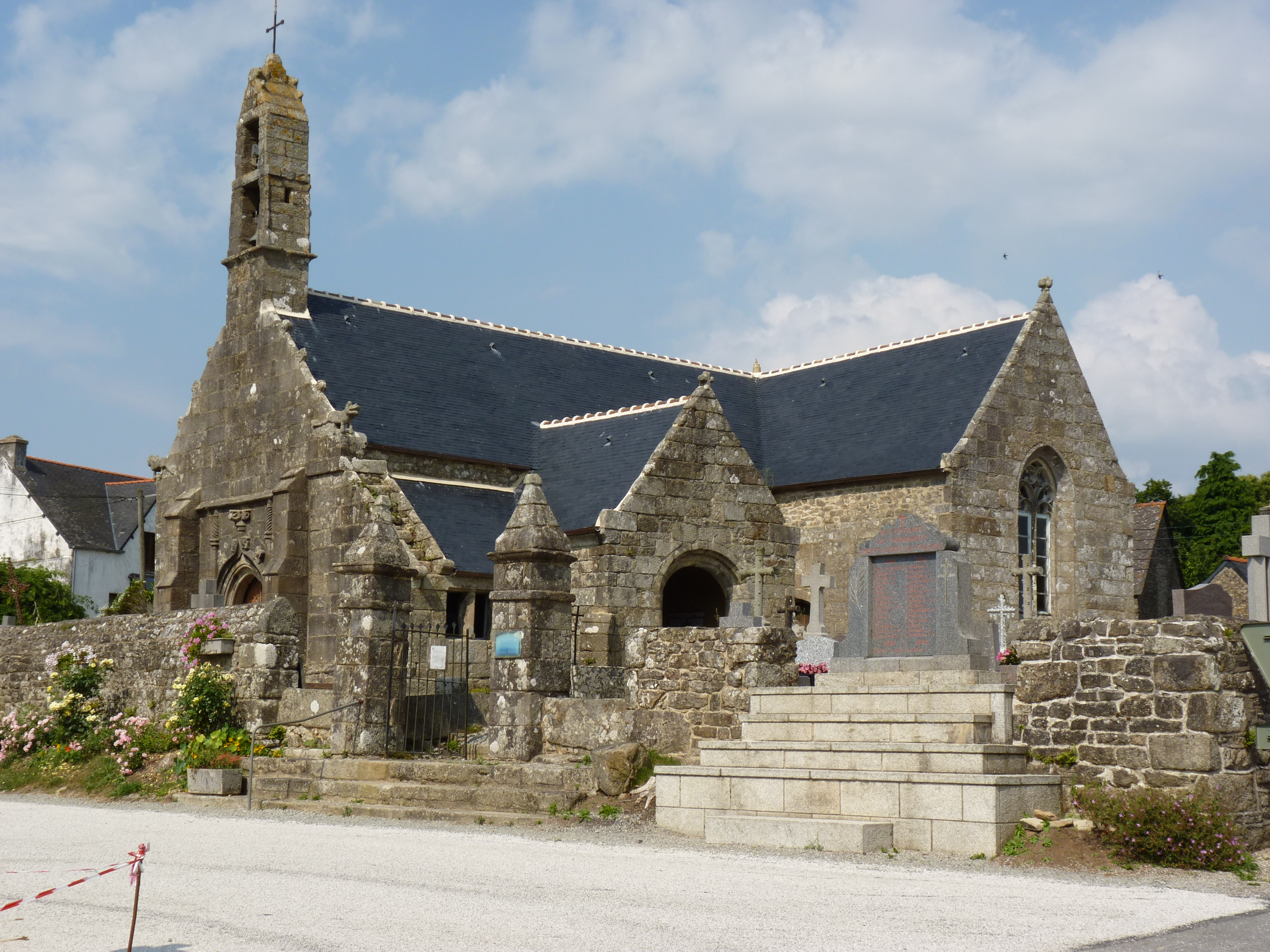
- The church of Notre-Dame, in Trémargat

- Coat of arms
- Location of Trémargat
- Location within France Location within Brittany
- Coordinates: 48°19′59″N 3°15′59″W
- Country: France
- Region: Brittany
- Department: Côtes-d'Armor
- Arrondissement: Guingamp
- Canton: Rostrenen
- Intercommunality: Kreiz-Breizh

Government
  - Mayor (2020–2026): François Salliou
- Area^{1}: 13.90 km^{2} (5.37 sq mi)
- Highest elevation: 287 m (942 ft)
- Lowest elevation: 174 m (571 ft)
- Population (2023): 183
  - Density: 13.2/km^{2} (34.1/sq mi)
- Time zone: UTC+01:00 (CET)
  - Summer (DST): UTC+02:00 (CEST)
- INSEE/Postal code: 22365 /22110
- ^{1} French Land Register data, which excludes lakes, ponds, glaciers > 1 km^{2} (0.386 sq mi or 247 acres) and river estuaries.

Trémargat (French pronunciation: [tʁemaʁɡat]; Breton: Tremargad) is a commune in the Côtes-d'Armor department of Brittany in northwestern France.

== Population ==
Historical population
Year	Pop.	±% p.a.
1968	243	—
1975	199	−2.81%
1982	187	−0.88%
1990	152	−2.56%
1999	171	+1.32%
2007	168	−0.22%
2012	188	+2.28%
2017	186	−0.21%
2023	183	−0.27%
Source: INSEE

People from Trémargat are called trémargatois in French and tremargadiz in Breton.

The commune's unusual demographics lend it to unusual political leanings; in the 2012 presidential election, Trémargat was one of the few communes where Eva Joly of Europe Ecology – The Greens secured a plurality of the vote, with 29.03% support, followed closely by Jean-Luc Mélenchon of the Left Front at 27.42%.

== See also ==
- Communes of the Côtes-d'Armor department
