= Henrik Perret =

Carl Henrik Louis Perret (born 1946) is a Finnish Lutheran pastor and titular provost.

Perret has been since 2006 the general secretary of the Theological Institute of Finland. Before this he has served as vicar in Helsinki and as president of Medi-Heli doctor helicopter service. Perret is also a member of the Synod of the Evangelical Lutheran Church of Finland since 1983.

In the autumn of 2006 Perret was runner-up in the election for bishop in the Diocese of Porvoo.
