= Peumerit-Quintin =

Peumerit-Quintin Purid-Kintin
- Commune
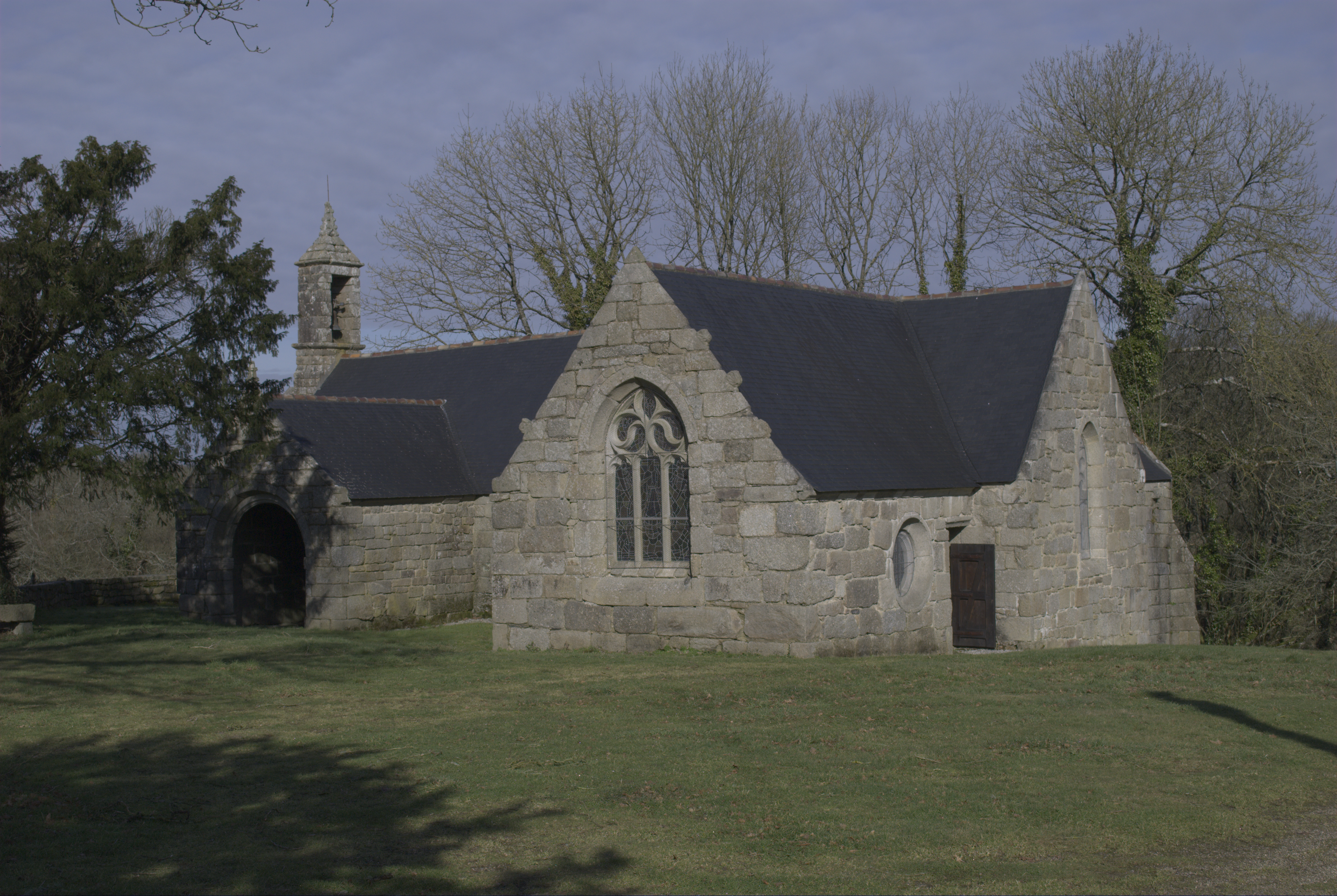
- The chapel of Le Loc'h
- Location of Peumerit-Quintin
- Location within France Location within Brittany
- Coordinates: 48°21′42″N 3°16′18″W
- Country: France
- Region: Brittany
- Department: Côtes-d'Armor
- Arrondissement: Guingamp
- Canton: Rostrenen
- Intercommunality: Kreiz-Breizh

Government
  - Mayor (2020–2026): Marie-Hélène Bernard
- Area^{1}: 14.80 km^{2} (5.71 sq mi)
- Highest elevation: 290 m (950 ft)
- Lowest elevation: 212 m (696 ft)
- Population (2023): 191
  - Density: 12.9/km^{2} (33.4/sq mi)
- Time zone: UTC+01:00 (CET)
  - Summer (DST): UTC+02:00 (CEST)
- INSEE/Postal code: 22169 /22480
- ^{1} French Land Register data, which excludes lakes, ponds, glaciers > 1 km^{2} (0.386 sq mi or 247 acres) and river estuaries.

Peumerit-Quintin (French pronunciation: [pømʁit kɛ̃tɛ̃]; Breton: Purid-Kintin) is a commune in the Côtes-d'Armor department of Brittany in northwestern France.

== Population ==
Historical population
Year	Pop.	±% p.a.
1968	295	—
1975	249	−2.39%
1982	206	−2.67%
1990	162	−2.96%
1999	148	−1.00%
2007	159	+0.90%
2012	175	+1.94%
2017	172	−0.35%
2023	191	+1.76%
Source: INSEE

Inhabitants of Peumerit-Quintin are called peumeritois in French, and puridiz in Breton.

== Breton language ==
The municipality launched a Breton linguistic plan through Ya d'ar brezhoneg on 31 January 2005.

== See also ==
- Communes of the Côtes-d'Armor department
- Listing of the works of the atelier of the Maître de Tronoën
