= Plouguernével =

Plouguernével Plougernevel
- Commune
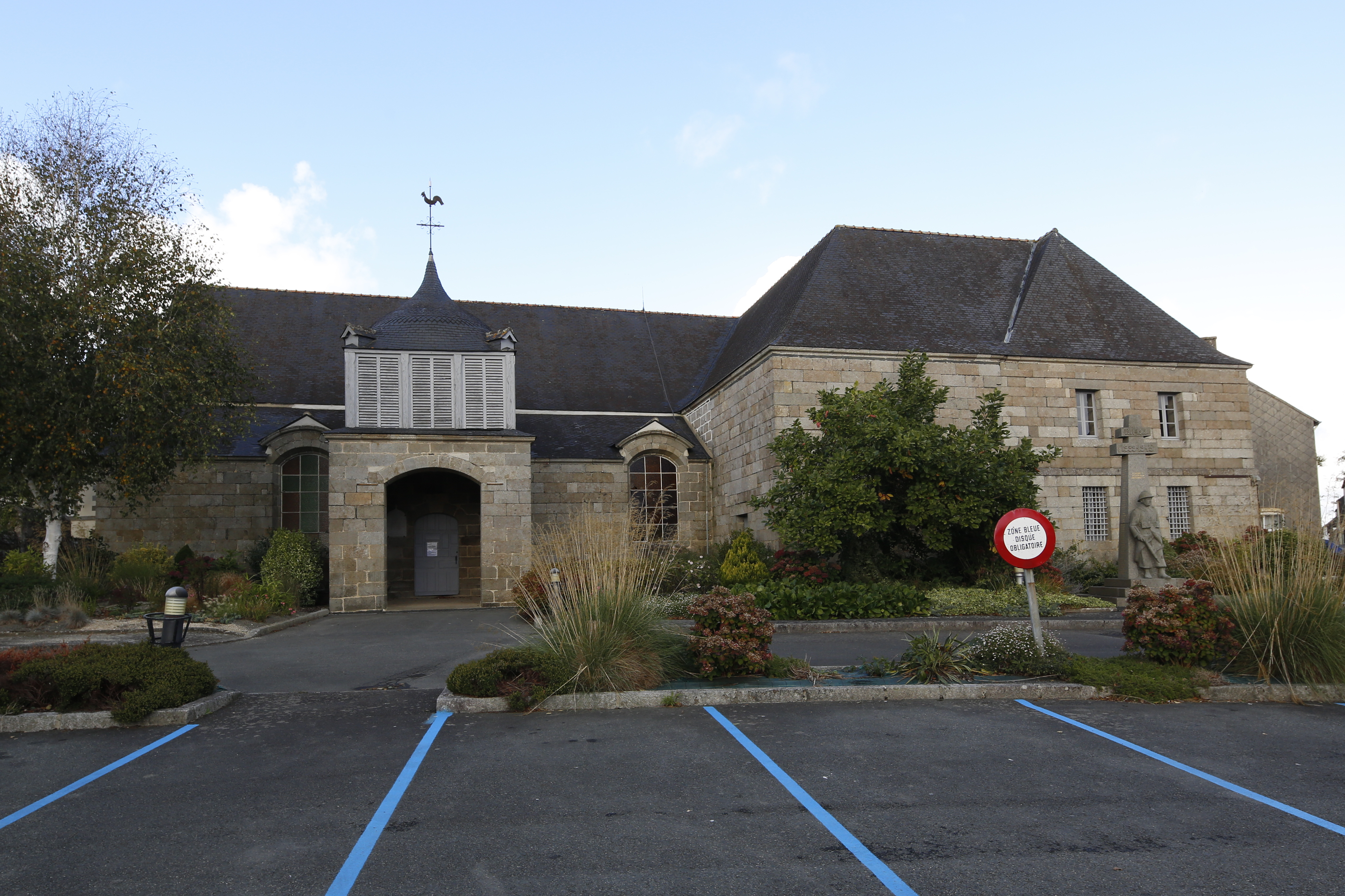
- Saint Peter's church in Plouguernével
- Location of Plouguernével
- Location within France Location within Brittany
- Coordinates: 48°14′27″N 3°15′17″W
- Country: France
- Region: Brittany
- Department: Côtes-d'Armor
- Arrondissement: Guingamp
- Canton: Rostrenen
- Intercommunality: Kreiz-Breizh

Government
  - Mayor (2020–2026): Alain Guéguen
- Area^{1}: 41.60 km^{2} (16.06 sq mi)
- Highest elevation: 235 m (771 ft)
- Lowest elevation: 132 m (433 ft)
- Population (2023): 1,601
  - Density: 38.49/km^{2} (99.68/sq mi)
- Time zone: UTC+01:00 (CET)
  - Summer (DST): UTC+02:00 (CEST)
- INSEE/Postal code: 22220 /22110
- ^{1} French Land Register data, which excludes lakes, ponds, glaciers > 1 km^{2} (0.386 sq mi or 247 acres) and river estuaries.

Plouguernével (French pronunciation: [pluɡɛʁnevɛl]; Breton: Plougernevel) is a commune in the Côtes-d'Armor department and Brittany region of north-western France.

Historically the town is noted for having participated in the Red Caps' Revolt (la révolte des Bonnets rouges) in 1675.

== Toponymy ==
The meaning of the name Plouguernével is most probably to be found in the Breton words ploe (parish), kêr (town, village), and nevez (new), although an alternative suggestion is that the last two elements may be a reference to Kernev-uhel (High Cornouaille).

== Population ==
Historical population
| Year | Pop. | ±% p.a. |
|---|---|---|
| 1968 | 2,888 | — |
| 1975 | 3,342 | +2.11% |
| 1982 | 3,585 | +1.01% |
| 1990 | 3,255 | −1.20% |
| 1999 | 2,222 | −4.15% |
| 2007 | 1,846 | −2.29% |
| 2012 | 1,752 | −1.04% |
| 2017 | 1,709 | −0.50% |
| 2023 | 1,601 | −1.08% |
Source: INSEE

In French the inhabitants of Plouguernével are known as plouguistes.

== See also ==
- Communes of the Côtes-d'Armor department
