= Tréogan =

Tréogan Treogan
- Commune
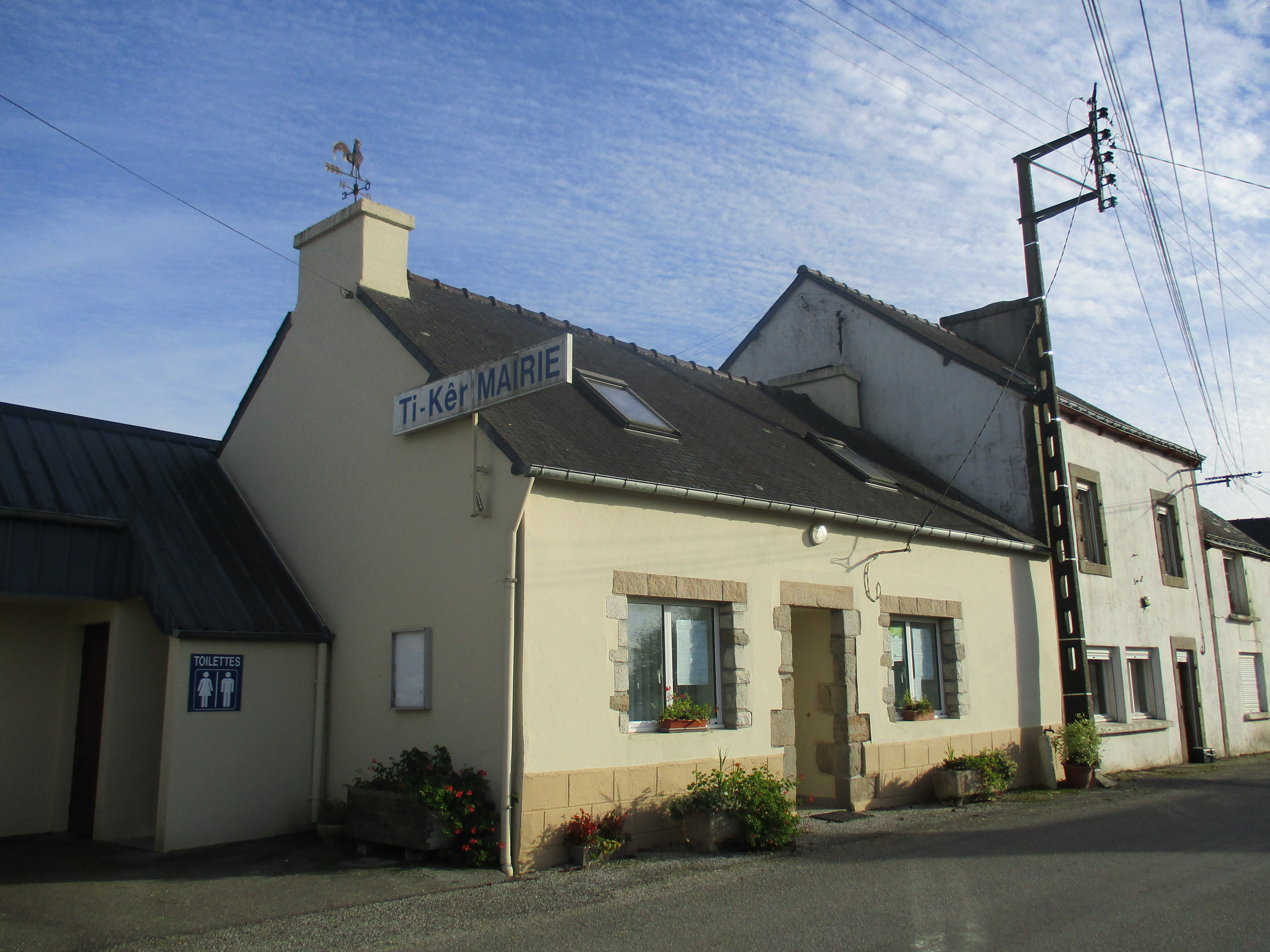
- The town hall of Tréogan

- Coat of arms
- Location of Tréogan
- Location within France Location within Brittany
- Coordinates: 48°11′24″N 3°31′07″W
- Country: France
- Region: Brittany
- Department: Côtes-d'Armor
- Arrondissement: Guingamp
- Canton: Rostrenen
- Intercommunality: Poher Communauté

Government
  - Mayor (2024–2026): Bruno Le Goff
- Area^{1}: 7.10 km^{2} (2.74 sq mi)
- Highest elevation: 293 m (961 ft)
- Lowest elevation: 135 m (443 ft)
- Population (2023): 106
  - Density: 14.9/km^{2} (38.7/sq mi)
- Time zone: UTC+01:00 (CET)
  - Summer (DST): UTC+02:00 (CEST)
- INSEE/Postal code: 22373 /22340
- ^{1} French Land Register data, which excludes lakes, ponds, glaciers > 1 km^{2} (0.386 sq mi or 247 acres) and river estuaries.

Tréogan (Breton: Treogan) is a commune in the Côtes-d'Armor department of Brittany in northwestern France.

== Population ==
Historical population
Year	Pop.	±% p.a.
1968	168	—
1975	160	−0.69%
1982	162	+0.18%
1990	138	−1.98%
1999	119	−1.63%
2007	101	−2.03%
2012	99	−0.40%
2017	100	+0.20%
2023	106	+0.98%
Source: INSEE

Inhabitants of Tréogan are called tréoganais in French.

== See also ==
- Communes of the Côtes-d'Armor department
