= Maël-Carhaix =

Maël-Carhaix Mêl-Karaez
- Commune
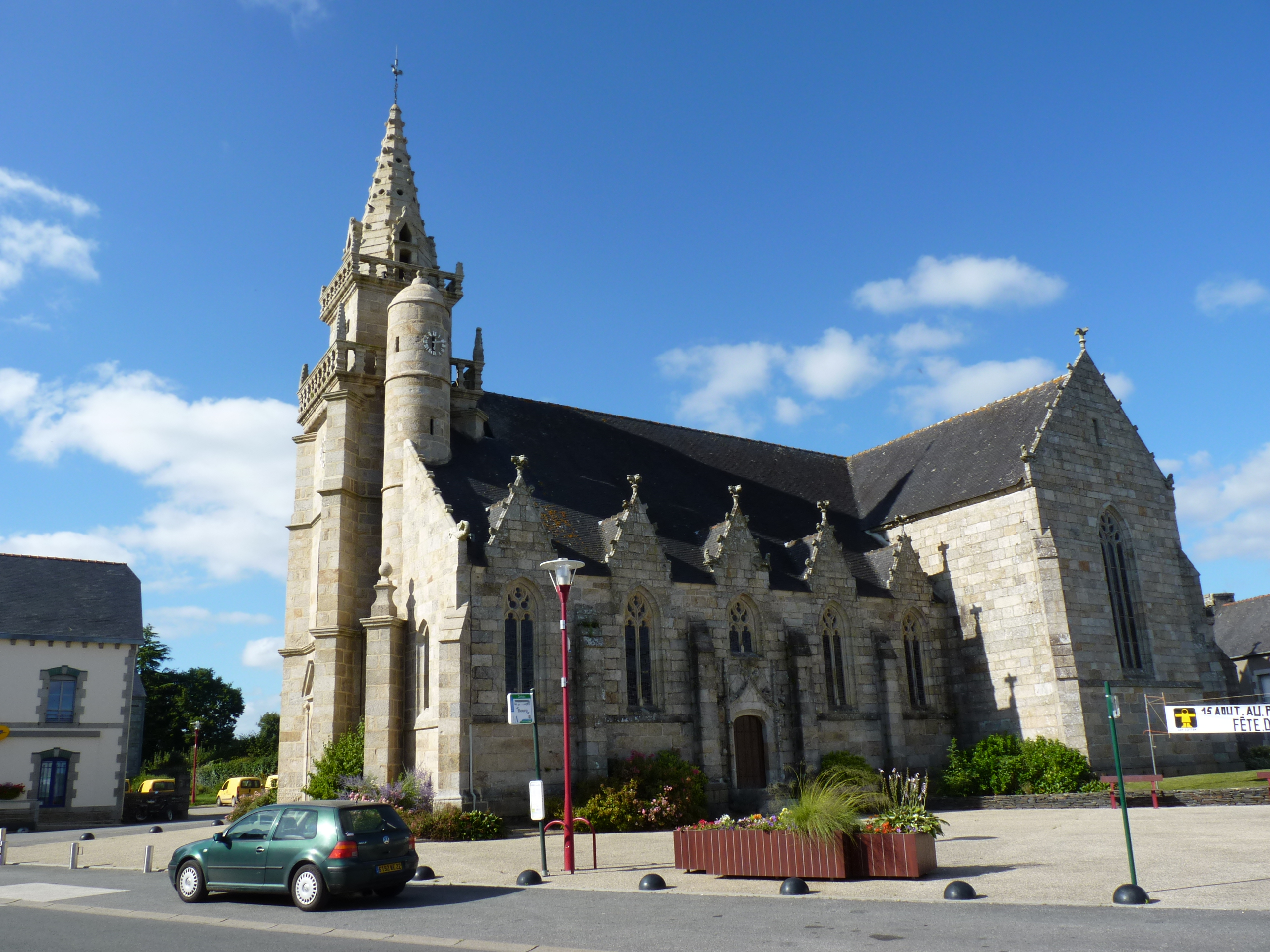
- The church of Saint-Pierre, in Maël-Carhaix

- Coat of arms
- Location of Maël-Carhaix
- Location within France Location within Brittany
- Coordinates: 48°17′03″N 3°25′24″W
- Country: France
- Region: Brittany
- Department: Côtes-d'Armor
- Arrondissement: Guingamp
- Canton: Rostrenen
- Intercommunality: Kreiz-Breizh

Government
  - Mayor (2020–2026): Rolande Le Borgne
- Area^{1}: 36.57 km^{2} (14.12 sq mi)
- Highest elevation: 243 m (797 ft)
- Lowest elevation: 114 m (374 ft)
- Population (2023): 1,497
  - Density: 40.94/km^{2} (106.0/sq mi)
- Time zone: UTC+01:00 (CET)
  - Summer (DST): UTC+02:00 (CEST)
- INSEE/Postal code: 22137 /22340
- ^{1} French Land Register data, which excludes lakes, ponds, glaciers > 1 km^{2} (0.386 sq mi or 247 acres) and river estuaries.

Maël-Carhaix (French pronunciation: [mɛl kaʁɛ]; Breton: Mêl-Karaez) is a commune in the Côtes-d'Armor department of Brittany in northwestern France.

== Population ==
Historical population
Year	Pop.	±% p.a.
1968	2,046	—
1975	1,832	−1.57%
1982	1,663	−1.37%
1990	1,613	−0.38%
1999	1,538	−0.53%
2007	1,539	+0.01%
2012	1,612	+0.93%
2017	1,499	−1.44%
2023	1,497	−0.02%
Source: INSEE

Inhabitants of Maël-Carhaix are called maël-carhaisiens in French.

== Breton language ==
In 2023, 40.9% of primary school children attended bilingual schools.

== See also ==
- Communes of the Côtes-d'Armor department
