= Le Moustoir =

Le Moustoir Ar Vouster
- Commune
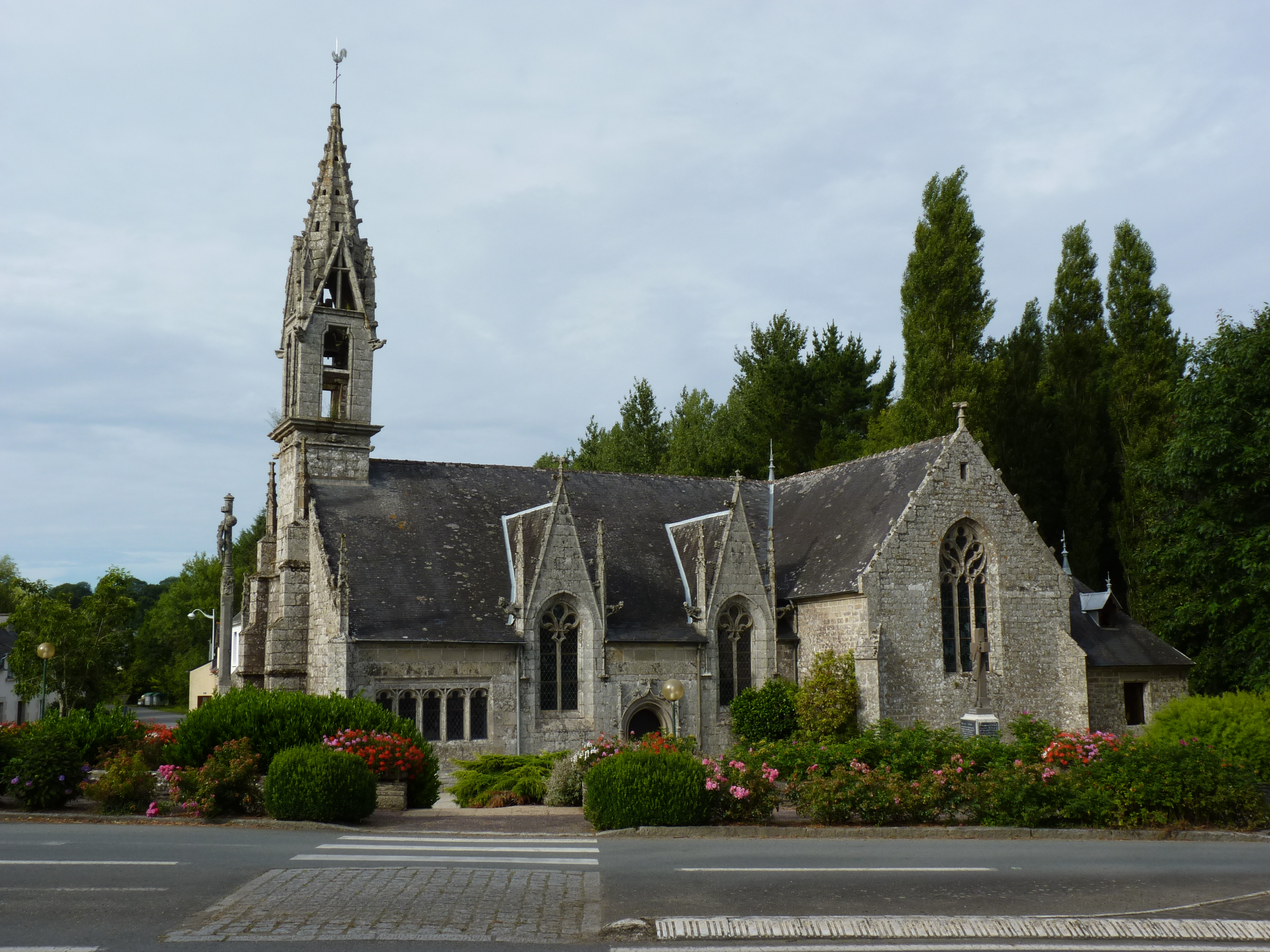
- The church of Saint-Juvénal, in Le Moustoir
- Location of Le Moustoir
- Location within France Location within Brittany
- Coordinates: 48°15′59″N 3°30′03″W
- Country: France
- Region: Brittany
- Department: Côtes-d'Armor
- Arrondissement: Guingamp
- Canton: Rostrenen
- Intercommunality: Poher Communauté

Government
  - Mayor (2020–2026): Cédric Le Moroux
- Area^{1}: 14.85 km^{2} (5.73 sq mi)
- Highest elevation: 192 m (630 ft)
- Lowest elevation: 98 m (322 ft)
- Population (2023): 656
  - Density: 44.2/km^{2} (114/sq mi)
- Time zone: UTC+01:00 (CET)
  - Summer (DST): UTC+02:00 (CEST)
- INSEE/Postal code: 22157 /22340
- ^{1} French Land Register data, which excludes lakes, ponds, glaciers > 1 km^{2} (0.386 sq mi or 247 acres) and river estuaries.

Le Moustoir (French pronunciation: [lə mustwaʁ]; Breton: Ar Vouster) is a commune in the Côtes-d'Armor department of Brittany in northwestern France.

== Population ==
Historical population
Year	Pop.	±% p.a.
1968	514	—
1975	476	−1.09%
1982	523	+1.35%
1990	549	+0.61%
1999	583	+0.67%
2007	632	+1.01%
2012	690	+1.77%
2017	666	−0.71%
2023	656	−0.25%
Source: INSEE

Inhabitants of Le Moustoir are called moustoiriens in French.

== See also ==
- Communes of the Côtes-d'Armor department
- Listing of the works of the atelier of the Maître de Tronoën
