= Canton of Rostrenen =

Administrative division of the Côtes-d'Armor department

Coordinates: 48.24°N 3.32°W

The canton of Rostrenen is an administrative division of the Côtes-d'Armor department, northwestern France. Its borders were modified at the French canton reorganisation which came into effect in March 2015. Its seat is in Rostrenen.

It consists of the following communes:

1. Bon Repos sur Blavet
2. Canihuel
3. Glomel
4. Gouarec
5. Kergrist-Moëlou
6. Lanrivain
7. Lescouët-Gouarec
8. Locarn
9. Maël-Carhaix
10. Mellionnec
11. Le Moustoir
12. Paule
13. Peumerit-Quintin
14. Plélauff
15. Plévin
16. Plouguernével
17. Plounévez-Quintin
18. Rostrenen
19. Saint-Connan
20. Sainte-Tréphine
21. Saint-Gilles-Pligeaux
22. Saint-Igeaux
23. Saint-Nicolas-du-Pélem
24. Trébrivan
25. Treffrin
26. Trémargat
27. Tréogan
