= Thomas Salic =

French entrepreneur

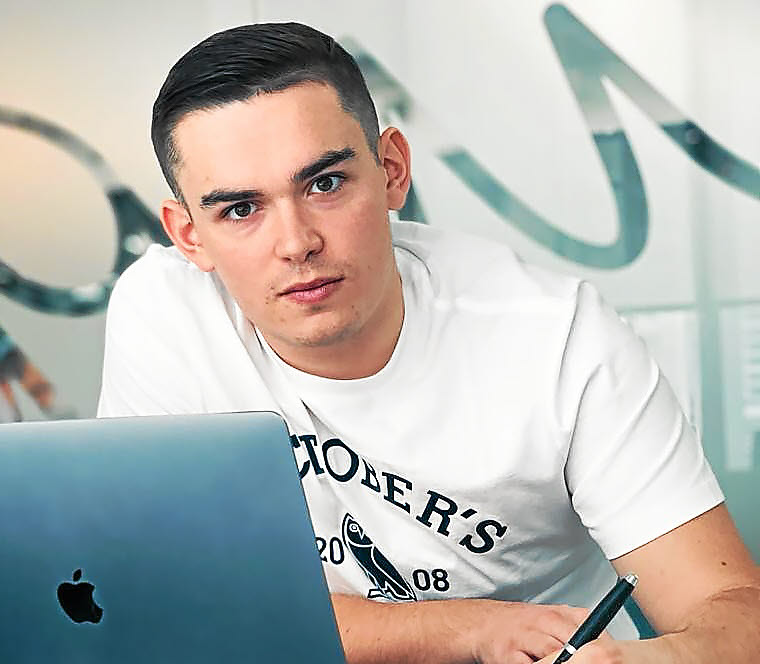
- Born: 1998 (age 27–28); Saint-Brieuc, France
- Occupation: Entrepreneur
- Years active: Since 2014
- Awards: Medal of Honor from the city of Ploumagoar (2017)

Thomas Salic (born 1998 in Saint-Brieuc) is a French entrepreneur.

== Education ==
Thomas Salic obtained his baccalaureate in Computer Science in 2017 at the Lycée Sacré Coeur. He got 2 years after a BTS in Management of Commercial Units from the Lycée Notre-Dame in Guingamp.

== Career ==
In June 2014, then 15 years old, Thomas Salic started selling online services to generate his first income.

In January 2017, he created his own company, called Footycase and specialized in selling of football-themed phone cases.

He started with the creation of customizable cases in the colors of the big Ligue 1 clubs. Then he extended the project to cover the other big European leagues. In October 2018, he succeeded in obtaining an official license from AS Saint-Étienne. Months later, he also became an official partner of FC Nantes, OGC Nice and En Avant Guingamp.

Thomas Salic has announced that several professional players have been offered his phone cases, including Alassane Pléa, Neymar, Ousmane Dembelé and Kylian Mbappé:

The one who is most visible at the moment is Kylian Mbappé, the Real Madrid player. He always has his cell phone with him. I also traded a case with OGC Nice player Boscagli for his jersey.

Before the 2018 FIFA World Cup, having learned of the French Football Federation's desire to put an end to unlicensed cases and regulate the market, Thomas Salic seized the opportunity and contacted the marketing department of the federation. He succeeded in passing to the testing phase by offering more than 100 cases in premium packaging 3 days before departure for Russia. Feedback from players (notably Mendy, Mbappé and Areola) was positive and a one-year license agreement was reached. By winning this contract, Thomas Salic made the headlines and the subject of a France 3 report.

By winning the title, FootyCase released a new collection of cases. They contained the name of the player, the acronym of the FFF and two stars in reference to two World Cups won in the history of the Blues. In this operation, Thomas Salic recorded a great increase in sales, especially thanks to the phone cases of Kylian Mbappé and Antoine Griezmann.

In December 2019, Thomas Salic sold his shares in the company and settled in Dubai. He then created OhMyCase, which also manufactures and markets customizable phone cases, and which has become the number 1 website for customizable cases in France.

Thomas Salic decided to start a career as an e-commerce consultant and offered his services to brands and companies. Through his company SpaceBrands, he supported more than 250 entrepreneurs in developing their brands.

In 2021, he launched Metabillionaire, the world's first NFT project for entrepreneurs, which allows entrepreneurs around the world to connect and exchange in a new world linked to the metaverse. The project launch was a success with all parts sold (7777).

Thomas Salic is increasingly focusing on the field of cryptocurrencies. He also invests in art and startups, including Legion Farm and Baubap.

== Awards and recognition ==
In 2017, he received the Medal of Honor from the city of Ploumagoar for his entrepreneurial initiatives.
