= Olivier Martinez (disambiguation) =

Olivier Martinez may refer to:

- Olivier Martinez (born 1966), French actor
- Olivier Martinez (footballer) (born 1966), French footballer

== See also ==
- Olivier Martinet, French architect
