= Basilica of Notre-Dame-de-Bon-Secours, Guingamp =

Catholic church in Brittany, France

Basilica of Notre-Dame de Bon Secours, Guingamp Basilique Notre-Dame-de-Bon-Secours de Guingamp
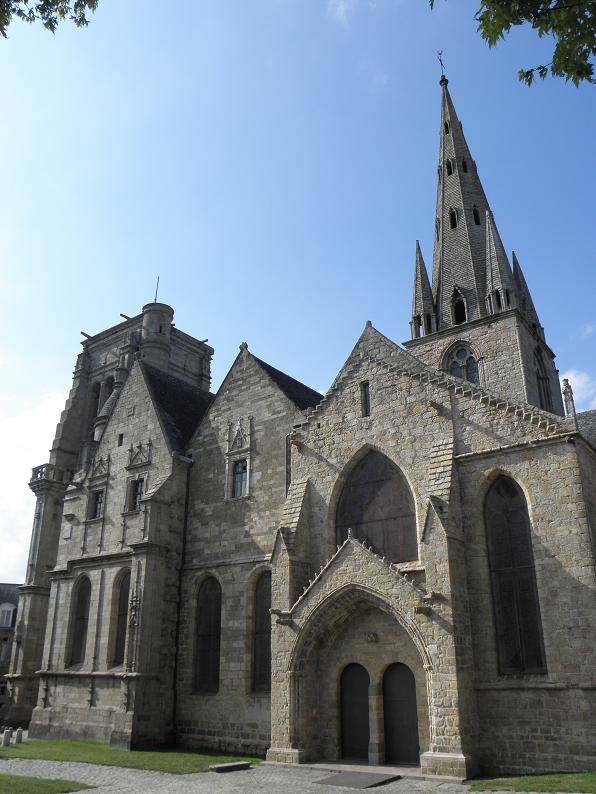
- Southern view of the basilica

Religion
- Affiliation: Catholic
- District: Diocese of Saint-Brieuc
- Status: Basilica

Location
- Location: Guingamp, Côtes-d'Armor, Brittany, France
- Interactive map of Basilica of Notre-Dame de Bon Secours, Guingamp; Basilique Notre-Dame-de-Bon-Secours de Guingamp
- Coordinates: 48.561144°N 3.150851°W

Website
- Paroisse Notre-Dame de Bon-Secours de Guingamp

The Basilica of Notre-Dame de Bon Secours (French: Basilique Notre-Dame-de-Bon-Secours de Guingamp) is located in the town of Guingamp, in Brittany, France. Originally a castle chapel and then a parish church, built not later than the early 12th century, it became a Marian pilgrimage destination dedicated to Our Lady of Good Help which gained prominence in the 17th century. It was raised to the status of a minor basilica in 1899.

== History ==
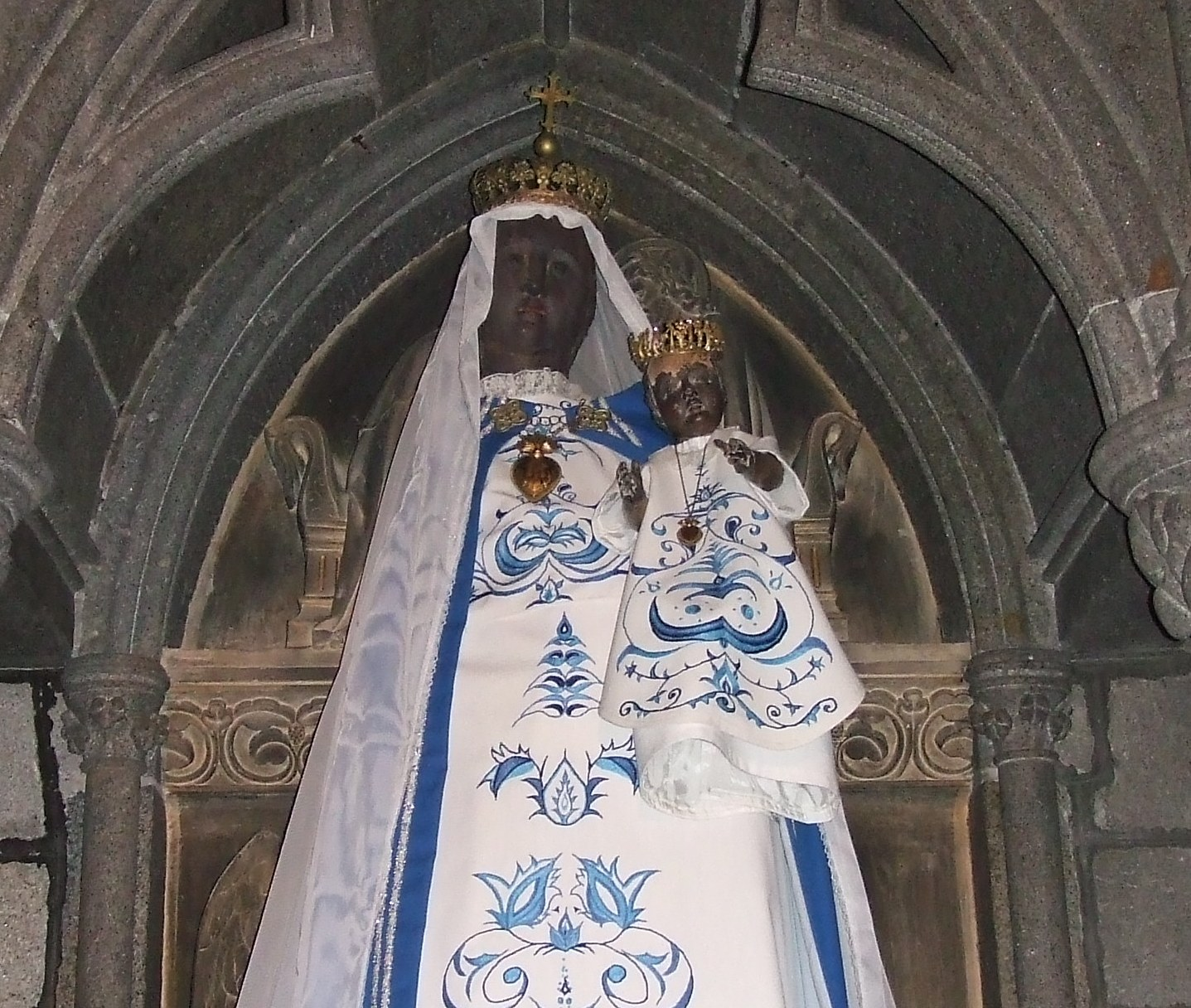
Statue of Notre-Dame de Bon Secours (Our Lady of Good Help)

In 1093, Stephen I, Count of Penthièvre, inherited the countship of Penthièvre following the death of his elder brother, Count Geoffrey I. He significantly developed the town and its surroundings. Within the city walls, the former castle chapel became a respected and influential parish church.

In the 12th century, the church was successively dedicated to Saint Peter, Saint Paul and the Blessed Virgin Mary, becoming a Marian pilgrimage site.

In the early 13th century, a major collapse necessitated extensive reconstruction, which lasted over fifty years and was completed around 1350 under Charles de Blois, Duke of Brittany. The duke contributed to the construction of the sacristy, laying its first stone, and the high altar. The church and town endured hardships during the War of the Breton Succession and the French Wars of Religion. It was not until the mid-17th century that the church's prominence and the cult of the Virgin Mary gained significant recognition.

In February 1448 Pope Nicholas V granted "five years of indulgence and five quarantines (Note: a quarantine in this context is an indulgence of 40 days)" to those visiting the church, which had been damaged by wars, on the Nativity of the Virgin Mary (8 September). In 1466, the confraternity of the Disciples of Our Lord Jesus Christ, reportedly joined by Duke Peter II of Brittany (d. 1457), adopted the name "Frairie Blanche". This group initially comprised Guingamp residents from the clergy, nobility and common people. On 18 April 1619, a papal bull from Pope Paul V granted a plenary indulgence to "all those members of the confraternity who, being truly penitent, after having made confession and received holy communion, visit the said church of Notre-Dame of Guingamp on the feast of the Visitation, customarily celebrated every year on the first Sunday of July" (Note: "tous les confrères qui, vraiment pénitents, confessés et communiés visiteront ladite église de Notre-Dame de Guingamp, au jour et fête de la Visitation de la bienheureuse Vierge Marie, qu'on a coutume de célébrer chaque année le premier dimanche de juillet). In 1650, a major regional pilgrimage was organised based on the church and its statue of the Virgin Mary, significantly enhancing its prominence.

In 1669, the Notre-Dame pilgrimage became the diocese's primary pilgrimage. On 25 March 1676, the feast of the Annunciation, the devotion to the Virgin of the Portal was formalized as ITRON VARIA GWIR ZICOUR (Lady Mary of True Help), or Our Lady of Good Help. Historian Hervé Le Goff cites a Guingamp notary, Pierre Hamon, who recorded: "The gift made by the people of Guingamp to the Virgin under the name of Our Lady of Good Help was blessed, and the gift was carried through the town in a general procession. I paid 15 sous to help obtain the image of this gift." This devotion persisted throughout the 18th century.

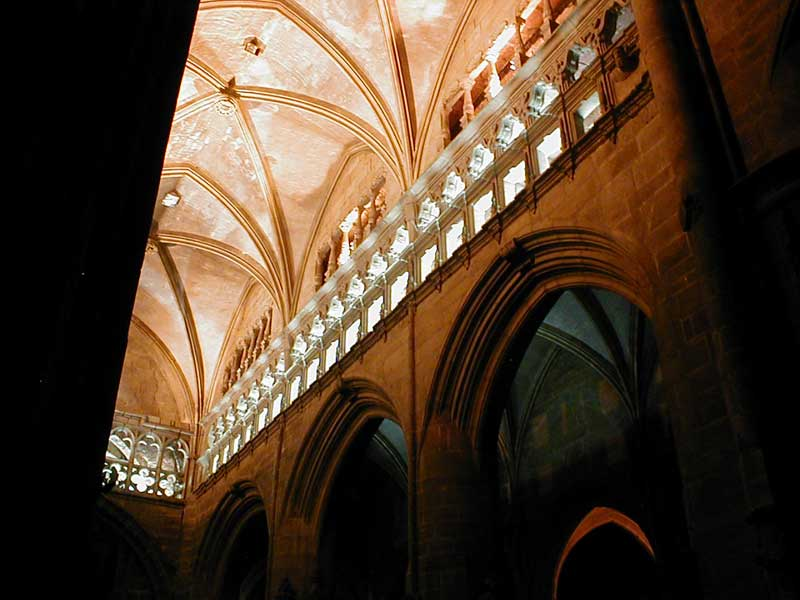
Interior of the basilica

Initially, Notre-Dame-de-Bon-Secours held parish status alongside other churches, such as Saint-Leonard, Saint-Michael, and The Trinity. However, following the French Revolution, which saw the destruction of many religious buildings, the Concordat of 1801 signed by Napoleon Bonaparte and Pope Pius VII left Notre-Dame-de-Bon-Secours as the sole active parish. In 1857, the Virgin was crowned under Pope Pius IX, and on 24 October 1899, a papal bull from Pope Leo XIII elevated the sanctuary to the status of a minor basilica.

Construction began in the 12th century and was largely completed by the 16th century. Multiple restorations, prompted by historical events and natural wear, have significantly altered the basilica's appearance over time.

Notable events include a 1535 hurricane that caused the collapse of a tower adjacent to the western portal, damaging the portal, a side nave, part of the main nave, the organ, and nearby houses. During the Revolution, the basilica was looted, with columbariums and altars destroyed. The Notre-Dame porch was vandalized, the sacristy turned into a prison, and the church was used as a stable and storage for hay. In 1944, during the Liberation of Guingamp, an American shell destroyed the upper part of the central tower, mistaken for housing German soldiers when it was actually occupied by French resistance fighters. The last major restoration, led by parish priest Jean-Marie Robin, occurred in the 19th century, addressing both the exterior (porches, vaults) and interior (stained glass, altars, statues).

Despite historical and natural challenges, the basilica has been preserved through the generosity of numerous donors and the skill of master builders. It was designated a monument historique in 1914.

== Construction phases ==
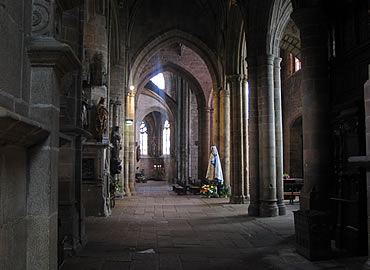
South collateral of the basilica

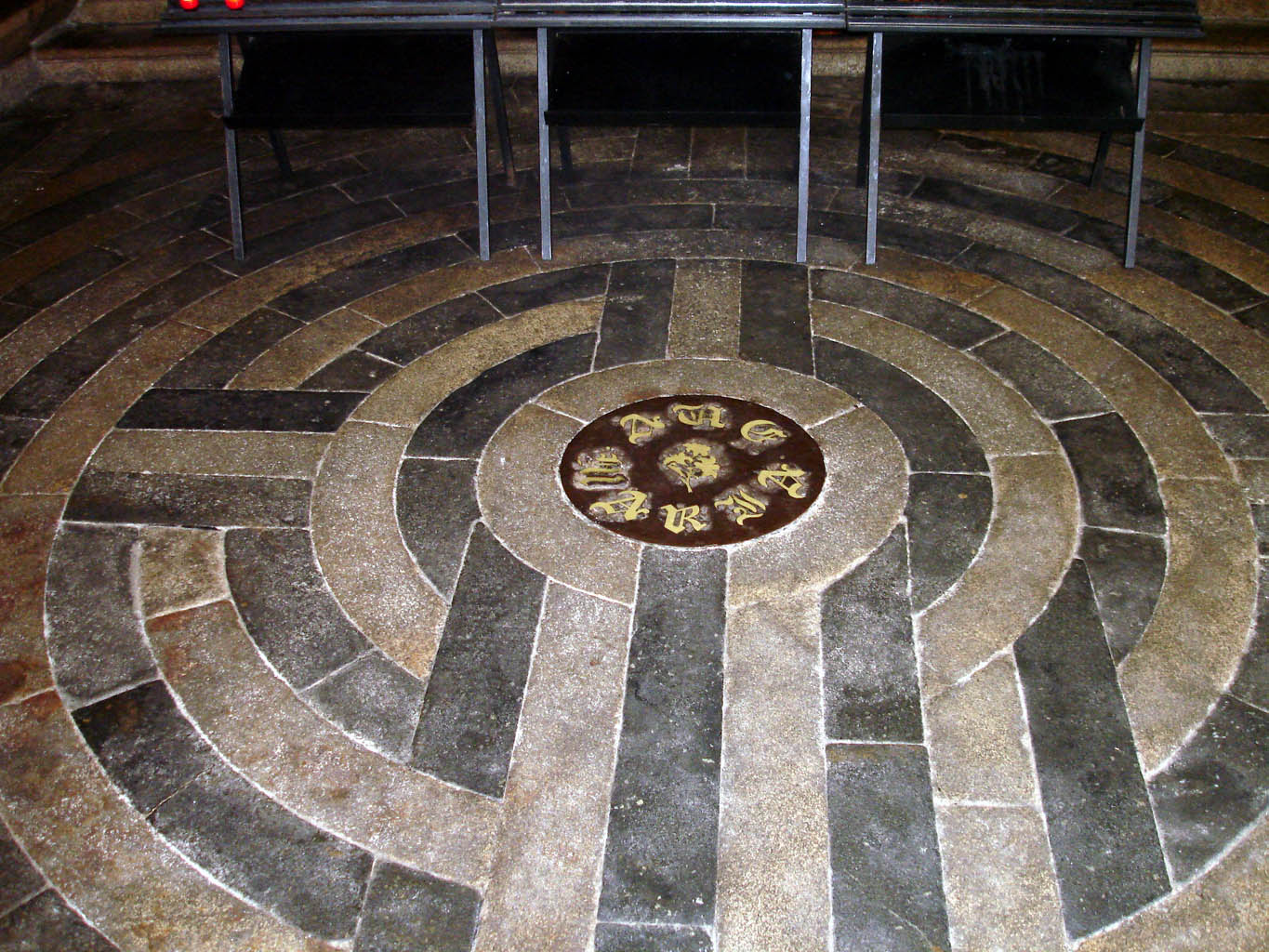
Labyrinth inside the basilica

- 11th or 12th century: Exact construction dates are uncertain. Romanesque elements are visible in the transept's pillars, walls, and ogival arches.
- 13th century: Construction of the Notre-Dame oratory and the northern nave.
- 14th century: Construction of the choir (excluding the chevet), transept ends, and northern section following the oratory, including the sacristy (excluding later additions).
- 15th century: Construction of the chevet and ambulatory; reinforcement of transept crossing pillars; restoration of eastern stained glass.
- 16th century: Restoration of the southern aisle and western portal; construction of the Renaissance Tower and southern nave.
- 17th century: Modification of the southern wall, expansion of the Notre-Dame oratory, and organ restoration.
- 18th century: Reinforcement of the northwest massif.
- 19th century: Near-complete restoration, including stained glass, statues, porches, and facades; organ restoration.
- 20th century: Restoration of the Central Tower, southern parvis, and southern aisle stained glass.

== Architectural features ==
=== Central Tower ===
Located at the basilica's center, this 57-meter tower is topped with an octagonal granite spire featuring a wrought-iron cross and a rooster. It originally had three corner turrets, now four, with large bays on each face of the first floor. The tower was damaged during the 1944 Liberation.

=== Renaissance Tower ===
Situated on the south side of the western facade, this tower, built in the 16th century, showcases Renaissance architecture. Constructed with polished granite, it features molded cornices across two levels. A turret houses a staircase leading to a first-floor balcony with colonnettes, large bell chamber windows, and a platform with cannon-shaped channels.

The bell chamber, restored in 1988, houses several bells, including La Grignouse, Marie-Louise-Mathias, Adrienne-Joséphine-Louise-Marie, and Erwann-Maurice. The largest, weighing two tons, bears a 1568 inscription: "Made by the Guyomark founders. In 1568, this bell was made to serve God and Our Lady of Guingamp, commissioned by Gérome Gégou, governor of this chapel." The oldest, cast in 1430, is located in the southern absidiole and inscribed: "M CCC XXX . B.Michel - O.Pennec – M.A.Brun - Fabrice." The smallest, La Grignouse (1434, 170 kg), and the largest are listed as historical monuments.

Following the 1535 collapse of a southwestern tower, which damaged the western portal, side nave, main nave, organ, and nearby houses, the Renaissance Tower was rebuilt starting in 1536, designed by Jean Le Moal. Builders included Gilles Le Nouesec (1548–1554), Jean Le Cozic (1566–1570), Yves Auffret (1574, 1580), and Rolland Montfort for the framework. The chapel's fleur-de-lis windows were crafted in 1581 by Yves Auffret, and the organ's large stained-glass window was made in 1624 by Alain Raperou and Jan Lelouet. Granite likely came from Kerempilly (Bourbriac), Dame du Parc (Scouasel), and Kerlosquer quarries.

=== Clock Tower ===
Located on the north side of the western facade, this is the oldest part of the church after the Romanesque foundations. Its graceful ogival arches are topped with molded gables. The square slate roof features an octagonal turret, once a watchtower, with a 15th-century clock that sparked a 1471 dispute between the Bishop of Tréguier's representative and the townspeople's procurator. Quarter-hour chimes were added in 1688, and a blue granite spur reinforced the tower in 1780. The turret's spire was removed in 1980. Inside, the chapel of Charles de Blois houses the tombs of canons Yves-Marie Lemen (parish priest, 1919–1940) and Pierre Le Maigat (parish priest, 1950–1964).

=== Notre-Dame Portal ===
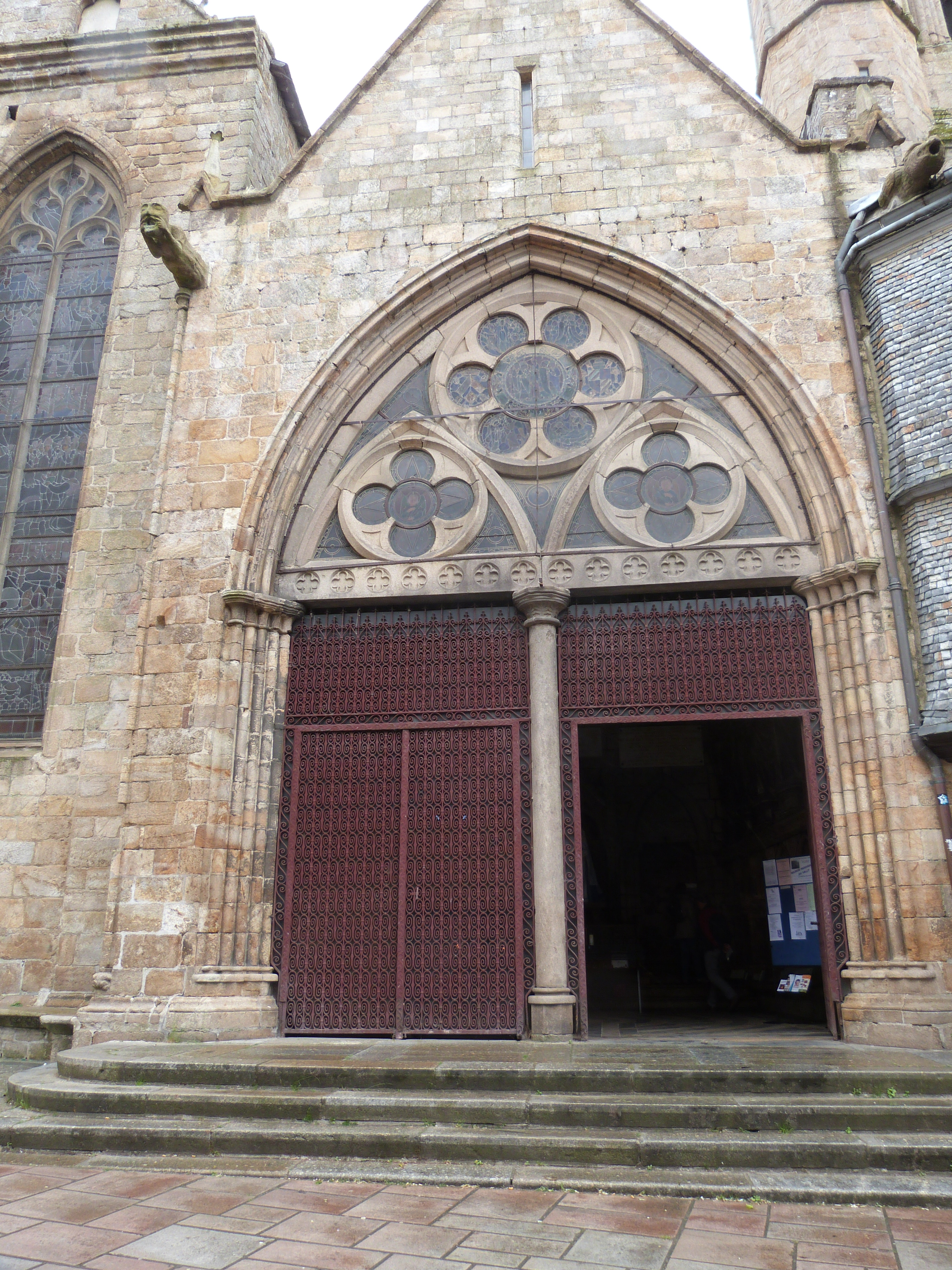
Notre-Dame Portal

The Notre-Dame Portal, located on the basilica's northern facade, features a wrought-iron gate divided by a central pillar topped with a band of quatrefoil rosettes. Flanking the portal, clusters of colonnettes with foliage capitals support a molded, pointed arch. Gargoyles protrude from the facade, adding a menacing touch to the pedestrian street below. A few steps lead into the Virgin's chapel, where a stained-glass window from 1857 by Adolphe Napoléon Didron is visible under the arch.

The window comprises a six-lobed rose and two quatrefoil circles. Above the central pillar, a small stained-glass panel displays the initials N, D, and A (likely for Notre-Dame and the glassmaker) encircled in yellow. Flanking it, quatrefoils with red triangles frame two angels, identical except for their blue and purple robes. The rose depicts the crowning of the Virgin and Child, encircled by Brittany's arms, with four lobes illustrating the Virgin Mary's life. The remaining two lobes feature armorials, one with the papal keys and tiara, honoring Pope Pius IX (1846–1878). Following a request by Monsignor Jean-Marie Robin, Pius IX granted the crowning of the Black Virgin and Child on 16 May 1857, with the ceremony held on 8 September 1857, during the Nativity of Mary, before a large crowd.

=== Sainte-Jeanne Portal ===
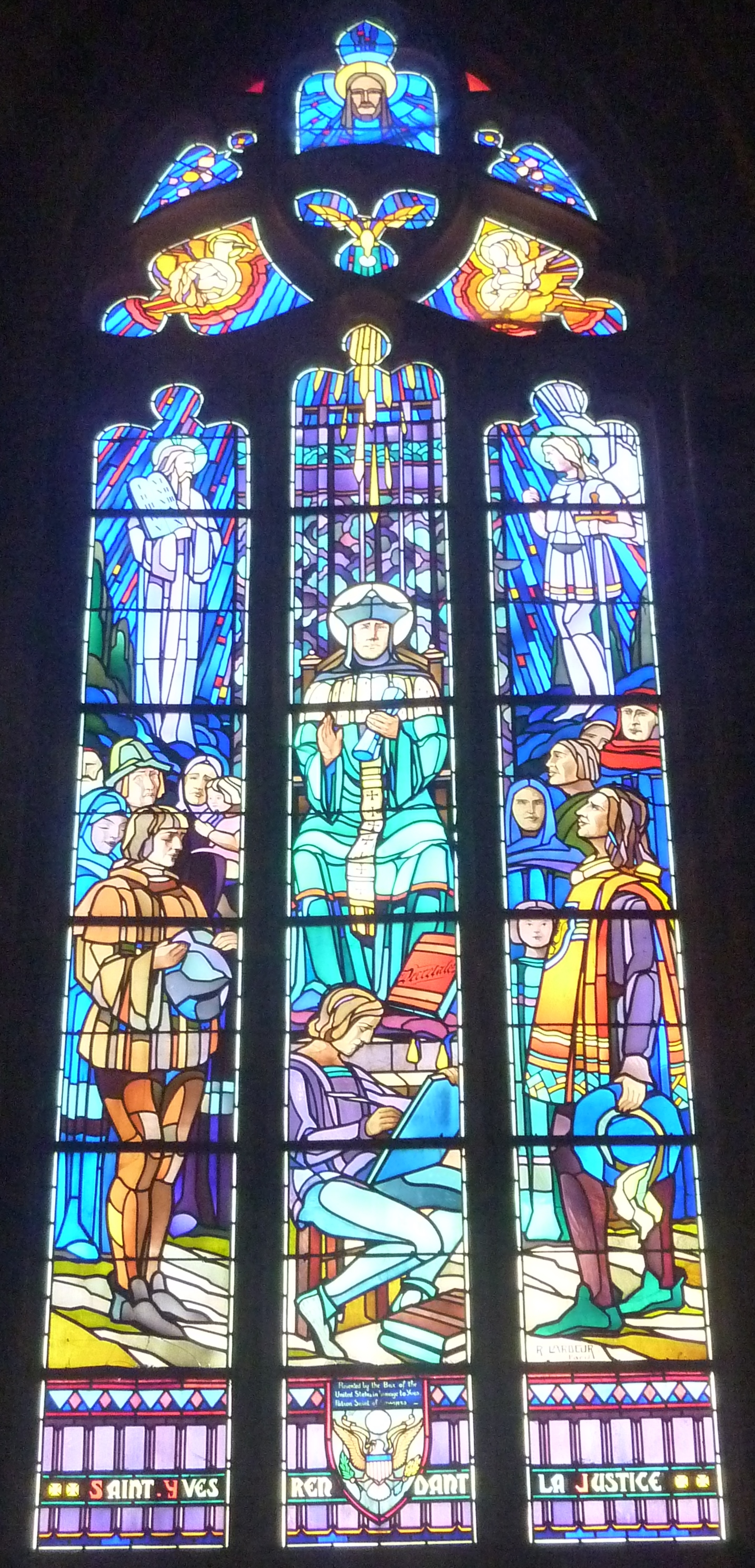
Stained glass of Saint Yves dispensing justice

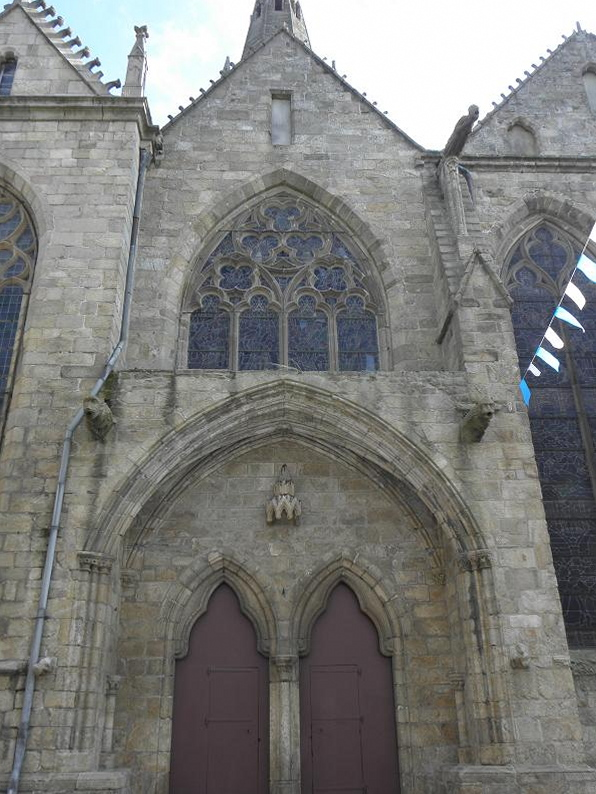
Sainte-Jeanne Portal

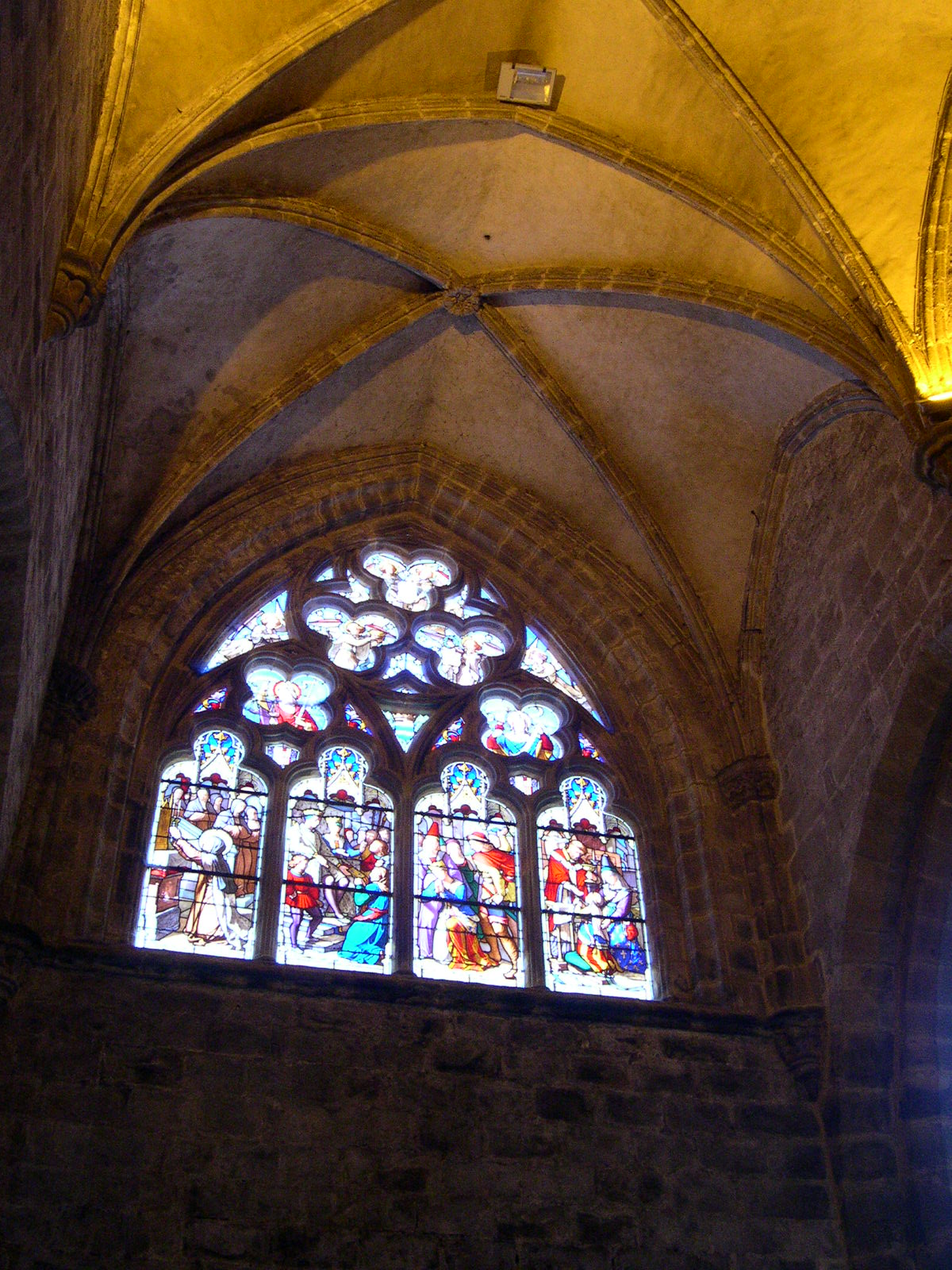
Stained glass above the Sainte-Jeanne Portal

The Sainte-Jeanne Portal, on the northern facade, opens to the north transept. It features two large, pointed-arch doors topped by a larger, similarly arched arcade supported by colonnettes with carved capitals. Flanking the portal are wide benches, known as the "benches of the poor and pilgrims," and four cannon-shaped gargoyles.

A polychrome wooden statue of the Virgin of the Annunciation, holding a Bible and raising her left hand, once stood on the central pillar. Restored by the Beaux-Arts in the 20th century, it was moved to the apse. It is paired with another restored polychrome statue of an angel holding an uninscribed scroll, originally from the western portal, forming the Visitation group. Near the portal, a holy water font bears the name Yves Jégou, and on the western wall, a reliquary cabinet and an oculus allow pilgrims to view the high altar from the Virgin's chapel. The organ was located here before 1865.

Above the portal, an 1857 stained-glass window comprises four vertical panels depicting the life of Duchess Françoise d'Amboise, wife of Peter II of Brittany. The panels, read right to left, show her receiving communion at the court of John V, Duke of Brittany, her suffering due to her husband's jealousy, their ascension to the ducal throne after the 1450 assassination of Gilles de Bretagne, and her entry into the Carmelite Order after Peter's death. Armorials of Guingamp, Brittany, and the ducal couple are included. Two additional northern facade windows from 1873, by master glassmaker Fialex, depict significant events.

The easternmost window commemorates a vow during the Franco-Prussian War of 1870. As Prussian troops advanced after the fall of the Second French Empire, Brittany sought the Virgin's protection. At Monsignor Chatton's initiative, Guingamp residents vowed a stained-glass window. The window's lower scene shows Bretons praying before a preacher, the middle depicts the French defeat at the Battle of Sedan (2 September 1870), and the upper shows the Virgin and Breton bishops interceding with God for a miracle.

The westernmost window illustrates the 1857 crowning of the Virgin by Pope Pius IX. Its three panels depict Pius IX in Rome presenting the crowns to Monsignor Maupied, former parish vicar; the crowns carried in procession by clergy in Guingamp; and the crowning of the Virgin and Child statues.

The portal's name, Sainte-Jeanne, refers to Jeanne de Penthièvre, wife of Charles de Blois. After inheriting the Breton duchy in 1337, she and Charles, supported by Philip VI of France, faced a challenge from John of Montfort, backed by Edward III of England, sparking the Breton War of Succession (1341–1364). After Charles's defeat at the Battle of Auray (1364), Jeanne signed the Treaty of Guérande (1365), ending the war. She later promoted Charles's canonization, nearly succeeding, but Pope Gregory XI halted it to avoid rekindling Franco-English tensions. In the late 19th century, Dom Plaine of Ligugé Abbey reopened the case, leading to Charles's beatification by Pope Pius X on 14 December 1904.

=== Porte au Duc ===
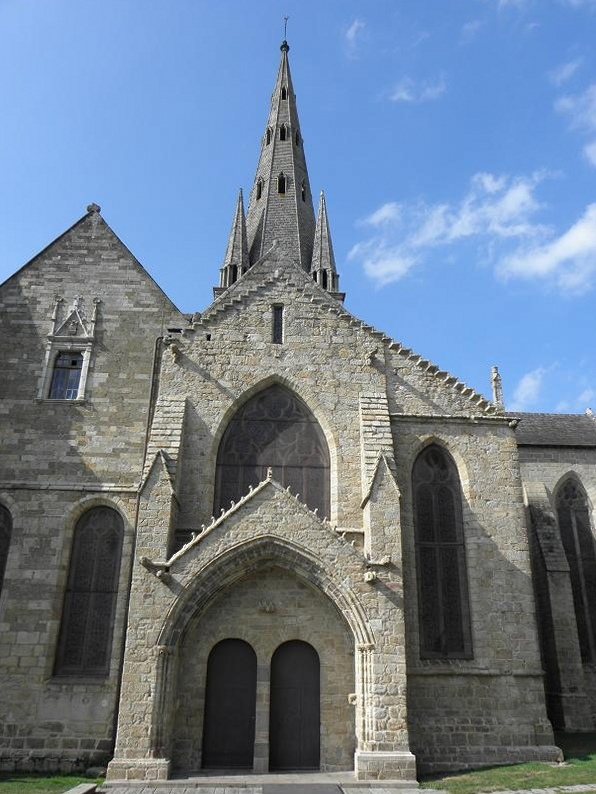
Porte au Duc and southern facade

The Porte au Duc, on the southern facade, was originally reserved for castle nobles. It features two round-arched doorways topped by intersecting, molded pointed arches. Flanking the portal are sculpted buttresses and ten windows: eight pointed arches and two round arches to the west, the latter surmounted by a small window with a pediment bearing Guingamp's arms. Two pilasters with scallop-shell capitals and symbolic motifs (crosses, lozenges) frame the portal. A granite parvis from 1960 precedes it. The modern stained-glass windows, damaged by a 1944 American shell that collapsed part of the Central Tower, were restored in 1967 by the Sainte-Marie de Quintin workshop, depicting the Deposition from the Cross and the Last Supper.

=== Chapel of the Baptismal Fonts ===
Located south of the western portal, this chapel, originally at the Clock Tower, was redesigned in 1850 within the western tower's first tier, in Renaissance style, following Jean Le Moal's plans. Its stained glass is by Didron, and a large southern wall painting by Alphonse Le Hénaff, who also worked at Saint-Eustache, Paris, and Saint-Godard, Rouen, depicts the Baptism of Jesus on the Jordan River's dry banks. The scene shows John the Baptist baptizing Jesus, with men seeking baptism, a Jew pointing to the Holy Spirit's dove, and a family symbolizing baptism's importance. A self-portrait of Le Hénaff is included, and a second painting above shows God the Father on a throne, gesturing to the baptism, with angels at his feet.

The fonts rest on a black square stone. The western wall's first row of five carved heads represents life's three stages, symbolizing the long path to spiritual awakening. The southern row depicts wisdom, the shorter path, with a figure bearing scallop-shell ears and a triangular forehead marking. At the corner, a sculpture of two figures symbolizes the "battle of two natures." The builders' signature, a hand holding a trifoliate bundle, is visible on the western wall's stone bench, its meaning still unclear.

=== Saint-Charles de Blois Chapel ===
This 13th-century chapel, at the Clock Tower's base, is the basilica's oldest part after the Romanesque foundations. Two plaques mark the tombs of canons Yves-Marie Lemen (1919–1940) and Pierre Le Maigat (1950–1964). A lancet window with stained glass features the arms of the Châtillon de France family, honoring Charles de Blois. His body, however, is not here but at the Cordeliers convent, where he was buried per his wishes after the Battle of Auray (1364). Charles supported Guingamp's shrine to the Cordeliers, contributing to the sacristy and high altar. His 1371 canonization was driven by miracles and popular devotion, supported by Jeanne de Penthièvre, but opposed by John IV of England and halted by Pope Gregory XI. In the late 19th century, Dom Plaine's efforts led to his beatification by Pope Pius X on 14 December 1904.

=== Chapel of the Virgin ===
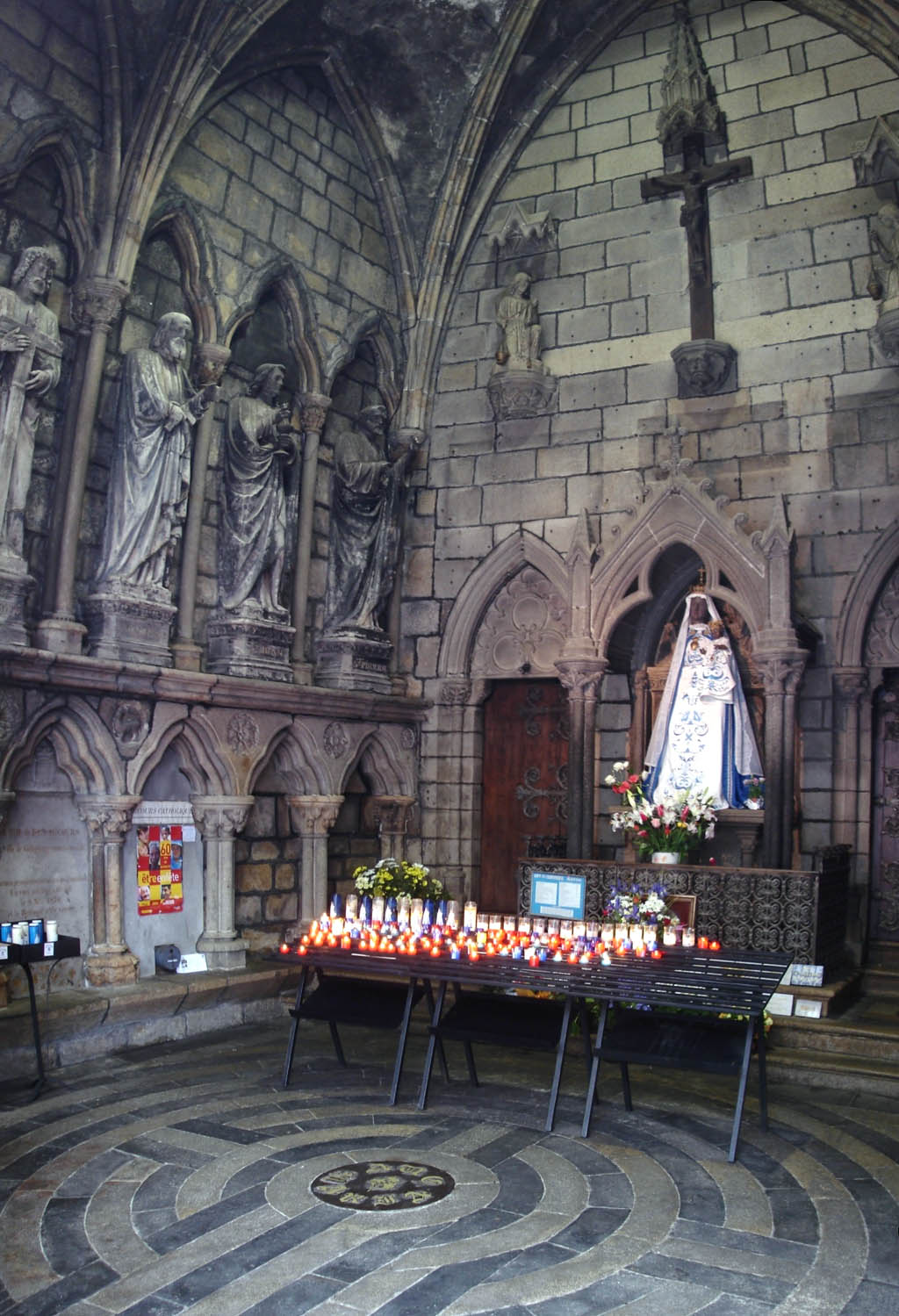
Interior of the Virgin’s Chapel

Located on the northern side, this chapel is accessed via a wrought-iron portal divided by a central pillar, topped by Didron's 1857 stained-glass rose with six lobes and two quatrefoil circles. The window's design mirrors that of the Notre-Dame Portal, with the N, D, and A initials, blue and purple angels, the Virgin and Child's crowning, Brittany's arms, and papal symbols for Pope Pius IX. The 1650 regional pilgrimage spurred the cult of Notre-Dame-de-Bon-Secours, necessitating the oratory's expansion. The tuffeau retable, by Olivier Martinet (1670), supports the Black Virgin statue, possibly from Marseille, holding the Child. The processional Virgin statue is inside the basilica. Crowns, crafted by Hippolyte-Paul Desury in 1855, were placed in 1857. The granite Kersanton altar and baldachin (1854) feature a pedestal with a man's face, flanked by Caen stone angels burning incense. Two 14th-century oak doors connect to the church.

A bicolor granite labyrinth (1854) symbolizes the spiritual journey, with "ave maria" inscribed in yellow at its center. A 15th-century chest, once at the altar's base, symbolized inner treasure but was looted during the Revolution and now serves as a collection box near the Flat Tower's staircase. Twelve niches on the porch hold large statues of the Twelve Apostles, sculpted by M. Ogé (1854–1860). A plaque on the eastern wall commemorates the 1870 Franco-Prussian War, noting Brittany's salvation after a vow by Monsignor Chatton. Three western wall plaques mark the 1892 mission, an 1889 thanksgiving, and an 1869 tribute to the Virgin and Saint Joseph. A large plaque between the chapel's doors records the basilica's elevation to minor basilica by Pope Leo XIII, featuring his arms, those of Bishop Pierre Marie Frédéric Fallières, Guingamp, Brittany, Châtillon de France, and the ducal couple Peter II of Brittany and Françoise d'Amboise. The Frairie Blanche's triple-cord symbol and motto, "a triple bond is hard to break," adorn the panel. During the Revolution, the porch became a guardhouse, and a crypt, Notre-Dame-Sous-Terre, was destroyed in 1792. The Virgin statue was mutilated, its head recovered in 1805, bust in 1846, and Child statue in 1854, culminating in the 1857 crowning.

=== Chapel of the Deceased ===
Formerly the Trinity or Saint-Denis Denis Chapel, this north aisle chapel features a Kersanton granite altar (1857) designed by Darcel and sculpted by Hernot, with quatrefoil ornamentation and black marble steps inscribed "Labbe à St-Brieuc." A statue of Sainte-Jeanne, inscribed "Protect the world's children," sits above a tabernacle with a pelican feeding its young, symbolizing paternal love. The altar replaced a gilded wooden structure, which succeeded the Gouicquet altar (1507), granted to Bertrand Gouicquet and Isabelle Chéro. A statue of Rolland Gouicquet, a Breton defender against Charles VIII of France, once stood here. A lost painting by Alphonse Le Hénaff depicted the resurrection in the Valley of Josaphat. Fragments of a Passion of Christ stained-glass window remain, alongside windows named for Saint-Loup and Saint Susanna.

=== Saint-Jacques Chapel ===
Near the Porte au Duc, this south aisle chapel, dedicated to spirituality, was the meeting place for the town community until 1621 and the Cordeliers' confraternity. A mascaron with a papyrus bears the motto: "quid quid agas sapienter agas et respice finem" ("whatever you do, do wisely and consider the end"). The Cordeliers, established in 1283 under John II, Duke of Brittany, thrived under Charles de Blois, moving to Grâces in 1581 after a fire. A plaque honors Canon G. Thomas (parish priest, 1941–1960). A statuette of Saint James, with a scallop-shell hat and pilgrim's staff, faces east. The organ, restored in 1647, 1865, and 1974, now has 39 stops across three manuals and a 32-note pedalboard.

=== Treasury Chapel ===
South of the Porte au Duc, this chapel houses the tomb of Pierre Morel, archdeacon of Tréguier (1385–1401). Morel completed the Tréguier Cathedral, built naval and military projects, and established libraries for the Cordeliers and the basilica. His damaged columbarium shows him in pontifical vestments, with Saint Tugdual and two women presenting him to the Virgin and Child. His arms (silver with a red leopard) are faintly visible. The chapel's rounded, sculpted wainscot ceiling and adjacent 1570 secretariat enhance its historical significance.

=== Holy Sacrament Chapel ===
In the eastern south aisle, this chapel, once dedicated to the Virgin, received a white marble altar in 1860, destroyed in 1944 by a shell. Restored, it now features a Merovingian tabernacle with the Mystical Lamb and cross, housing consecrated hosts.

=== Nave ===
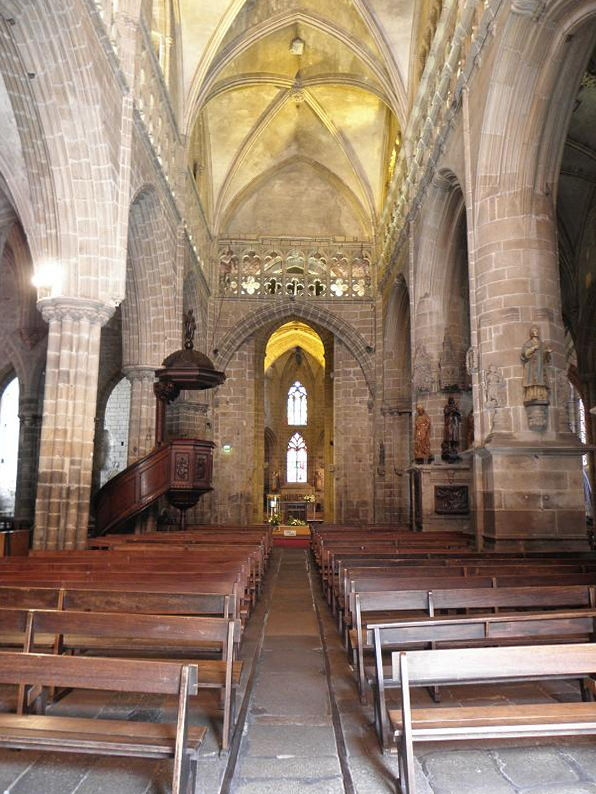
The nave.

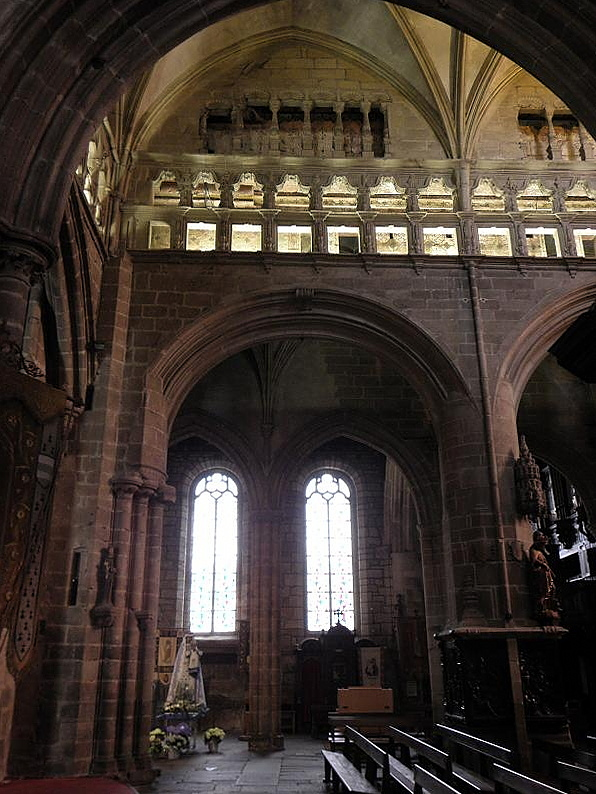
Gothic north elevation.

The northern nave, 13th-century Gothic, has four bays with pointed arches supported by eight colonnettes with foliage capitals. Its triforium features elongated rectangles with trilobed and rosette motifs. The southern nave, 15th–16th-century Renaissance, has four bays with molded pointed arches on cylindrical pillars with square bases. Its triforium, divided by a balustrade on fluted colonnettes, supports a blind gallery with scallop-shell motifs. Statues include Saint Peter on the first Renaissance pillar, Saint Leonard on the third with the four cardinal virtues, and Joan of Arc, Margaret of Antioch, and Catherine of Alexandria on the southwestern transept pillar, with 1918 wooden panels by Le Goff depicting Joan of Arc's life. The central nave's vaults, originally wooden, were rebuilt in Caen limestone in 1865, with a 19th-century wooden pulpit.

=== Transept Crossing ===
Romanesque full arches from the 12th-century structure are encased in later masonry. Rectangular pillars with engaged columns in four directions support the crossing tower's spire, with a western staircase accessing the vaults and triforium. Expressive carved heads, including a pensive man, a skeptical woman, and a ram, adorn the pillars.

=== Choir ===
The choir, surrounded by four large pillars with enigmatic carved heads, once housed an armorial tomb of the Le Brun family, with a 1656 inscription for governor Jacques Le Brun. A small statue on the southwestern pillar depicts Saint Joseph in a robe, holding a fleur-de-lis and a hatchet. Four 13th-century pillars, too slender for the choir vault, were reinforced with flying buttresses in the 15th century. A vault beneath the choir holds notable figures, including Jean des Brosses (d. 1565), his wife Dame Martigues (deceased in 1613), Sébastien du Luxembourg (deceased in 1569), and his daughter Marie, transferred from the Cordeliers convent after a fire.

=== Ambulatory ===
The ambulatory's flamboyant Gothic windows feature flame-like lancets. Sculpted foliage capitals, corbelled supports, and statues adorn the space. Two columbariums include Monsignor Galerne's (parish priest, 1871–1882) with a wooden sculpture above his epitaph, and Monsignor Jean-Marie Robin's, with a Latin inscription noting his 20-year tenure and death in 1865. A southern memorial honors World War I fighters, and Rolland de Coatgourheden's columbarium, possibly his nephew's, depicts him in armor, presented by Charles de Blois to the Virgin and Child, with his arms and those of the Du Parc de Locmaria.

=== Apse ===
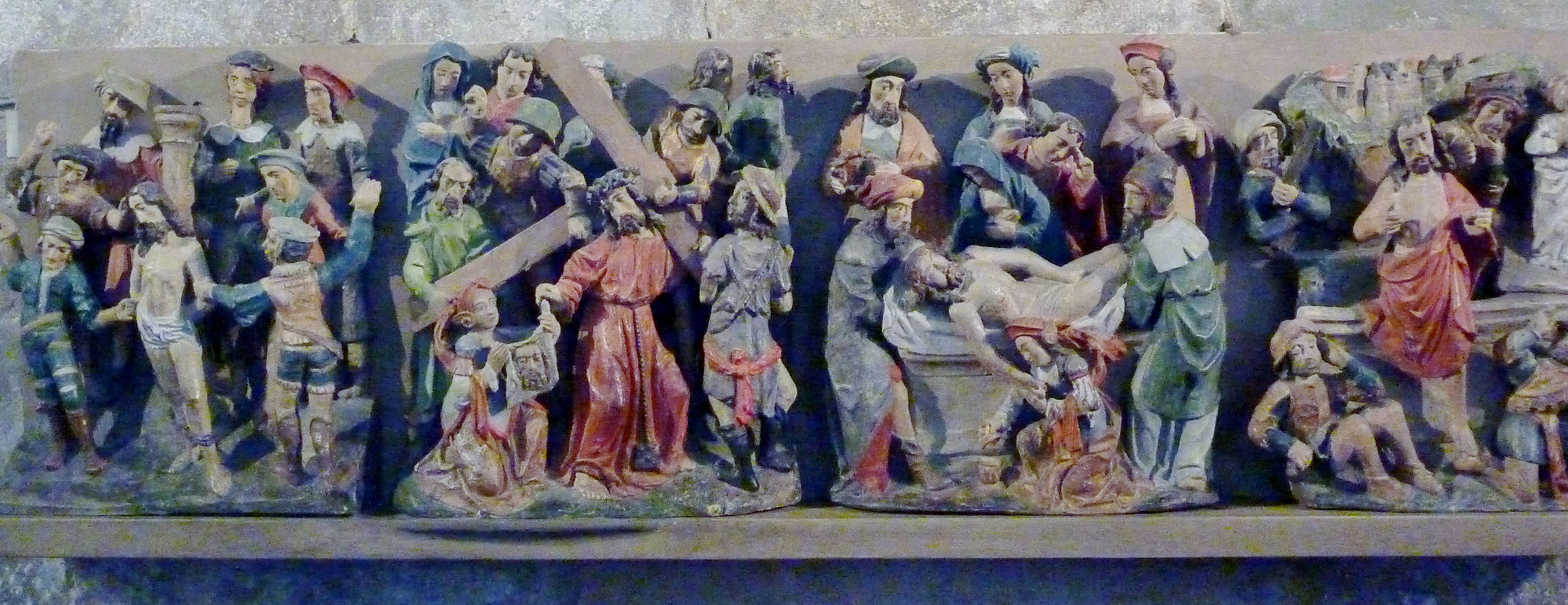
Polychrome wooden bas-relief of Passion of Christ

The 15th-century apse, originally flat, replaced three small altars dedicated to John the Baptist, Notre-Dame de Pitié, and Saint Joseph. A polychrome wooden bas-relief from the destroyed Pors An Quen chapel (1900) depicts the Passion of Christ. Two statues, the Virgin of the Annunciation and an angel, form the Visitation group. The northern absidiole has statues of Saint Elizabeth, an angel, John the Evangelist, and Saint Joachim, with a red-and-yellow parasol (restored 2000) and a wooden belfry bearing the basilica's arms, granted in 1899. The southern absidiole features statues of Gabriel, Saint Bernard of Clairvaux, Saint Joseph ("patron of workers"), and the "model of mothers." Eight restored stained-glass windows (1846–1876) by Didron, Fialeix, and Laurent Gzell depict noble families' arms, the Virgin's life, Francis of Assisi, and the Carmelite Order.

=== Chevet ===
The chevet, originally flat with three windows, became polygonal (1462–1484) after a donation by Dom Jehan Le Croez. Its stone ceiling contrasts with the apse's brick, and a flamboyant balustrade lines the roof base.

=== Organ ===
The organ, in the Saint-Jacques Chapel, was damaged in 1535, restored in 1647 with a new buffet, and moved in 1865 to its current location, built by M. Loret of Dendermonde. Restored in 1974 by Renaud of Nantes, it has 39 stops across three manuals and a 32-note pedalboard.

=== Sacristy ===
Adjoining the chevet's northern buttresses, the sacristy, founded by Charles de Blois in the 14th century, has a 15th-century Gothic door and a 19th-century extension. Used as a prison during the Revolution, it retains a fine eastern window.

=== Presbytery ===
Southwest of the western portal, the presbytery, purchased in 1403 by Yves Trouzéon, was rebuilt in 1720 after a 12-year campaign by rector Nicolas, yielding its elegant facade.

=== Pardon ===
In 1844, Pitre-Chevalier noted that the Notre-Dame-de-Bon-Secours pardon granted 500 days of indulgence for spending a night on bare ground, though he remarked that the devotion sometimes turned into revelry.

== See also ==
- Black Madonna
- Marian devotions

== Bibliography ==
- Couffon, René (1938). "Répertoire des églises et chapelles du diocèse de Saint-Brieuc et Tréguier - Guingamp" [Directory of Churches and Chapels of the Diocese of Saint-Brieuc and Tréguier - Guingamp]. Société d'émulation des Côtes-du-Nord (in French). 70: 135–142.
- Merlet, François (1950). "Notre-Dame de Guingamp" [Our Lady of Guingamp]. Congrès archéologique de France, 107th session, Saint-Brieuc, 1949 (in French). 107. Société française d'archéologie: 236–256.
- Pérouse de Montclos, Jean-Marie (2002). Guide du patrimoine - Bretagne [Heritage Guide - Brittany] (in French). Paris: humidum. Éditions du Patrimoine. ISBN 9782858227280.
- Bonnet, Philippe; Rioult, Jean-Jacques (2010). Bretagne gothique [Gothic Brittany] (in French). Paris: Éditions Picard. pp. 193–203. ISBN 978-2708408838.
- Gallet, Yves (2017). "Guingamp, église Notre-Dame" [Guingamp, Notre-Dame Church]. Congrès archéologique de France, 173rd session, Monuments des Côtes-d'Armor, « le Beau Moyen Âge » 2015 (in French). Société française d'archéologie: 235–249.
