= Canton of Guingamp =

Coordinates: 48.56°N 3.15°W

The canton of Guingamp is an administrative division of the Côtes-d'Armor department, northwestern France. Its borders were modified at the French canton reorganisation which came into effect in March 2015. Its seat is in Guingamp.

It consists of the following communes:

1. Goudelin
2. Grâces
3. Guingamp
4. Le Merzer
5. Pabu
6. Plouisy
7. Ploumagoar
8. Pommerit-le-Vicomte
9. Saint-Agathon
