= Le Merzer =

Le Merzer Ar Merzher
- Commune
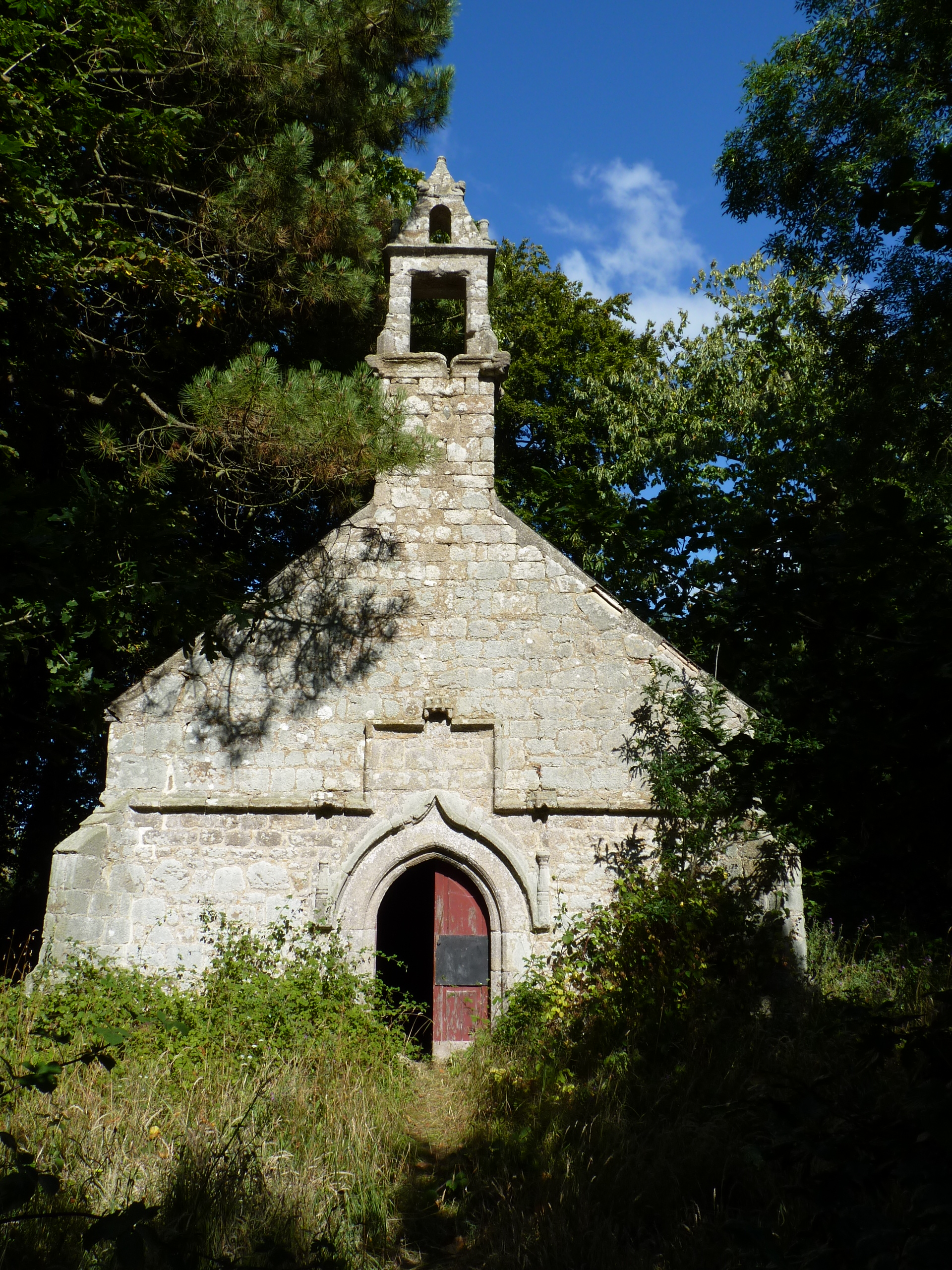
- The chapel of Saint-Yves, in Le Merzer
- Location of Le Merzer
- Location within France Location within Brittany
- Coordinates: 48°34′36″N 3°04′00″W
- Country: France
- Region: Brittany
- Department: Côtes-d'Armor
- Arrondissement: Guingamp
- Canton: Guingamp

Government
  - Mayor (2020–2026): Laurence Corson
- Area^{1}: 12.63 km^{2} (4.88 sq mi)
- Highest elevation: 137 m (449 ft)
- Lowest elevation: 69 m (226 ft)
- Population (2023): 986
  - Density: 78.1/km^{2} (202/sq mi)
- Time zone: UTC+01:00 (CET)
  - Summer (DST): UTC+02:00 (CEST)
- INSEE/Postal code: 22150 /22200
- ^{1} French Land Register data, which excludes lakes, ponds, glaciers > 1 km^{2} (0.386 sq mi or 247 acres) and river estuaries.

Le Merzer (French pronunciation: [lə mɛʁzɛʁ]; Breton: Ar Merzher) is a commune in the Côtes-d'Armor department of Brittany in northwestern France.

== Population ==
Historical population
| Year | Pop. | ±% p.a. |
|---|---|---|
| 1968 | 608 | — |
| 1975 | 540 | −1.68% |
| 1982 | 700 | +3.78% |
| 1990 | 715 | +0.27% |
| 1999 | 799 | +1.24% |
| 2007 | 836 | +0.57% |
| 2012 | 964 | +2.89% |
| 2017 | 959 | −0.10% |
| 2023 | 986 | +0.46% |
Source: INSEE

Inhabitants of Le Merzer are called merzeriens in French.

== See also ==
- Communes of the Côtes-d'Armor department
