= Pommerit-le-Vicomte =

Pommerit-le-Vicomte Pañvrid-ar-Beskont
- Commune
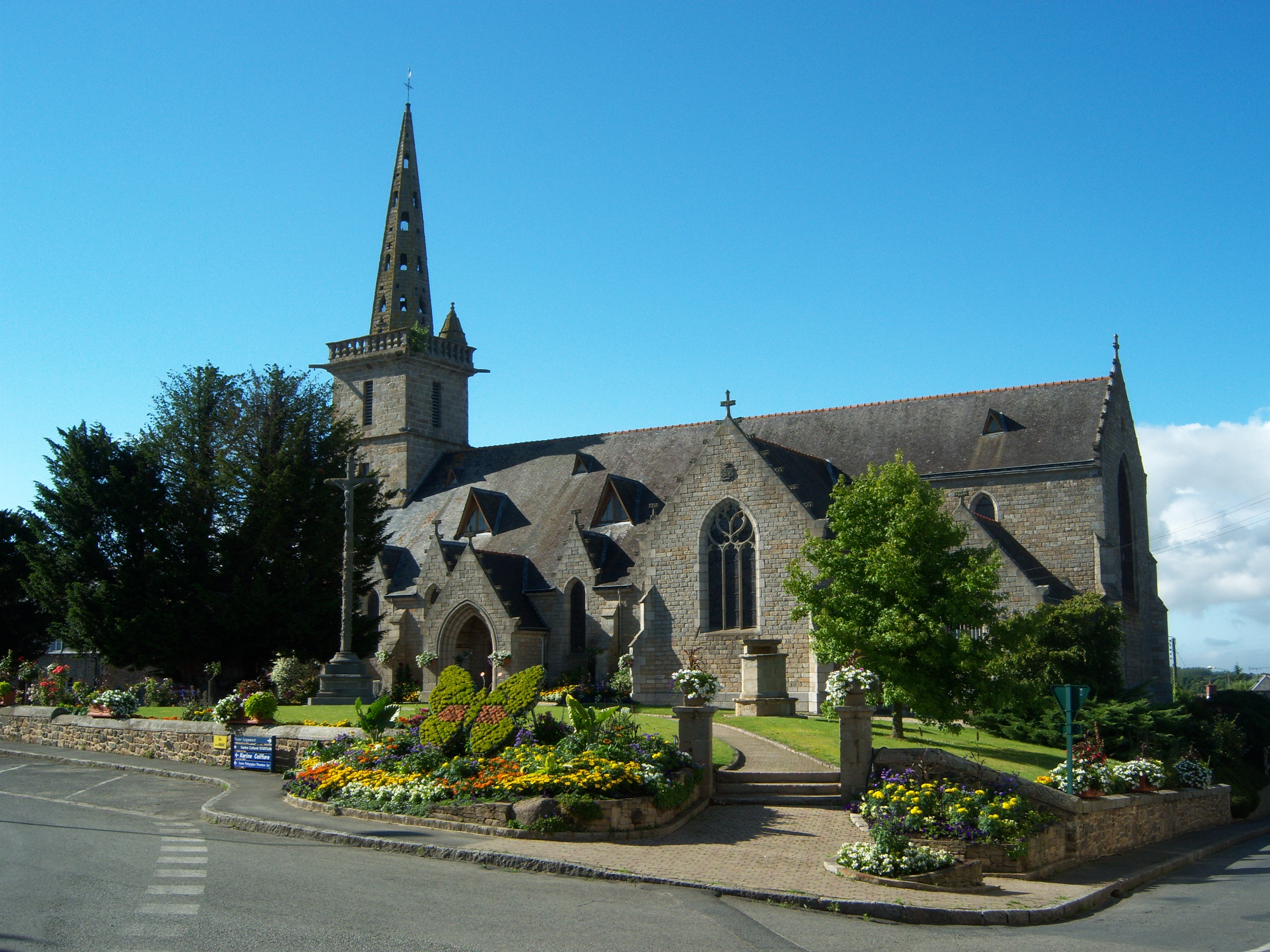
- The church of Pommerit-le-Vicomte
- Location of Pommerit-le-Vicomte
- Location within France Location within Brittany
- Coordinates: 48°37′12″N 3°05′14″W
- Country: France
- Region: Brittany
- Department: Côtes-d'Armor
- Arrondissement: Guingamp
- Canton: Guingamp
- Intercommunality: Leff Armor Communauté

Government
  - Mayor (2020–2026): Florence Le Saint
- Area^{1}: 33.03 km^{2} (12.75 sq mi)
- Highest elevation: 119 m (390 ft)
- Lowest elevation: 34 m (112 ft)
- Population (2023): 1,809
  - Density: 54.77/km^{2} (141.8/sq mi)
- Time zone: UTC+01:00 (CET)
  - Summer (DST): UTC+02:00 (CEST)
- INSEE/Postal code: 22248 /22200
- ^{1} French Land Register data, which excludes lakes, ponds, glaciers > 1 km^{2} (0.386 sq mi or 247 acres) and river estuaries.

Pommerit-le-Vicomte (French pronunciation: [pɔmʁit lə vikɔ̃t]; Breton: Pañvrid-ar-Beskont) is a commune in the Côtes-d'Armor department of Brittany in northwestern France.

== International relations ==
The town is twinned with Millstreet, Co. Cork, Ireland.

== Population ==
Historical population
Year	Pop.	±% p.a.
1968	1,724	—
1975	1,631	−0.79%
1982	1,713	+0.70%
1990	1,690	−0.17%
1999	1,728	+0.25%
2007	1,853	+0.88%
2012	1,856	+0.03%
2017	1,760	−1.06%
2023	1,809	+0.46%
Source: INSEE

Inhabitants of Pommerit-le-Vicomte are called pommeritains in French.

== See also ==
- Communes of the Côtes-d'Armor department
