= Pabu =

Pabu Pabu (Breton)
- Commune
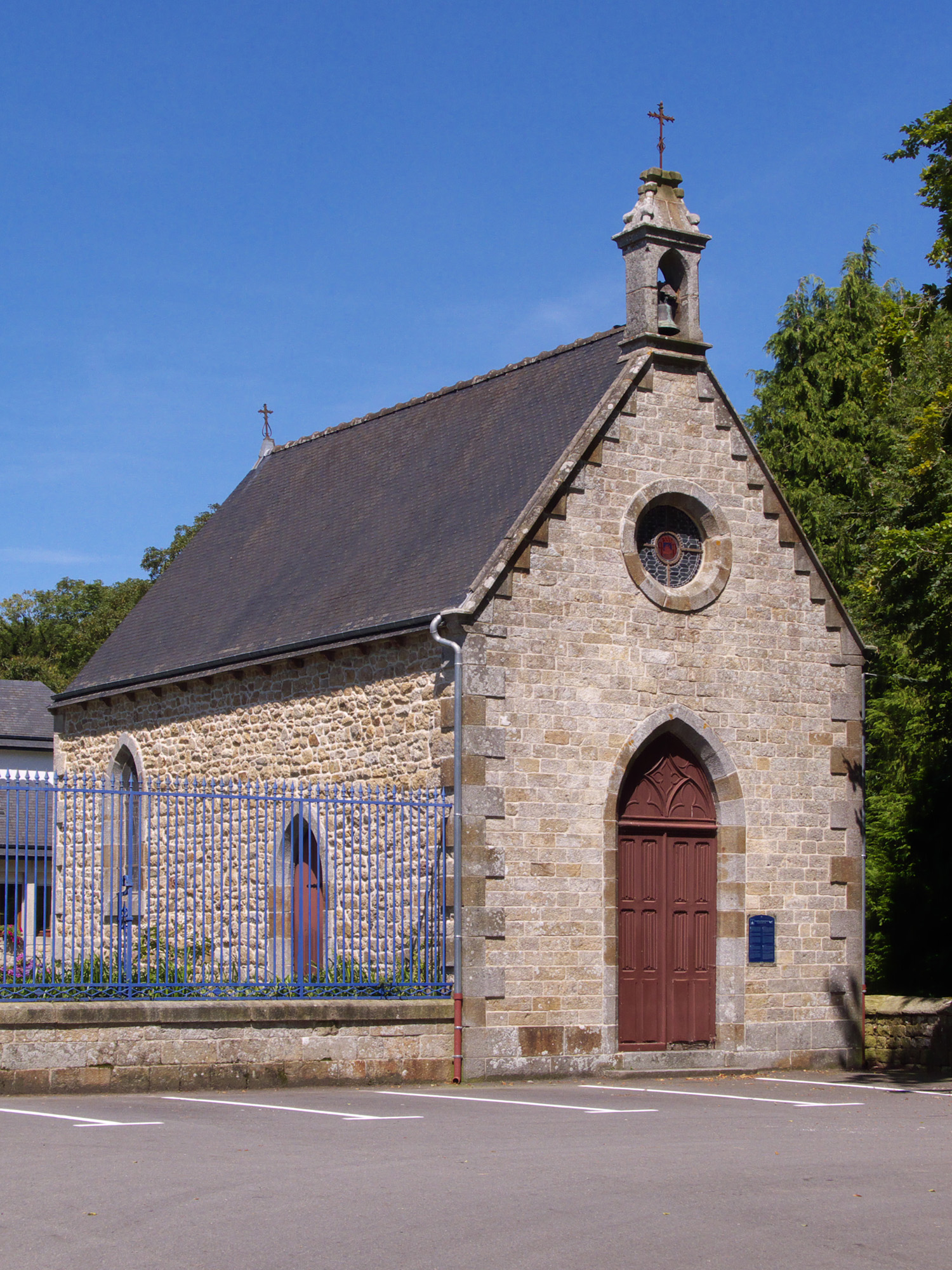
- Chapel of Saint-Loup in Pabu
- Location of Pabu
- Location within France Location within Brittany
- Coordinates: 48°35′18″N 3°08′04″W
- Country: France
- Region: Brittany
- Department: Côtes-d'Armor
- Arrondissement: Guingamp
- Canton: Guingamp
- Intercommunality: Guingamp-Paimpol Agglomération

Government
  - Mayor (2020–2026): Pierre Salliou
- Area^{1}: 7.83 km^{2} (3.02 sq mi)
- Highest elevation: 137 m (449 ft)
- Lowest elevation: 50 m (160 ft)
- Population (2023): 2,771
  - Density: 354/km^{2} (917/sq mi)
- Time zone: UTC+01:00 (CET)
  - Summer (DST): UTC+02:00 (CEST)
- INSEE/Postal code: 22161 /22200
- ^{1} French Land Register data, which excludes lakes, ponds, glaciers > 1 km^{2} (0.386 sq mi or 247 acres) and river estuaries.

Pabu (French pronunciation: [paby]; Breton: Pabu) is a commune in the Côtes-d'Armor department of Brittany in northwestern France.

== Population ==
Inhabitants of Pabu are called pabuais in French.

Historical population
Year	Pop.	±% p.a.
1968	1,739	—
1975	2,452	+5.03%
1982	2,871	+2.28%
1990	2,772	−0.44%
1999	2,675	−0.39%
2007	2,782	+0.49%
2012	2,799	+0.12%
2017	2,760	−0.28%
2023	2,771	+0.07%
Source: INSEE

== Breton language ==
In 2008, 32.46% of primary school children attended bilingual schools.

== See also ==
- Communes of the Côtes-d'Armor department
