= Goudelin =

Goudelin Goudelin
- Commune
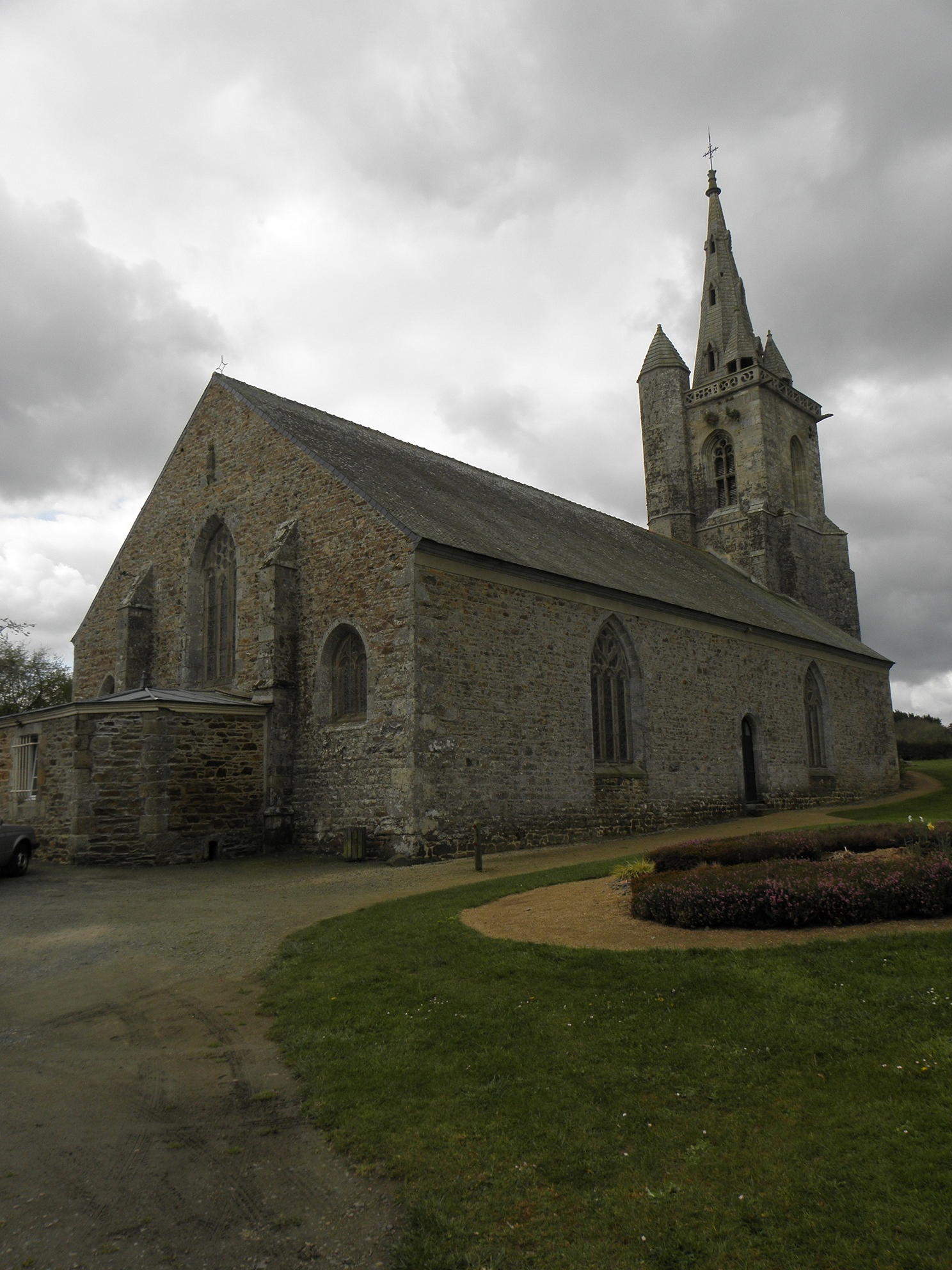
- The chapel of Notre-Dame-de-l'Isle

- Coat of arms
- Location of Goudelin
- Location within France Location within Brittany
- Coordinates: 48°36′14″N 3°00′57″W
- Country: France
- Region: Brittany
- Department: Côtes-d'Armor
- Arrondissement: Guingamp
- Canton: Guingamp
- Intercommunality: Leff Armor Communauté

Government
  - Mayor (2020–2026): Laurent Le Faucheur
- Area^{1}: 22.98 km^{2} (8.87 sq mi)
- Highest elevation: 113 m (371 ft)
- Lowest elevation: 37 m (121 ft)
- Population (2023): 1,751
  - Density: 76.20/km^{2} (197.3/sq mi)
- Time zone: UTC+01:00 (CET)
  - Summer (DST): UTC+02:00 (CEST)
- INSEE/Postal code: 22065 /22290
- ^{1} French Land Register data, which excludes lakes, ponds, glaciers > 1 km^{2} (0.386 sq mi or 247 acres) and river estuaries.

Goudelin (French pronunciation: [ɡudlɛ̃]; Breton: Goudelin) is a commune in the Côtes-d'Armor department of Brittany in northwestern France.

== Population ==
Historical population
Year	Pop.	±% p.a.
1968	1,243	—
1975	1,186	−0.67%
1982	1,267	+0.95%
1990	1,258	−0.09%
1999	1,357	+0.85%
2007	1,587	+1.98%
2012	1,679	+1.13%
2017	1,746	+0.79%
2023	1,751	+0.05%
Source: INSEE

Inhabitants of Goudelin are called Goudelinais in French.

== See also ==
- Communes of the Côtes-d'Armor department
