= Plouisy =

Plouisy Plouizi
- Commune
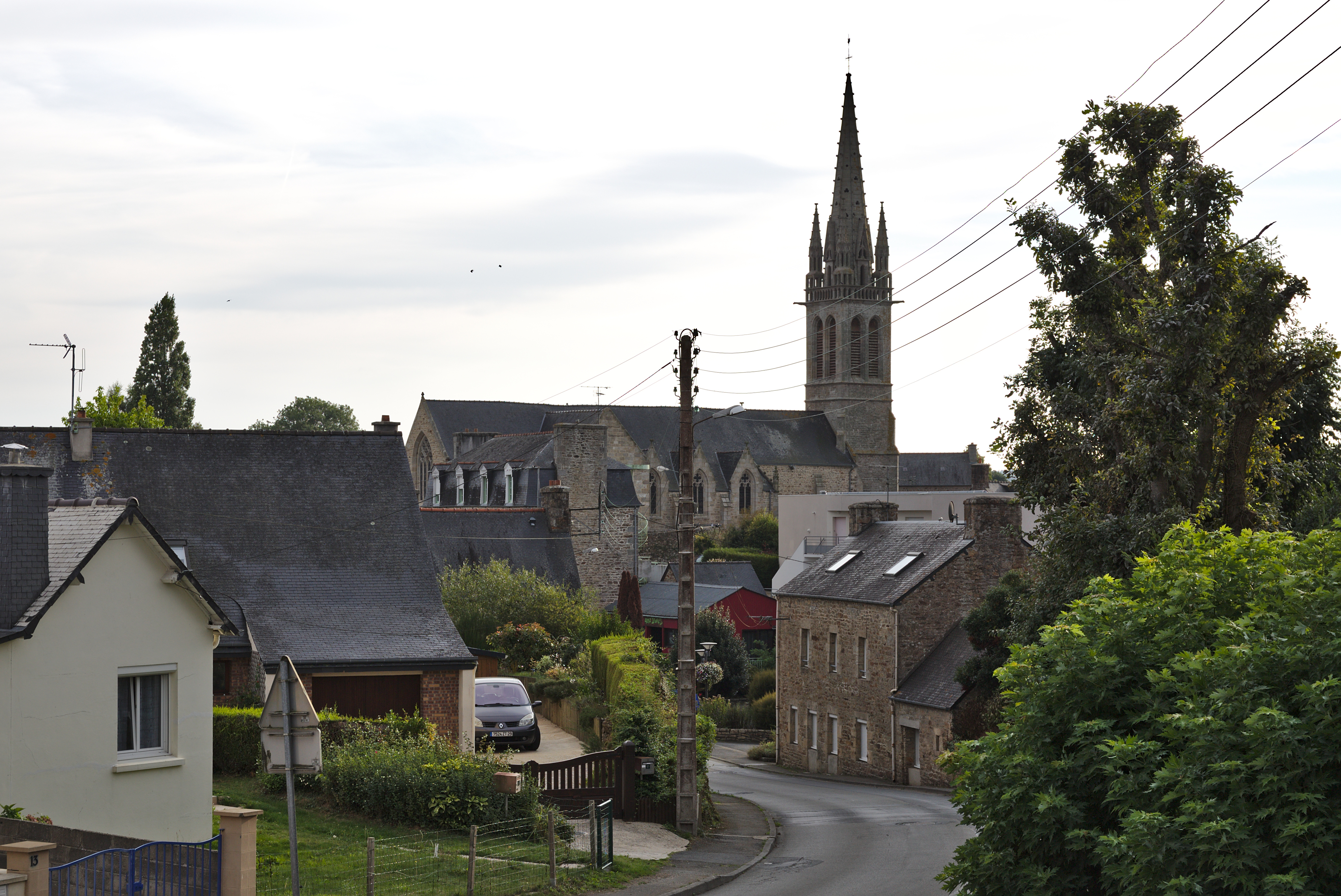
- The centre of Plouisy
- Location of Plouisy
- Location within France Location within Brittany
- Coordinates: 48°34′42″N 3°10′57″W
- Country: France
- Region: Brittany
- Department: Côtes-d'Armor
- Arrondissement: Guingamp
- Canton: Guingamp
- Intercommunality: Guingamp-Paimpol Agglomération

Government
  - Mayor (2020–2026): Rémy Guillou
- Area^{1}: 23.63 km^{2} (9.12 sq mi)
- Highest elevation: 195 m (640 ft)
- Lowest elevation: 55 m (180 ft)
- Population (2023): 2,007
  - Density: 84.93/km^{2} (220.0/sq mi)
- Time zone: UTC+01:00 (CET)
  - Summer (DST): UTC+02:00 (CEST)
- INSEE/Postal code: 22223 /22200
- ^{1} French Land Register data, which excludes lakes, ponds, glaciers > 1 km^{2} (0.386 sq mi or 247 acres) and river estuaries.

Plouisy (French pronunciation: [pluizi]; Breton: Plouizi) is a commune in the Côtes-d'Armor department of Brittany in north-western France. Plouisy is 407 kilometres from Paris.

== Geography ==
=== Climate ===
Plouisy has an oceanic climate (Köppen climate classification Cfb). The average annual temperature in Plouisy is 11.0 °C (51.8 °F). The average annual rainfall is 950.2 mm (37.41 in) with December as the wettest month. The temperatures are highest on average in August, at around 17.1 °C (62.8 °F), and lowest in January, at around 5.8 °C (42.4 °F). The highest temperature ever recorded in Plouisy was 38.6 °C (101.5 °F) on 9 August 2003; the coldest temperature ever recorded was −13.5 °C (7.7 °F) on 17 January 1985.

Climate data for Plouisy (1981–2010 averages, extremes 1971−2013)
Month	Jan	Feb	Mar	Apr	May	Jun	Jul	Aug	Sep	Oct	Nov	Dec	Year
Record high °C (°F)	16.2 (61.2)	20.8 (69.4)	24.6 (76.3)	26.8 (80.2)	31.0 (87.8)	33.7 (92.7)	35.4 (95.7)	38.6 (101.5)	31.3 (88.3)	29.5 (85.1)	22.1 (71.8)	17.0 (62.6)	38.6 (101.5)
Mean daily maximum °C (°F)	9.0 (48.2)	9.4 (48.9)	11.9 (53.4)	13.9 (57.0)	17.5 (63.5)	20.6 (69.1)	22.5 (72.5)	22.7 (72.9)	20.4 (68.7)	16.2 (61.2)	12.1 (53.8)	9.4 (48.9)	15.5 (59.9)
Daily mean °C (°F)	5.8 (42.4)	5.8 (42.4)	7.8 (46.0)	9.1 (48.4)	12.4 (54.3)	15.1 (59.2)	17.1 (62.8)	17.1 (62.8)	15.0 (59.0)	12.0 (53.6)	8.5 (47.3)	6.2 (43.2)	11.0 (51.8)
Mean daily minimum °C (°F)	2.7 (36.9)	2.3 (36.1)	3.7 (38.7)	4.3 (39.7)	7.2 (45.0)	9.7 (49.5)	11.7 (53.1)	11.6 (52.9)	9.7 (49.5)	7.8 (46.0)	4.8 (40.6)	3.0 (37.4)	6.6 (43.9)
Record low °C (°F)	−13.5 (7.7)	−12.5 (9.5)	−7.8 (18.0)	−5.1 (22.8)	−3.0 (26.6)	0.4 (32.7)	3.0 (37.4)	2.4 (36.3)	−0.6 (30.9)	−5.6 (21.9)	−6.8 (19.8)	−9.5 (14.9)	−13.5 (7.7)
Average precipitation mm (inches)	109.1 (4.30)	89.9 (3.54)	78.0 (3.07)	76.1 (3.00)	72.9 (2.87)	49.6 (1.95)	45.1 (1.78)	48.0 (1.89)	63.9 (2.52)	98.7 (3.89)	104.7 (4.12)	114.2 (4.50)	950.2 (37.41)
Average precipitation days (≥ 1.0 mm)	16.0	13.8	13.2	12.6	11.1	7.7	8.9	8.7	9.7	14.7	15.3	15.9	147.5
Source: Meteociel

== Population ==
Historical population
Year	Pop.	±% p.a.
1968	1,496	—
1975	1,417	−0.77%
1982	1,595	+1.70%
1990	1,730	+1.02%
1999	1,756	+0.17%
2007	1,917	+1.10%
2012	1,975	+0.60%
2017	1,980	+0.05%
2023	2,007	+0.23%
Source: INSEE

Inhabitants of Plouisy are called plouisyens in French.

== See also ==
- Communes of the Côtes-d'Armor department
