= Ploumagoar =

- Commune
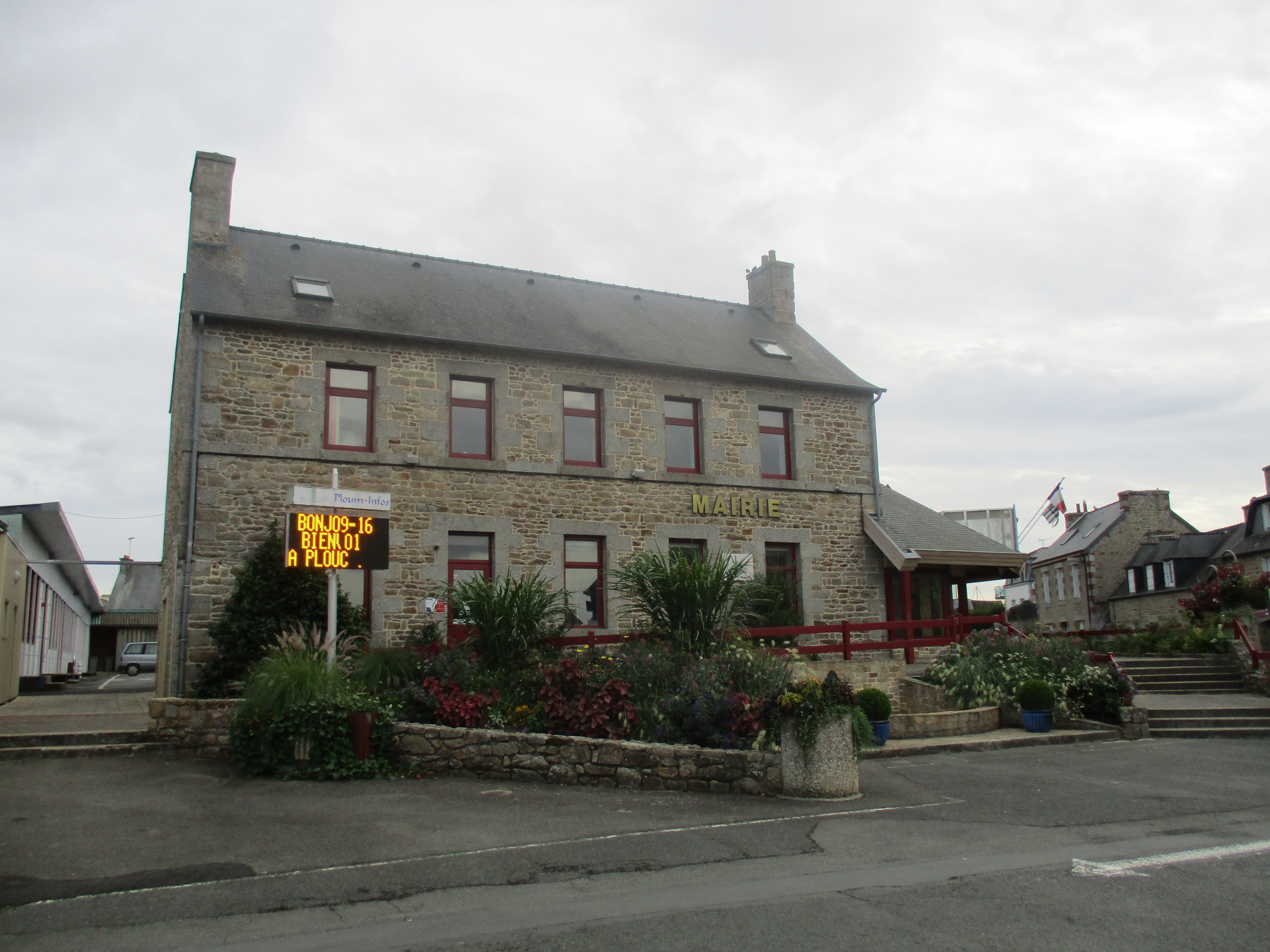
- The town hall of Ploumagoar
- Location of Ploumagoar
- Location within France Location within Brittany
- Coordinates: 48°32′45″N 3°07′53″W
- Country: France
- Region: Brittany
- Department: Côtes-d'Armor
- Arrondissement: Guingamp
- Canton: Guingamp
- Intercommunality: Guingamp-Paimpol Agglomération

Government
  - Mayor (2020–2026): Yannick Echevest
- Area^{1}: 32.07 km^{2} (12.38 sq mi)
- Highest elevation: 202 m (663 ft)
- Lowest elevation: 67 m (220 ft)
- Population (2023): 5,414
  - Density: 168.8/km^{2} (437.2/sq mi)
- Time zone: UTC+01:00 (CET)
  - Summer (DST): UTC+02:00 (CEST)
- INSEE/Postal code: 22225 /22970
- ^{1} French Land Register data, which excludes lakes, ponds, glaciers > 1 km^{2} (0.386 sq mi or 247 acres) and river estuaries.

Ploumagoar (French pronunciation: [plumaɡwaʁ]; Breton: Plouvagor) is a commune in the Côtes-d'Armor department of Brittany in northwestern France.

== Population ==
Inhabitants of Ploumagoar are called ploumagoariens in French.

Historical population

| Year | Pop. | ±% p.a. |
|---|---|---|
| 1793 | 819 | — |
| 1800 | 1,769 | +11.63% |
| 1806 | 1,934 | +1.50% |
| 1821 | 2,035 | +0.34% |
| 1831 | 2,055 | +0.10% |
| 1836 | 2,004 | −0.50% |
| 1841 | 2,101 | +0.95% |
| 1846 | 2,189 | +0.82% |
| 1851 | 2,151 | −0.35% |
| 1856 | 2,096 | −0.52% |
| 1861 | 2,134 | +0.36% |
| 1866 | 2,268 | +1.23% |
| 1872 | 2,192 | −0.57% |
| 1876 | 2,267 | +0.84% |
| 1881 | 2,282 | +0.13% |
| 1886 | 2,236 | −0.41% |
| 1891 | 2,322 | +0.76% |
| 1896 | 2,348 | +0.22% |
| 1901 | 2,308 | −0.34% |

| Year | Pop. | ±% p.a. |
|---|---|---|
| 1906 | 2,427 | +1.01% |
| 1911 | 2,495 | +0.55% |
| 1921 | 2,370 | −0.51% |
| 1926 | 2,489 | +0.98% |
| 1931 | 2,358 | −1.08% |
| 1936 | 2,517 | +1.31% |
| 1946 | 2,557 | +0.16% |
| 1954 | 2,499 | −0.29% |
| 1962 | 2,604 | +0.52% |
| 1968 | 3,092 | +2.90% |
| 1975 | 3,940 | +3.52% |
| 1982 | 4,563 | +2.12% |
| 1990 | 4,567 | +0.01% |
| 1999 | 4,399 | −0.42% |
| 2007 | 4,870 | +1.28% |
| 2012 | 5,243 | +1.49% |
| 2017 | 5,434 | +0.72% |
| 2023 | 5,414 | −0.06% |

Source: EHESS and INSEE (1968-2023)

== Breton language ==
The municipality launched a linguistic plan through Ya d'ar brezhoneg on 11 February 2008.

== See also ==
- Communes of the Côtes-d'Armor department
