= Olivier Martinet =

French architect

Olivier Martinet (XVIIe - ?) was an 18th-century French architect of the Comté de Laval.

== Life ==
=== Origin ===
He was the son of Jean Martinet and Renée Bellier (the Belliers were linked to several architects). He was also affiliated to the Langlois family.

=== Architect ===
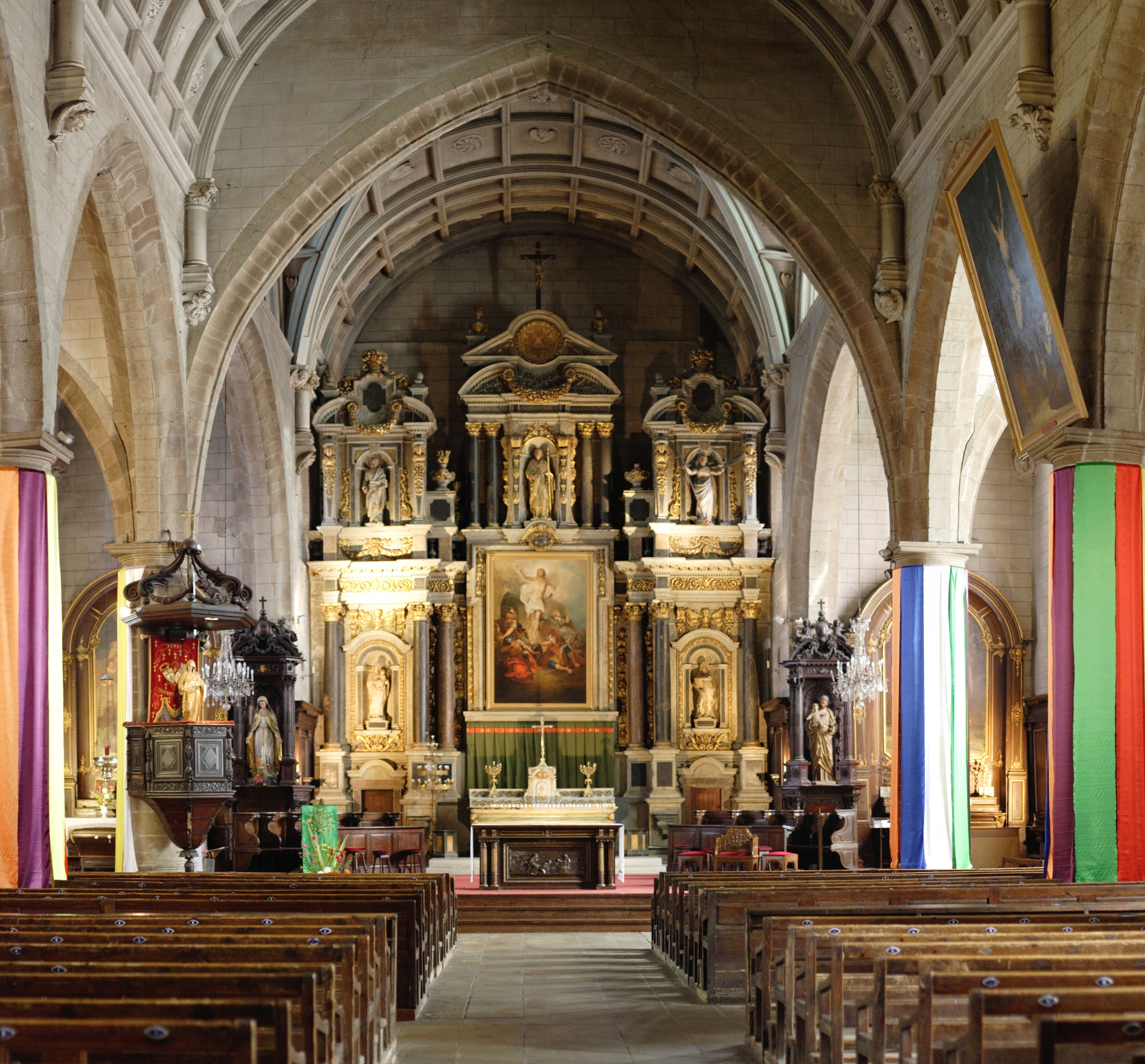
The interior of Saint-Gildas d'Auray church

One evening of the 1645 Fête-Dieu, at the end of the suburb of Saint-Martin de Laval, a fight took place between Jean-Michel Langlois and Olivier Martinet on one side and the architects François and Pierre Vignier on the other, but the complaint was withdrawn, and they reconciled. Another time, in 1666, François Langlois was accused of wounding Jacques Chevreul, master locksmith, in a quarrel.

He lived in Vitré in 1647 when he had his first known market signed in Laval to build the main altar of the Abbaye de la Joie in Hennebont.

In the same year, he took part in the auction of the reredos of Église Saint-Martin de Vitré which he won against the Langlois and the marble maker Julien Lecomte However, it did not respect the planned deadlines and completed the project in 1649 In 1647, he ordered again marble noir d'Argentré from Rochereau et Cuvelier, which was to be delivered to Nantes.

In 1650, he built an altar at Saint-Colomban Church in Quimperlé. In 1653, he is at Port-Louis where he built the altars of the Church of Our Lady.

On May 31, 1655, he lived in Hennebont, and came to Laval to settle his marble scores with Michel Rochereau. At the same time, he erected three retables lavallois in Séglien, Ploërdut and Locmalo. On April 7, 1657, he lived in Auray where he built an altar at the Église Saint-Gildas d'Auray.

He then erected an altar in a side chapel of the Dominican Church of Rennes. He then returned to Port-Louis, where the work seemed episodic. It was probably at the same time that he was raising the main altar and two side altarpieces in the church of Carnac, that he finished in 1659.

In 1660, he built the altarpiece of the main altar of Brélévenez, then in 1667, that of Laniscat. From 1668 to 1670 or 1672, he built an altarpiece at the Église Saint-Jean-Baptiste de Saint-Jean-du-Doigt. In 1672, he had the following transported from Nantes to Château du Taureau and at the hâvre of Pontrieux marble and tufa. Jacques Salbert thinks that an altarpiece was built in the chapel of the Château du Taureau, and that the rest of the material was used to build the altarpiece of Guingamp.

In 1672, he worked on the construction of the main altar of the Abbaye de Beauport. In 1679, Martinet made the altarpiece of Tressignaux, then probably also in Guingamp in 1680. The altarpiece of Bréhat is also attributed to Olivier Martinet.

== Bibliography ==
- Jules-Marie Richard, Les constructeurs de retables, Société d'archéologie et d'histoire de la Mayenne, 1906.
- Jacques Salbert, Ateliers de retabliers Lavallois aux XVIIe et XVIIIe siècles: Études historiques et artistiques, Presses Universitaires de Rennes, 1976.
