= Guingamp =

Guingamp Gwengamp (Breton)
- Subprefecture and commune
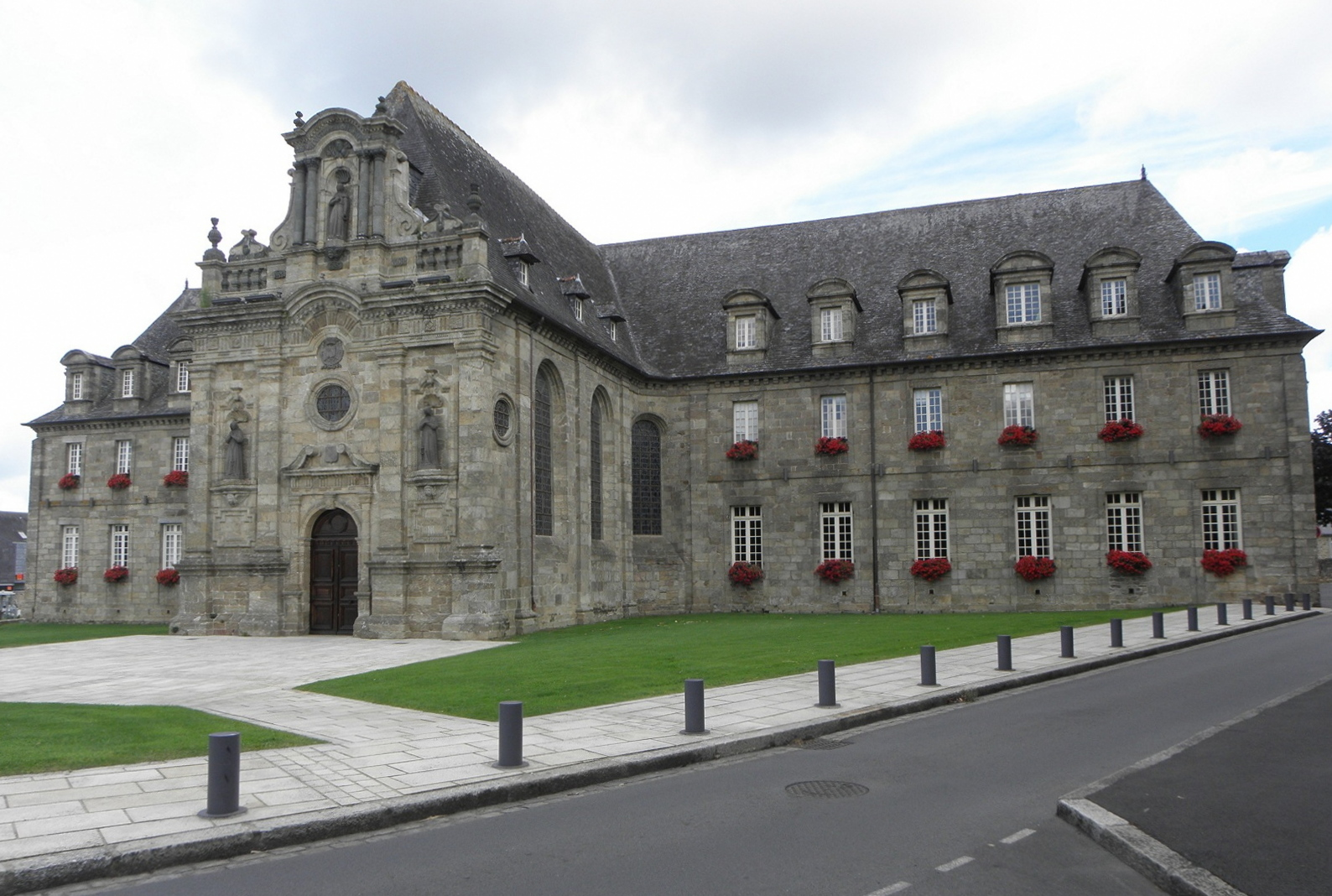
- Guingamp's Town Hall

- Flag Coat of arms
- Location of Guingamp
- Location within France Location within Brittany
- Coordinates: 48°33′48″N 3°09′00″W
- Country: France
- Region: Brittany
- Department: Côtes-d'Armor
- Arrondissement: Guingamp
- Canton: Guingamp
- Intercommunality: Guingamp-Paimpol Agglomération

Government
  - Mayor (2020–2026): Philippe Le Goff
- Area^{1}: 3.41 km^{2} (1.32 sq mi)
- Highest elevation: 126 m (413 ft)
- Lowest elevation: 62 m (203 ft)
- Population (2023): 7,111
  - Density: 2,090/km^{2} (5,400/sq mi)
- Demonym(s): Guingampais (masculine); Guingampaise (feminine)
- Time zone: UTC+01:00 (CET)
  - Summer (DST): UTC+02:00 (CEST)
- INSEE/Postal code: 22070 /22200
- ^{1} French Land Register data, which excludes lakes, ponds, glaciers > 1 km^{2} (0.386 sq mi or 247 acres) and river estuaries.

Guingamp (French: [ɡɛ̃ɡɑ̃]; Breton: Gwengamp [ˈɡwɛ̃ŋɡãmp]) is a commune in the Côtes-d'Armor department in Brittany in northwestern France. With a population of 7,115 as of 2020, Guingamp is one of the smallest towns in Europe to have had a top-tier professional football team: En Avant Guingamp, which played in Ligue 1 from 2013 until 2019. The Guingamp station is served by high-speed trains to Brest, Rennes and Paris, and regional trains to Brest, Lannion, Carhaix, Paimpol and Rennes.

== History ==
The town contains the remains of three successive castles, the last of which was razed to the ground by the order of Cardinal Richelieu in the early 17th century. They were reduced to three towers.

Vincent de Bourbon, great-grandson of Louis XIV, was Count of Guingamp from 1750 to his death in 1752.

== Urbanism ==
Guingamp is an urban commune part of the urban unit of Guingamp with 5 others cities of the department representing 22,049 inhabitants.

The commune is also part of the Guingamp functional area. This area, which includes 15 communes, is categorized as an area of less than 50,000 inhabitants in 2020.

== Population ==
Historical population

Year	Pop.	±% p.a.
1793	5,177	—
1800	5,190	+0.04%
1806	4,973	−0.71%
1821	5,550	+0.73%
1831	6,100	+0.95%
1836	6,466	+1.17%
1841	6,796	+1.00%
1846	6,949	+0.45%
1851	6,718	−0.67%
1856	6,893	+0.52%
1861	7,350	+1.29%
1866	6,977	−1.04%
1872	7,045	+0.16%
1876	7,895	+2.89%
1881	8,404	+1.26%
1886	8,744	+0.80%
1891	9,196	+1.01%
1896	9,272	+0.16%
1901	9,252	−0.04%

Year	Pop.	±% p.a.
1906	9,212	−0.09%
1911	9,385	+0.37%
1921	7,923	−1.68%
1926	8,575	+1.59%
1931	8,644	+0.16%
1936	8,663	+0.04%
1946	9,080	+0.47%
1954	8,117	−1.39%
1962	8,912	+1.17%
1968	9,232	+0.59%
1975	9,284	+0.08%
1982	8,507	−1.24%
1990	7,905	−0.91%
1999	8,008	+0.14%
2007	7,661	−0.55%
2012	7,235	−1.14%
2017	6,895	−0.96%
2023	7,111	+0.52%

Source: EHESS and INSEE (1968-2023)

== Sports ==
The city is well-known for its professional football team, En Avant de Guingamp, which won the Coupe de France against Rennes in the 2008–09 season while playing in Ligue 2. The team returned to Ligue 1 for the 2013–14 season for the first time in 9 years. Guingamp again won the French Cup against Rennes in 2013–14 and qualified for the 2014–15 UEFA Europa League.

With 18,120 seats, the Stade de Roudourou which is the club's stadium has a capacity greater than the total population of Guingamp (7,115 inhabitants).

== Culture ==
The Saint Loup festival, a national competition of Breton dances and international festival, takes place every in around mid August. It culminates in a traditional dance called la Dérobée de Guingamp. The festival features Celtic musicians from Asturias, Ireland, Galicia, Scotland, Wales, and elsewhere. Breton dance features in other cultural manifestations and the local cultural office organizes a contemporary creative dance week.

The municipality launched a plan for the Breton language through Ya d'ar brezhoneg on 8 July 2008. In 2008, 15.89% of primary school children attended bilingual schools.

The annual 'pardon' brings pilgrims to pay homage to the 'Black Virgin' in the Basilica of Notre Dame de Bon Secours.

== Personalities ==
- Joseph Guy Ropartz, composer
- Théophile Marie Brébant, Colonel in the French Army

== Twin towns – sister cities ==
Guingamp is twinned with:

- (Republic of Ireland) Shannon, Ireland, since 1991
- Aue, Germany, since 2011
- Urbino, Italy

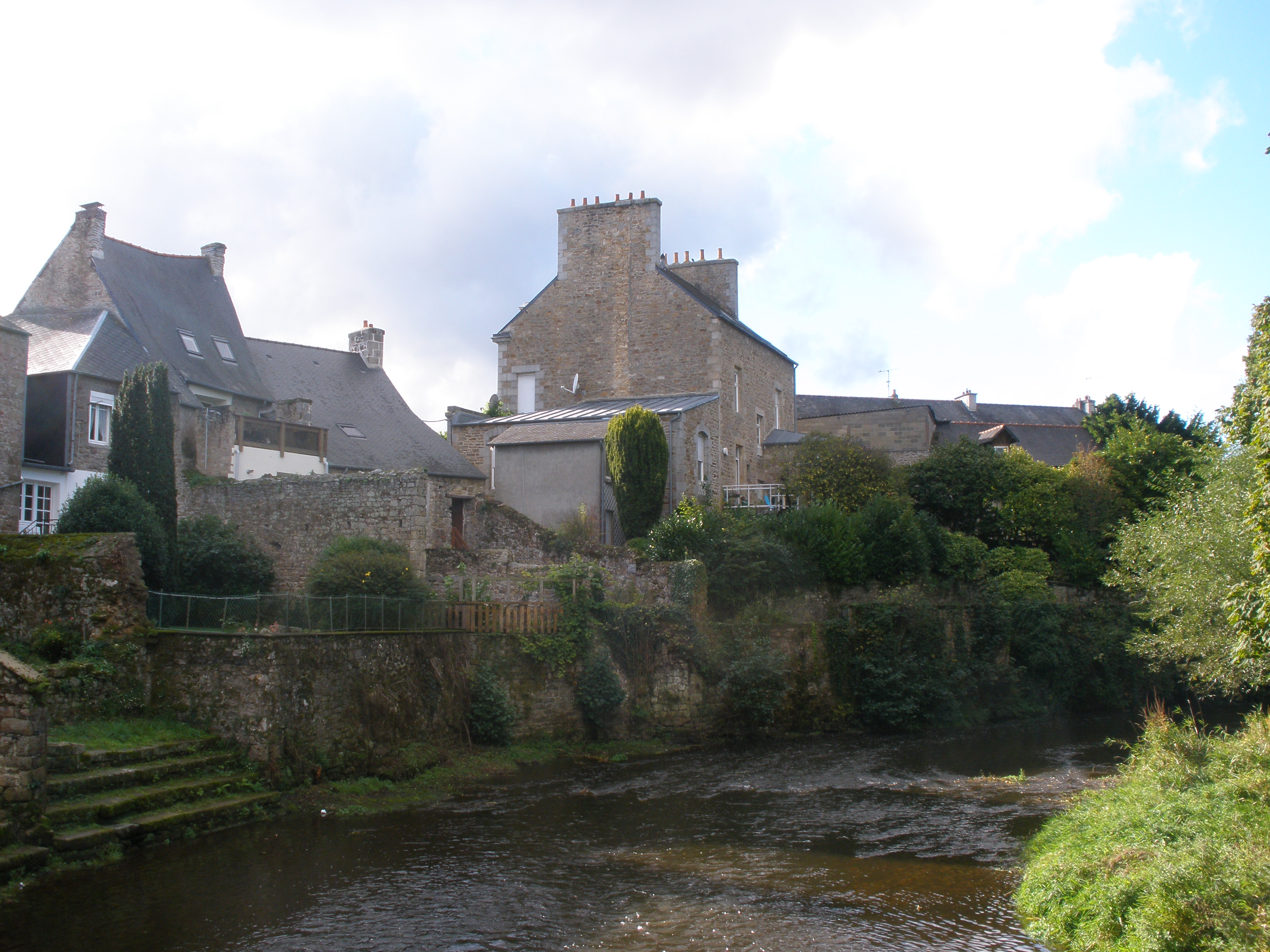
A view from one of Trieux's bridges

== See also ==
- Communes of the Côtes-d'Armor department
- Élie Le Goff, sculptor of Guingamp statue of Joan of Arc
