= Church of Notre-Dame de Runan =

Church in Côtes-d'Armor, France

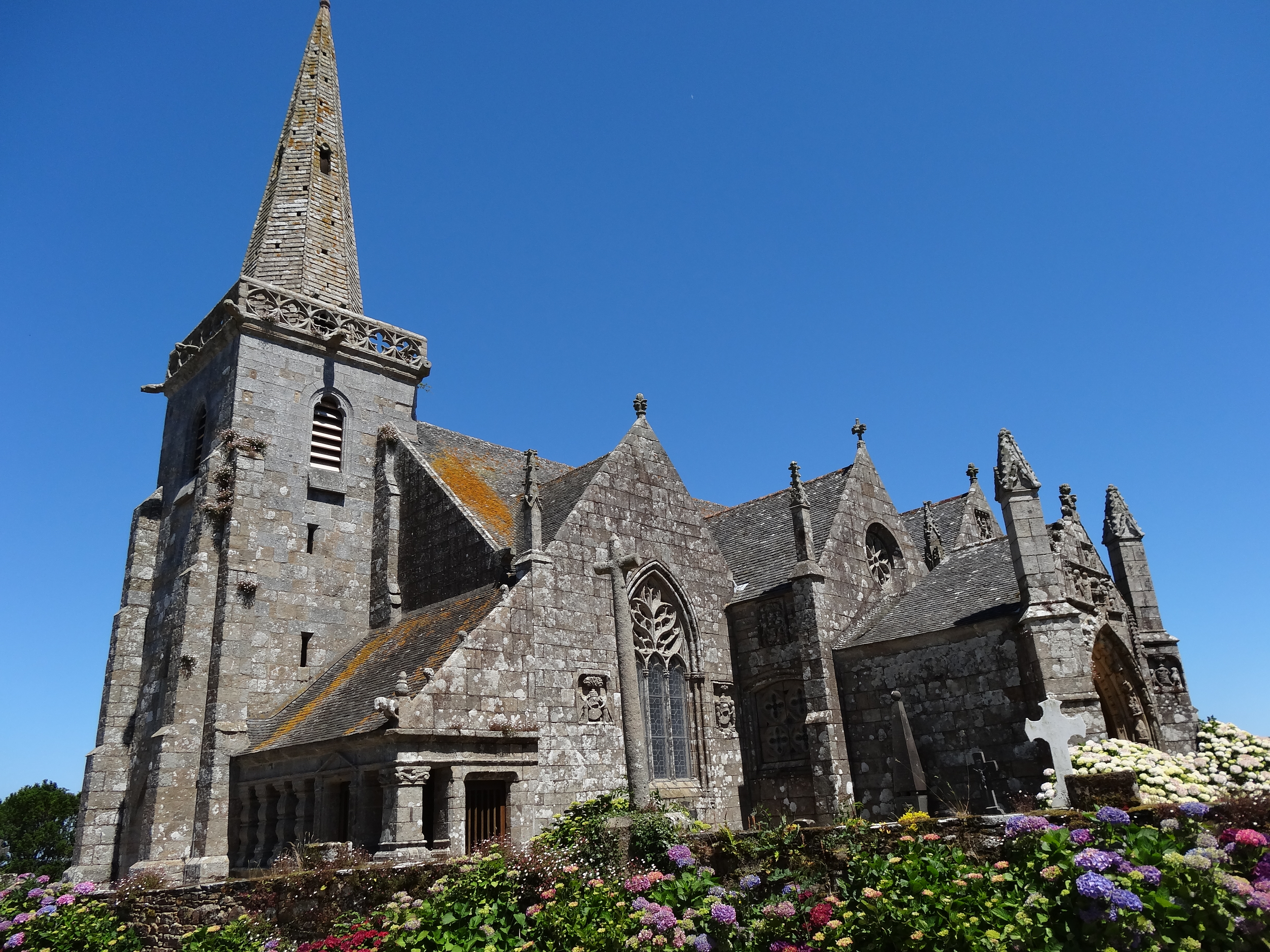
- Church of Notre-Dame de Runan seen from the south

- Location within Côtes-d'Armor Location within France

Religion
- Affiliation: Catholicism
- Region: Brittany
- Deity: Notre-Dame

Location
- Location: Runan
- State: Côtes d'Armor
- Country: France
- Interactive map of Church of Notre-Dame de Runan
- Coordinates: 48°41′38″N 3°12′49″W

Architecture
- Style: Gothic
- Completed: 19th century
- Monument historique
- Designated: 1907, church, 1925, enclosure wall, 1951, calvary

Notre-Dame de Runan is a Catholic church built between the late 14th and mid-16th centuries. It is located in the commune of Runan in the French department of Côtes-d'Armor in Brittany.

The building of the church benefited from the protection of the Dukes of Brittany, the commanderies of Le Palacret and La Feuillée of the Hospitallers of Saint John of Jerusalem, and the patronage of the local aristocracy. All these sponsors left their mark on the building's decoration: the Dukes of Brittany granted fairground privileges that enabled several campaigns of work to be financed; local nobles supported the construction of the bell tower-porch and the main window in 1423; and the Hospitaller Commander Pierre de Keramborgne financed the renovation of the south aisle, with the seigniorial chapel, and the southern portal with its sculpted portal in 1438.

The most important elements are the gabled southern front with its sculpted portal and the main window, whose tympanum bears the coat of arms and motto of Duke John V above lancets housing holy figures in front of precious hangings. These saints surmount the coats of arms of the local nobles who financed the stained glass.

The church was listed as a historic monument on December 19, 1907.

== History ==
Runan was mentioned as early as 1182 in a charter from Conan IV, Duke of Brittany, confirming various donations to the Knights Templar. However, nothing in the deed indicates the existence of a religious building. Evidence of such a building only appeared in the 1380s, when John IV de Montfort, Duke of Brittany, designated an almoner there on March 1381 and founded a mass there. His successor John V then granted the chapel several annual fairs: on the feast day of Notre-Dame; on Saint-Barnabé's day; and a third on the Saturday preceding the last Sunday in July, the day of the chapel's grand pardon. Duke Francis I, then King Henry III, in turn added other fairs.

The donation to the Knights Templar passed into the hands of the Hospitallers of St. John of Jerusalem in the 13th century. It depended on the Palacret commandery, established in what is now the commune of Saint-Laurent, and La Feuillée commandery. Despite the existence of the ducal chapel, the Hospitallers remained the lords of the place; the church was also, religiously speaking, a dependency of the parish of Plouëc, until after the French Revolution: it was not established as a parish until 1825.

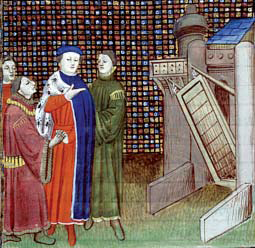
"John IV, Duke of Brittany and his counselors", in Jean Froissart's Chronicles.

It is difficult to determine the architectural structure of the chapel in which John IV held mass in 1381, as subsequent building campaigns profoundly altered the edifice. In the 14th century, the church may have had a tau shape, with a single nave ending in a transept, modelled on the chapel of Saint-Jean de Trévoazan, which also belonged to the Palacret commandery. The north aisle was added at the time of the ducal foundation, which also provided an opportunity to restore the transept. The bell tower-porch and main window were built around 1423, on the initiative of the local aristocracy, whose heraldy can be seen on the stained glass, and Duke John V, who had just granted a new fair in 1423. The southern porch and south aisle were completed in 1438 with the help of Pierre de Keramborgne, Commander of La Feuillée. They housed the baptismal font and the seigniorial chapel. This campaign also saw the resurfacing of the south arm of the transept, to match that of the new façade. In the second half of the 15th century, another wall was built to close off the placître, with a calvary and an external pulpit at the south-west corner of the parish enclosure. In addition, there was a market hall, no longer in existence, of which a drawing survives in the urbarium of La Feuillée's commandery in 1731.

The work was completed in 1552 with the construction of a lean-to ossuary leaning against the church façade, on the outside of the south aisle. Subsequent work focused mainly on interior fittings: a new high altar was installed in 1661 to replace the old Gothic retablo, which was in turn replaced by another altarpiece covering the main window in 1728. At the same date, the rood screen was replaced by a pulpit. In the 19th century, the Gothic retablo was moved from an oratory in the cemetery, which no longer exists, to the baptismal font chapel. During the French Revolution, the heraldies on the south façade, porch and interior of the church were vandalized; the rest of the sculpted decoration was spared. As for the stained glass window in the axis bay, it was protected because it was then hidden by masonry, where it was found in the mid-19th century by Geslin de Bourgogne.

The 19th century was a period of restoration: a first campaign in 1822 led to the replacement of most of the cladding on the bell tower-porch. However, the old spire and guard rail were retained. In 1895, more extensive work was carried out: the north aisle was rebuilt on the gabled model of the southern front; a neo-Gothic sacristy was added to the south wall of the chevet; the gables of the south chapels and some of their pinnacles were restored; and the building's roof structure was rebuilt, with richly sculpted runners in the nave.

The church was listed as a historic monument by decree on December 19, 1907. The enclosing wall of the cemetery was listed as a historic monument by decree of March 6, 1925. The calvary was listed as a historic monument by decree of December 4, 1951.

== Description ==
=== Exterior ===
==== The bell tower-porch ====
The church's silhouette is marked by the bell tower-porch, which leads into the nave from the west. Built around 1423, at the same time as the apse, it was extensively restored in 1822. However, it retains the general structure, the quatrefoil guard rail and the spire typical of Trégor architecture, as seen, for example, at Sainte-Catherine church in La Roche-Derrien. The interior is covered by a groin vault, with segmental arches resting on sculpted lamp bases. This porch gives access to the nave through two very simple three-arched doors that blend into the splayed sections, in a style also found at La Roche-Derrien and the chapel of Kermaria an Iskuit.

==== The southern wall and portal ====
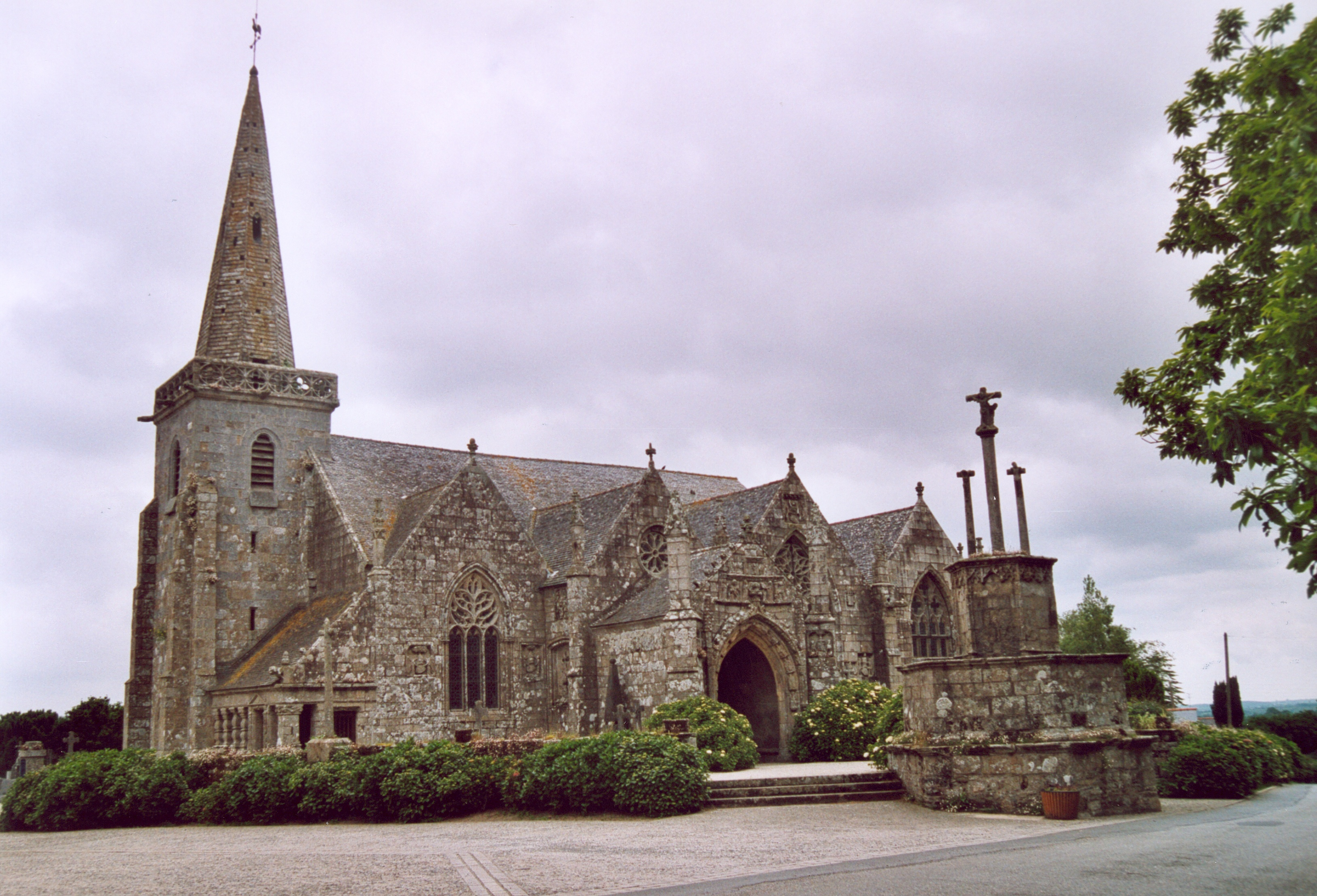
Church of Notre-Dame de Runan seen from the south.

The south side is the most ornate part of the church. It takes the form of a façade with a row of fairly homogeneous gables crowned by a finial, in large granite brickwork. Buttresses, each topped by a pinnacle, separate the gables and punctuate the wall. This is one of the earliest examples of a gabled wall in Brittany.

The gable closest to the porch is that of the baptismal font chapel. A large, flamboyantly infilled bay opens the wall. To the left of this opening are engraved the heraldies of the de Kernechriou family, quarterly Argent and Sable, crowned with a crest flory held by two angels; to the right are the arms of the de Kerbouric family, Argent on a saltire Sable between four roses Gules.

This first gable is set back from the following ones, to which it is linked by a return wall section. A low window with four quatrefoils opens it. A shield held by two leopards surmounts it. The great helm on the shield indicates that it is a knight's coat of arms; however, the coat of arms is battered and it is not clear to whom it belongs. The leopards, however, indicate that this is not Pierre de Keramborgne, Commander of the Hospitallers, whose shield was held by two lions.

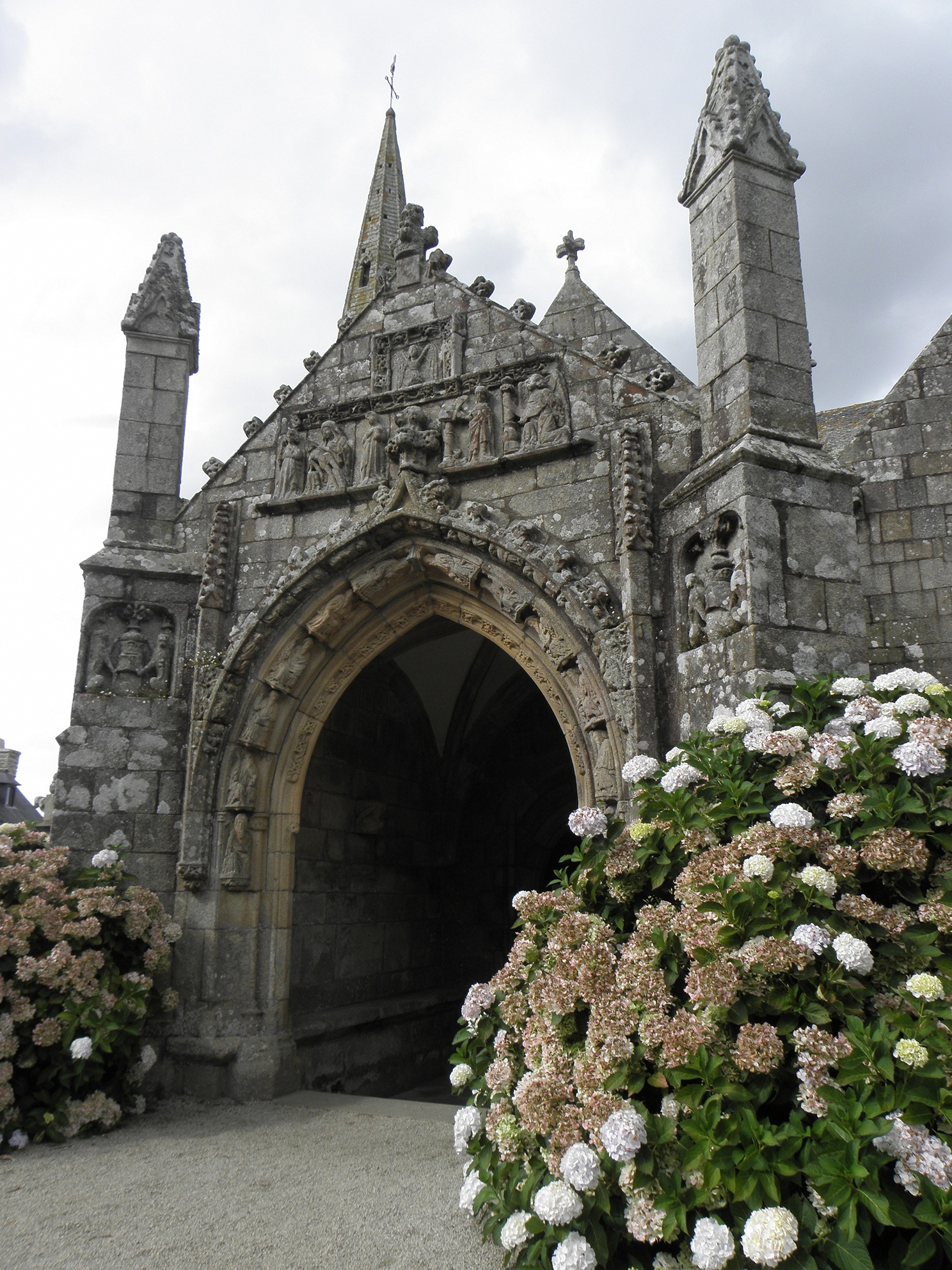
The porch of Runan church.

The second bay houses the monumental side porch, which juts out in front of the wall and stands out from the row of gables. Above the porch, the gable roof is opened by a poly-lobed rose. The entrance to the porch is a pointed-arch opening with three segments resting on slender columns. The inner arch is covered by a plant garland; the twelve Apostles sit on the middle arch; a procession of angels fills the third. An archivolt decorated with curly cabbages crowns the whole and crosses the lateral pinnacles. A bas-relief occupies the gable end of the porch, showing the Annunciation on the right and the Pietà on the left. Above, an angel dwells in a foliage frame. The decoration is reminiscent of the mid-15th-century Notre-Dame de la Clarté chapel in Perros-Guirec. Lastly, the porch wall is adorned with curly cabbages, and the end of the roof bears the ducal coat of arms. The interior of the porch is covered by an octagonal vault; its eight fine ribs meet in a rose crowned with cherubs. The covered space leads to a pointed-arch doorway, the entrance to the church.

Built at the same time as the previous one, the third gable corresponds to the seigniorial chapel. It is illuminated by a five-lancet bay topped by a flamboyant rose window. The current infill was restored in 1855. The original infill was probably quite similar to that of the baptismal font chapel. On the wall, the coat of arms of Duke John V de Montfort, placed at the top of the gable, dominates that of Jean du Perrier, at the top right of the bay. There used to be other coats of arms in the lower section, but they have been mutilated and are now illegible.

The fourth gable corresponds to the transept. The foundations were built in the middle of the 14th century, and then, during the 1437-1438 campaign that saw the reorganization of the south aisle, the exterior facing was reworked to unify the overall appearance of the south front. A window with four lancets surmounted by three quatrefoils illuminates the south arm of the transept. It was built on the same model as the symmetrical window in the north arm. Both are reminiscent of the windows in the apse of the Tréguier cathedral, built in the last quarter of the 14th century.

==== The north wall ====
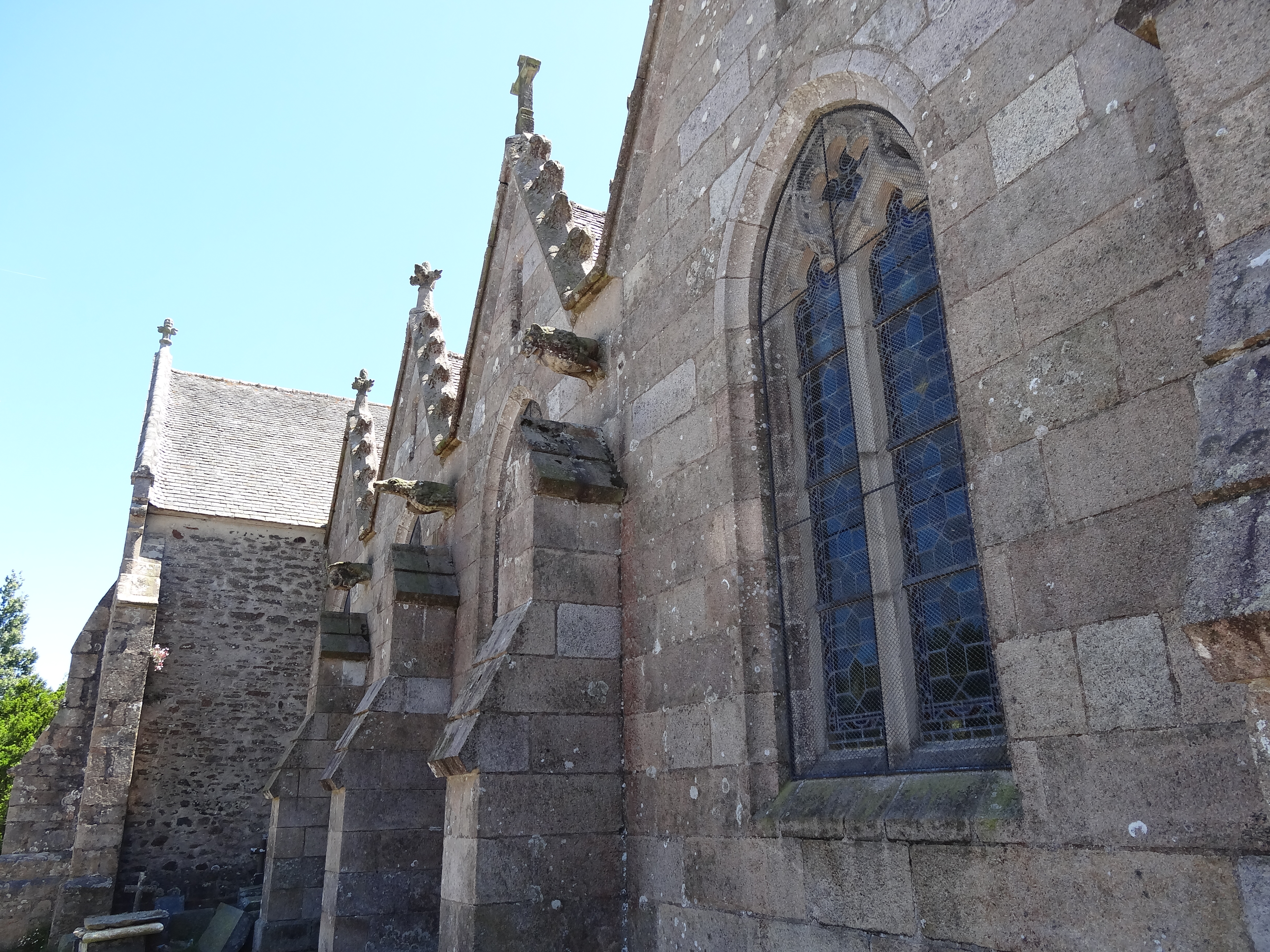
North aisle wall of the Runan church.

The north side is less decorated than the south front. Built during the mid-14th-century campaign, it underwent only minor modifications in the 15th century: the gable crossettes, the railings and the fleuron at the top of the transept arm. The transept arm is supported by five buttresses, including one under the bay, whose infill is built on the same model as the south arm.

==== The apse ====
The apse, as well as the bell-tower porch, was built during the 1423 construction campaign. It is a flat apse, with a gable supported by four buttresses. This wall is pierced by a large bay with six lancets topped by multiple apertures, the filling of which is reminiscent of 14th-century English Decorated Style stained-glass windows, such as the main window of the Heckington church, dated 1333: curves and counter-curves around a large central speckle.

==== The calvary and the pulpit ====
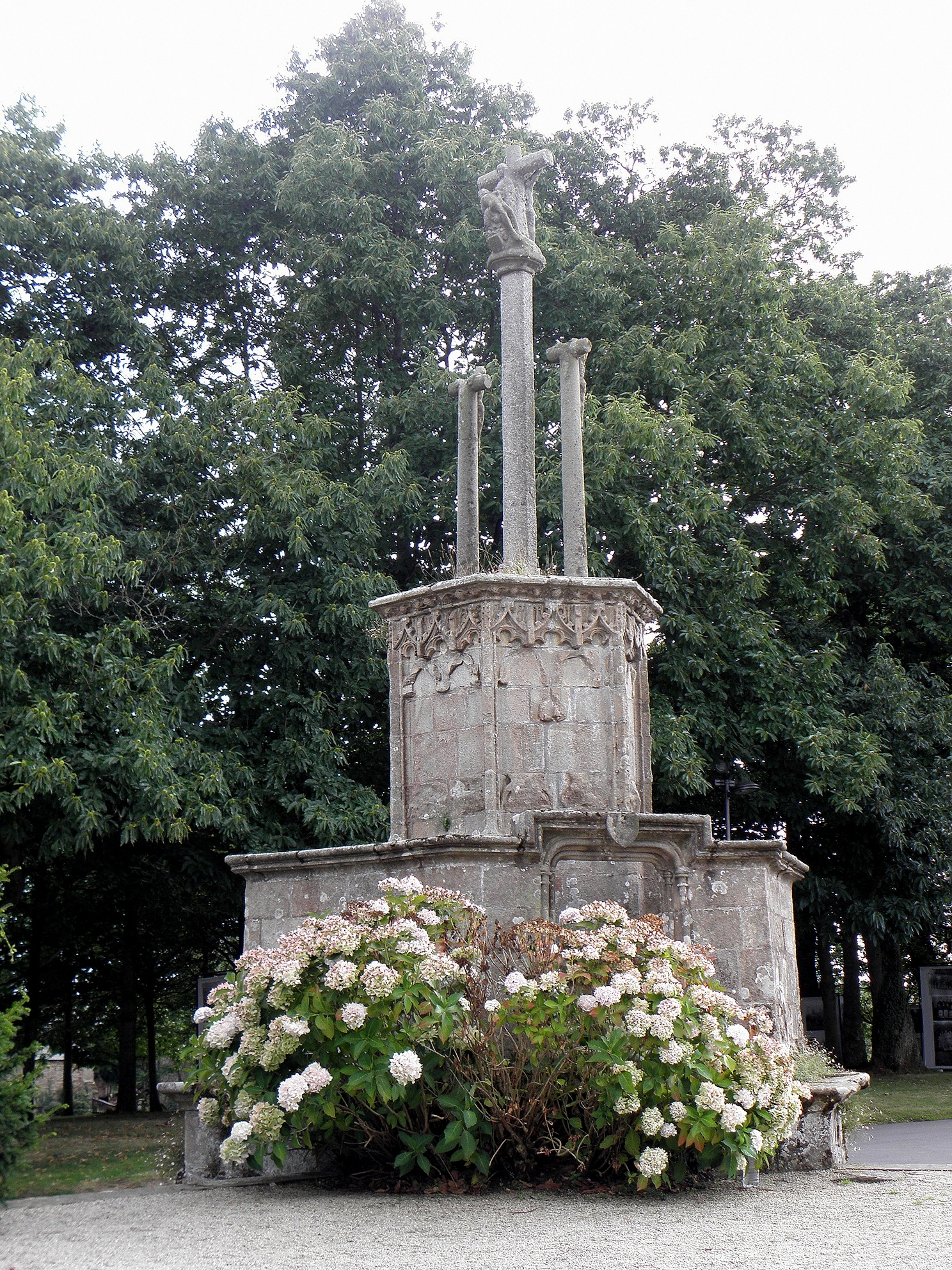
Calvary at Runan church, seen from the church.

The granite pulpit-calvary stands at the entrance to the parish close. It takes the form of a hexagonal bowl, with a parapet crowned by a molded cornice. The preacher entered from the north, facing the church, through a basket-handle bay framed on either side by colonnettes. The Kernechriou family shield crowns the arcade. At the center of this vat stands the calvary: a hexagonal base, each side of which is crowned by a series of three Gothic dais. Three columns rise from the base: on the sides, the lateral crosses of the two thieves, and in the center, higher up, the cross of Christ. A Virgin of Pity is carved on the reverse of the crucifix.

=== Interior ===
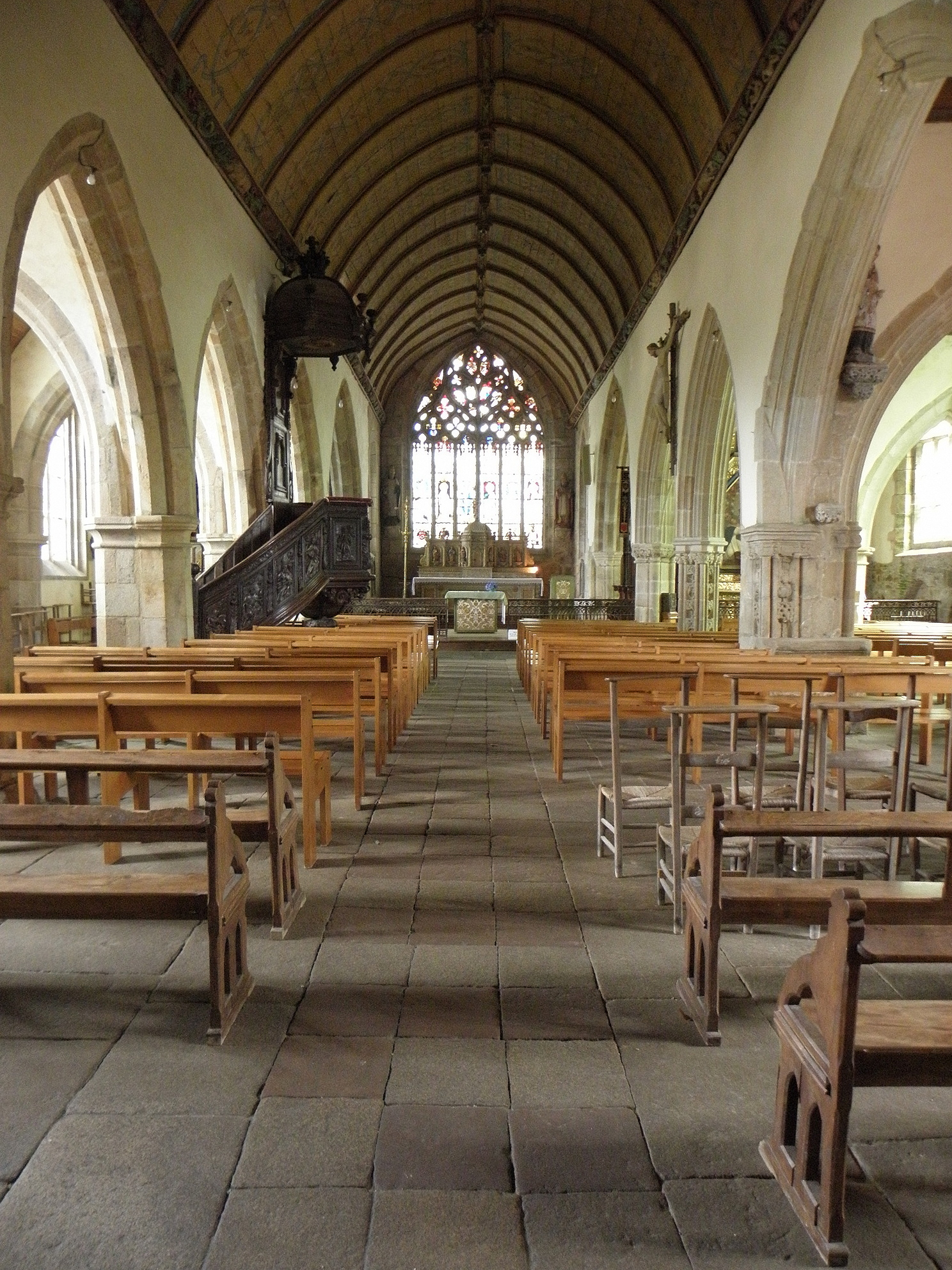
Runan church interior: the central nave.

The Runan church is structured around a long, continuous nave. Its panelled cover leads the eye uninterrupted to the eastern wall of the apse. The main window opens almost completely, serving as a vanishing point. To the right and left, a row of large tiers-point arches on octagonal piers lead to the north and south aisles, directly surmounted by the panelled framework.

The arcades with two chamfered rollers and the piers leading to the north aisle date back to the late 14th century; the rest of the interior of this aisle was completely rebuilt in 1895, when the octagonal piers were doubled by a second pier on the north side, which supports the double arches of the aisle. The facings of the north arm of the transept house two tomb niches, as do those of the south arm.

Several chapels occupy the south aisle. The westernmost houses the baptismal font. It is separated from the rest of the church by tiers-point, four-roller arches, which fall on five-columned piers. These piers, which can be found throughout the south aisle, were built during the 1437-1438 campaign.

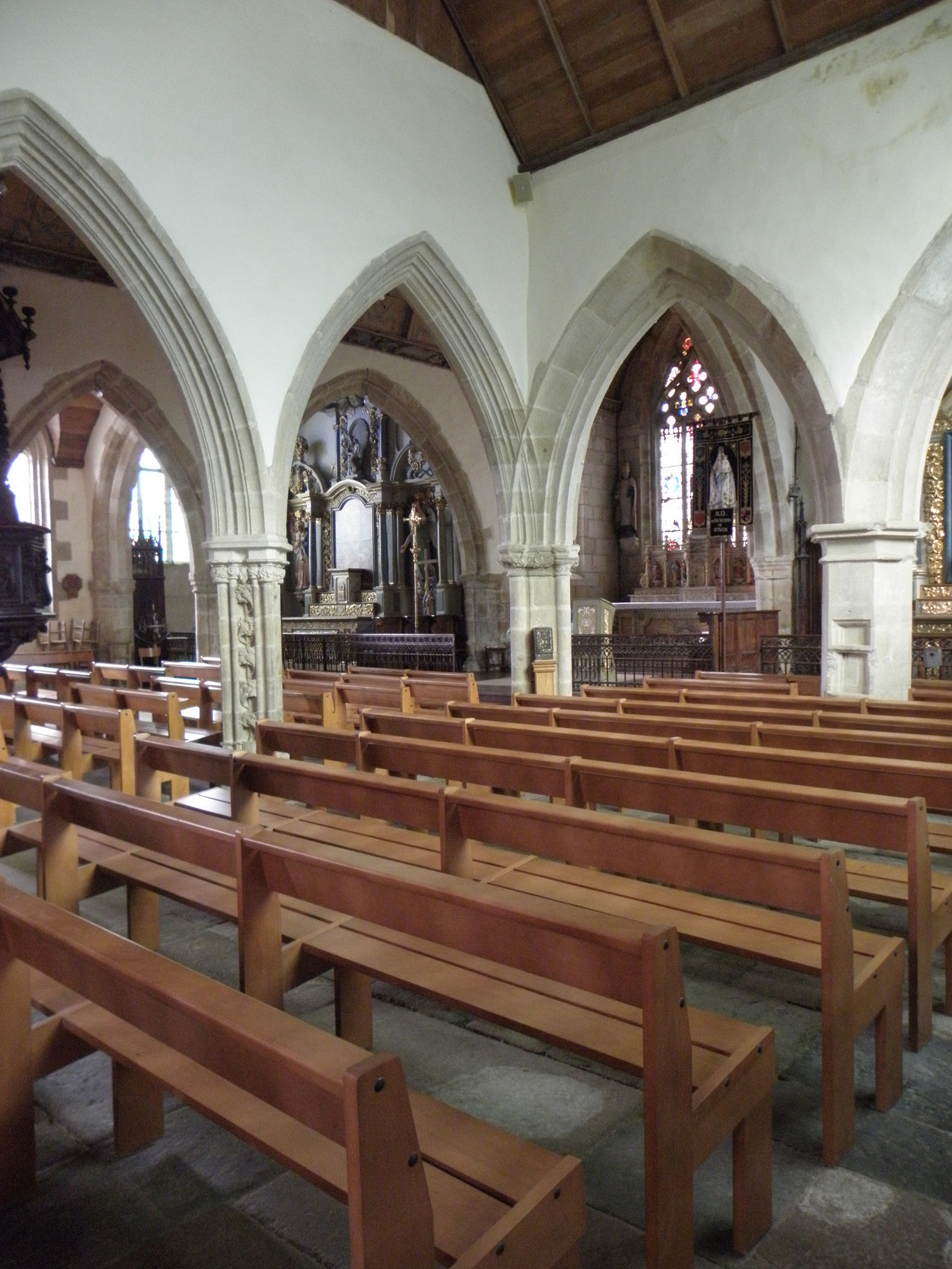
The seigniorial chapel.

The eastern arcade of the font chapel gives access to the southern entrance of the nave, which occupies the second bay. Next is the seigneurial chapel, built in 1437–1438. It occupies the third and fourth bays and is separated from the rest of the side aisle by two rows of square arches with multiple segmental arches, which fall at the corners of the chapel onto piers with bundles of small columns, and at the sides onto lozenge-shaped piers. Three engaged small columns underline the corners of the latter, framing rinceaux that flourish on their sides and bear monsters or animals at their tops. At the top of the pier, just below the arcade, capitals decorated with stylized vine shoots bear chamfered abacuses. The shields carved on the central archways of the two arches separating the chapel from the church entrance in the second bay indicate that this was a seigneurial chapel, the use of which was reserved for local dignitaries.

At its eastern end, this chapel opens onto the south arm of the transept via two double-roll arches, built at the same time as the rest of the seigneurial chapel. They fall on a pillar with three engaged small columns crowned by a capital decorated with foliage. The whole of the column and capital is reminiscent of that of the north aisle, but in a more airy variant with a more pronounced chamfer: this is most likely a late copy, probably made during the 1437-1438 construction work, as indicated by the five courses of the pier, which make it conform to the model of the entire seigniorial chapel. Two tomb niches are carved into the walls of the south arm of the transept: the shields engraved on the headstones indicate that they belong to Olivier de Quelen and Marguerite de Bouteville. In addition, near the choir, a tombstone bears the coat of arms of the Launay-Monteville family, a younger branch of the de Quelen family who held a chapel in Runan.

==== The framework ====
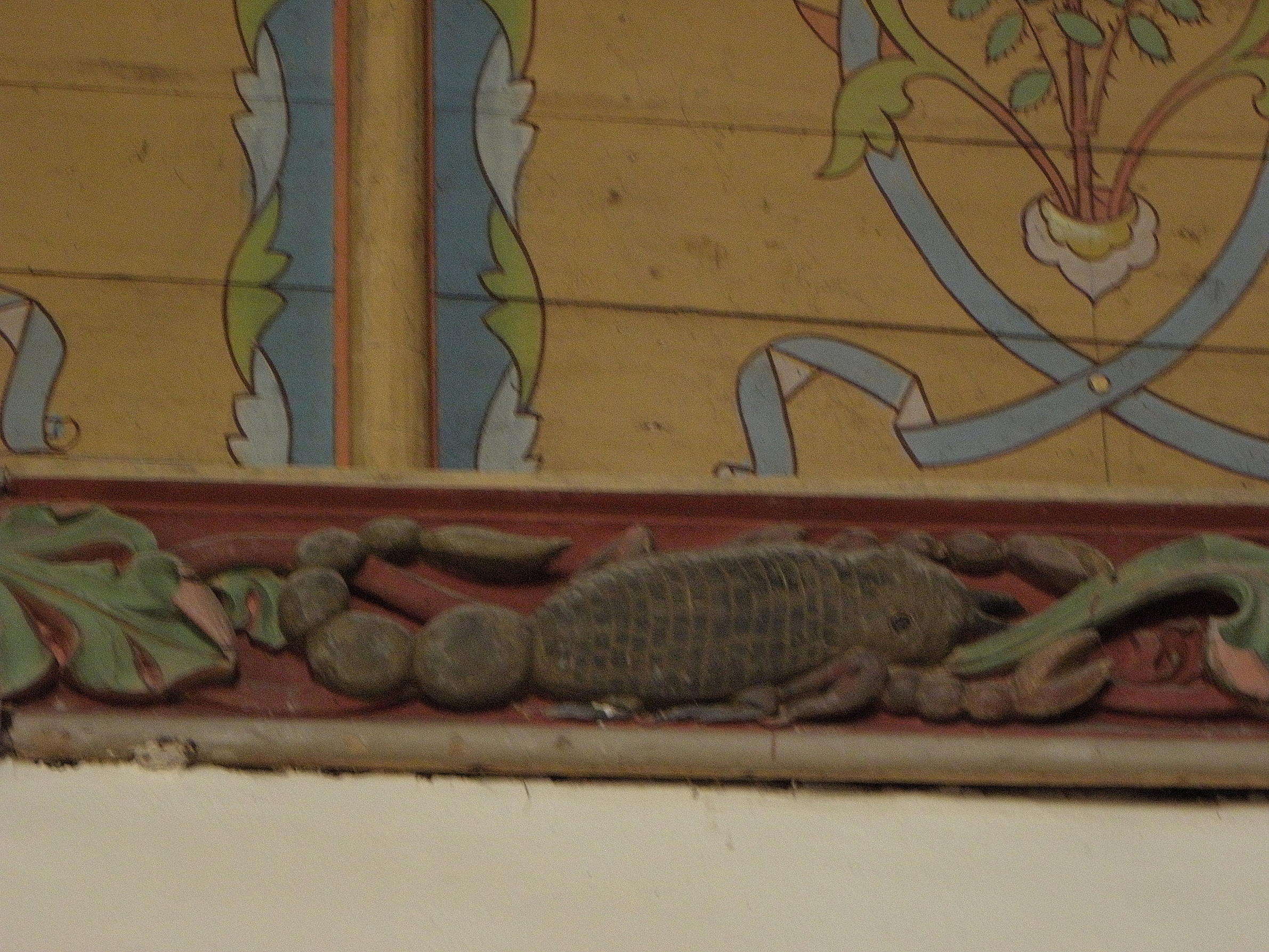
Sandstone of the nave's panelled vault: the Scorpion.

The entire church is covered by a panelled vault. In the central nave, the wall plates supporting the panelling are carved, representing the signs of the Zodiac on the north side and animals from a bestiary symbolizing vices on the south side. This wooden vault, as well as those that counter it in the south aisle, date from the 19th-century restoration.

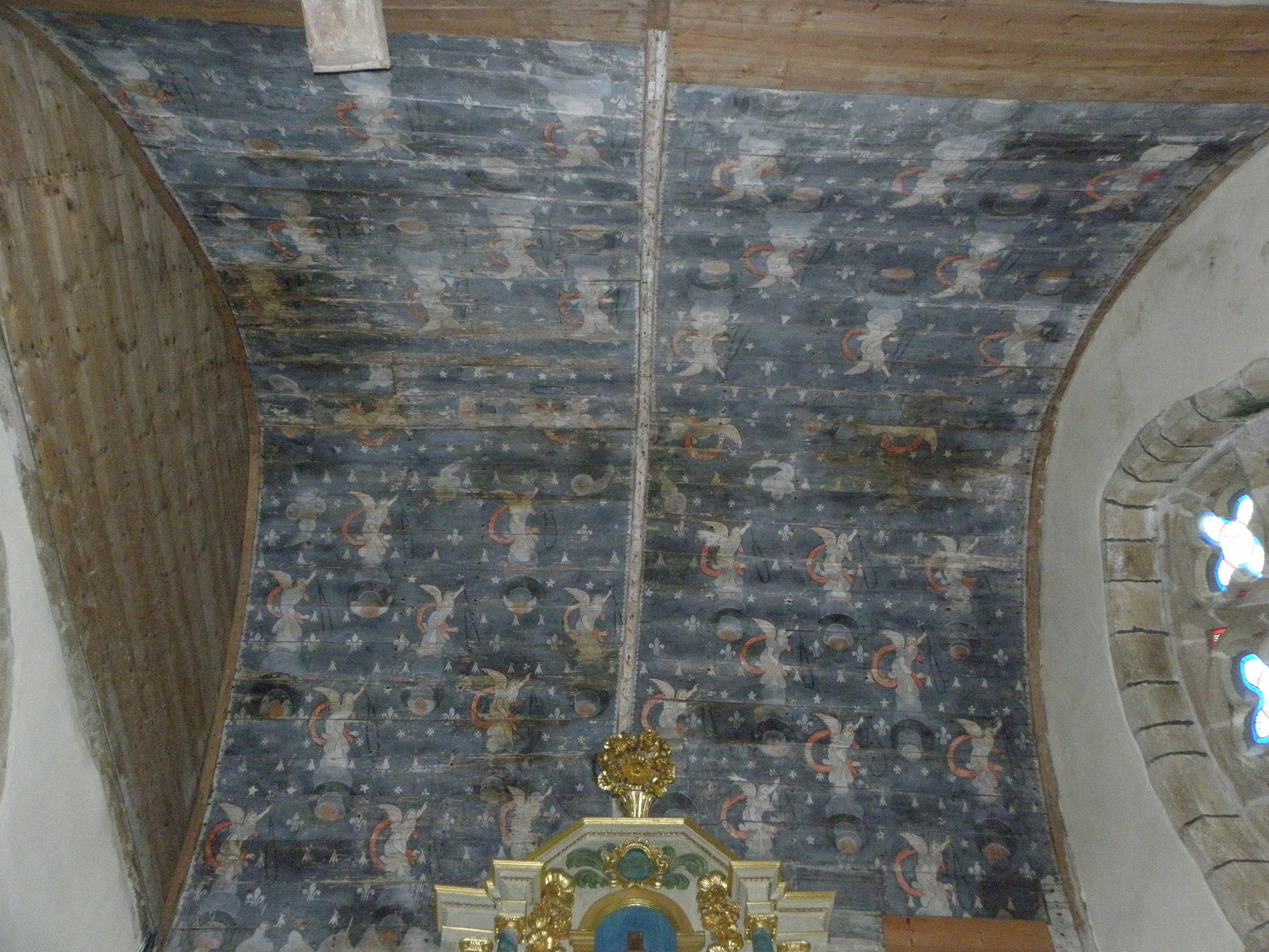
The paneled vault of the Rosary chapel.

Only the panelling in the transept chapels is old. They were built in the early 18th century. The paneling in the south arm of the transept is painted on an azure background, with cherubs carrying rosaries, in accordance with the chapel's dedication to Our Lady of the Rosary (Notre-Dame du rosaire, in French); in the north arm of the transept, stars, crosses and skulls on a white background recall the chapel's 1705 dedication to Notre-Dame de l'Agonie.

==== Furniture ====
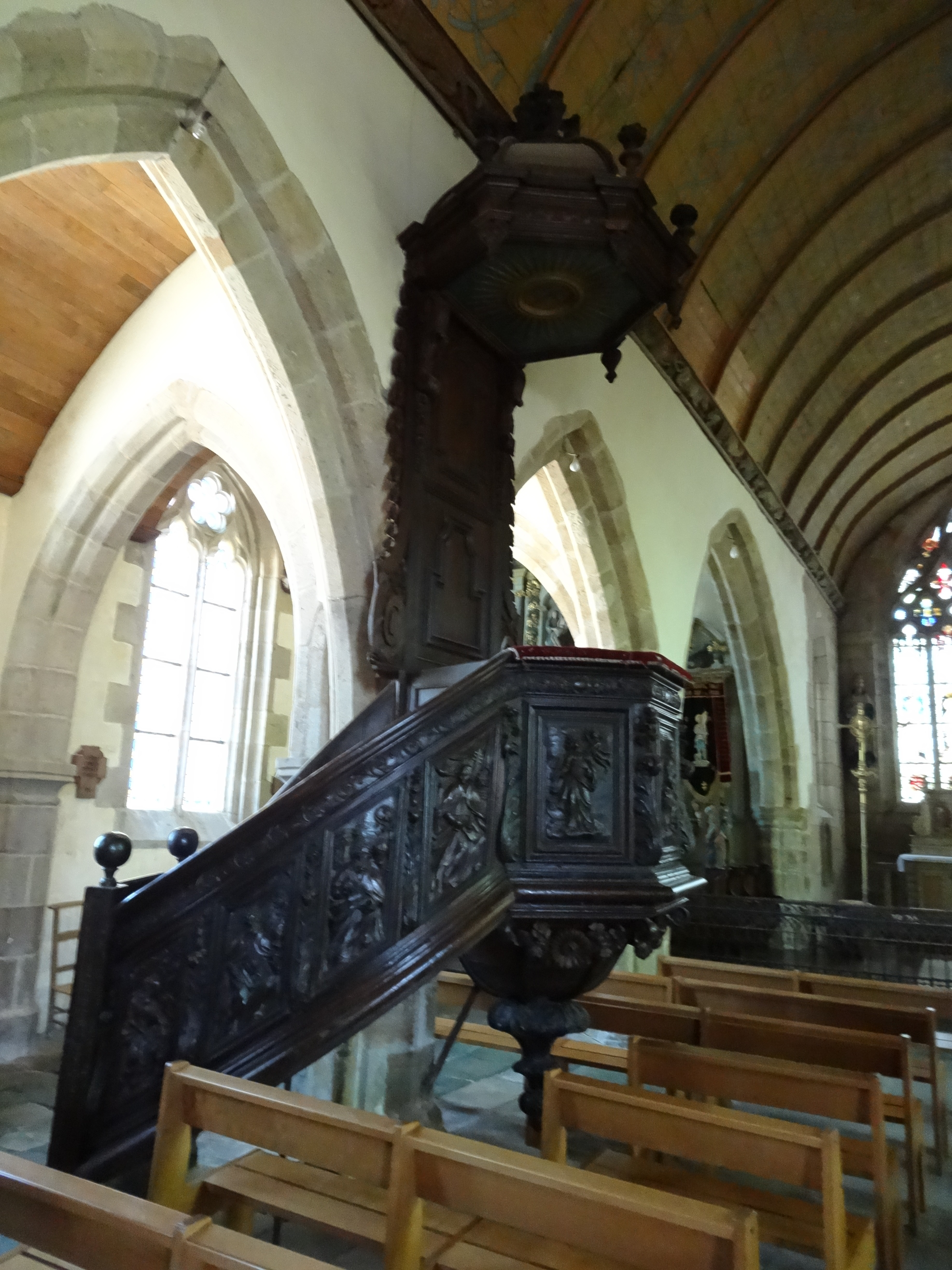
Runan's pulpit

Runan church is home to approximately fifteen objects protected as historic monuments. Unless otherwise stated, they have been listed as historic monuments since January 24, 1980:

- a polychrome wooden statue of the Madonna, carved in the 17th or 18th century;
- a fragment of a calvary carved in granite in the 15th century;
- a polychrome wooden statue of Saint Lupus of Troyes, carved in the 15th or 16th century;
- a polychrome wooden statue of Saint Joseph, carved in the 17th or 18th century;
- a polychrome wooden statue of Saint Ivo of Kermartin, carved in the late 16th or early 17th century;
- a polychrome wooden statue of Saint Anne, carved in the 18th century;
- a polychrome wooden statue of Saint Joachim, carved in the 18th century;
- a polychrome wooden statue of Christ as Salvator Mundi, carved in the 18th or 19th century;
- a polychrome wooden statue of the Virgin Mary, carved in the 18th century (restored in 1998 by Gilbert Le Goel);
- a polychrome wooden statue of an angel, carved in the 18th century (restored in 1998 by Gilbert Le Goel);
- a statue of an unidentified pope, carved in the 17th century, whose hands have disappeared;
- a 16th-century polychrome wooden statue of Saint Peter;
- a polychrome carved wooden ensemble comprising a 15th-century Madonna and two 18th-century angels, with a panel that also serves as a pedestal for the Virgin, listed as a historical monument on October 11, 1976;
- a bronze bell from the workshop of Morlaix founder Jean-François Guillaume, bearing a dedication inscription mentioning the date 1789 and the Commandant Hospitalier du Palacret, listed as a historical monument on March 22, 1974;
- a wooden pulpit carved by Paimpol sculptor Nicolas Le Liffer in 1727, listed as a historic monument on November 14, 2003.

In the southwest corner of the nave lies the recumbent tomb of a couple: a man in full plate armor, and a woman in a long, high-waisted, heavy-draped gown in the fashion of the 15th century. Initially identified as Duke Jean V and his wife Jeanne de France by Benjamin Jolivet, these two figures are now considered to be Henri du Parc, lord of La Roche-Jagu and patron of the Runan fair, who died in 1423, and his wife Catherine de Kersaliou, who died in 1433.

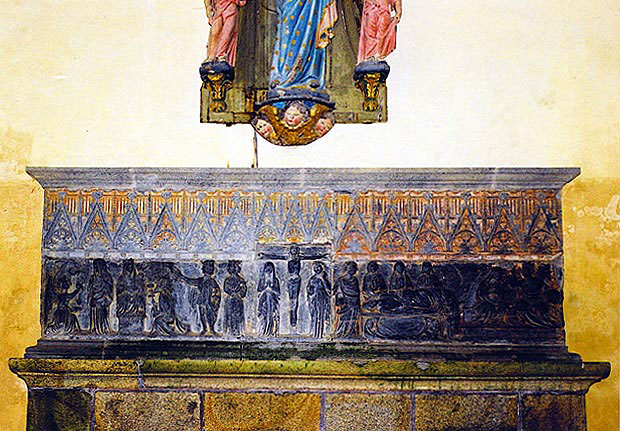
Altarpiece of the Virgin Mary.

In the baptismal font chapel is the old Gothic altarpiece, dedicated to the Virgin Mary. Traditionally thought to be an import from a Flemish altarpiece in Petit Granit, a study of the stone has shown that it was carved in Brittany, from metamorphosed lamprophyre stone. The altarpiece is 3.20 m wide, 1 m high and 30 cm thick. It features scenes from the Annunciation, the Adoration of the Magi, the Crucifixion, the Burial of Jesus and the Coronation of the Virgin, under a canopy frieze of elaborate Gothic architecture.

The workmanship is refined: the hair and drapery are finely sculpted, the eyes are precisely carved, and numerous details are present: nails, book clasps and pages, gloves, hoses... The altarpiece has iconographic similarities with the one in the church of Pléguien, notably the scene of the Coronation of the Virgin, but the latter's workmanship is more crude. This altarpiece was originally placed on the high altar, under the main window. In 1561, it was replaced by a new one and exiled to the cemetery chapel, now destroyed. At an unknown date, it was covered with a clay plaster, perhaps to protect it from revolutionary vandalism. Rediscovered in 1854, it was then installed in its present location, but has never been completely cleaned and retains traces of the plaster, giving it a slightly bluish tint, hence the misunderstanding as to the nature of the stone.

== Stained-glass windows ==
=== The main stained-glass ===
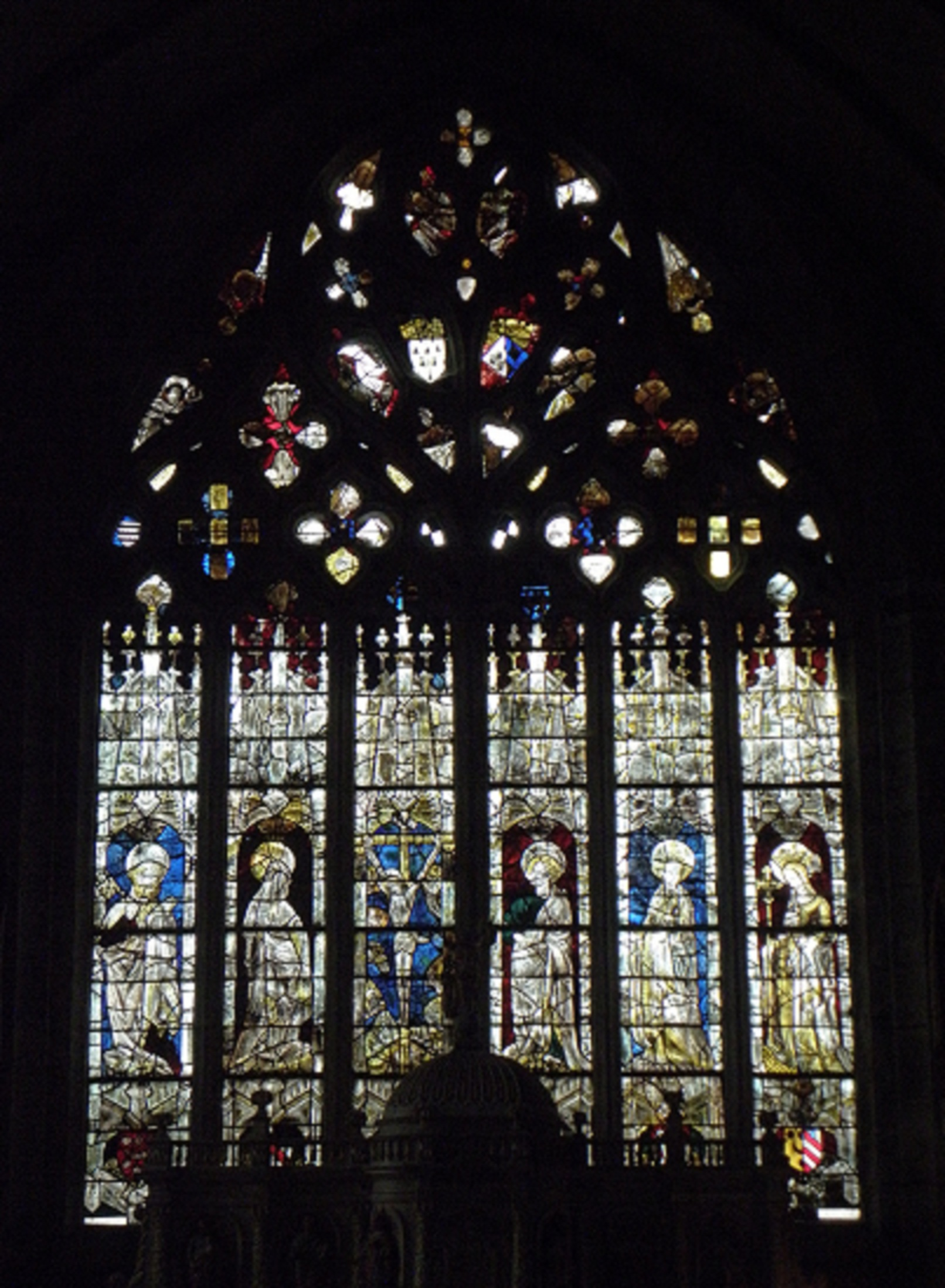
Main stained-glass from Runan church.

The glass roof features six three-lobed lancets, surmounted by a tympanum with 34 openings. It was built during the 1423 renovation campaign, and can be dated by the coats of arms of the donors who appear in it: Jean du Perrier and Constance Gaudin, married in 1423, and Catherine de Kersaliou and her husband Henry du Parc de la Rochejagu, who died the same year. Plastered with mortar around 1728 for the installation of a new altarpiece, it was discovered in the mid-19th century by Jules Geslin de Bourgogne, then restored by the Hucher workshop in 1886. Raphaël Lardeur removed it in 1942 to protect it from the bombardments, and the stained glass remained in the Château de Dinan until 1949. It was then reassembled in 1949 by the Labouret workshop.

A large architectural niche in grisaille and silver yellow occupies each lancet. Coats of arms adorn the plinths and two of the lancet heads; the other four feature lily flowers. The coats of arms depicted on the lancet heads are those of Catherine de Kersaliou and her husband Henri du Parc de la Rochejagu, and on the plinths, those of Le Goalès (Le Gualès), Alain de Kernechriou, Jean le Caourcin de Kérambellec, Le Saint, Lezversault and Kergrist et Plusquellec. The background of the niches is richly damask, alternating blue and red. The lancets represent, from left to right, Saint Peter, the Calvary, Saint Catherine of Alexandria and Saint Margaret of Antioch or Saint Helen.

Lancet 1	Lancet 2	Lancet 3	Lancet 4	Lancet 5	Lancet 6
Lily flower.	Lily flower.	Catherine de Kersaliou's shield.	Shield of Henri du Parc de La Rochejagu, her husband.	Lily flower.	Lily flower.
Saint Peter.	Calvary: the Virgin Mary.	Calvary: Jesus Christ.	Calvary: Saint John.	Saint Catherine of Alexandria.	Saint Margaret of Antioche or saint Helena.
Le Goalès family shield.	Alain de Kernechriou's shield.	Jean Le Caourcin de Kérambellec's shield.	Le Saint's family shield.	Lezversault's family shield.	Kergrist and Plusquellec's half-partite shield.

The tympanum features, from top to bottom, an angel bearing the coat of arms of Brittany, followed by thurifer and musician angels, ornamental motifs, as well as once again the coat of arms of Brittany and a half-separated shield of Brittany and France, probably belonging to Joan of France, and finally floral motifs accompanying the coat of arms of Rostrenen, Jean du Perrier and his wife Constance Gaudin.

=== Other stained glass windows ===
The church's other windows are occupied by anonymous decorative grisailles.

== See also ==
- Gothic architecture
- Runan, Côtes-d'Armor

== Bibliography ==
- Bonnet, Philippe; Rioult, Jean-Jacques (2010). Picard (ed.). Bretagne gothique: l'architecture religieuse (in French). ISBN 978-2-7084-0883-8.
- Couffon, René (1950). "Runan". Congrès archéologique de France (in French). 107 (Société française d'archéologie ed.): 150–164.
- Durand, Gildas (1999). "Nouvelle théorie sur le retable de Runan. Ses conséquences pour la connaissance de l'art gothique breton". Les dossiers du Centre de Recherche et d'Archéologie d'Alet (in French) (19): 91–104.
- Gatouillat, Françoise; Hérold, Michel (2005). Presses universitaires de Rennes (ed.). Les vitraux de Bretagne (in French). pp. 95–96. ISBN 2-7535-0151-3.
- Lemaître, Stéven (2017). "Runan, église Notre-Dame-de-Miséricorde". Congrès archéologique de France (in French). 173 (Société française d'archéologie ed.): 313–326.
- Monnier, Louis (1900). "L'église de Runan, ses origines, son histoire". Revue de Bretagne, de Vendée et d'Anjou (in French). 24 (Société française d'archéologie ed.): 195.
- Ropartz, Sigismond (1854). "Notice sur Runan". Annuaire des Côtes d'Armor (in French): 195.
