= Runan (disambiguation) =

Runan County is an administrative region in Henan, China.

Runan may also refer to:

- Runan, Côtes-d'Armor, commune in France
- Runan Commandery, Chinese commandery from Han dynasty to Tang dynasty
- Princess Runan (c. 621–636 CE), royal princess of the Tang dynasty

== See also ==
- Wan Runnan (born 1946), Chinese software engineer, entrepreneur and human rights activist
