= Canton of Bégard =

Coordinates: 48.63°N 3.30°W

The canton of Bégard is an administrative division of the Côtes-d'Armor department, northwestern France. Its borders were modified at the French canton reorganisation which came into effect in March 2015. Its seat is in Bégard.

It consists of the following communes:

1. Bégard
2. Berhet
3. Brélidy
4. Caouënnec-Lanvézéac
5. Cavan
6. Coatascorn
7. Kermoroc'h
8. Landebaëron
9. Mantallot
10. Pédernec
11. Ploëzal
12. Plouëc-du-Trieux
13. Pluzunet
14. Pontrieux
15. Prat
16. Quemper-Guézennec
17. Quemperven
18. Runan
19. Saint-Clet
20. Saint-Laurent
21. Squiffiec
22. Tonquédec
23. Trégonneau
