= Cavan, Côtes-d'Armor =

Cavan Kawan
- Commune
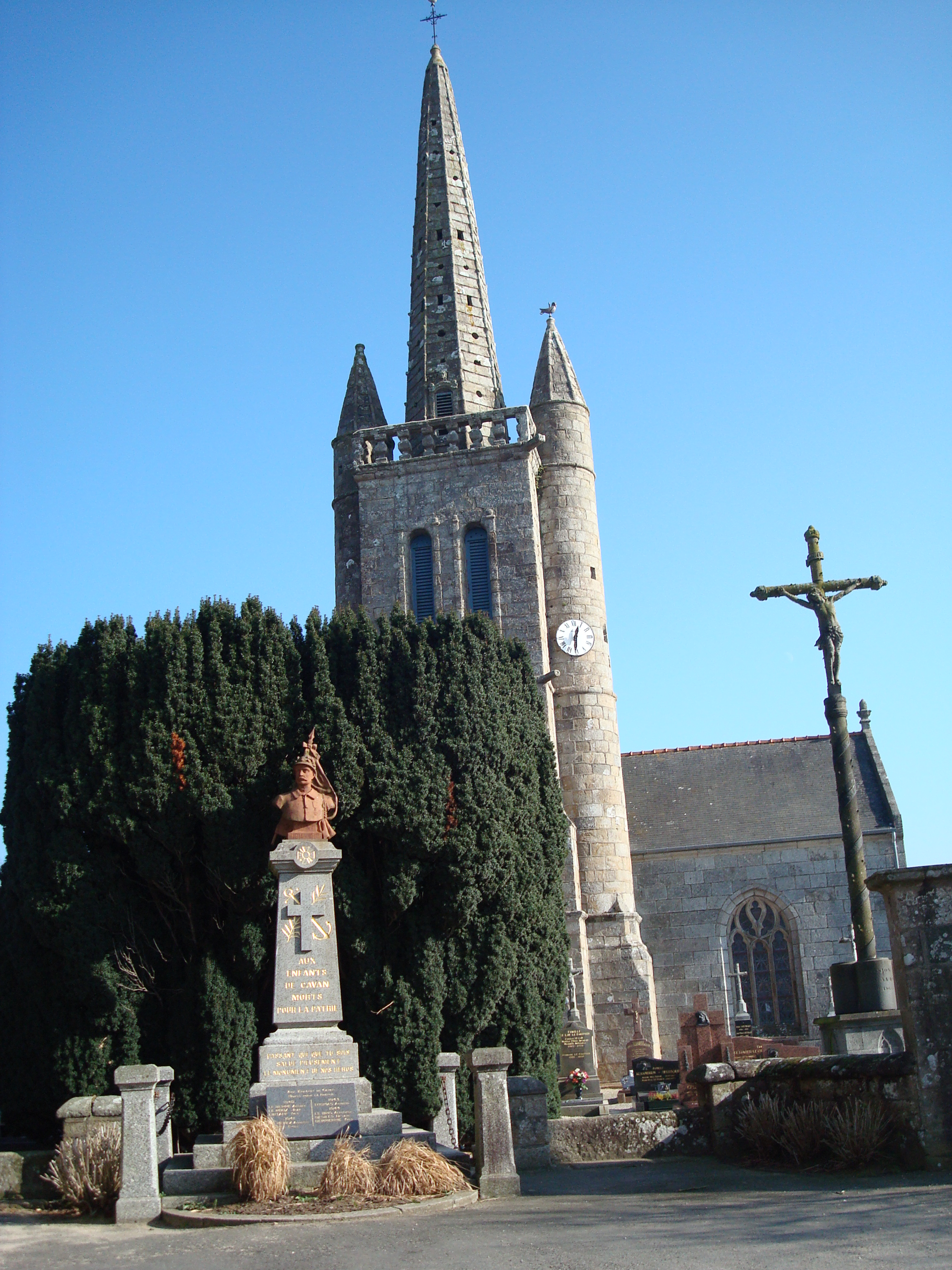
- The church of Cavan

- Coat of arms
- Location of Cavan
- Location within France Location within Brittany
- Coordinates: 48°40′22″N 3°20′35″W
- Country: France
- Region: Brittany
- Department: Côtes-d'Armor
- Arrondissement: Lannion
- Canton: Bégard
- Intercommunality: Lannion-Trégor Communauté

Government
  - Mayor (2020–2026): Maurice Offret
- Area^{1}: 16.40 km^{2} (6.33 sq mi)
- Highest elevation: 111 m (364 ft)
- Lowest elevation: 53 m (174 ft)
- Population (2023): 1,571
  - Density: 95.79/km^{2} (248.1/sq mi)
- Time zone: UTC+01:00 (CET)
  - Summer (DST): UTC+02:00 (CEST)
- INSEE/Postal code: 22034 /22140
- ^{1} French Land Register data, which excludes lakes, ponds, glaciers > 1 km^{2} (0.386 sq mi or 247 acres) and river estuaries.

Cavan (French pronunciation: [kavɑ̃]; Breton: Kawan) is a commune in the Côtes-d'Armor department of Brittany in northwestern France.

== Population ==
Historical population
| Year | Pop. | ±% p.a. |
|---|---|---|
| 1968 | 844 | — |
| 1975 | 854 | +0.17% |
| 1982 | 1,025 | +2.64% |
| 1990 | 1,080 | +0.66% |
| 1999 | 1,129 | +0.49% |
| 2007 | 1,378 | +2.52% |
| 2012 | 1,456 | +1.11% |
| 2017 | 1,564 | +1.44% |
| 2023 | 1,571 | +0.07% |
Source: INSEE

Inhabitants of Cavan are called Cavanais in French.

== Breton language ==
The municipality launched a linguistic plan through Ya d'ar brezhoneg on 27 May 2006.

In 2023, 44.3% of primary school children attended bilingual schools.

== See also ==
- Communes of the Côtes-d'Armor department
