= Quemper-Guézennec =

Quemper-Guézennec Kemper-Gwezhenneg
- Commune
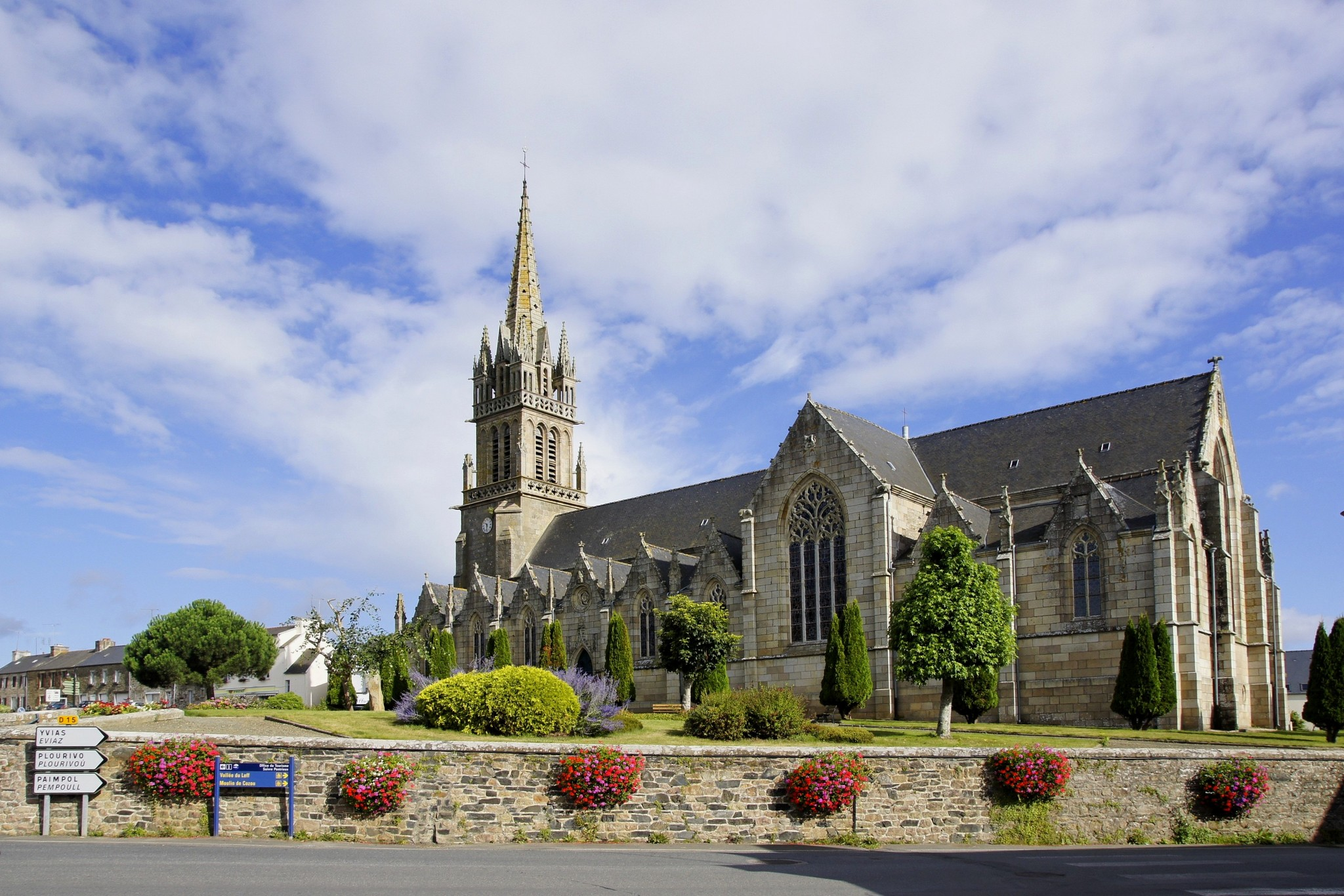
- The church of Saint-Pierre

- Coat of arms
- Location of Quemper-Guézennec
- Location within France Location within Brittany
- Coordinates: 48°42′08″N 3°06′15″W
- Country: France
- Region: Brittany
- Department: Côtes-d'Armor
- Arrondissement: Guingamp
- Canton: Bégard
- Intercommunality: Guingamp-Paimpol Agglomération

Government
  - Mayor (2020–2026): Gilbert Le Vaillant
- Area^{1}: 23.08 km^{2} (8.91 sq mi)
- Highest elevation: 98 m (322 ft)
- Lowest elevation: 2 m (6.6 ft)
- Population (2023): 1,118
  - Density: 48.44/km^{2} (125.5/sq mi)
- Time zone: UTC+01:00 (CET)
  - Summer (DST): UTC+02:00 (CEST)
- INSEE/Postal code: 22256 /22260
- ^{1} French Land Register data, which excludes lakes, ponds, glaciers > 1 km^{2} (0.386 sq mi or 247 acres) and river estuaries.

Quemper-Guézennec (French pronunciation: [kɛ̃pɛʁ ɡezɛnɛk]; Breton: Kemper-Gwezhenneg) is a commune in the Côtes-d'Armor department of Brittany in northwestern France.

== Population ==
Historical population
Year	Pop.	±% p.a.
1968	1,235	—
1975	1,180	−0.65%
1982	1,103	−0.96%
1990	1,029	−0.86%
1999	1,018	−0.12%
2007	1,060	+0.51%
2012	1,119	+1.09%
2017	1,094	−0.45%
2023	1,118	+0.36%
Source: INSEE

Inhabitants of Quemper-Guézennec are called quemperrois in French.

== See also ==
- Communes of the Côtes-d'Armor department
