= Prat, Côtes-d'Armor =

Prat Prad
- Commune
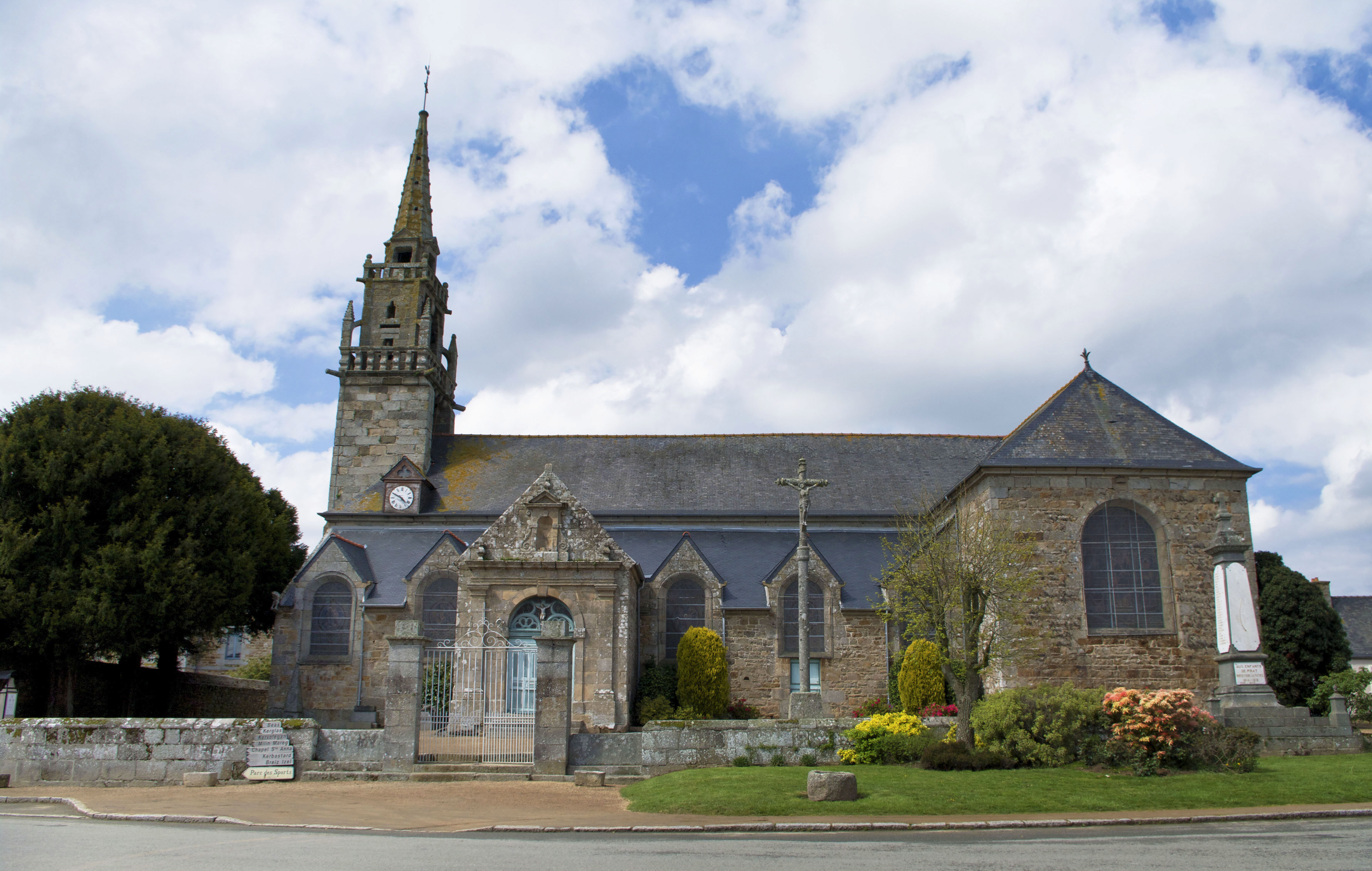
- The church of Saint-Pierre, in Prat
- Location of Prat
- Location within France Location within Brittany
- Coordinates: 48°40′39″N 3°17′47″W
- Country: France
- Region: Brittany
- Department: Côtes-d'Armor
- Arrondissement: Lannion
- Canton: Bégard
- Intercommunality: Lannion-Trégor Communauté

Government
  - Mayor (2020–2026): Michel Even
- Area^{1}: 21.87 km^{2} (8.44 sq mi)
- Highest elevation: 112 m (367 ft)
- Lowest elevation: 19 m (62 ft)
- Population (2023): 1,078
  - Density: 49.29/km^{2} (127.7/sq mi)
- Time zone: UTC+01:00 (CET)
  - Summer (DST): UTC+02:00 (CEST)
- INSEE/Postal code: 22254 /22140
- ^{1} French Land Register data, which excludes lakes, ponds, glaciers > 1 km^{2} (0.386 sq mi or 247 acres) and river estuaries.

Prat (French pronunciation: [pʁat]; Breton: Prad) is a commune in the Côtes-d'Armor department of Brittany in northwestern France.

== Population ==
Inhabitants of Prat are called pratais in French.

== Breton language ==
The municipality launched a linguistic plan through Ya d'ar brezhoneg on 27 May 2006.

== Sights ==
The fifteenth century Trévoazan church collapsed in the 1910s and was designated as a historic landmark in 1926. The remains of the frontage and the tower can still be seen. The Manoir de Coatelan, also from the fifteenth century, was classified as a historic monument in 1927.

== See also ==
- Communes of the Côtes-d'Armor department
