= Brélidy =

Brélidy Brelidi
- Commune
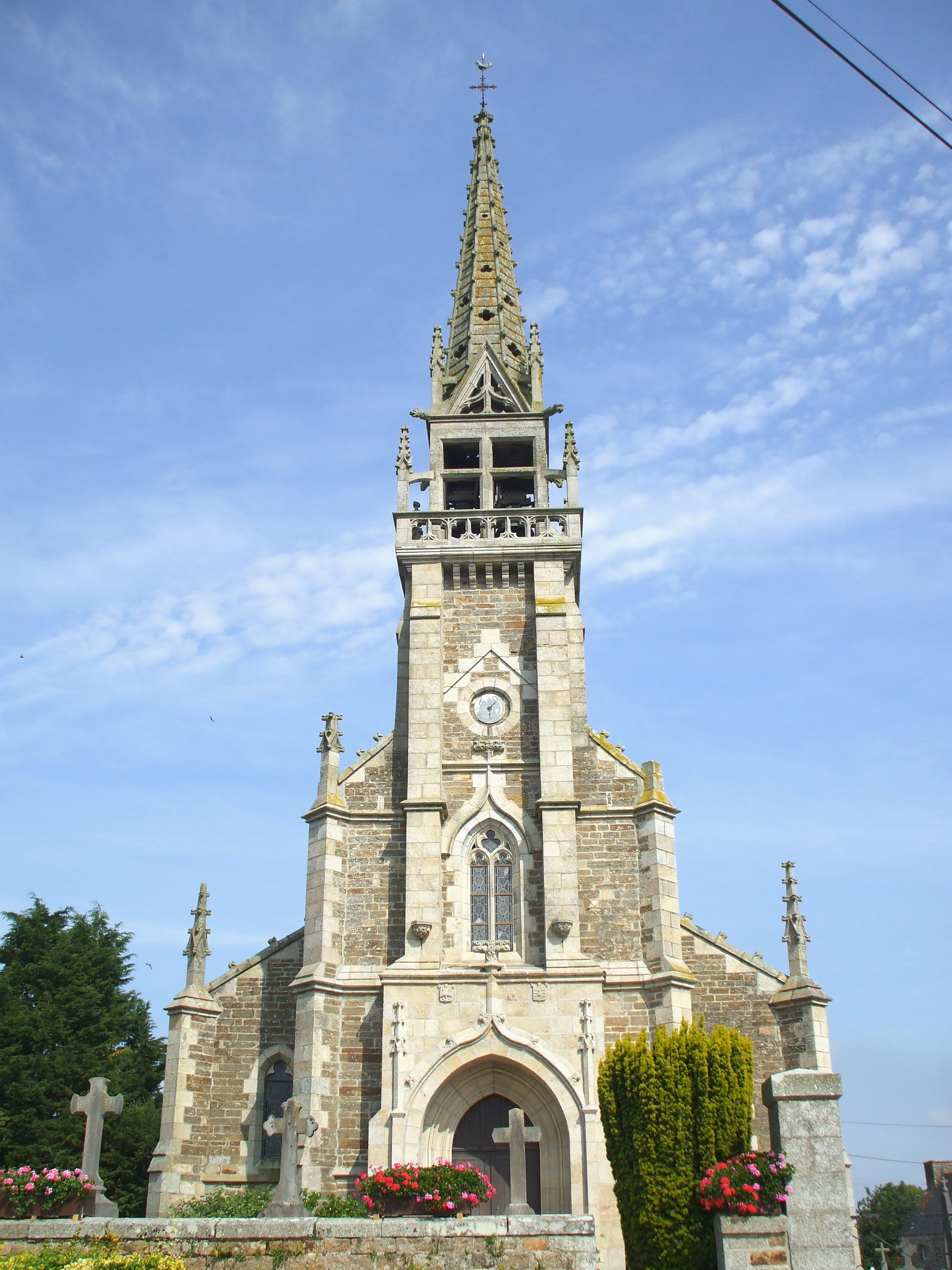
- Church of St. Columban
- Location of Brélidy
- Location within France Location within Brittany
- Coordinates: 48°39′37″N 3°13′01″W
- Country: France
- Region: Brittany
- Department: Côtes-d'Armor
- Arrondissement: Guingamp
- Canton: Bégard
- Intercommunality: Guingamp-Paimpol Agglomération

Government
  - Mayor (2020–2026): Pierre-Marie Garel
- Area^{1}: 8.14 km^{2} (3.14 sq mi)
- Highest elevation: 111 m (364 ft)
- Lowest elevation: 35 m (115 ft)
- Population (2023): 334
  - Density: 41.0/km^{2} (106/sq mi)
- Time zone: UTC+01:00 (CET)
  - Summer (DST): UTC+02:00 (CEST)
- INSEE/Postal code: 22018 /22140
- ^{1} French Land Register data, which excludes lakes, ponds, glaciers > 1 km^{2} (0.386 sq mi or 247 acres) and river estuaries.

Brélidy (French pronunciation: [bʁelidi]; Breton: Brelidi) is a commune in the Côtes-d'Armor department of Brittany in northwestern France.

== Population ==
Historical population
Year	Pop.	±% p.a.
1968	357	—
1975	316	−1.73%
1982	336	+0.88%
1990	325	−0.42%
1999	335	+0.34%
2007	305	−1.17%
2012	303	−0.13%
2017	297	−0.40%
2023	334	+1.98%
Source: INSEE

Inhabitants of Brélidy are called Brélidiens in French.

== See also ==
- Communes of the Côtes-d'Armor department
