= Bégard =

Bégard Bear
- Commune
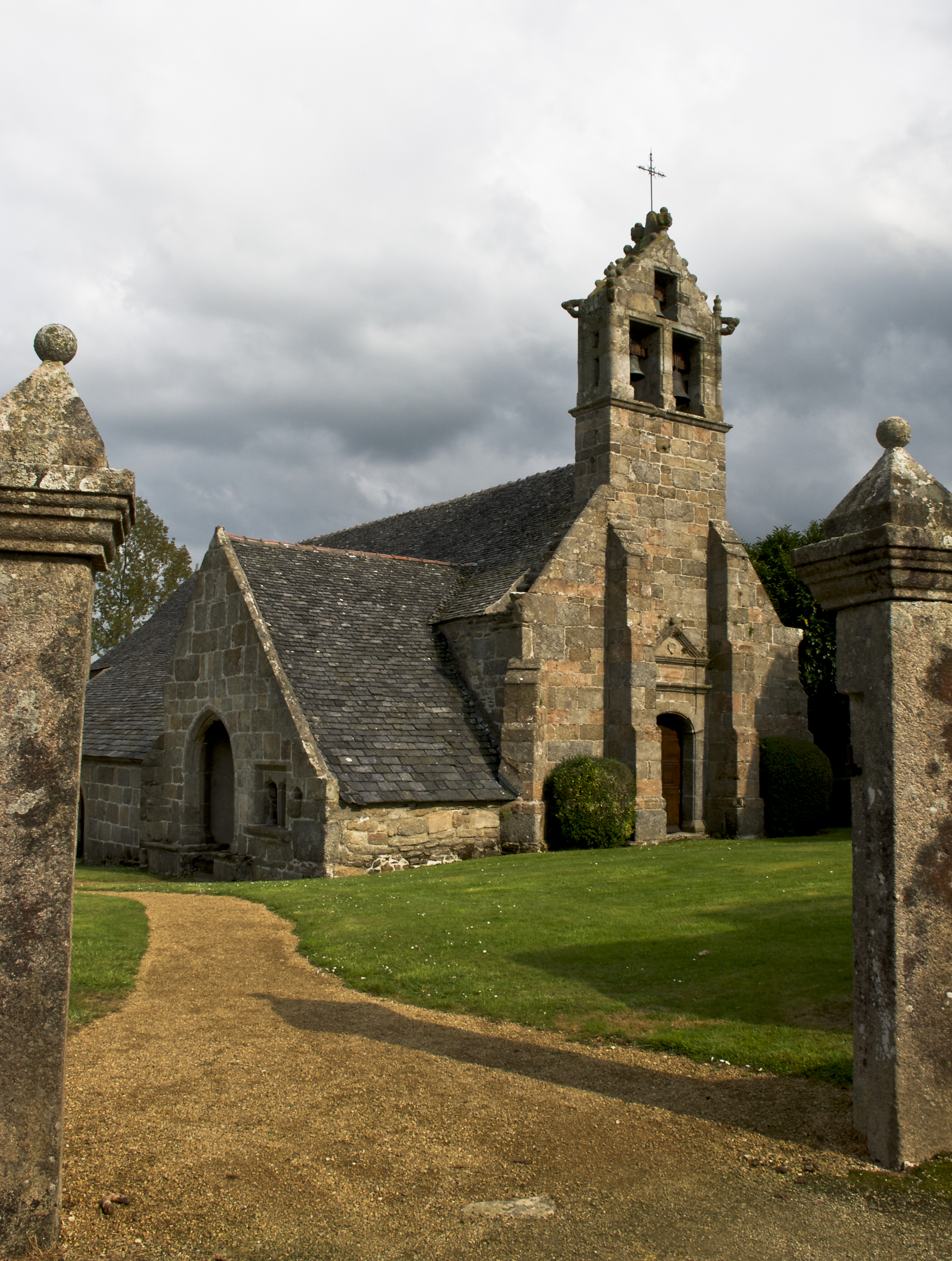
- Church of Guénézan

- Flag Coat of arms
- Location of Bégard
- Location within France Location within Brittany
- Coordinates: 48°37′43″N 3°17′59″W
- Country: France
- Region: Brittany
- Department: Côtes-d'Armor
- Arrondissement: Guingamp
- Canton: Bégard
- Intercommunality: Guingamp-Paimpol Agglomération

Government
  - Mayor (2020–2026): Vincent Clec'h
- Area^{1}: 36.41 km^{2} (14.06 sq mi)
- Highest elevation: 176 m (577 ft)
- Lowest elevation: 45 m (148 ft)
- Population (2023): 4,889
  - Density: 134.3/km^{2} (347.8/sq mi)
- Time zone: UTC+01:00 (CET)
  - Summer (DST): UTC+02:00 (CEST)
- INSEE/Postal code: 22004 /22140
- ^{1} French Land Register data, which excludes lakes, ponds, glaciers > 1 km^{2} (0.386 sq mi or 247 acres) and river estuaries.

Bégard (French pronunciation: [beɡaʁ]; Breton: Bear) is a commune in the Côtes-d'Armor department in Brittany in northwestern France.

== Population ==
Inhabitants of Bégard are called Bégarrois in French.

Historical population

Year	Pop.	±% p.a.
1793	528	—
1800	2,394	+24.10%
1806	3,417	+6.11%
1821	3,727	+0.58%
1831	3,768	+0.11%
1836	3,503	−1.45%
1841	3,821	+1.75%
1846	4,180	+1.81%
1851	4,053	−0.62%
1856	3,960	−0.46%
1861	4,182	+1.10%
1866	3,281	−4.74%
1872	4,518	+5.48%
1876	4,758	+1.30%
1881	4,715	−0.18%
1886	4,713	−0.01%
1891	4,924	+0.88%
1896	4,919	−0.02%
1901	4,915	−0.02%

Year	Pop.	±% p.a.
1906	5,053	+0.56%
1911	4,777	−1.12%
1921	4,311	−1.02%
1926	4,555	+1.11%
1931	4,464	−0.40%
1936	4,773	+1.35%
1946	4,285	−1.07%
1954	4,431	+0.42%
1962	4,719	+0.79%
1968	4,976	+0.89%
1975	5,152	+0.50%
1982	5,180	+0.08%
1990	4,906	−0.68%
1999	4,474	−1.02%
2007	4,562	+0.24%
2012	4,803	+1.03%
2017	4,808	+0.02%
2023	4,889	+0.28%

Source: EHESS and INSEE (1968–2023)

== Breton language ==
The municipality launched a linguistic plan through Ya d'ar brezhoneg on 25 October 2004.

In 2008, 5.89% of the primary school children attended the bilingual schools.

== Twinning ==
Bégard is twinned with St Asaph in Wales.

== See also ==
- Communes of the Côtes-d'Armor department
