= Plouëc-du-Trieux =

Plouëc-du-Trieux Ploueg-Pontrev
- Commune
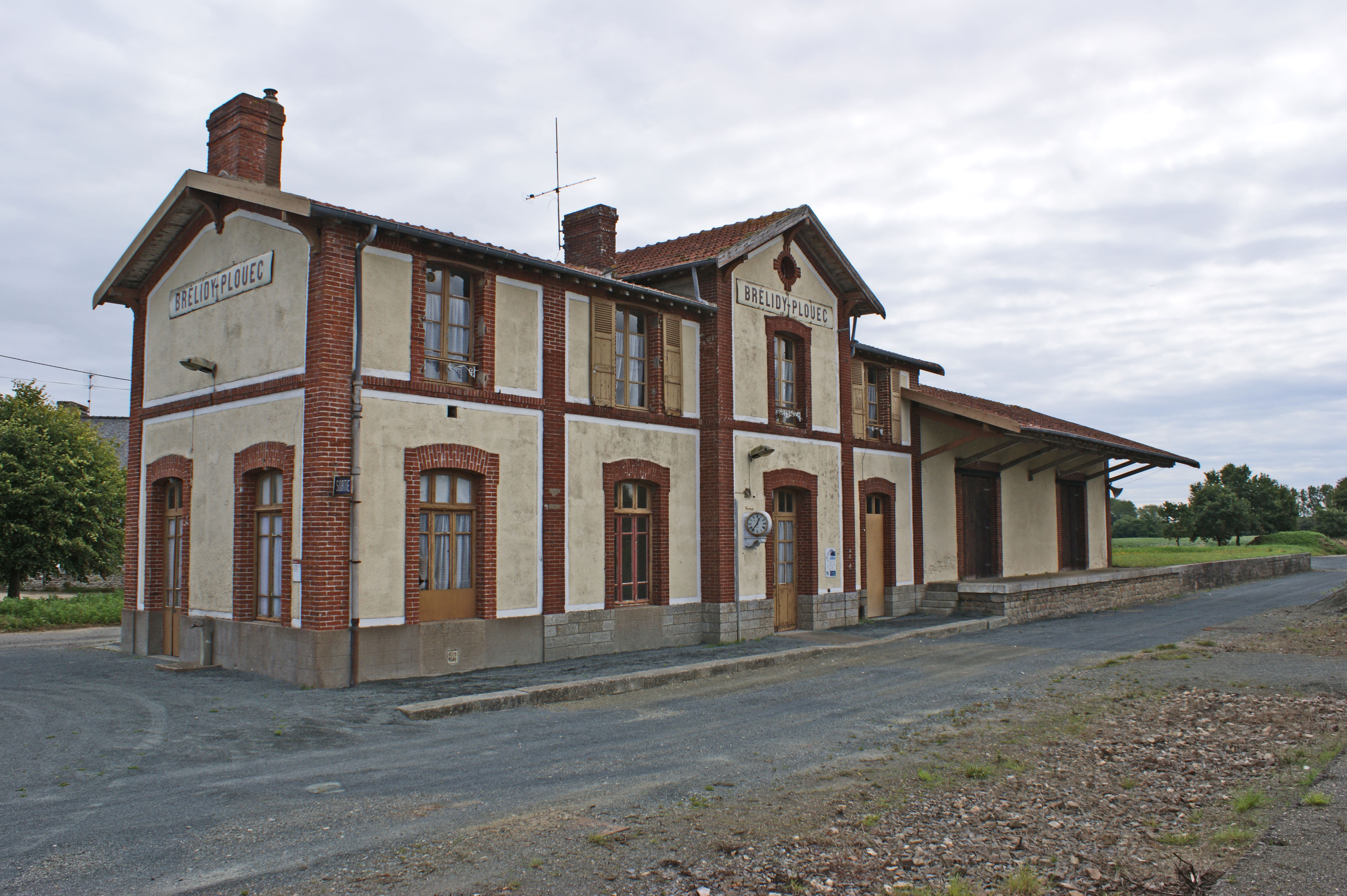
- Train station

- Coat of arms
- Location of Plouëc-du-Trieux
- Location within France Location within Brittany
- Coordinates: 48°40′29″N 3°11′26″W
- Country: France
- Region: Brittany
- Department: Côtes-d'Armor
- Arrondissement: Guingamp
- Canton: Bégard
- Intercommunality: Guingamp-Paimpol Agglomération

Government
  - Mayor (2020–2026): Vincent Le Meaux
- Area^{1}: 18.27 km^{2} (7.05 sq mi)
- Highest elevation: 104 m (341 ft)
- Lowest elevation: 7 m (23 ft)
- Population (2023): 1,140
  - Density: 62.4/km^{2} (162/sq mi)
- Time zone: UTC+01:00 (CET)
  - Summer (DST): UTC+02:00 (CEST)
- INSEE/Postal code: 22212 /22260
- ^{1} French Land Register data, which excludes lakes, ponds, glaciers > 1 km^{2} (0.386 sq mi or 247 acres) and river estuaries.

Plouëc-du-Trieux (French pronunciation: [pluɛk dy tʁijø]; Breton: Ploueg-Pontrev, before 1962: Plouëc) is a commune in the Côtes-d'Armor department of Brittany in northwestern France.

== Population ==
Historical population
Year	Pop.	±% p.a.
1968	1,280	—
1975	1,105	−2.08%
1982	1,106	+0.01%
1990	1,087	−0.22%
1999	1,085	−0.02%
2007	1,126	+0.46%
2012	1,108	−0.32%
2017	1,134	+0.46%
2023	1,140	+0.09%
Source: INSEE

Inhabitants of Plouëc-du-Trieux are called plouëcois in French.

== See also ==
- Communes of the Côtes-d'Armor department
