= Saint-Laurent, Côtes-d'Armor =

Saint-Laurent Sant-Laorañs
- Commune
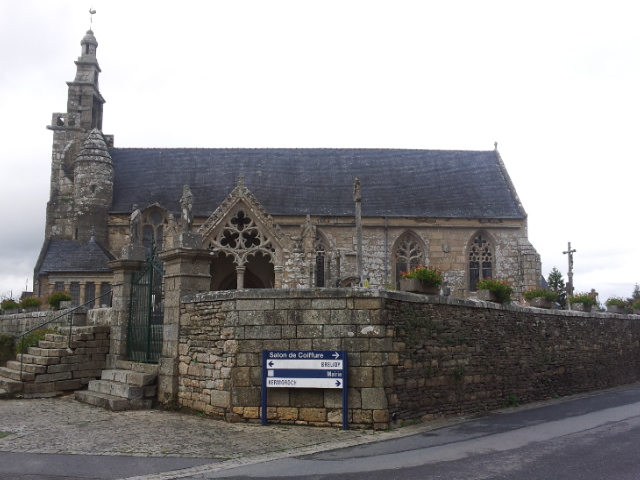
- The church of Saint-Laurent
- Location of Saint-Laurent
- Location within France Location within Brittany
- Coordinates: 48°37′11″N 3°13′53″W
- Country: France
- Region: Brittany
- Department: Côtes-d'Armor
- Arrondissement: Guingamp
- Canton: Bégard
- Intercommunality: Guingamp-Paimpol Agglomération

Government
  - Mayor (2020–2026): Annie Le Gall
- Area^{1}: 8.96 km^{2} (3.46 sq mi)
- Highest elevation: 155 m (509 ft)
- Lowest elevation: 55 m (180 ft)
- Population (2023): 541
  - Density: 60.4/km^{2} (156/sq mi)
- Time zone: UTC+01:00 (CET)
  - Summer (DST): UTC+02:00 (CEST)
- INSEE/Postal code: 22310 /22140
- ^{1} French Land Register data, which excludes lakes, ponds, glaciers > 1 km^{2} (0.386 sq mi or 247 acres) and river estuaries.

Saint-Laurent (French pronunciation: [sɛ̃ loʁɑ̃]; Breton: Sant-Laorañs) is a commune in the Côtes-d'Armor department of the region of Brittany in northwestern France.

== Population ==
Inhabitants of Saint-Laurent are called saint-laurentais in French.

Historical population
Year	Pop.	±% p.a.
1968	333	—
1975	330	−0.13%
1982	361	+1.29%
1990	437	+2.42%
1999	418	−0.49%
2007	428	+0.30%
2012	515	+3.77%
2017	487	−1.11%
2023	541	+1.77%
Source: INSEE

== See also ==
- Communes of the Côtes-d'Armor department
