= Runan, Côtes-d'Armor =

Runan
- Commune
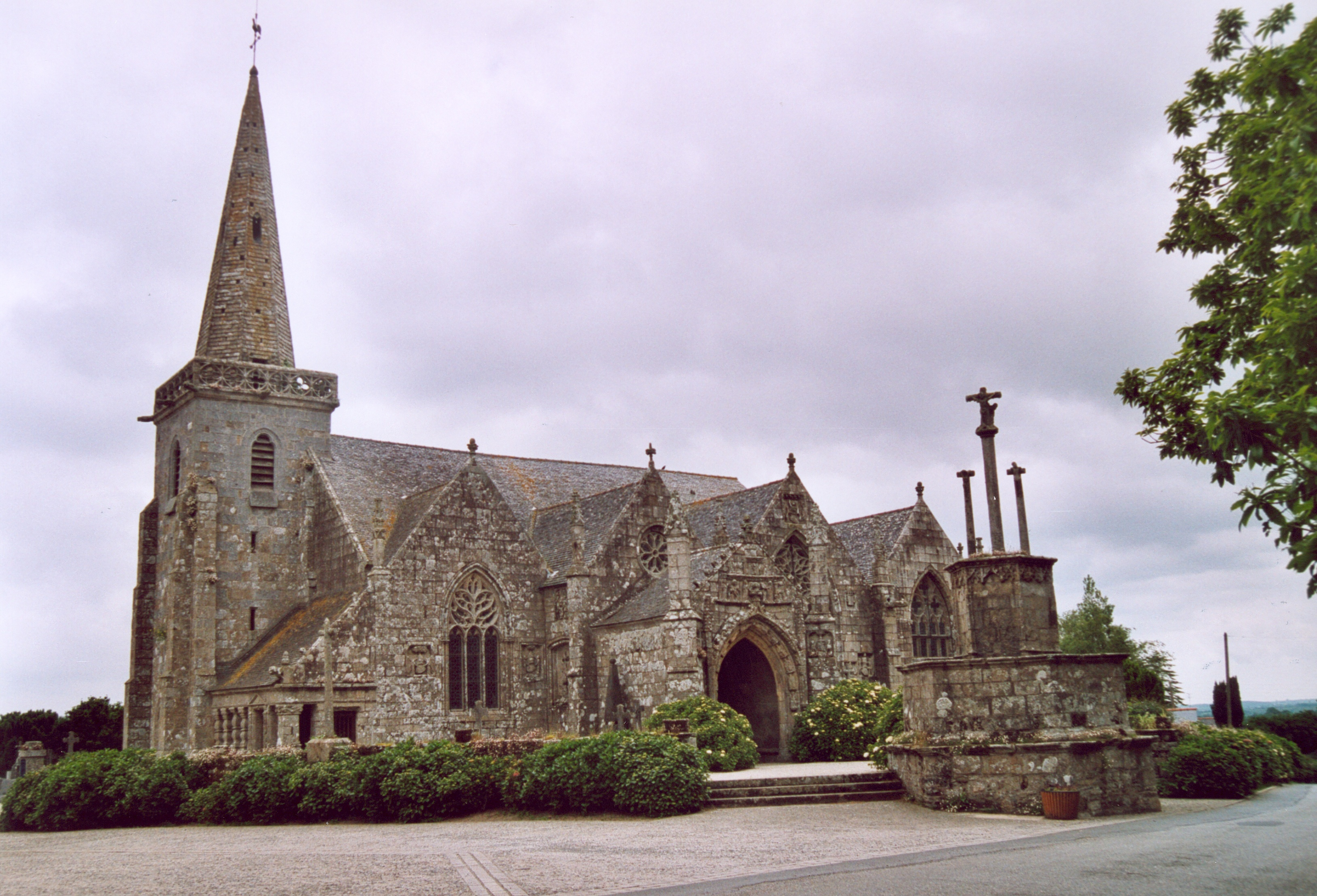
- The church of Notre Dame, in Runan
- Location of Runan
- Location within France Location within Brittany
- Coordinates: 48°41′38″N 3°12′37″W
- Country: France
- Region: Brittany
- Department: Côtes-d'Armor
- Arrondissement: Guingamp
- Canton: Bégard
- Intercommunality: Guingamp-Paimpol Agglomération

Government
  - Mayor (2020–2026): Yvon Le Bianic
- Area^{1}: 5.12 km^{2} (1.98 sq mi)
- Highest elevation: 102 m (335 ft)
- Lowest elevation: 25 m (82 ft)
- Population (2023): 245
  - Density: 47.9/km^{2} (124/sq mi)
- Time zone: UTC+01:00 (CET)
  - Summer (DST): UTC+02:00 (CEST)
- INSEE/Postal code: 22269 /22260
- ^{1} French Land Register data, which excludes lakes, ponds, glaciers > 1 km^{2} (0.386 sq mi or 247 acres) and river estuaries.

Runan (French pronunciation: [ʁynɑ̃]; Breton: Runan) is a commune in the Côtes-d'Armor department of Brittany in northwestern France.

== Population ==
Historical population
Year	Pop.	±% p.a.
1968	276	—
1975	241	−1.92%
1982	225	−0.98%
1990	227	+0.11%
1999	225	−0.10%
2007	249	+1.27%
2012	241	−0.65%
2017	240	−0.08%
2023	245	+0.34%
Source: INSEE

== See also ==
- Communes of the Côtes-d'Armor department
- Church of Notre-Dame de Runan
