= Rennes =

Prefecture and commune in Brittany, France

Rennes Resnn (Gallo) Roazhon (Breton)
- Prefecture and commune
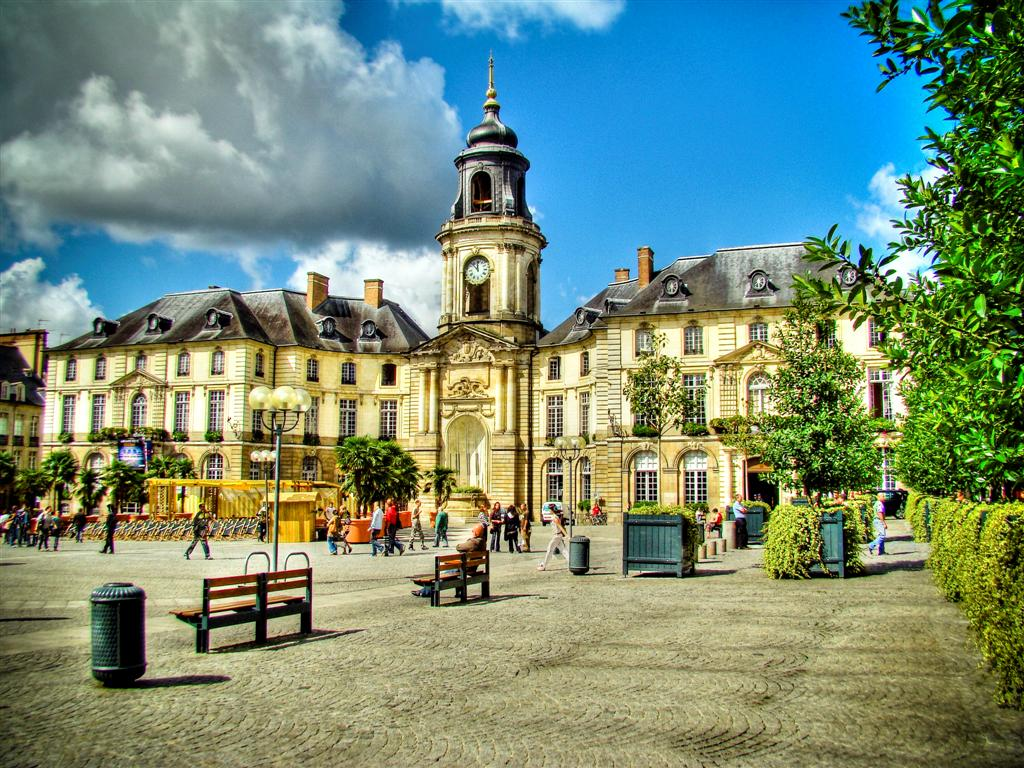
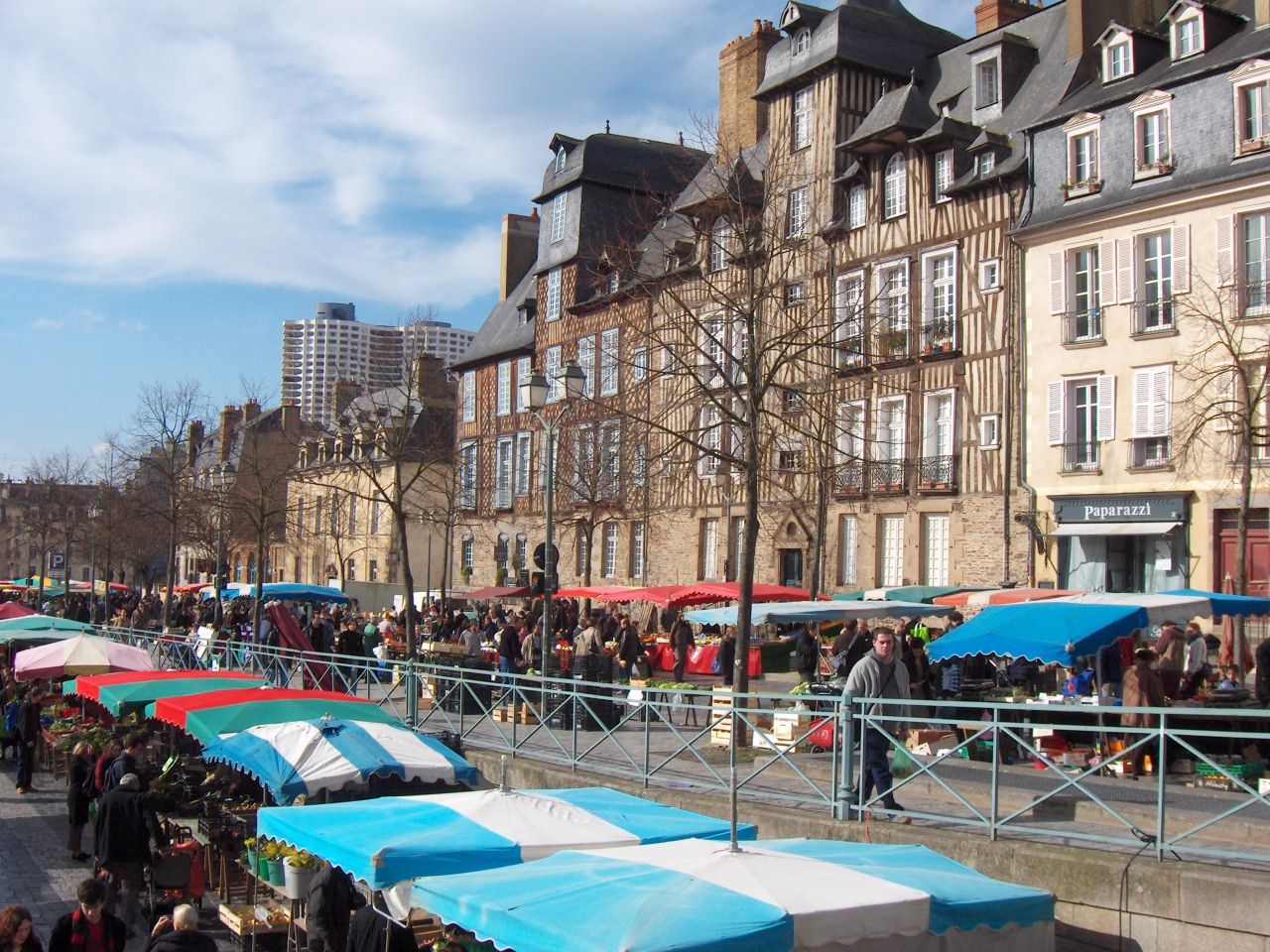
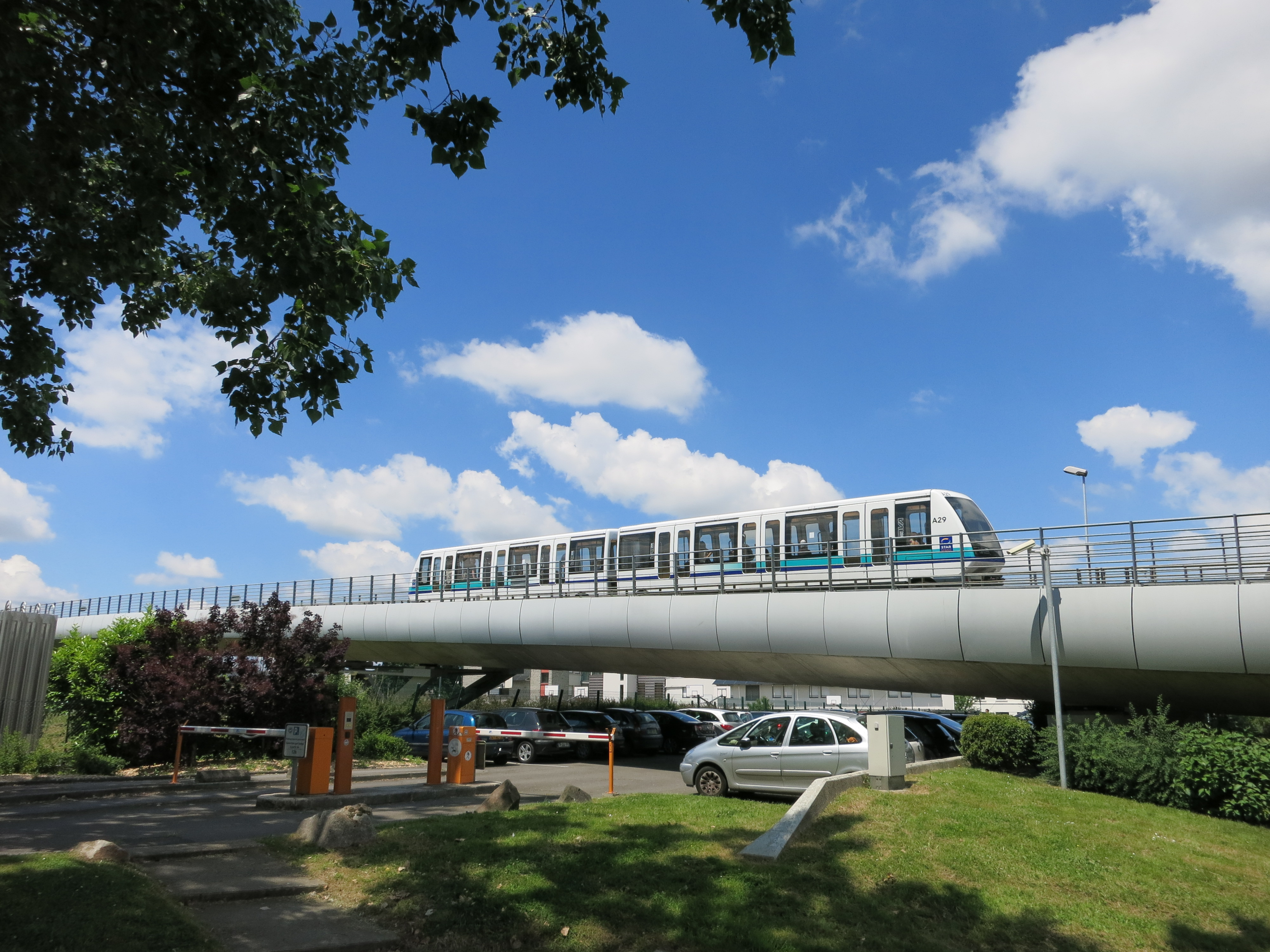
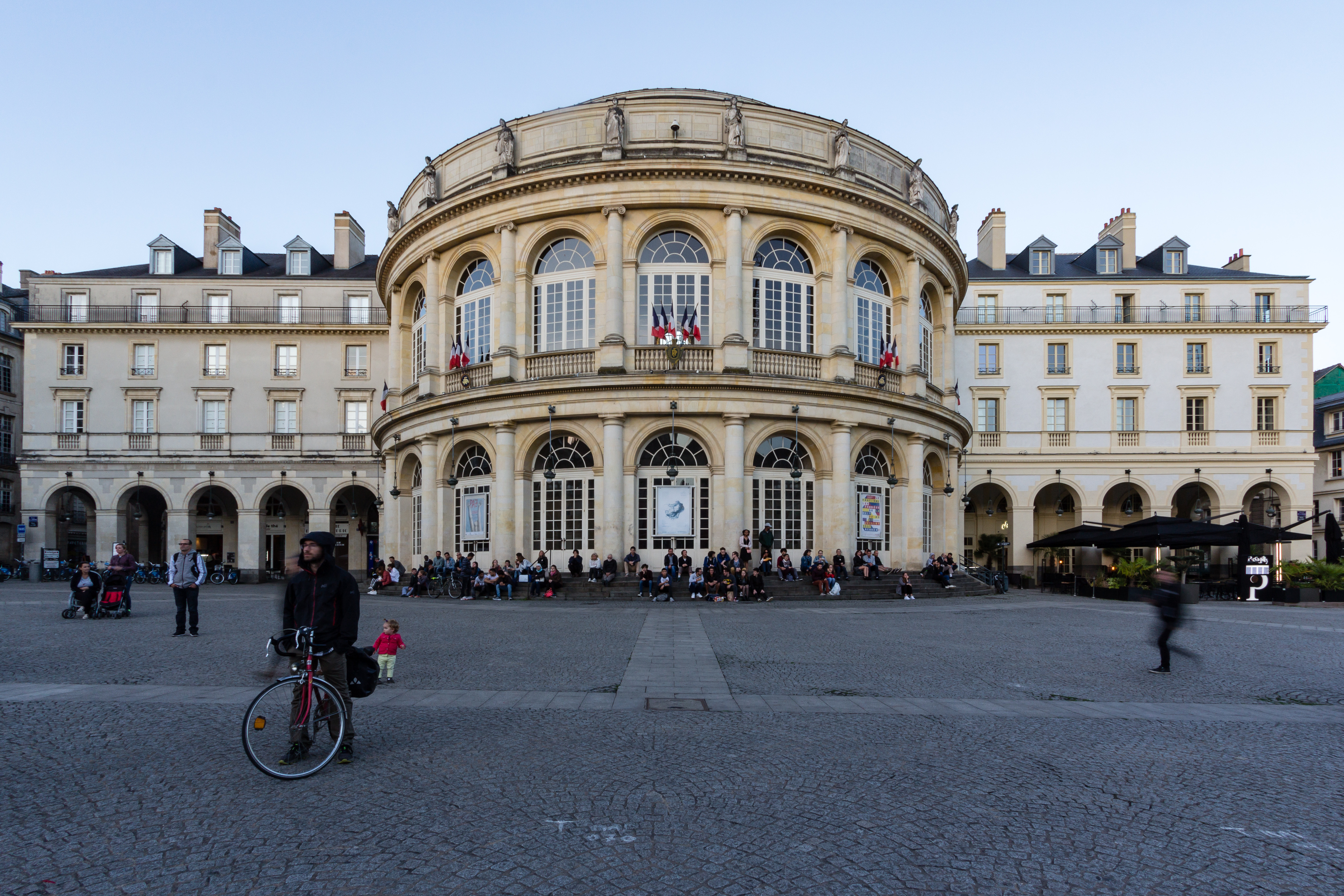
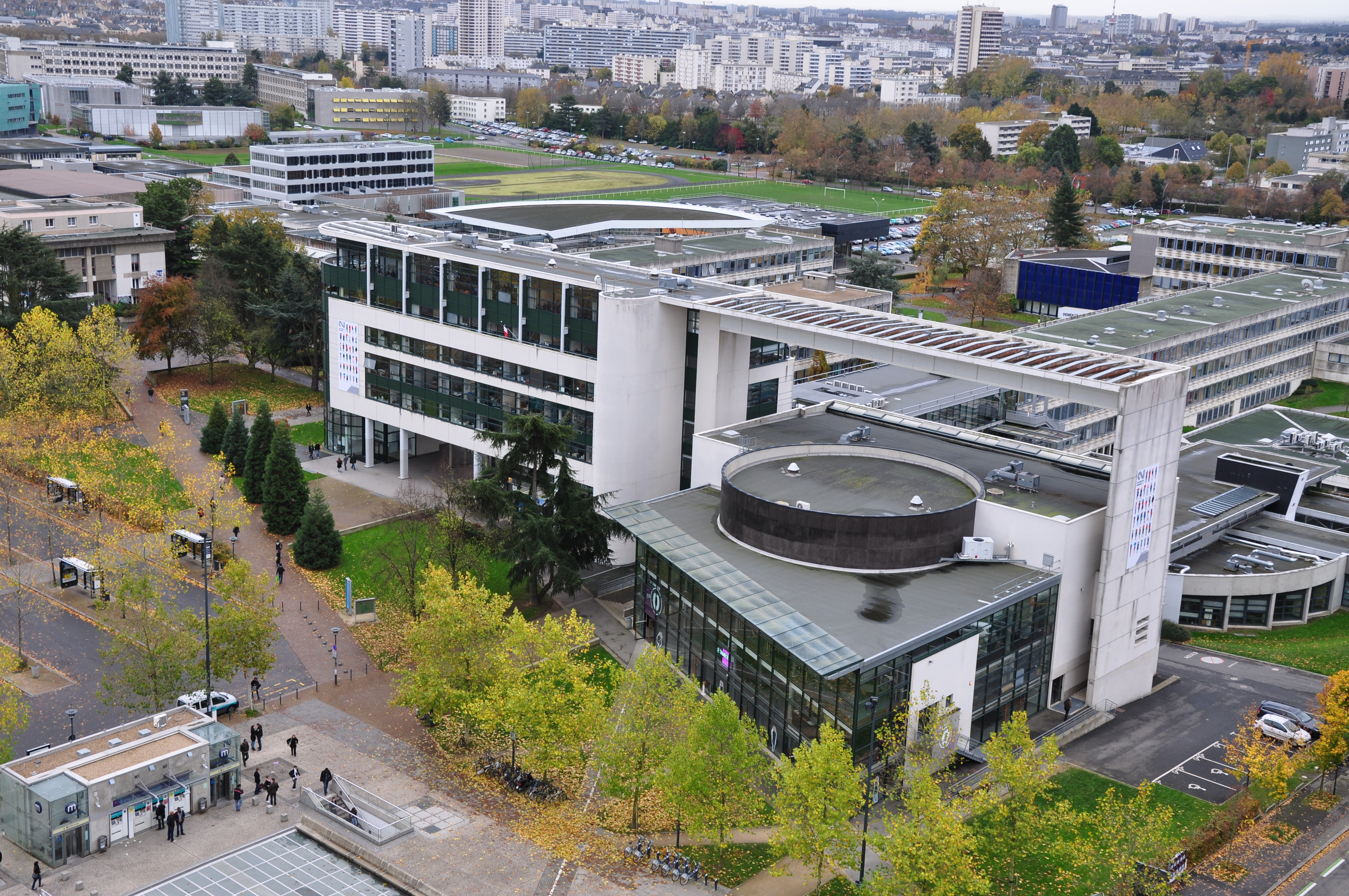
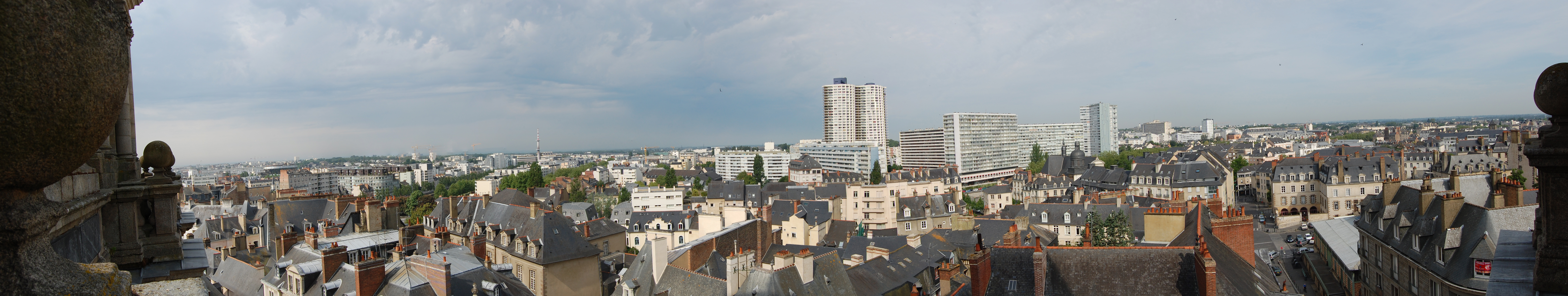
- Top to bottom, left to right: Place de la Mairie; Marché des Lices; Rennes Metro; Esplanade Charles de Gaulle; Opera of Rennes; University of Rennes 2; and skyline of Rennes from Cathedral

- Flag Coat of arms
- Motto(s): Vivre en intelligence (French for 'Live in harmony')
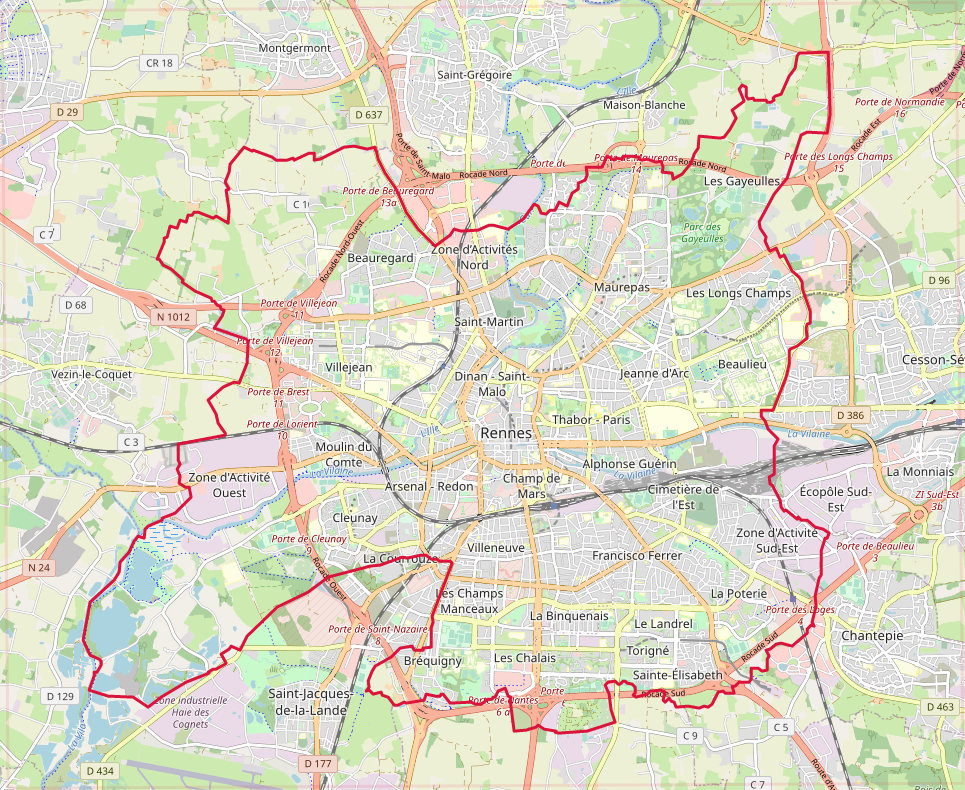
- Location of Rennes
- Location within France Location within Brittany
- Coordinates: 48°06′53″N 1°40′46″W
- Country: France
- Region: Brittany
- Department: Ille-et-Vilaine
- Arrondissement: Rennes
- Canton: Rennes-1, 2, 3, 4, 5 and 6
- Intercommunality: Rennes Métropole

Government
  - Mayor (2026–32): Nathalie Appéré (PS)
- Area^{1}: 50.39 km^{2} (19.46 sq mi)
  - Urban: 327.7 km^{2} (126.5 sq mi)
  - Metro: 3,804.3 km^{2} (1,468.8 sq mi)
- Elevation: 30 m (98 ft)
- Highest elevation: 74 m (243 ft)
- Lowest elevation: 20 m (66 ft)
- Population (2023): 230,890
  - Density: 4,582/km^{2} (11,870/sq mi)
  - Urban (2023): 381,156
  - Urban density: 1,163/km^{2} (3,012/sq mi)
  - Metro (2023): 789,516
  - Metro density: 207.53/km^{2} (537.51/sq mi)
- Demonym: Rennais(e)
- Time zone: UTC+01:00 (CET)
  - Summer (DST): UTC+02:00 (CEST)
- INSEE/Postal code: 35238 /35000, 35200, 35700
- ^{1} French Land Register data, which excludes lakes, ponds, glaciers > 1 km^{2} (0.386 sq mi or 247 acres) and river estuaries.

Rennes (French: [ʁɛn]) is a city in the east of Brittany in Northwestern France at the confluence of the rivers Ille and Vilaine. Rennes is the prefecture of the Brittany region and Ille-et-Vilaine department. In 2023, the city had a population of 230,890 inhabitants, while the larger metropolitan area is the 10th most populated in France with a population of 789,516. The inhabitants of Rennes are called Rennais (masculine) and Rennaises (feminine) in French.

Rennes's history goes back more than 2,000 years to a time when it was a small Gallican village named "Condate." Together with Vannes and Nantes, it was one of the major cities of the ancient Duchy of Brittany. From the early sixteenth century until the French Revolution, Rennes was a parliamentary, administrative and garrison city of the historic province of Brittany in the Kingdom of France, as evidenced by its 17th-century Parliament's Palace. Rennes played an important role in the Stamped Paper Revolt (Revolt of the papier timbré) in 1675. After the destructive fire of 1720, the medieval wooden center of the city was partially rebuilt in stone. Remaining mostly rural until the Second World War, Rennes underwent significant development in the twentieth century.

Since the 1950s, Rennes has grown in importance through rural flight and modern industrial development, partly in the automotive sector. The city developed extensive building plans to accommodate upwards of 200,000 inhabitants. During the 1980s, Rennes became one of the main centres in telecommunications and high-tech industry. It is now a significant digital innovation centre in France. From 2002 to 2008, Rennes was the smallest city in the world to have a metro.

Labeled a city of art and history, it has preserved an important medieval and classical heritage within its historic center, with over 90 buildings protected as historic monuments. Home to more than 70,000 students in 2026, it is also the eighth-largest university campus of France. In 2018, L'Express named Rennes as the most liveable city in France.

== Administration ==
Since 2015, Rennes is divided into 6 cantons (populations as of 2019):

- Canton of Rennes-1 (40,588 inhabitants)
- Canton of Rennes-2 (42,446 inhabitants)
- Canton of Rennes-3 (43,683 inhabitants), which includes parts of Rennes but also the commune of Chantepie
- Canton of Rennes-4 (36,348 inhabitants)
- Canton of Rennes-5 (46,759 inhabitants), which includes parts of Rennes but also the commune of Saint-Jacques-de-la-Lande
- Canton of Rennes-6 (46,750 inhabitants), which includes parts of Rennes but also the commune of Pacé

Rennes quarters

Rennes is divided into 12 quarters:

1. Centre
2. Thabor - Saint-Hélier - Alphonse Guérin
3. Bourg L’Évesque - La Touche - Moulin du Comte
4. Saint-Martin
5. Maurepas - Bellangerais
6. Jeanne d’Arc - Longs Champs - Atalante Beaulieu
7. La Pommeraie
8. Sud Gare
9. Cleunay - Arsenal - Redon - La Courrouze
10. Villejean - Beauregard
11. Le Blosne
12. Bréquigny

=== Mayors ===
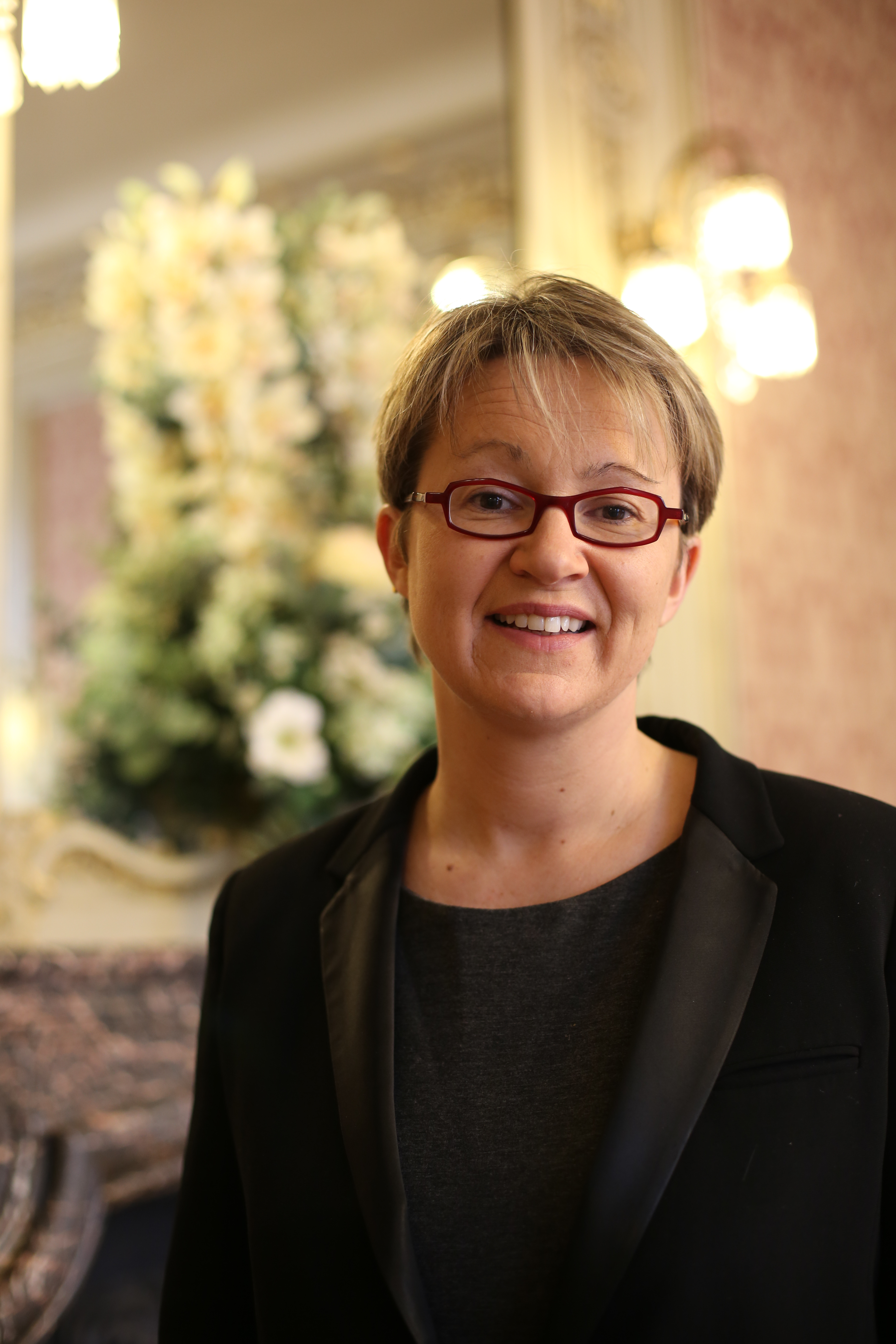
Nathalie Appéré, current mayor of Rennes

The current mayor of Rennes is Nathalie Appéré. A member of the Socialist Party, she replaced retiring Socialist incumbent Daniel Delaveau, in office from 2008 to 2014.

- Edmond Hervé (b. 1942), Socialist mayor from 1977 to 2008;
- Henri Fréville (1905–1987), mayor MRP from 1953 to 1977;
- Eugène Quessot (1882–1949), interim mayor from 15 July 1947 until 26 October 1947;
- Yves Milon (1897–1987), mayor RPF from 1944 to 1953.

Among previous well-known mayors are:

- Jean Janvier (1859–1923), from 1908 to 1923;
- Edgar Le Bastard (1836–1891), from 1880 to 1891;
- Toussaint-François Rallier du Baty (1665–1734) from 1695 to 1734.

The mairie (city hall) is right in the centre of Rennes.

=== National representation ===
The French Prison Service operates the Centre pénitentiaire de Rennes, the largest women's prison in France.

== Geography ==
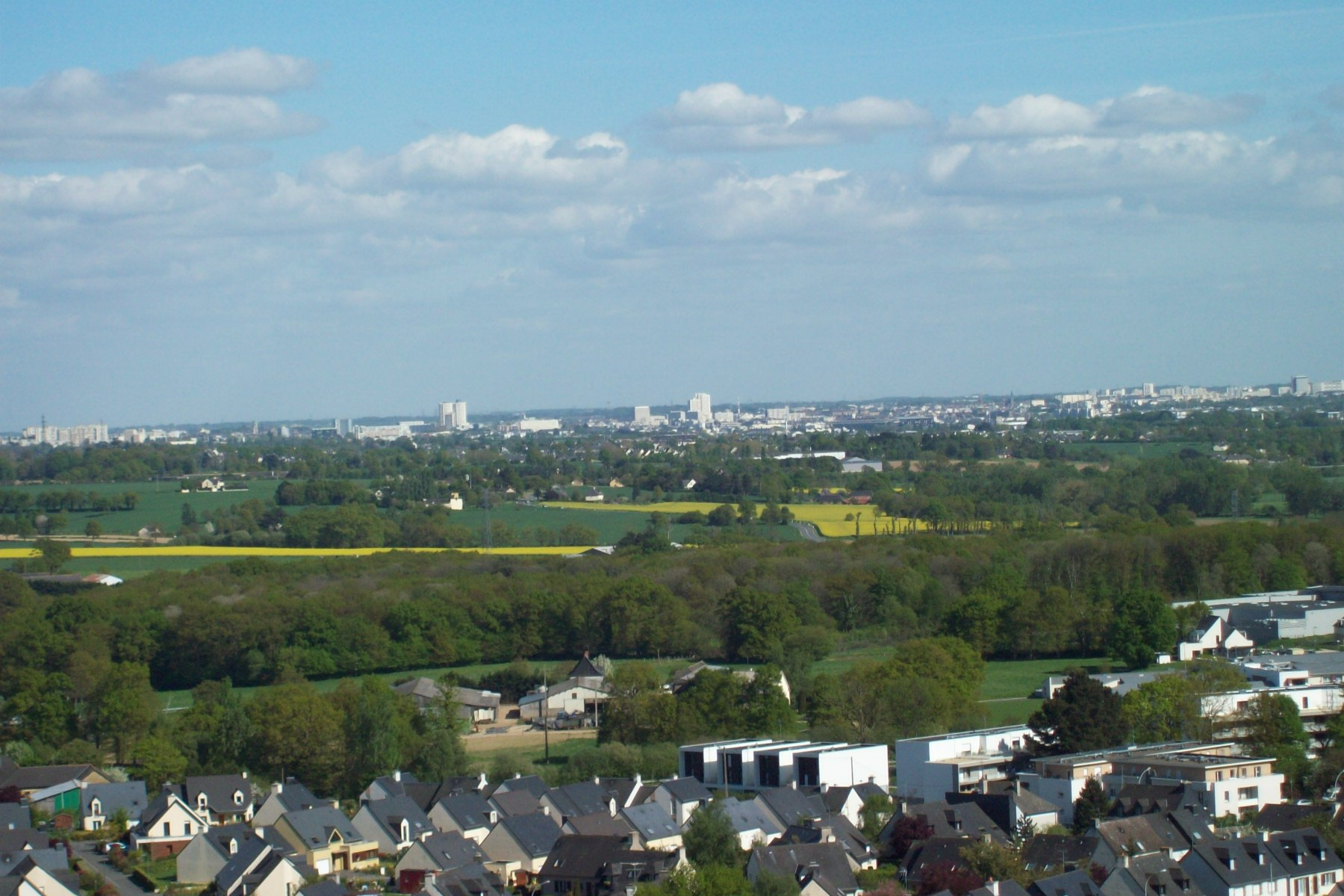
Green Belt between Rennes and L'Hermitage

The ancient centre of the town is built on a hill, with the north side being more elevated than the south side. It is at the confluence of two rivers: the Ille and the Vilaine.

Rennes is located on the European atlantic arc, 50 km from the English Channel (near Saint-Malo, Dinard, and Mont Saint-Michel).

Rennes has the distinction of having a significant Green Belt around its ring road. This Green Belt is a protected area between the city proper (rather dense) and the rest of its urban area (rather rural).

=== Climate ===
Rennes features an oceanic climate. Precipitation in Rennes is considerably less abundant than in the western parts of Brittany, reaching only half of the levels of, e.g., the city of Quimper, which makes rainfall in Rennes comparable to the levels of large parts of western Germany. Sunshine hours range between 1,700 and 1,850 annually, which is about the amount of sunshine received by the city of Lausanne.

Climate data for Rennes (RNS), elevation: 36 m (118 ft), 1991–2020 normals, extremes 1945–present
Month	Jan	Feb	Mar	Apr	May	Jun	Jul	Aug	Sep	Oct	Nov	Dec	Year
Record high °C (°F)	16.8 (62.2)	20.9 (69.6)	24.1 (75.4)	28.7 (83.7)	31.1 (88.0)	41.5 (106.7)	40.5 (104.9)	39.5 (103.1)	35.1 (95.2)	30.0 (86.0)	21.4 (70.5)	18.0 (64.4)	41.5 (106.7)
Mean daily maximum °C (°F)	9.2 (48.6)	10.2 (50.4)	13.2 (55.8)	16.0 (60.8)	19.3 (66.7)	22.6 (72.7)	24.8 (76.6)	24.7 (76.5)	21.9 (71.4)	17.2 (63.0)	12.5 (54.5)	9.6 (49.3)	16.8 (62.2)
Daily mean °C (°F)	6.2 (43.2)	6.6 (43.9)	8.8 (47.8)	11.0 (51.8)	14.3 (57.7)	17.3 (63.1)	19.2 (66.6)	19.3 (66.7)	16.6 (61.9)	13.2 (55.8)	9.2 (48.6)	6.6 (43.9)	12.4 (54.3)
Mean daily minimum °C (°F)	3.3 (37.9)	2.9 (37.2)	4.5 (40.1)	6.0 (42.8)	9.3 (48.7)	12.1 (53.8)	13.7 (56.7)	13.8 (56.8)	11.4 (52.5)	9.3 (48.7)	5.9 (42.6)	3.6 (38.5)	8.0 (46.4)
Record low °C (°F)	−14.7 (5.5)	−11.2 (11.8)	−7.3 (18.9)	−3.2 (26.2)	−1.2 (29.8)	2.2 (36.0)	5.5 (41.9)	4.0 (39.2)	1.9 (35.4)	−4.6 (23.7)	−7.5 (18.5)	−12.6 (9.3)	−14.7 (5.5)
Average precipitation mm (inches)	66.6 (2.62)	51.6 (2.03)	48.9 (1.93)	51.2 (2.02)	58.1 (2.29)	50.9 (2.00)	44.0 (1.73)	43.5 (1.71)	56.6 (2.23)	73.1 (2.88)	73.2 (2.88)	73.3 (2.89)	691.0 (27.20)
Average precipitation days (≥ 1.0 mm)	11.5	10.1	8.9	9.9	8.9	7.4	7.1	7.1	7.8	11.0	12.5	12.3	114.6
Average snowy days	1.9	2.9	1.0	0.4	0.0	0.0	0.0	0.0	0.0	0.0	0.2	1.3	7.7
Average relative humidity (%)	87	83	79	76	77	75	75	76	80	85	87	87	81
Mean monthly sunshine hours	68.3	92.7	134.1	173.8	202.1	213.3	220.2	207.2	180.7	116.7	83.5	69.0	1,761.5
Source 1: Meteo France (snow days 1981–2010)
Source 2: Infoclimat.fr (relative humidity 1961–1990)

== Demographics ==
In 2023, the inner population of the city was 230,890. The Rennes intercommunal structure connecting Rennes with 42 nearby suburbs (named Rennes Métropole) had 450,593 inhabitants and the metropolitan area had a population of nearly 750,000.

Rennes has the second fastest-growing metropolitan area in France after Toulouse and ahead of Montpellier, Bordeaux and Nantes.

Historical population

Year	Pop.	±% p.a.
1770	23,143	—
1790	25,160	+0.42%
1793	30,160	+6.23%
1800	25,904	−2.15%
1806	29,225	+2.03%
1821	29,589	+0.08%
1831	27,340	−0.79%
1836	35,552	+5.39%
1841	37,895	+1.28%
1846	39,218	+0.69%
1851	39,505	+0.15%
1856	45,664	+2.94%
1861	45,483	−0.08%

Year	Pop.	±% p.a.
1866	48,283	+1.20%
1872	52,044	+1.26%
1876	57,177	+2.38%
1881	60,974	+1.29%
1886	66,139	+1.64%
1891	69,232	+0.92%
1896	69,937	+0.20%
1901	74,676	+1.32%
1906	75,640	+0.26%
1911	79,372	+0.97%
1921	82,241	+0.36%
1926	83,418	+0.28%
1931	88,659	+1.23%

Year	Pop.	±% p.a.
1936	98,538	+2.14%
1946	113,781	+1.45%
1954	124,122	+1.09%
1962	151,948	+2.56%
1968	180,943	+2.95%
1975	198,305	+1.32%
1982	194,656	−0.26%
1990	197,536	+0.18%
1999	206,229	+0.48%
2007	207,922	+0.10%
2012	209,860	+0.19%
2017	216,815	+0.65%
2023	230,890	+1.05%

Source: EHESS and INSEE

== Sights ==
=== Historic centre ===
The historic centre is located on the former plan of the ramparts. There is a difference between the northern city centre and the southern city centre due to the 1720 fire, which destroyed most of the timber-framed houses in the northern part of the city. The rebuilding was done in stone, on a grid plan. The poorer southern part was not rebuilt.

Due to the presence of the parlement de Bretagne, many "hôtels particuliers" were built in the northern part, the richer half of Rennes in the 18th century. Most of the city's monuments historiques can be found there.

Colourful traditional half-timbered houses are situated primarily along the roads of Saint-Sauveur, Saint-Georges, de Saint-Malo, Saint-Guillaume, des Dames, du Chapitre, Vasselot, Saint-Michel, de la Psallette and around the plazas of Champ-Jacquet, des Lices, Saint-Anne and Rallier-du-Baty.

==== The Parlement de Bretagne and city hall area ====
The Parlement de Bretagne (Administrative and judicial centre of Brittany, Breton: Breujoù Breizh) is the most famous 17th-century building in Rennes. It was rebuilt after a terrible fire in 1994 that may have been caused by a flare fired by a protester during a demonstration. It houses the Rennes Court of Appeal. The surrounding plaza is built in the classical style.

In the west, the Place de la Mairie (City Hall Plaza, Plasenn Ti Kêr):

- City Hall
- Opera

In the east, at the end of the Rue Saint-Georges with traditional half-timbered houses:

- 1920s Saint George Municipal Pool, with mosaics
- Saint George Palace, and its garden

In the south-east:

- Saint-Germain square
  - Saint-Germain Church
  - Saint-Germain footbridge, 20th-century wood-and-metal construction that links the plaza with Émile Zola Quay, across the Vilaine River.
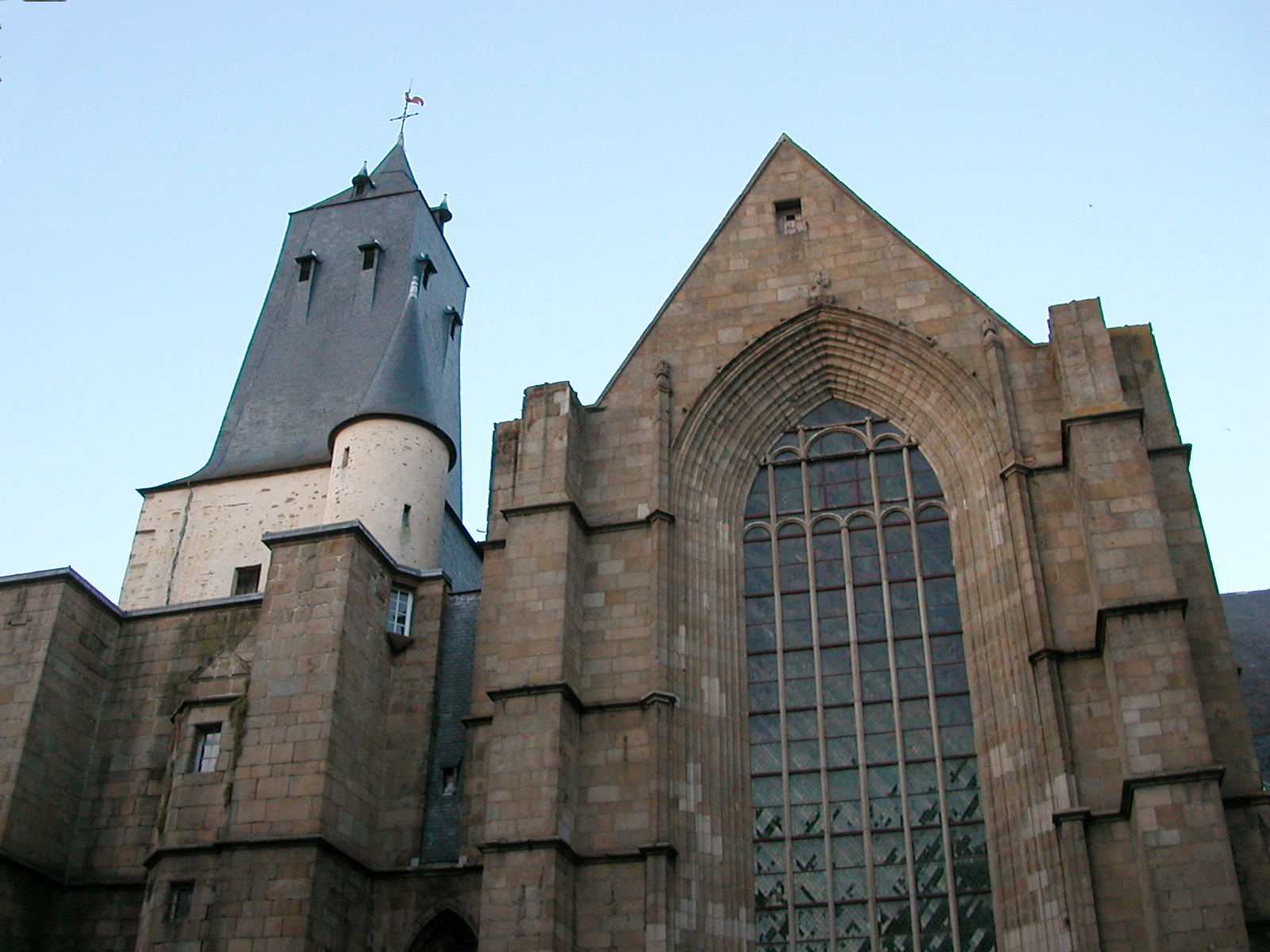
Saint Germain's church

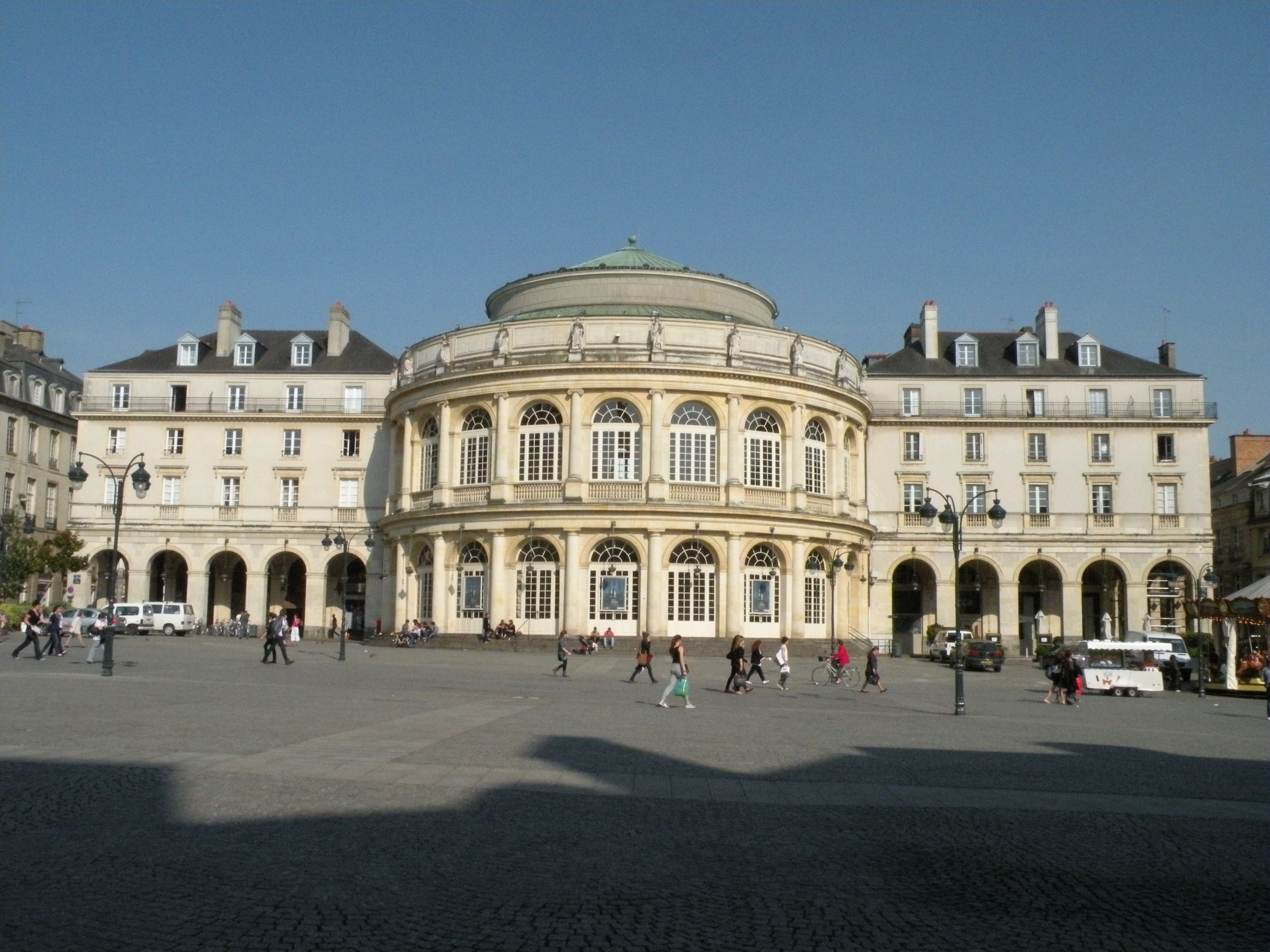
Opera of Rennes

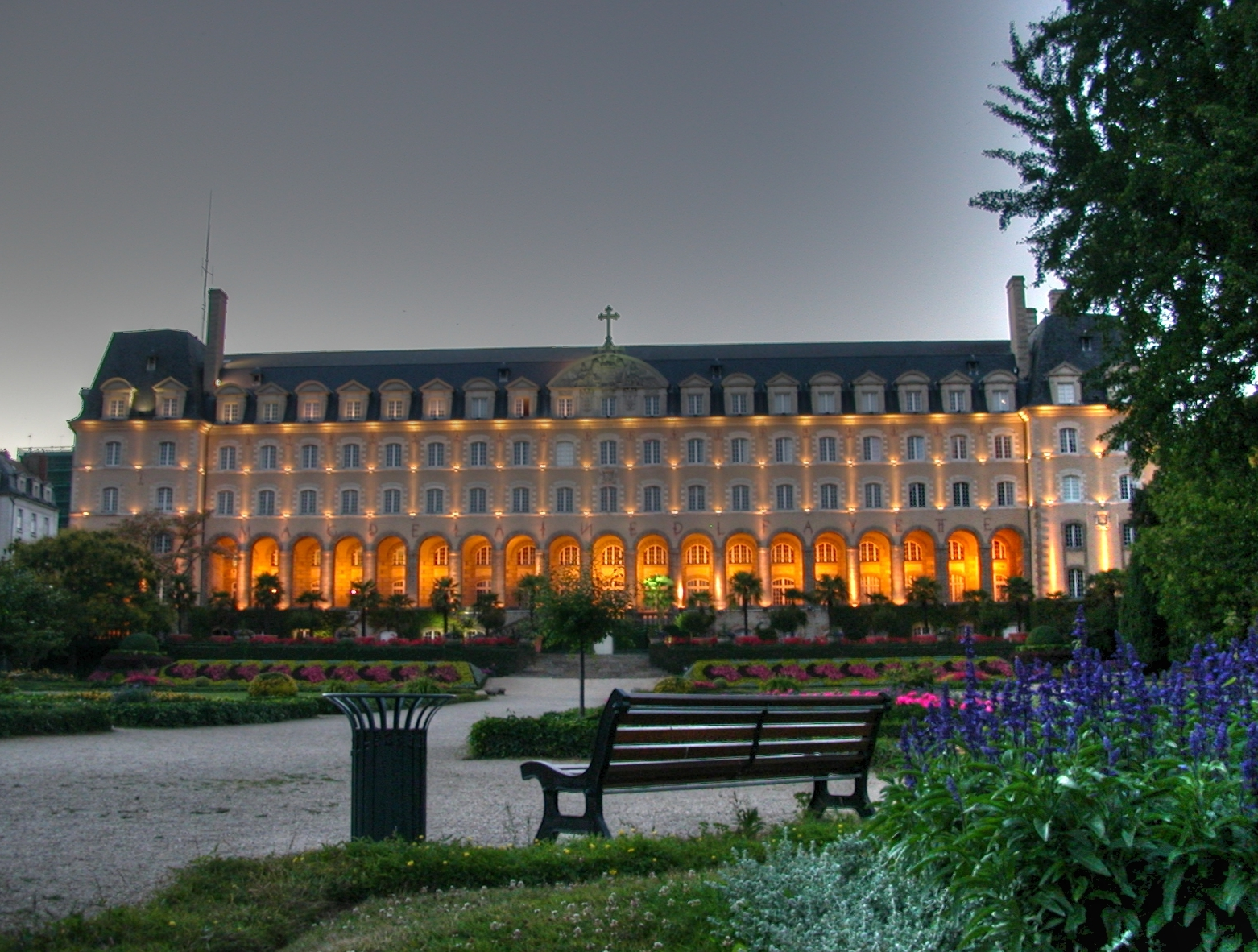
Saint Georges Palace

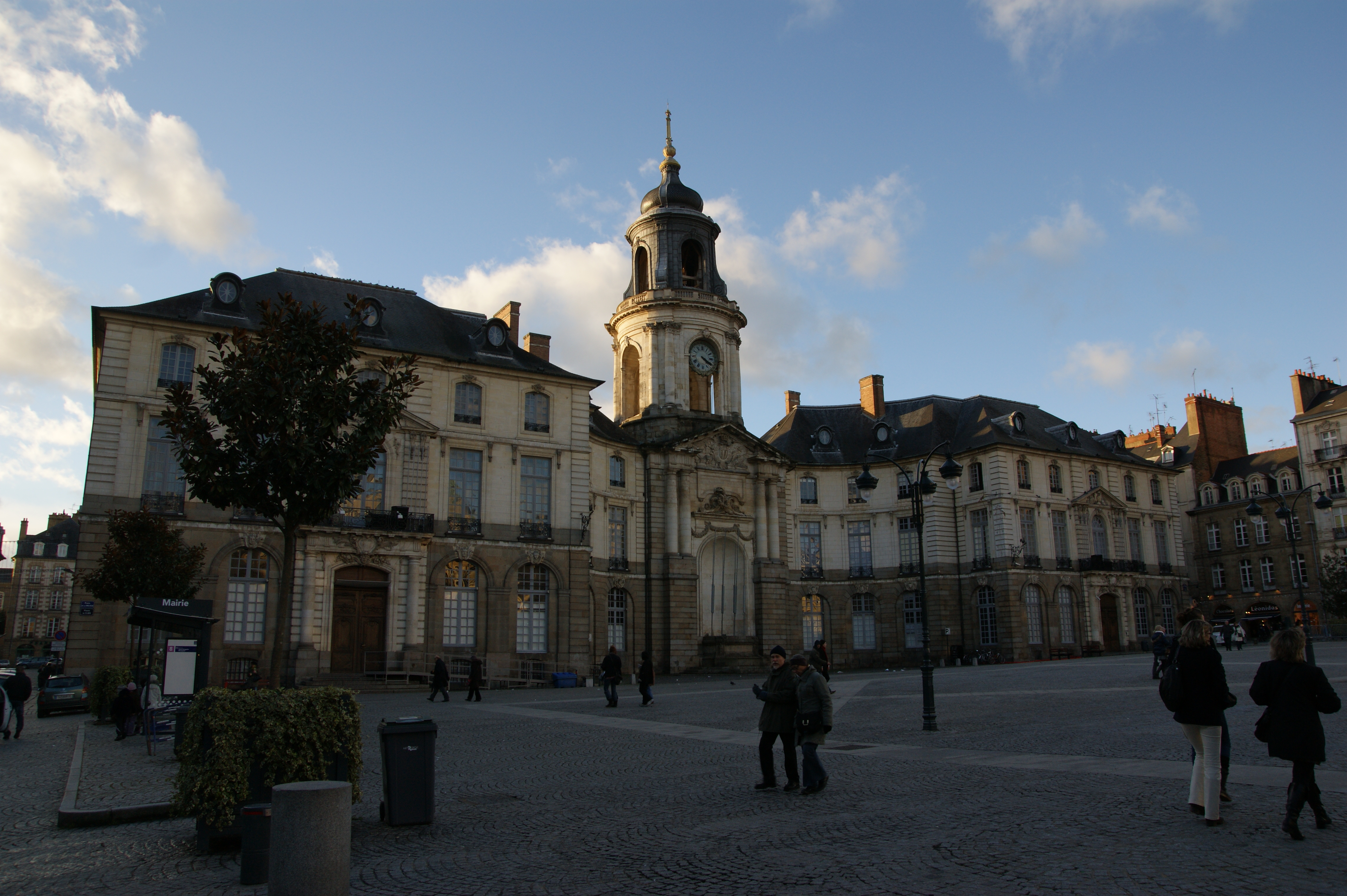
City Hall

==== The Place des Lices and cathedral area ====
The Place des Lices is lined by hôtels particuliers. Along with the Place Rallier-du-Baty, it is the location of the weekly big market, the marché des Lices.

Near the Rennes Cathedral (cathédrale Saint-Pierre de Rennes) is the Rue du Chapitre:

- Hôtel de Blossac
- There are 16th century polychrome wooden busts on the façade of 20, Rue du Chapitre.

Also in this area are the former St. Yves chapel, which is now the tourist office and a local historical museum, and the Basilica Saint-Sauveur.

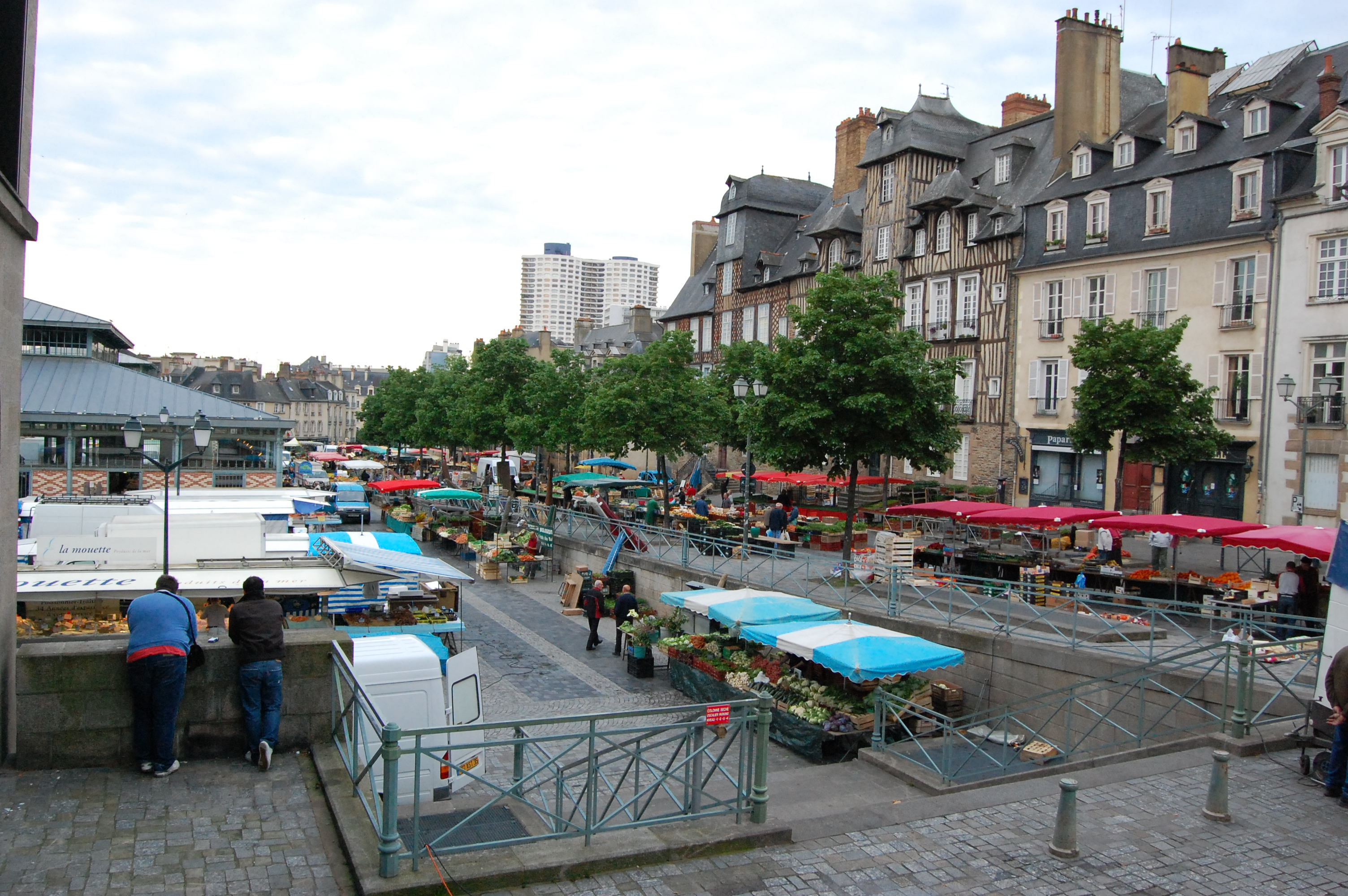
Place des Lices with the roof top of Les Halles Martenot seen in on the left, and the hôtels particuliers on the right

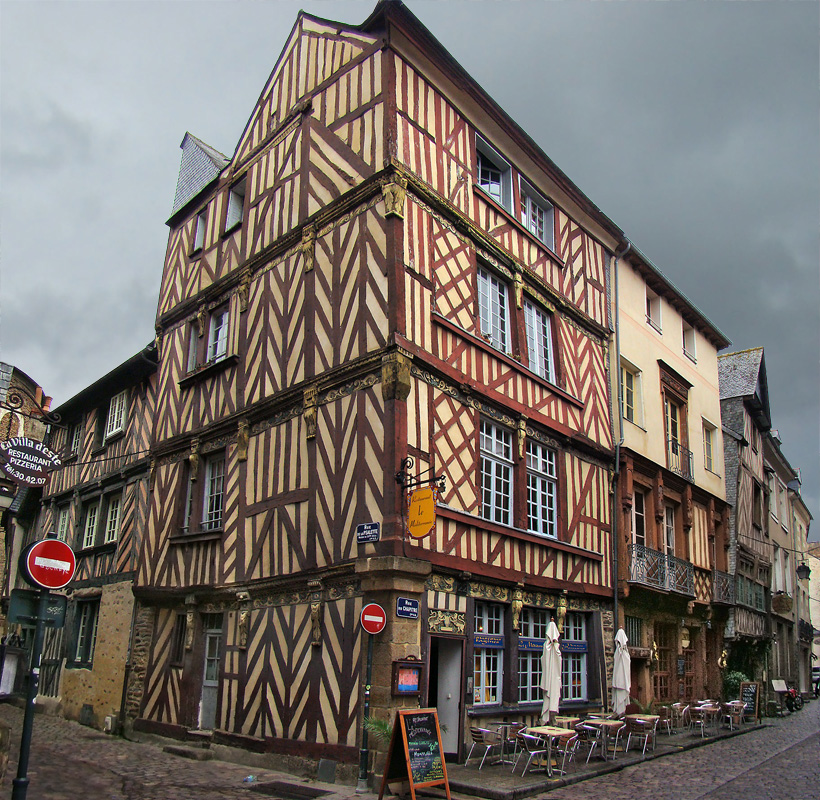
Rue du Chapitre

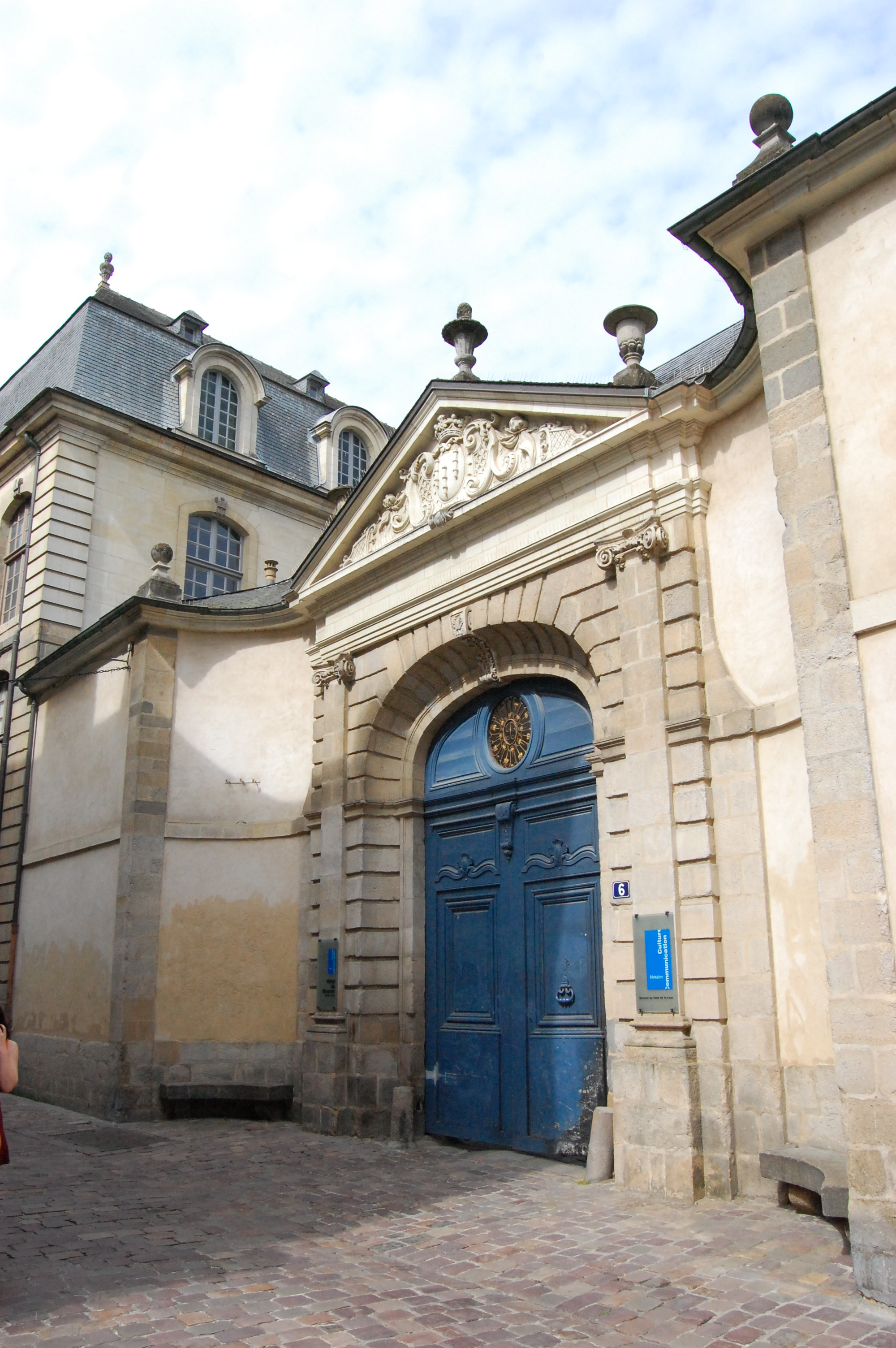
Gate of the Hôtel de Blossac

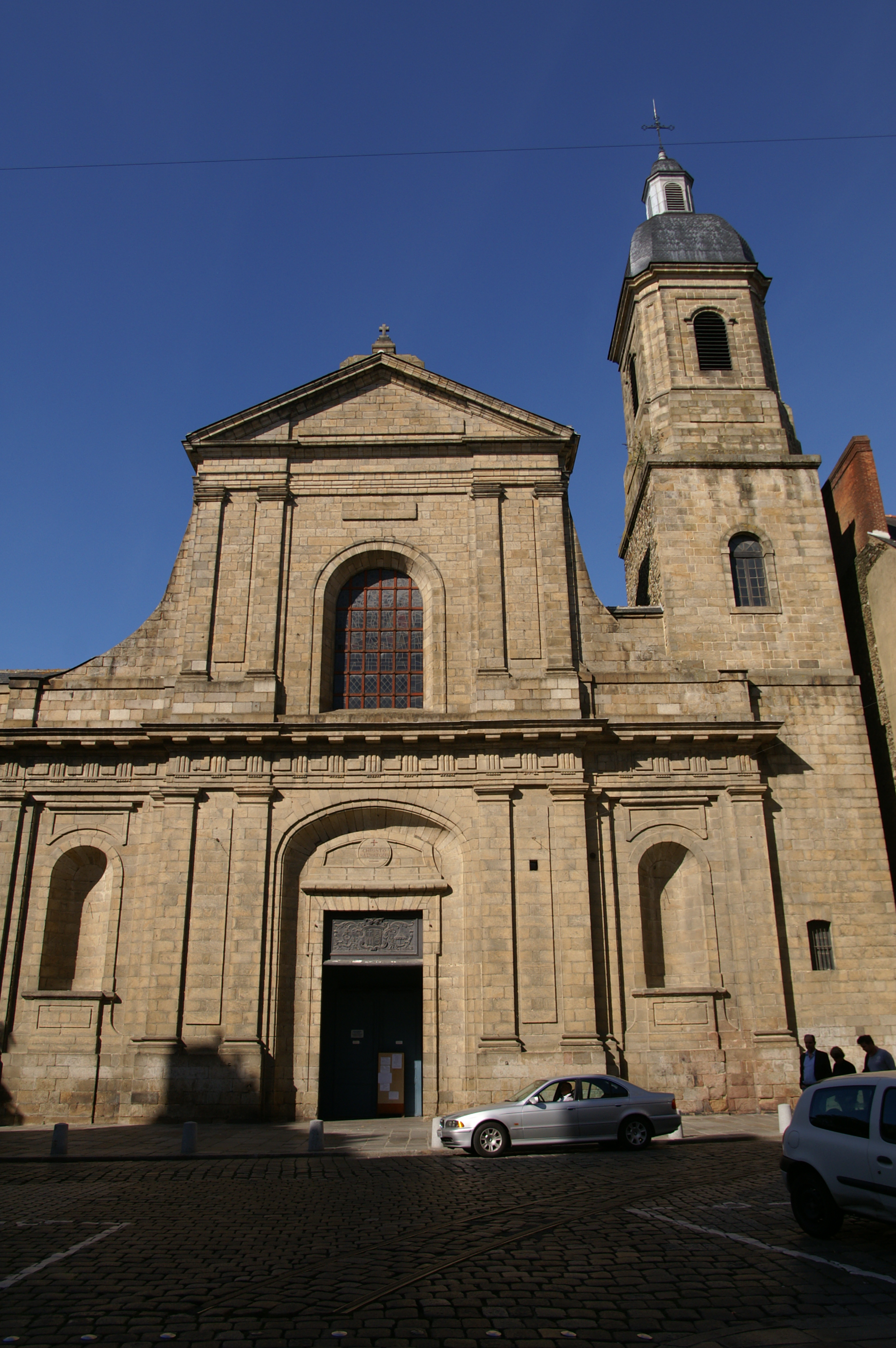
Basilique Saint-Sauveur

==== Remains of the ramparts ====
Built from the 3rd to the 12th centuries, the ramparts were largely destroyed between the beginning of the 16th century and the 1860s.

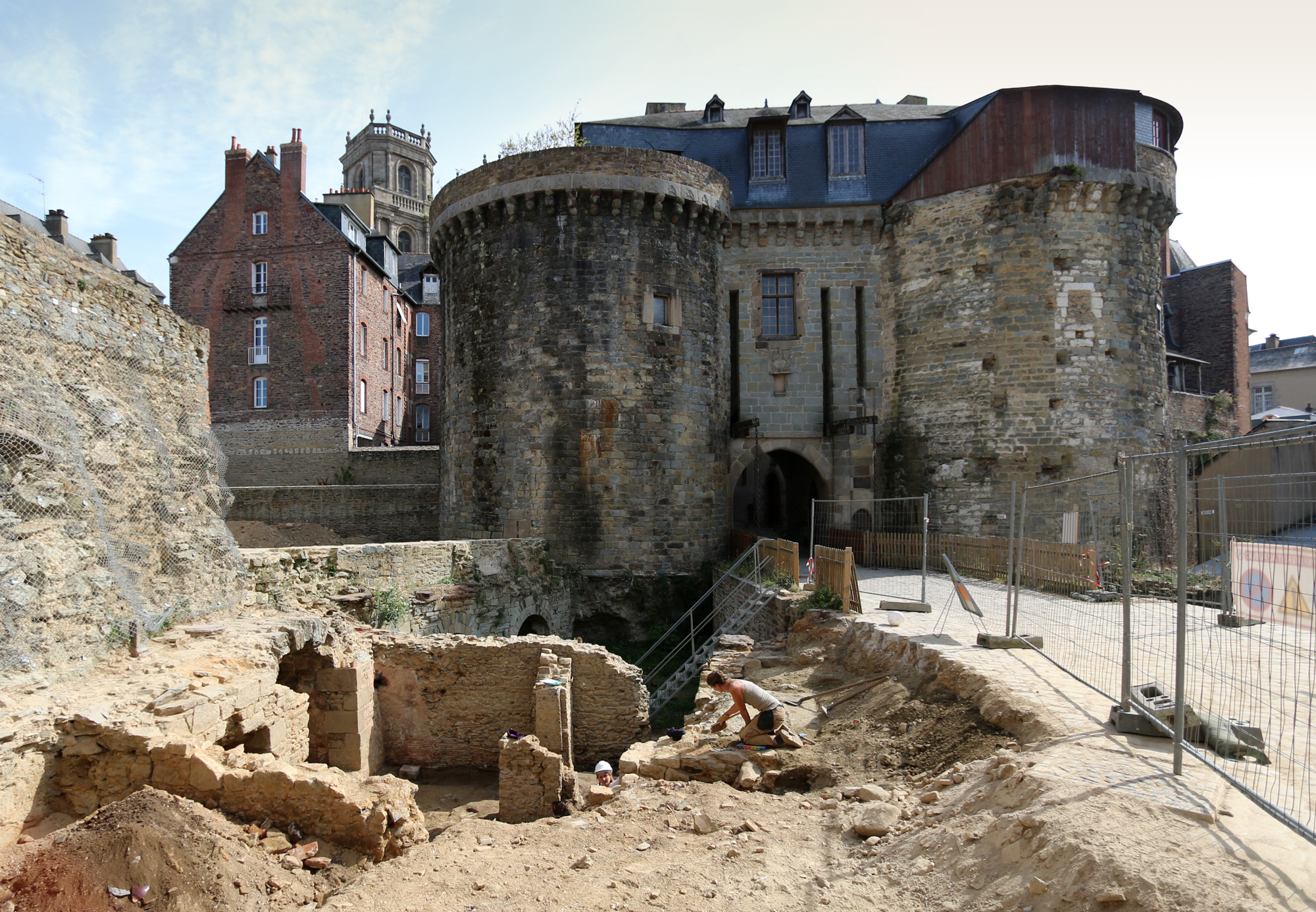
Portes mordelaises. The street crossing this gate comes from the Place des Lices and ends at the cathedral.

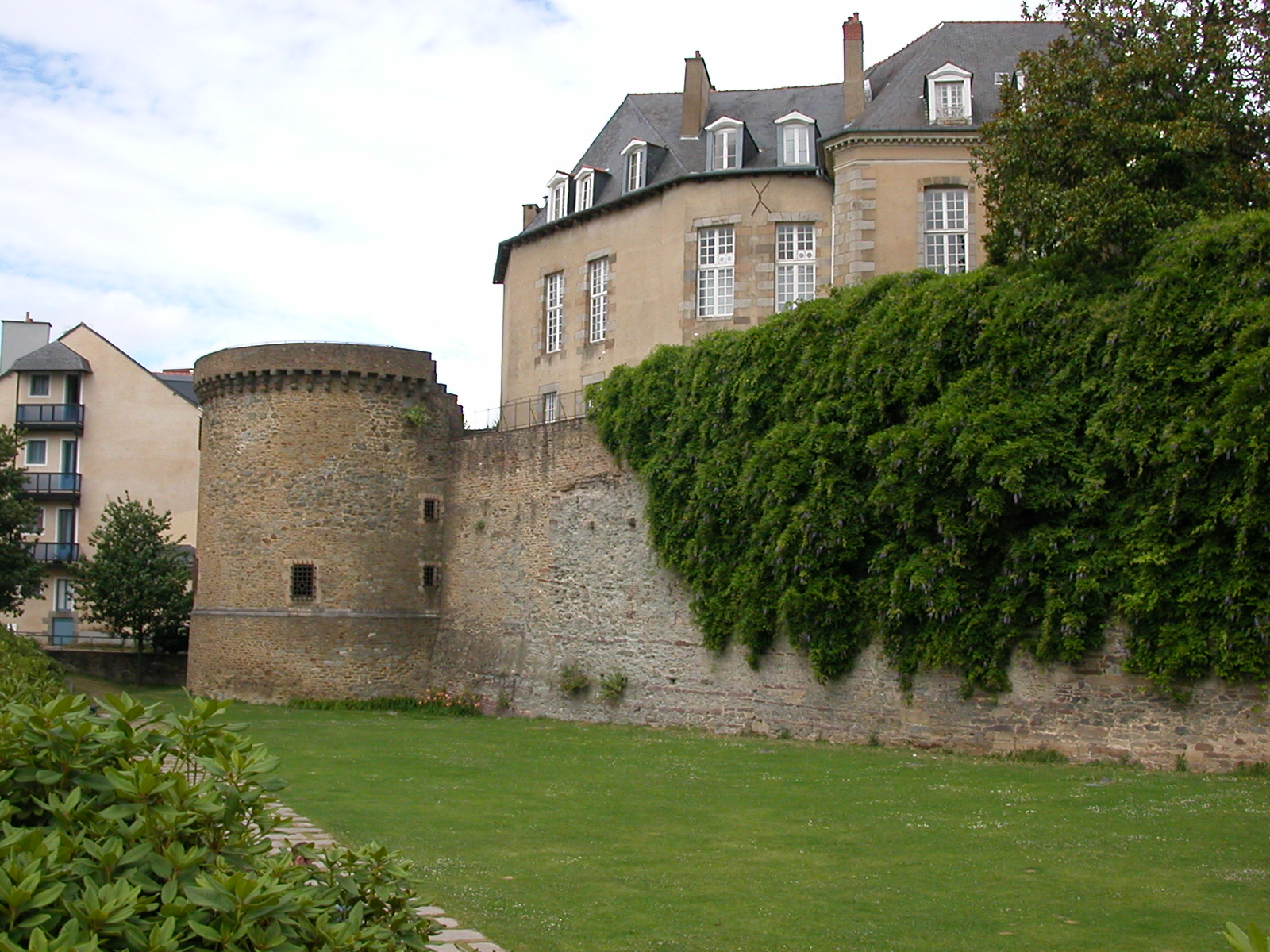
Tour Duchesne

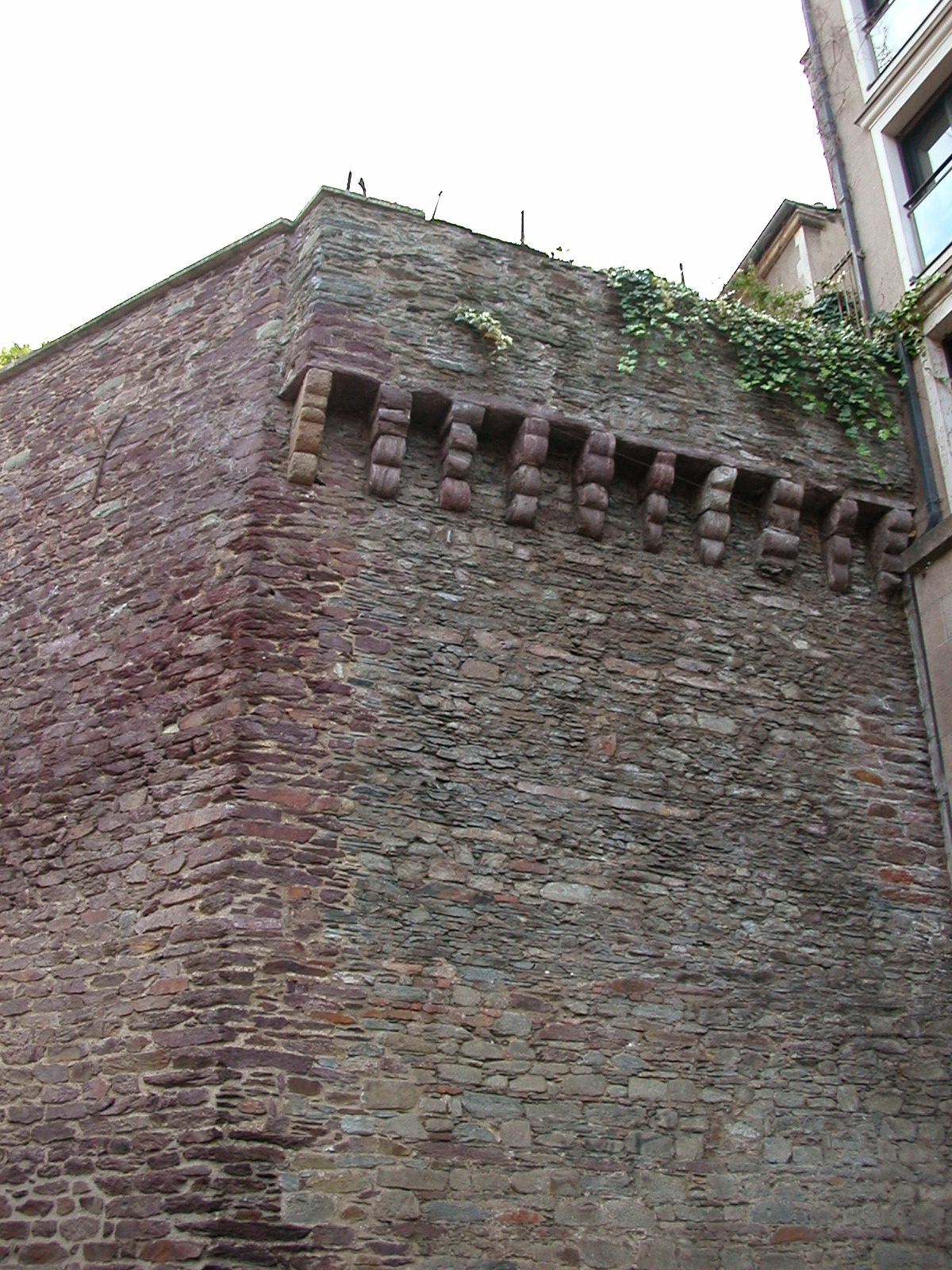
Place Railler-du-Baty

Map of the remaining ramparts in Rennes

==== Place Saint-Anne area ====
- Place Saint-Anne (Plasenn Santez-Anna)
- Saint-Aubin Church, built in the beginning of the 20th century
- Location of a former 14th century hospital
- Jacobite convent, the convention centre

In the south-west of the area, La Rue Saint-Michel nicknamed Rue de La Soif (Road of Thirst), is known for its many bars. Meanwhile, in the south-east, the Place du Champ-Jacquet features Renaissance buildings and a statue of mayor Jean Leperdit ripping up a conscription list.

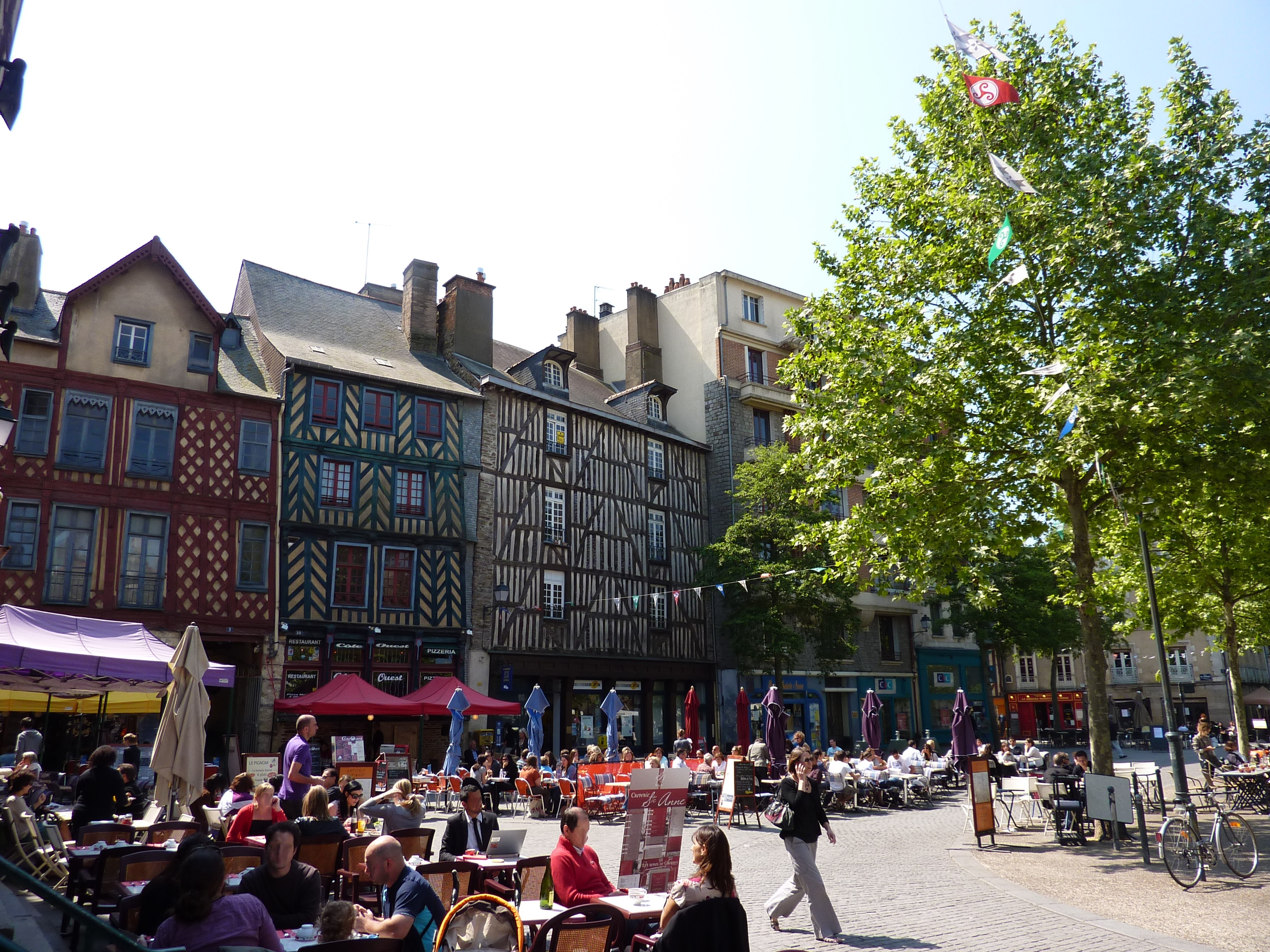
Place Saint-Anne

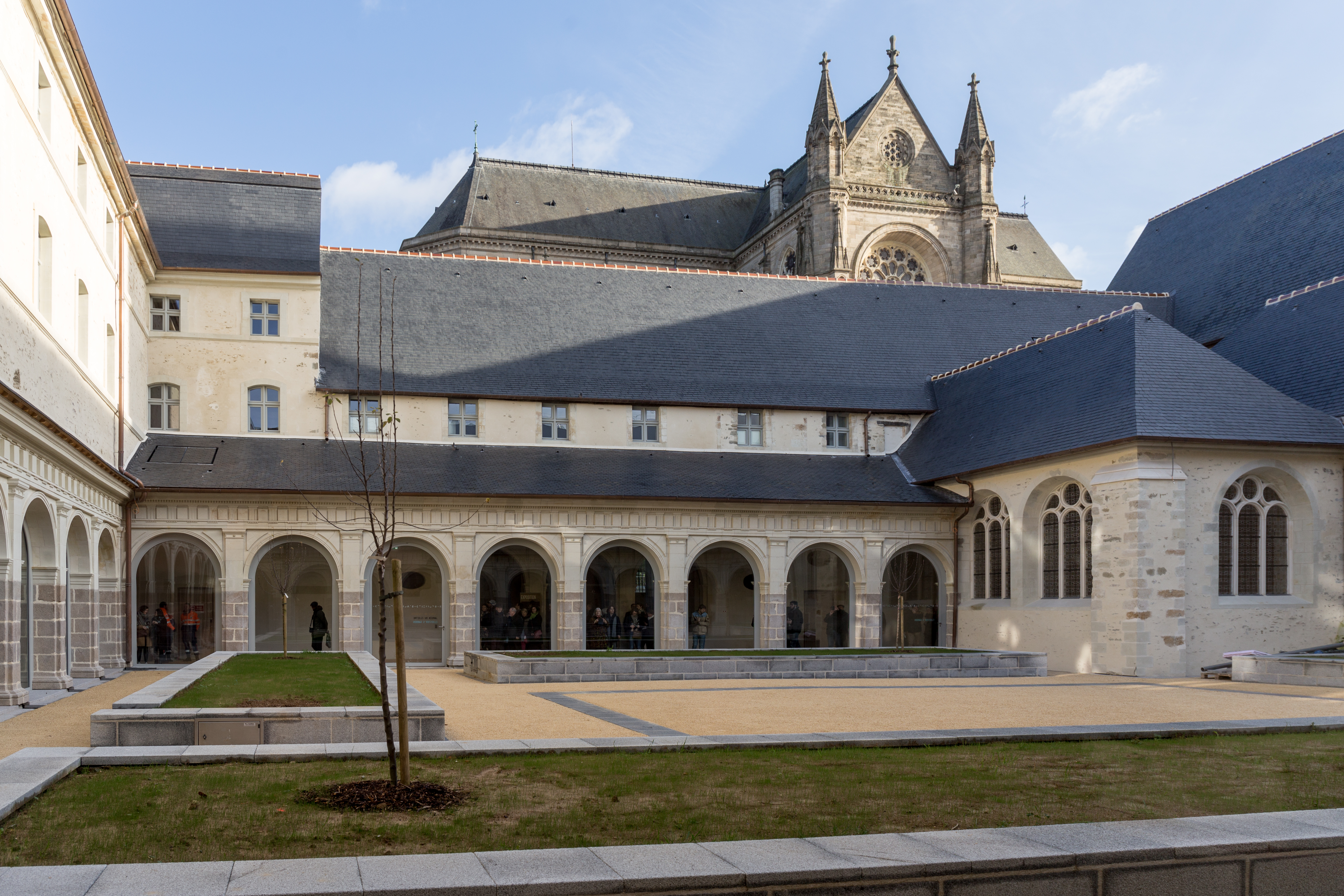
Convention centre

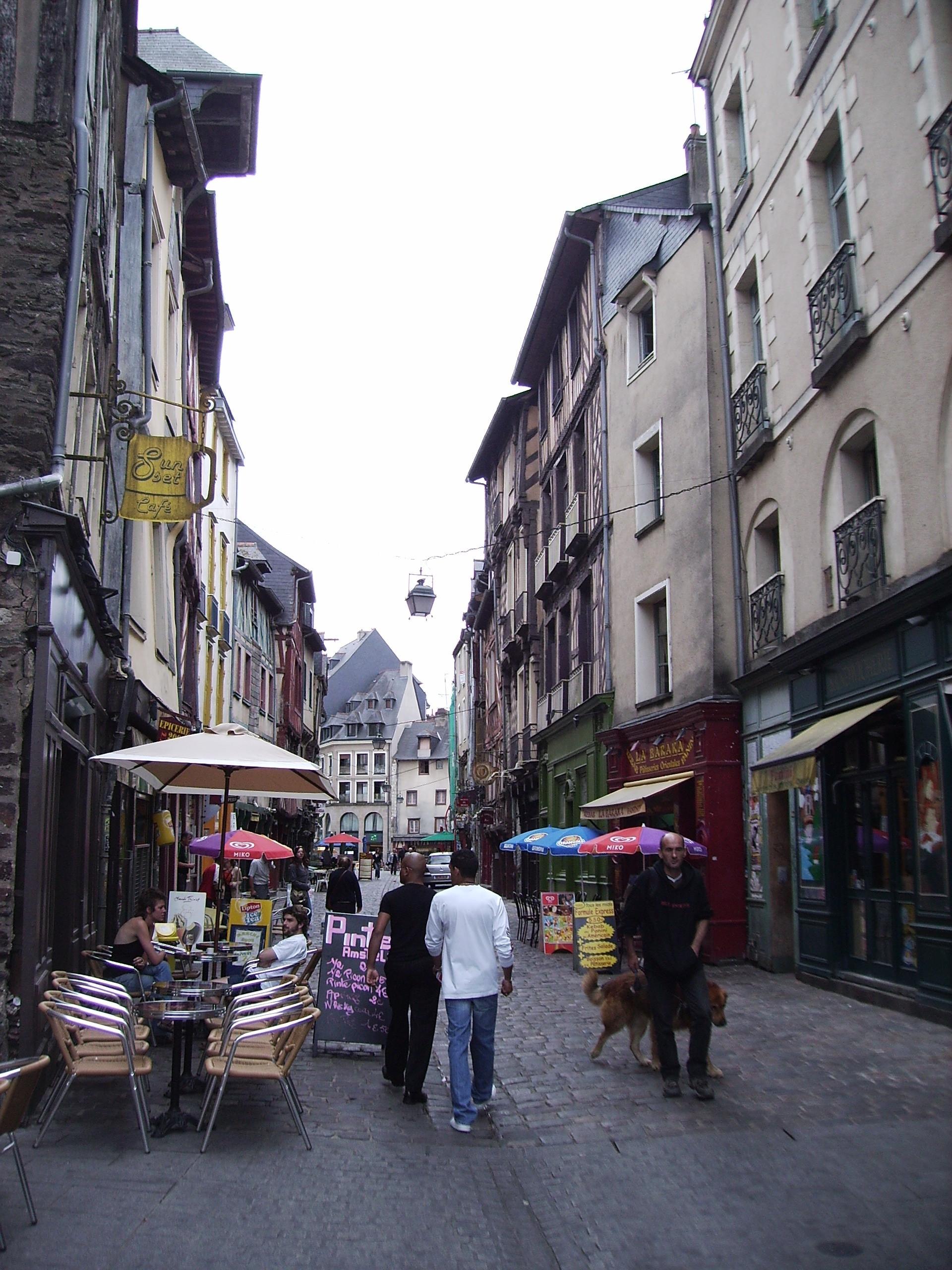
Saint-Michel street

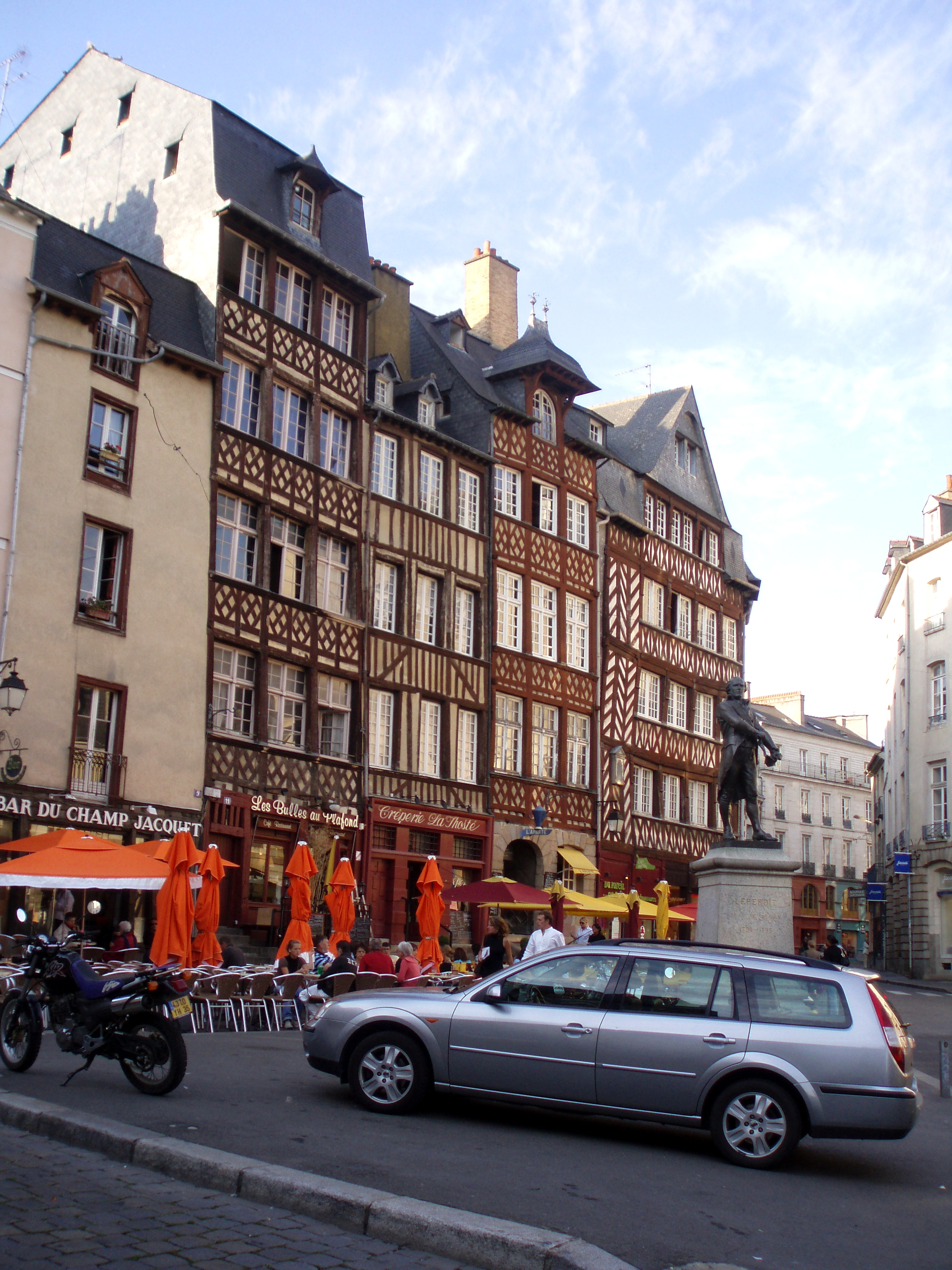
Medieval houses at Champ-Jacquet

==== East: Thabor park area ====
Area of Saint-Melaine square

Notre-Dame-en-Saint-Melaine basilica,

- Tower and transept from the 11th century Benedictine abbey of Saint-Melaine
- 14th century Gothic arcades
- 17th century colonnade
- Bell tower topped with a gilded Virgin Mary (19th century)
- 17th century cloister

Jardin botanique du Thabor (formal French garden, orangerie, rose garden, aviary) a botanical garden on 10 hectares of land, built between 1860 and 1867.

17th century promenade "la Motte à Madame", and a monumental stairway overlooking the Rue de Paris entrance to the Thabor.

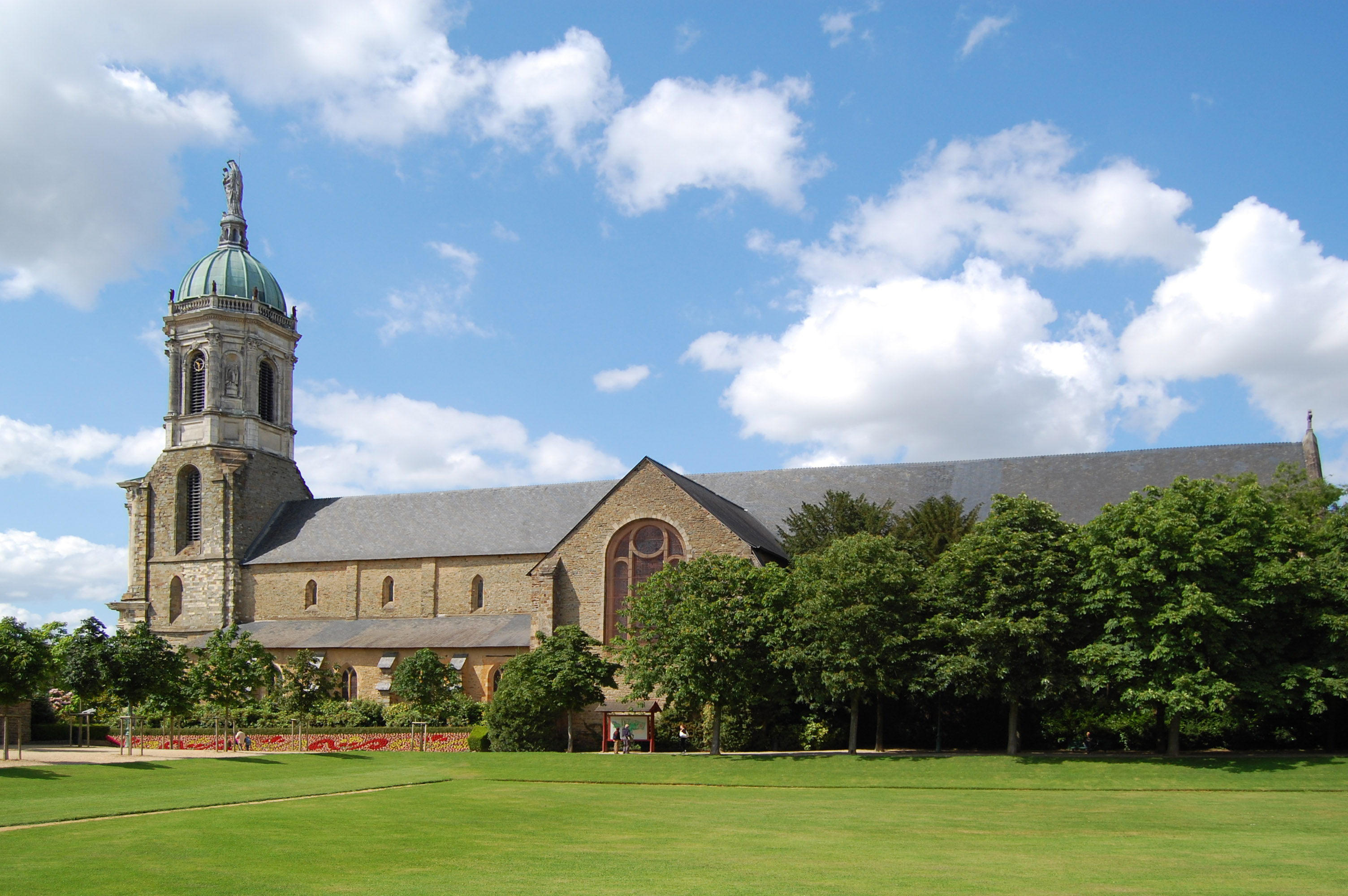
Notre-Dame-en-Saint-Melaine basilica, viewed from the parc du Thabor

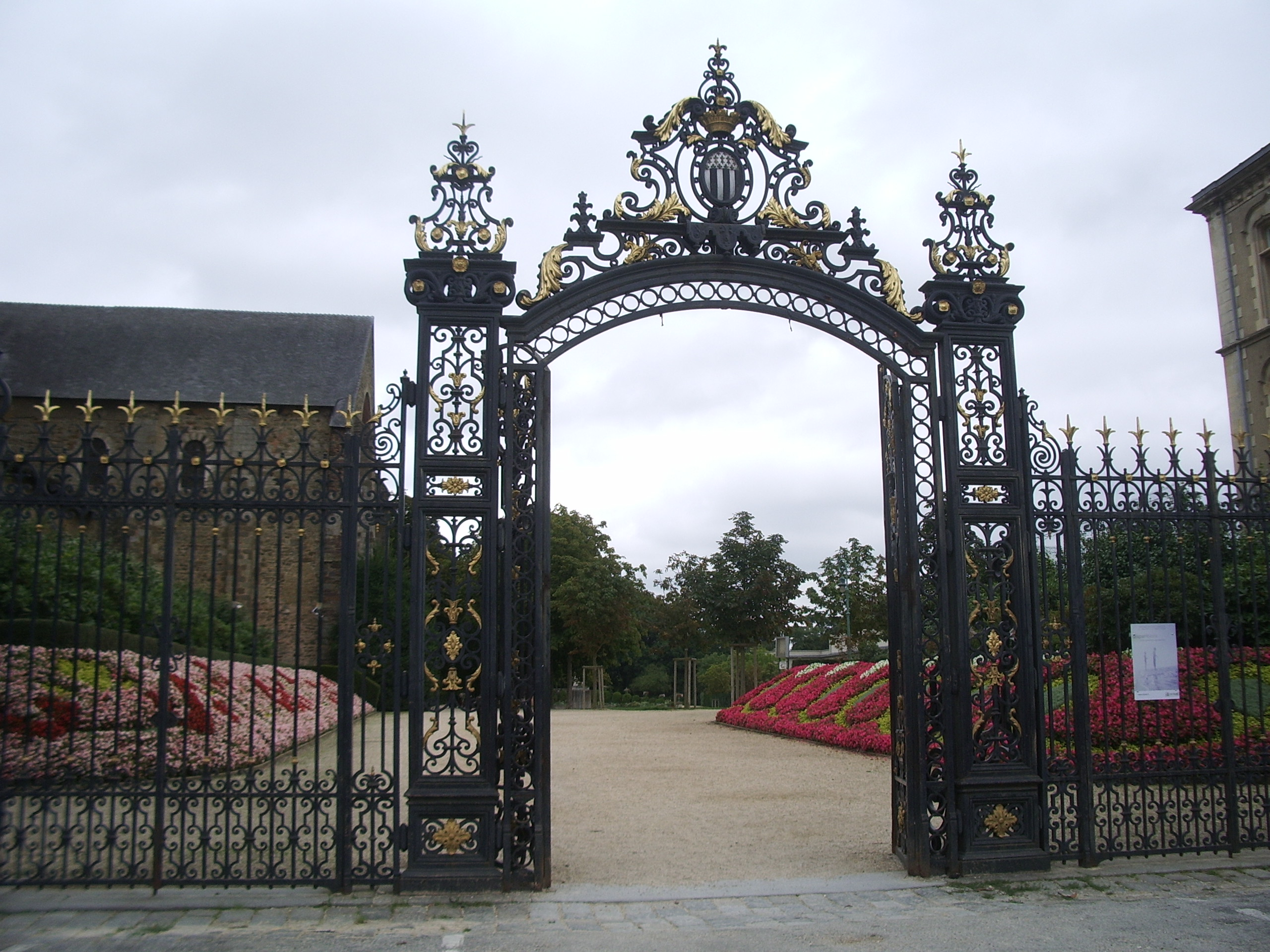
Main gate of the parc du Thabor

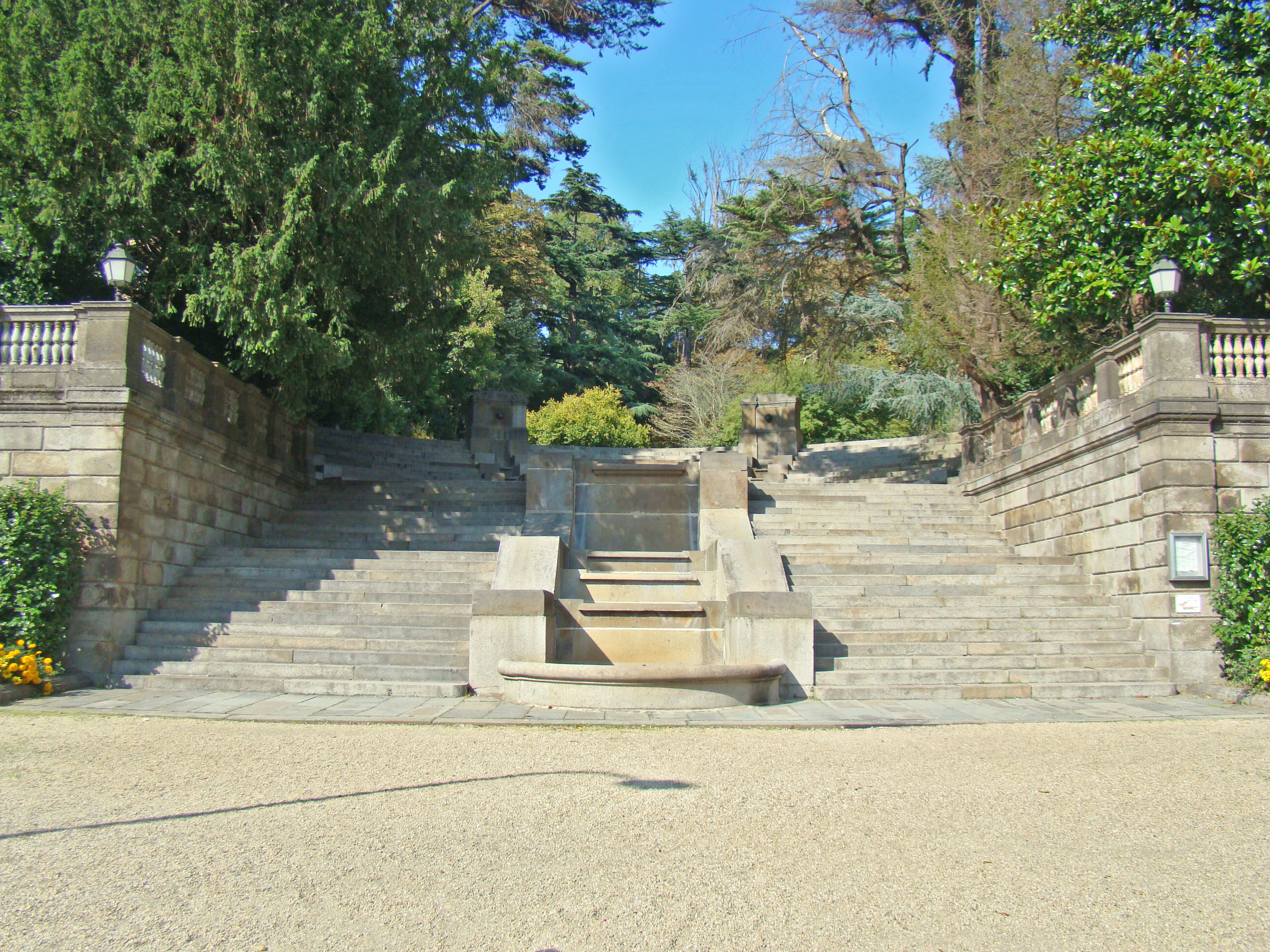
Rue de Paris Thabor entrance

==== South city centre ====
The south city centre is a mix of old buildings and 19th and 20th century constructions.

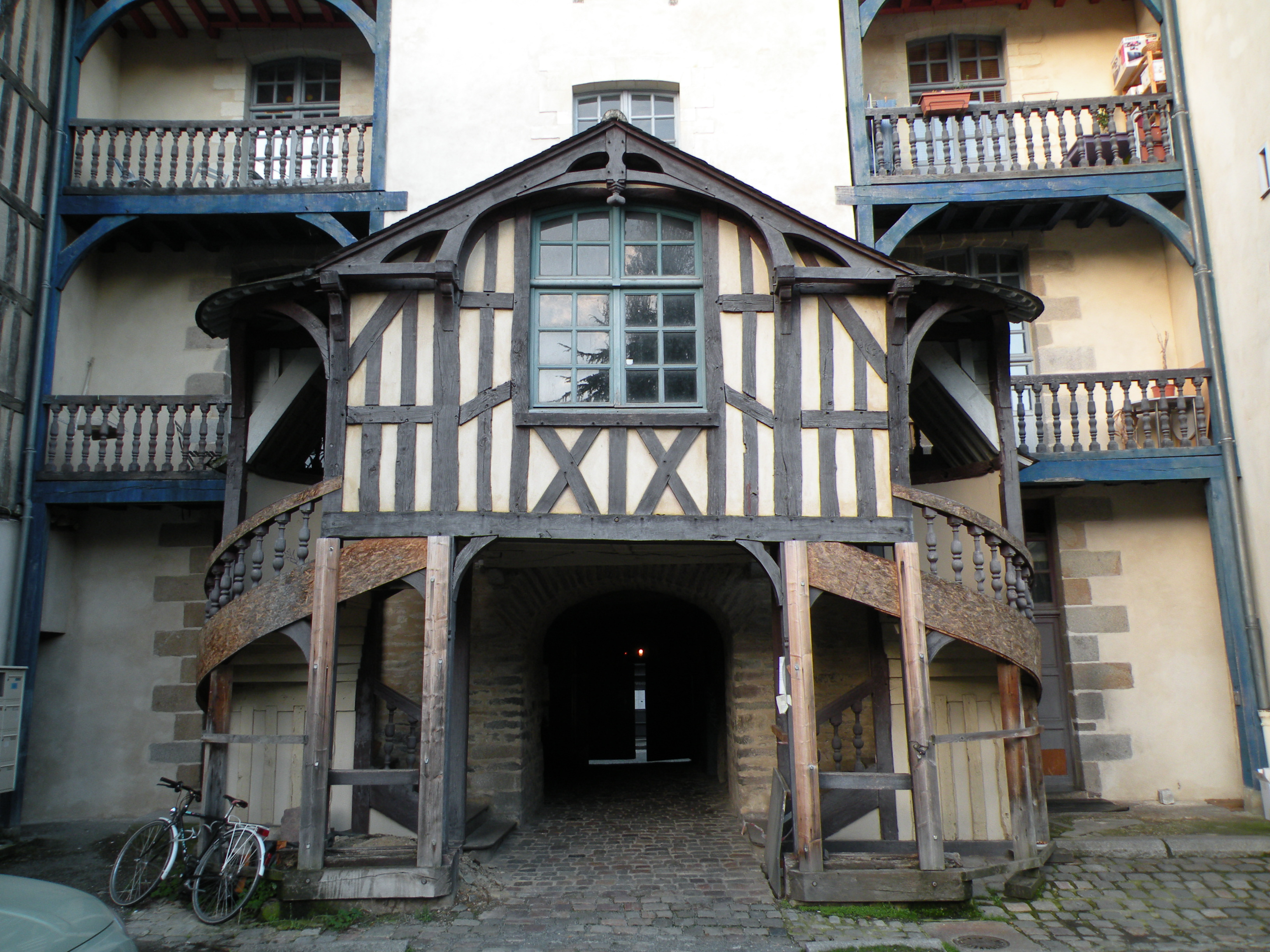
Maison des Carmes

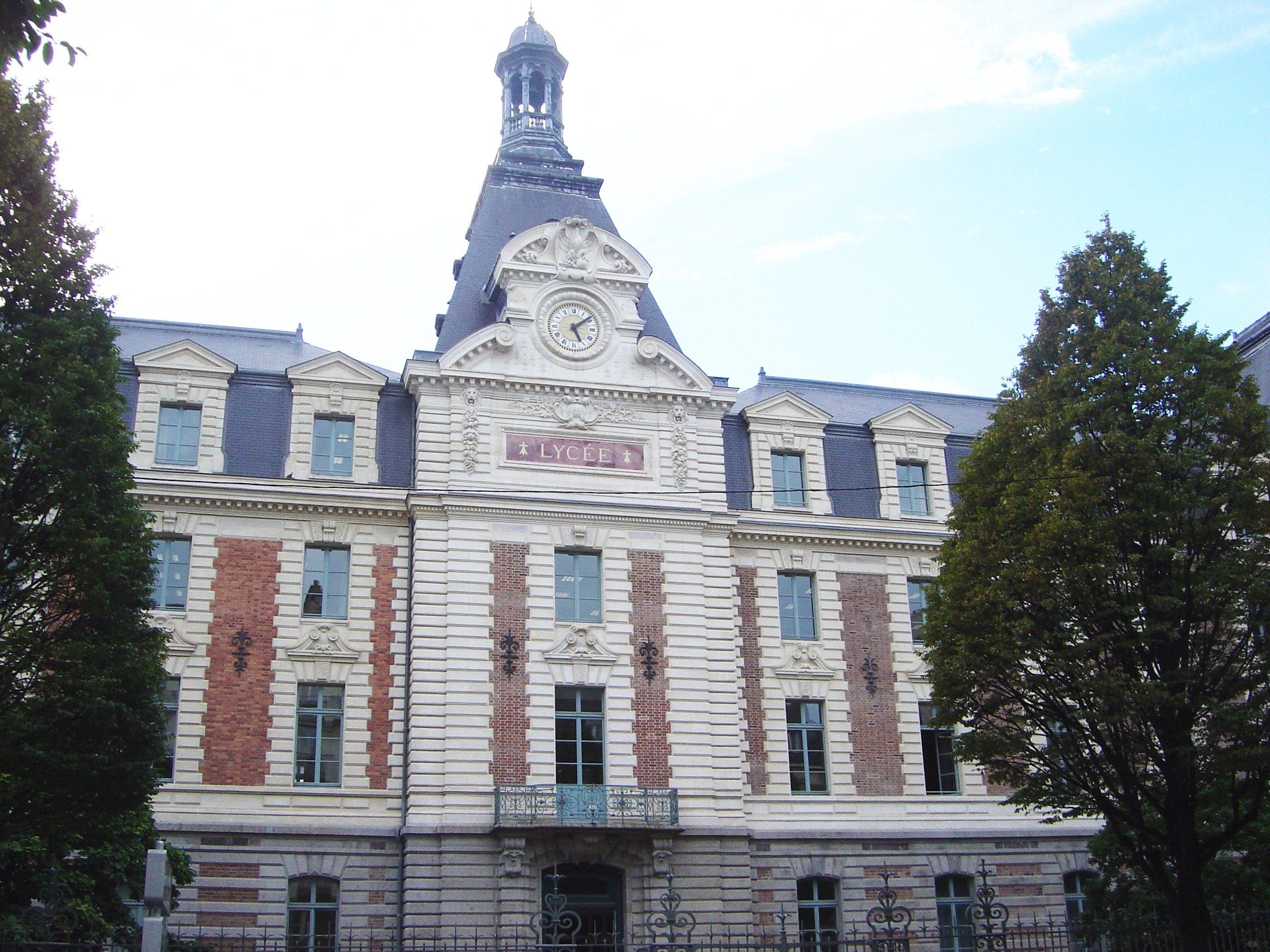
Lycée Zola

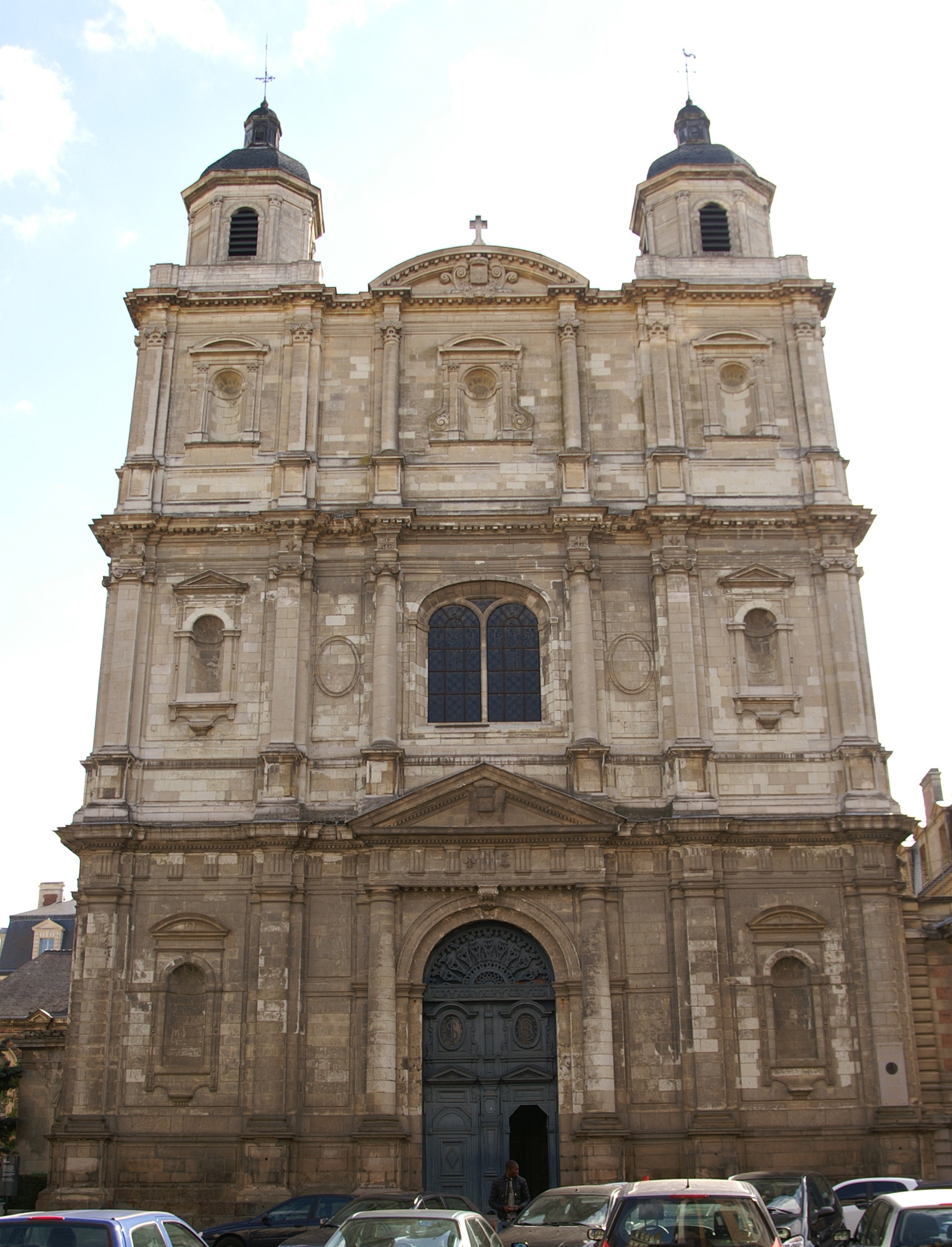
Toussaints church

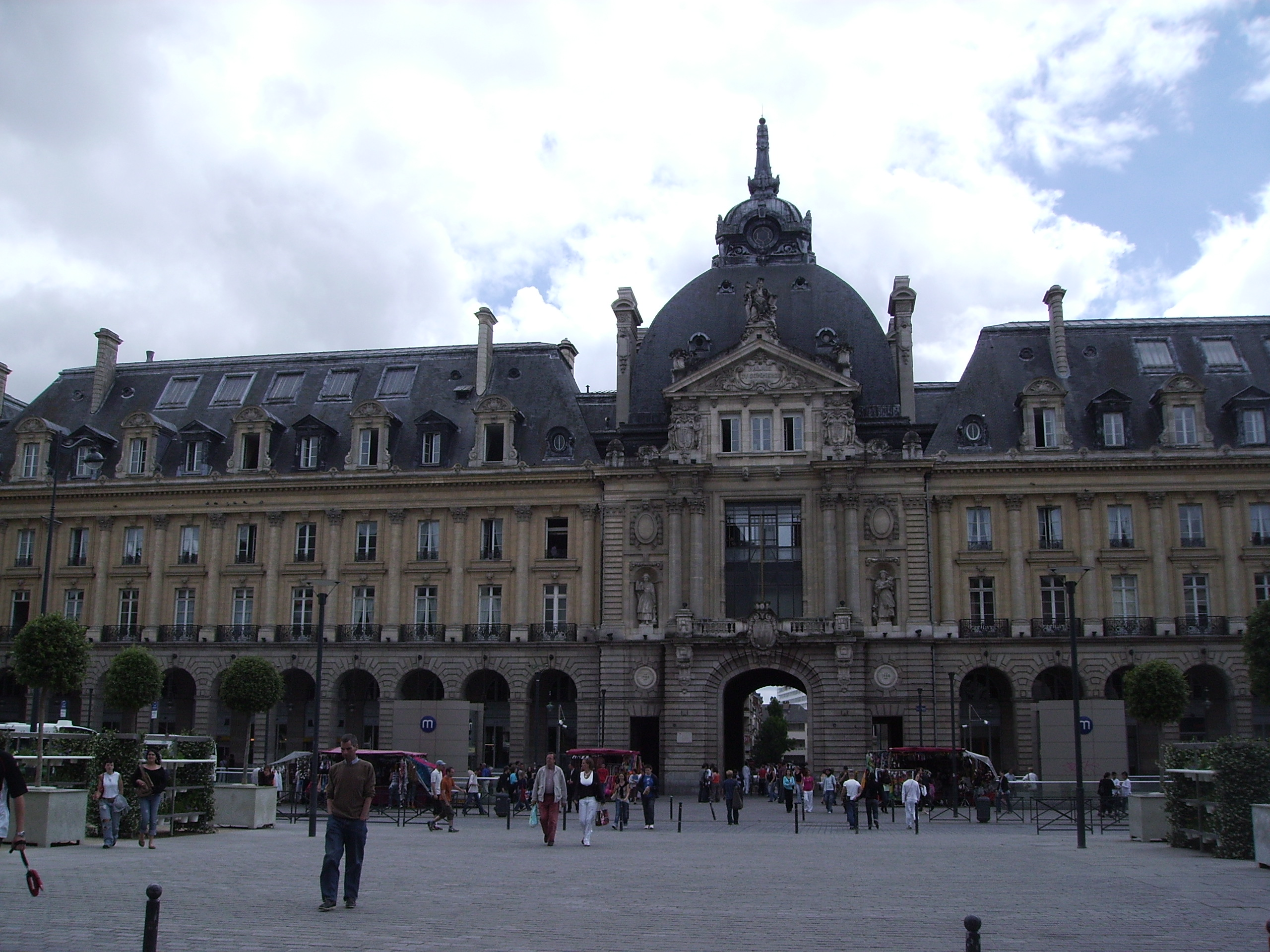
Palais du commerce

=== South of the Vilaine ===
The Fine Arts Museum is situated on Quai Émile Zola, by the Vilaine River.

Les Champs Libres is a building on Esplanade Charles de Gaulle, and was designed by the architect Christian de Portzamparc. It houses the Brittany Museum (Musée de Bretagne), the regional library Bibliothèque de Rennes Métropole with six floors, and the Espace des Sciences science centre with a planetarium.

At Place Honoré Commeurec is Les Halles Centrales, a covered market from 1922, with one part converted into contemporary art gallery.

The Mercure Hotel is located in a restored building on Rue du Pré-Botté, which is the former office of Ouest-Éclair, and then of Ouest-France, France's leading daily regional newspaper.

There are large mills at Rue Duhamel, constructed on each side of the south branch of the Vilaine in 1895 and 1902.

=== Other sights ===
To the northwest of Rennes, near Rue de Saint-Malo, are the locks of the Canal d'Ille-et-Rance, opened in 1843.

Two locations for Oberthür Printing Works were built by Marthenot between 1870 and 1895 on Rue de Paris in the eastern part of the city. Oberthür Park is the second biggest garden in the city.

The 17th century manor of Haute-Chalais, a granite château, is situated to the south of the city in Blosne Quarter (Bréquigny).

=== Parks and gardens ===
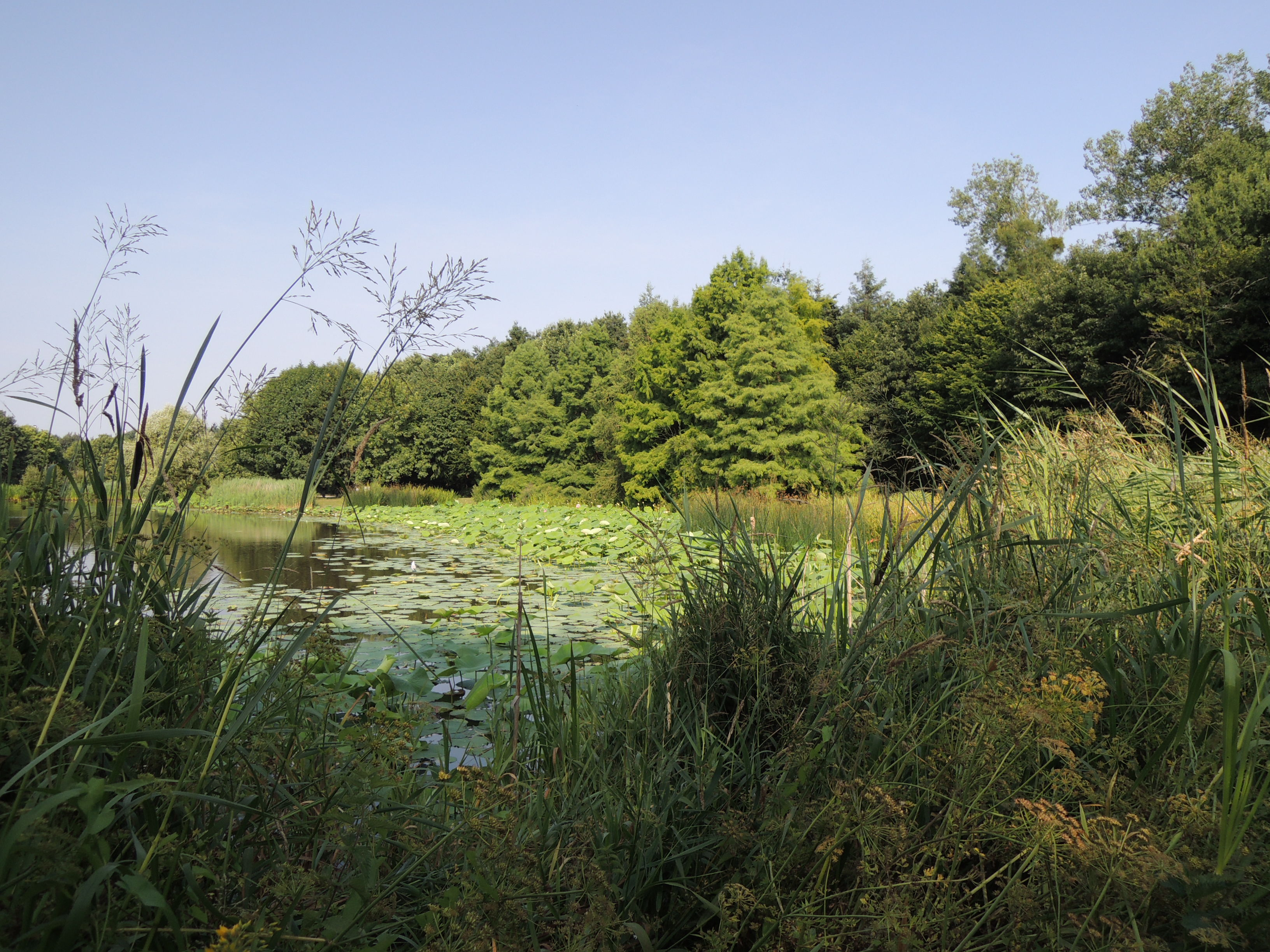
Gayeulles parc

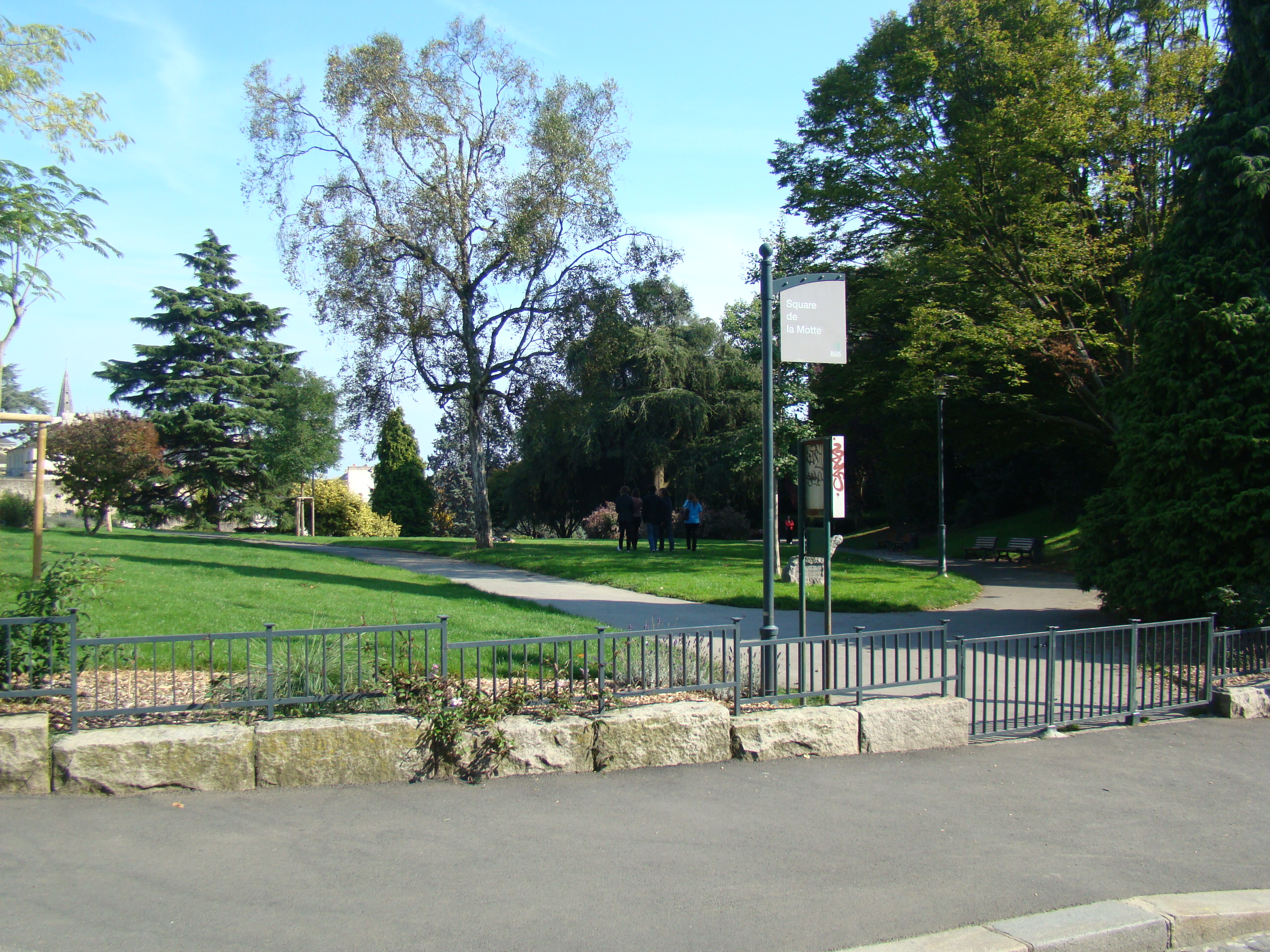
Square of Motte

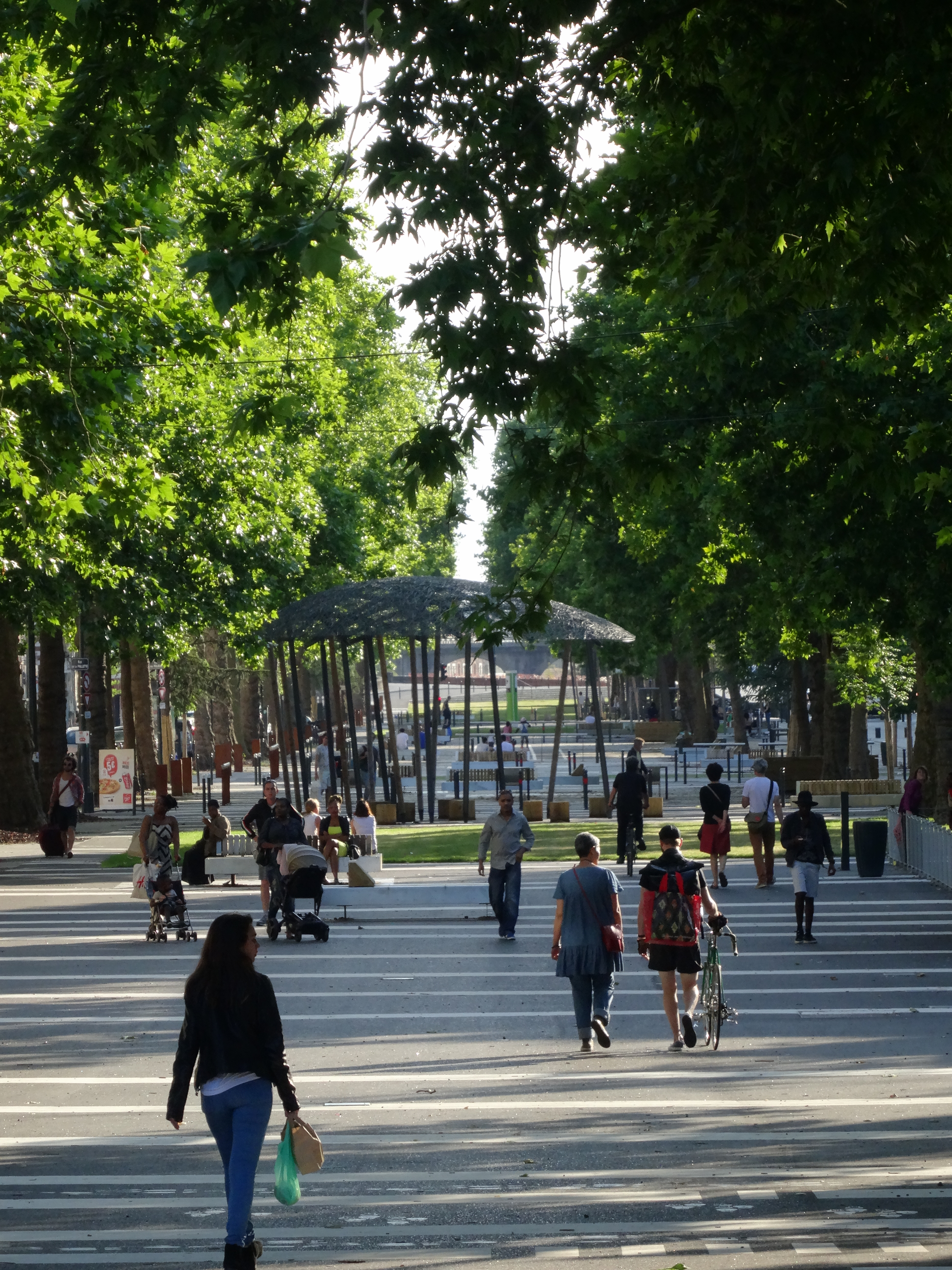
Mail Mitterrand

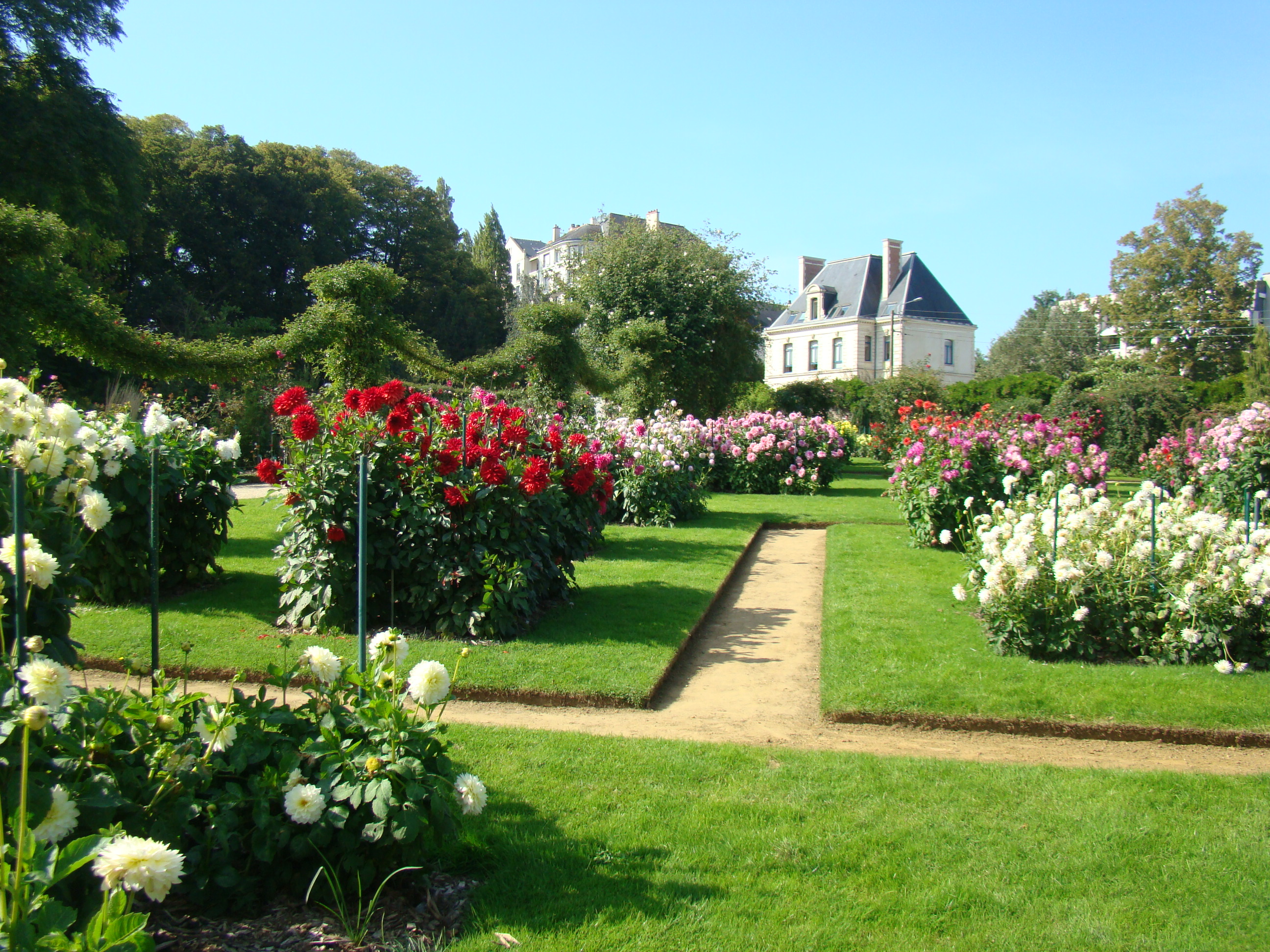
Thabor parc

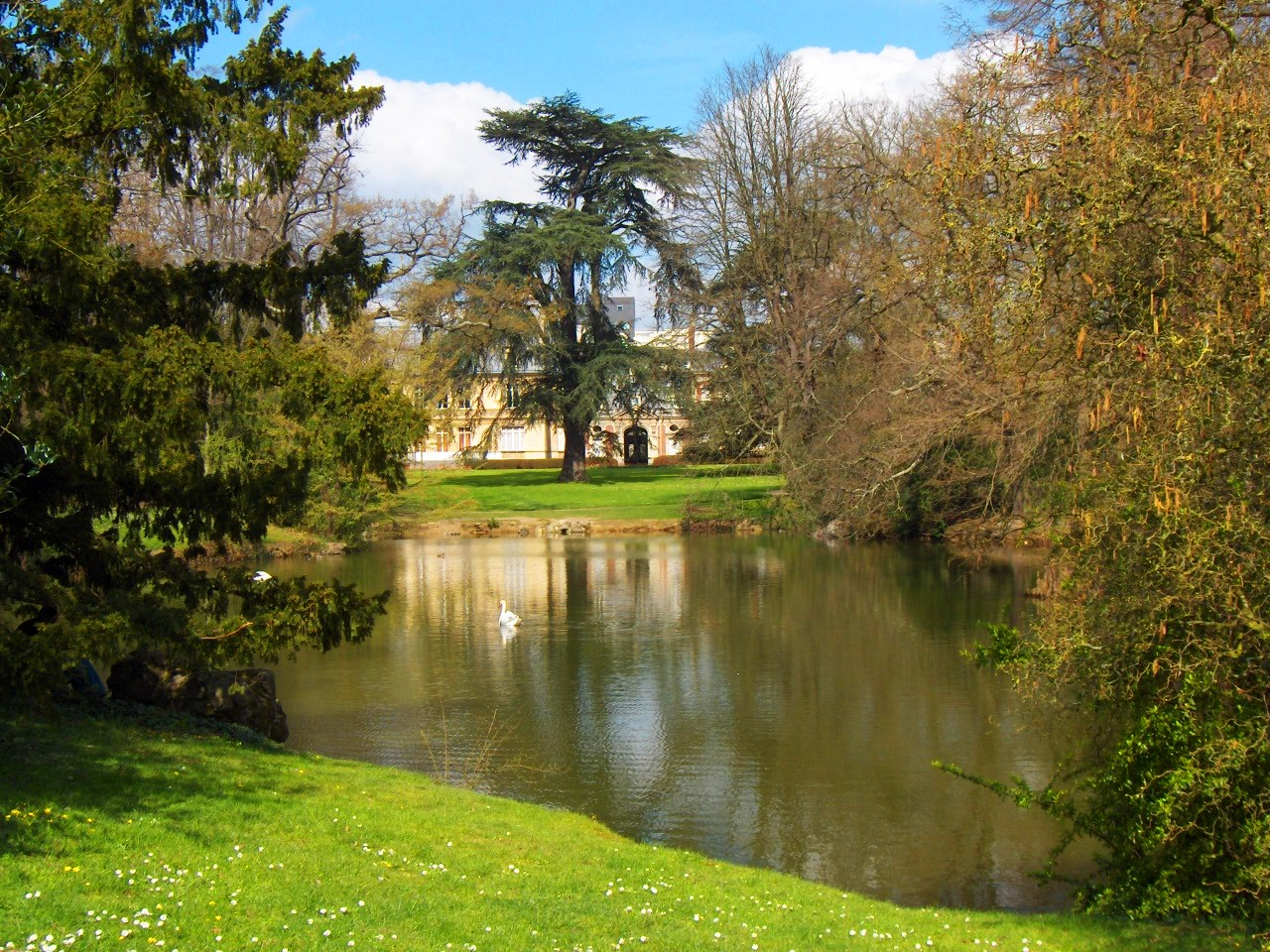
Oberthür parc

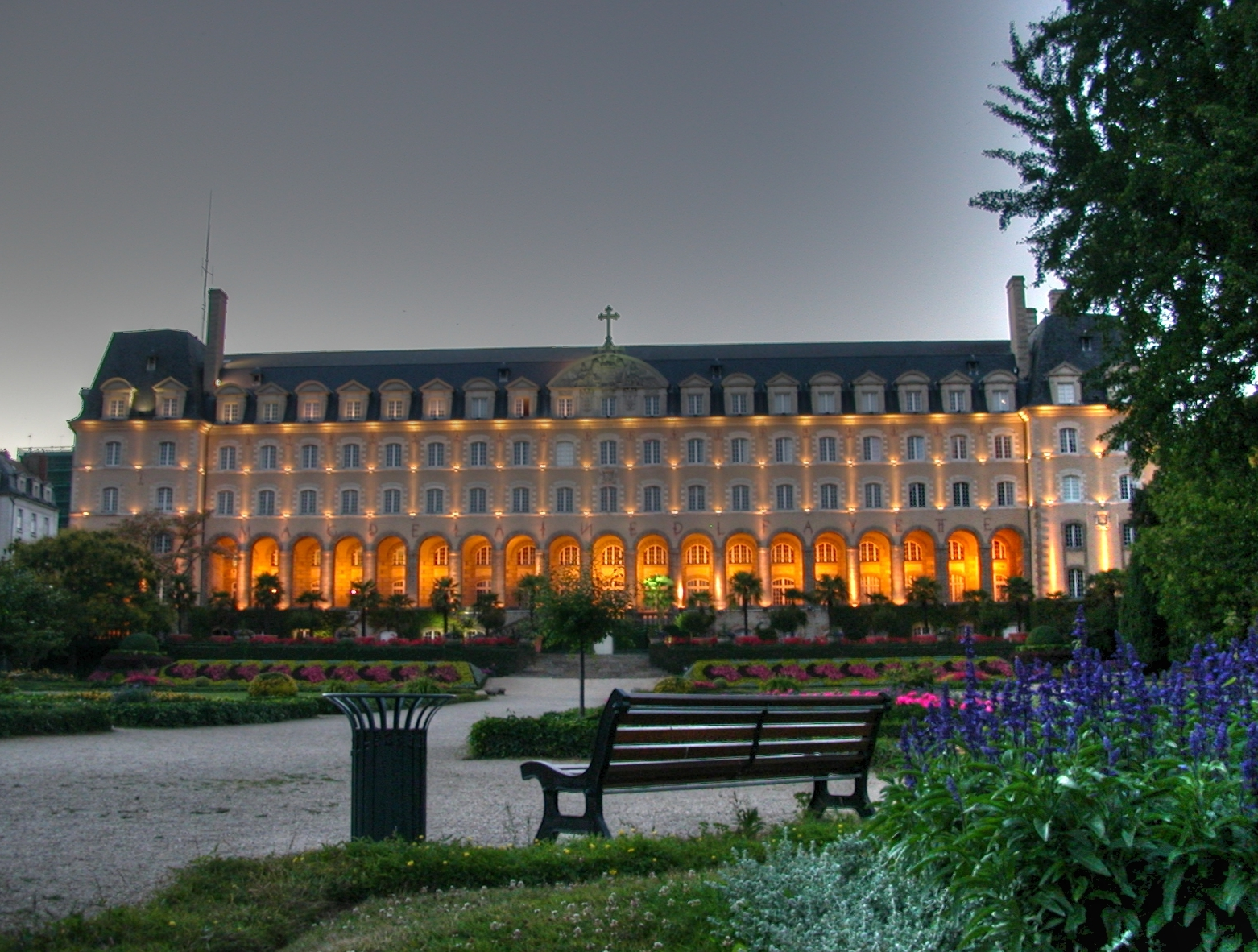
Saint-Georges garden

Parc du Thabor contains a compact but significant botanical garden, the Jardin botanique du Thabor. The University of Rennes, with a campus in the city's eastern section, also contains a botanical garden and collections (the Jardin botanique de l'Université de Rennes).

== Economy ==
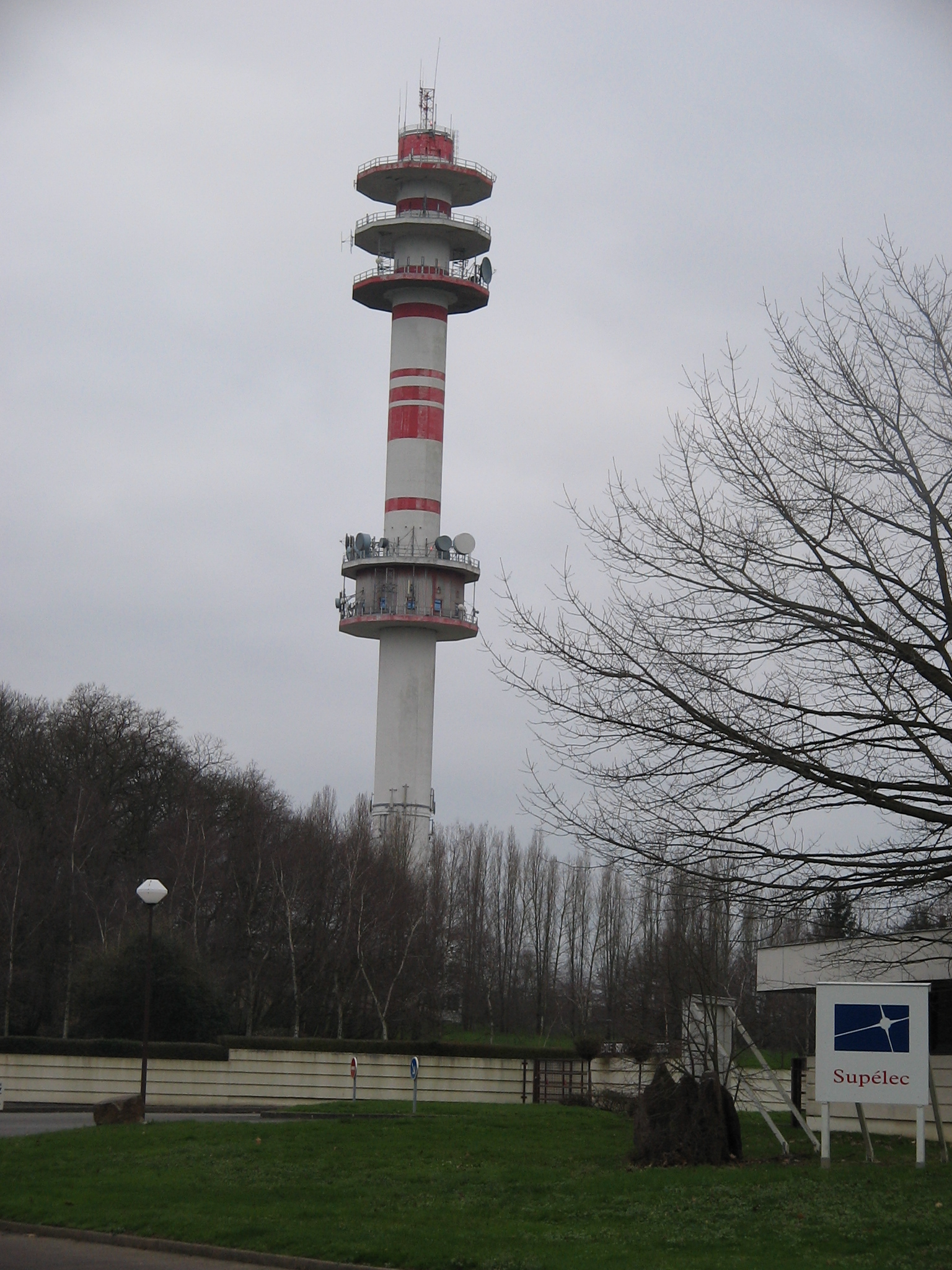
Technopole Atalante

The local economy is based on car manufacturing, telecommunications, the digital sector and agrifood.

The telecommunications firm Orange (ex-France Telecom) is the largest private employer in the metropolitan area of Rennes with a workforce of 5000 people. Stellantis is the second largest private employer, with 2,000 employees. Stellantis (ex-PSA Peugeot-Citröen) opened a manufacturing plant at La Janais in Chartres-de-Bretagne in 1961. Technicolor, one of the biggest TV and cinema broadcasting firms in the world, employs over 500 people.

Rennes has the second largest concentration of digital and ICT firms in France after Paris (with well-known companies and startups like Atos, Google, Neosoft, Orange S.A., Thales, Ericsson, Harmonic France, STmicroelectronics, Technicolor R&D, Ubisoft, HelloWork, Capgemini, OVH, Dassault Systèmes, Delta Dore, Canon, Artefacto, Enensys Technologies, Exfo, Mitsubishi Electric R&D Europe, Digitaleo, Kelbillet, Klaxoon, Sopra Group, Niji, and Airbus Cybersecurity). Rennes was one of the first French cities to receive French Tech accreditation, in November 2014. Moreover, Rennes has the third highest public research potential in the digital and ICT sectors in France, after Paris and Grenoble, with 3,000 people working in 10 laboratories, including the well-known IRISA, IETR, IRMAR, DGA-MI (cyberdefense), and SATIE. It also has the third highest innovation potential in the French agrifood industry, with many firms in this field (Lactalis, Triballat Sojasun, Coralis, Panavi, Bridor, Groupe Avril, Loïc Raison, Groupe Roullier, Sanders, etc.), an agro campus (Agrocampus Ouest) and a large international and professional expo, SPACE (held every September).

Other large firms located in Rennes include the restaurant conglomerate Groupe Le Duff (owners of Brioche Dorée, Bruegger's, La Madeleine, Mimi's Cafe, Timothy's World Coffee), Ouest-France, the most-read French-language newspaper in the world (with a circulation of 800,000 daily copies), and Samsic Service (cleanliness, industrial safety, job search, etc.).

== Culture ==
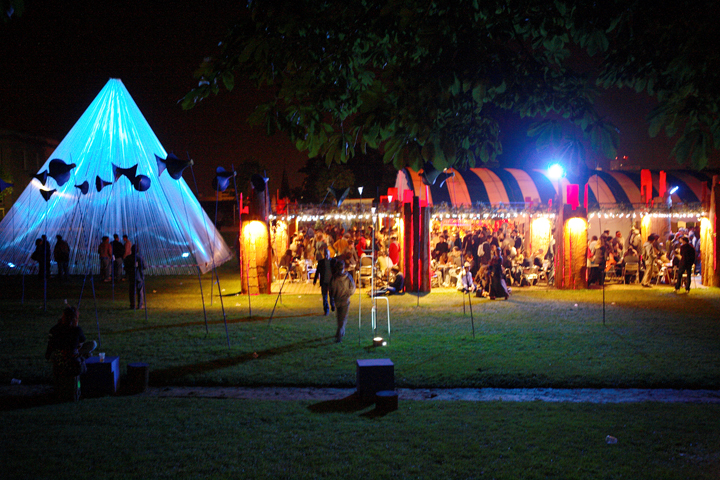
A festival by night at Thabor Park

Cultural plaza with cinema, Brittany museum, library, science space, planetarium, youth house, shopping centres or concert and exhibition halls

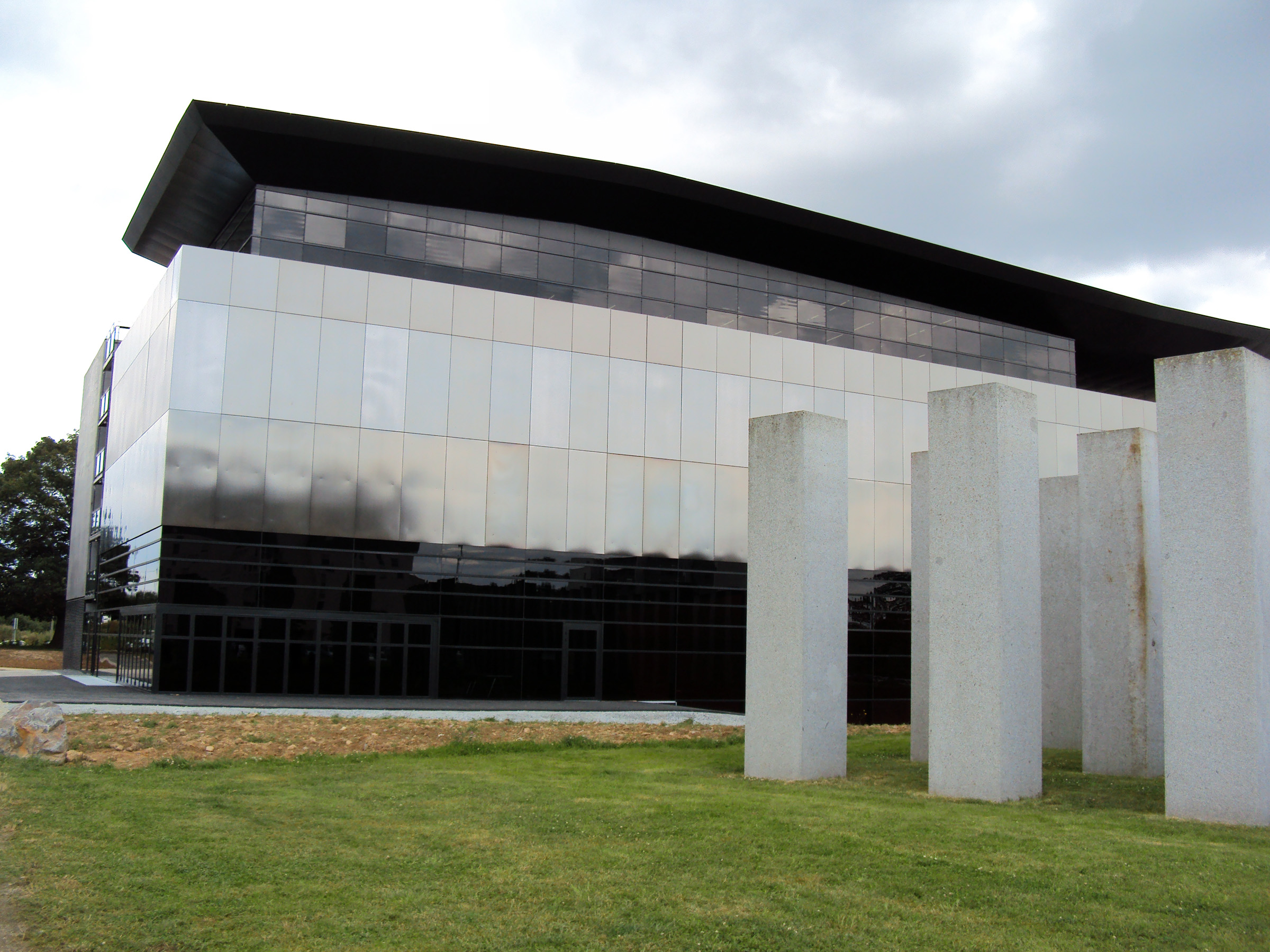
Brittany FRAC (Regional Fund for Contemporary Art)

Rennes is known as one of the most festive cities in France. It invests heavily in arts and culture and a number of its festivals such as the music festival Les Transmusicales, Les Tombées de la Nuit, Mythos, Stunfest (fighting game competition) and Travelling (a film festival) are well known throughout the country. During the 1980s, Rennes was often cited as a hub of rock and new wave music in France.

Les Champs Libres is the largest cultural institution in Brittany. They welcome more than a million visitors each year. Organized in a six-story pyramid with views over the city, the library offers 120,000 documents for loan, and there we can find as well the Museum of Brittany, Espace des Sciences and Planetarium.

=== Concert halls ===
Rennes is well-equipped with musical facilities:

- The MusikHall, for large shows (near the airport). (7,000 seats)
- Le Liberté, dedicated to major cultural events and touring shows. (5,300 seats)
- La Cité, dedicated to contemporary music & local artists. (1,150 seats)
- L'Étage (La Liberté), dedicated to contemporary music & local artists. (900 seats)
- Rennes Opera House (650 seats) and National Theatre of Brittany, TNB in French (Vilar room, 950 seats) for the Brittany orchestra.
- The Ubu, an associative concert hall. (500 seats)
- L'Antipode MJC, also an art centre. (500 seats)
- Le MeM/Magic Mirrors, concert hall with dining facilities. (2000 seats)

=== Museums and exhibition places ===
There are also five museums in Rennes:

- Musée des Beaux Arts (Museum of Fine Arts of Rennes). This art museum holds many works by the sculptor Pierre Charles Lenoir
- Musée de Bretagne Museum of Brittany at the Champs Libres, together with the 'espace de sciences' and a planetarium.
- Museum of Farming and Rennes Countryside at Bintinais, south of Rennes.
- Musée des Transmissions (Museum of Broadcasting) at Cesson-Sévigné, east of Rennes city centre.
- FRAC Bretagne Fond Régional d'Art contemporain (Regional Fund for Contemporary Art).

In addition, there are art facilities such as 40mcube exhibition space or the centre for contemporary art La Criée.

There are also miscellaneous cultural venues, including the dance-dedicated Triange and two "Art et Essai" (arthouse) cinemas, l'Arvor and Cine TNB. Surrounding cities house many other cultural sites.

=== Media ===
Rennes was one of the first cities in France to have its own local television channel, TV Rennes, created in 1987.

France 3 Bretagne, part of France's national public television network, France Télévisions, has a television station in the city which broadcast local news, current affairs, sport and weather to across the Brittany region.

Local radio stations based in Rennes are Ici Armorique, Hit West, Radio Campus, Canal B, Radio Caroline, Radio Rennes, and Radio Laser.

Rennes's local newspapers and magazines are Ouest-France, Le Peuple breton, and Le Mensuel de Rennes.

=== Local culture ===
==== Local languages ====
Flag of Brittany

In Brittany, two regional languages are spoken: Breton and Gallo. In Rennes, as part of Upper Brittany, Gallo was predominantly spoken as the local language, although Breton has always been spoken by migrants from the west of the region (Lower Brittany).

Nowadays, the Breton language is taught in two Diwan schools, some bilingual public and Catholic schools, in evening courses, and in university.

The municipality launched a linguistic plan through Ya d'ar brezhoneg on 24 January 2008.

In 2008, 2.87% of primary school children were enrolled in bilingual primary schools, and the number of pupils enrolled in these schools is steadily growing.

==== Local food ====
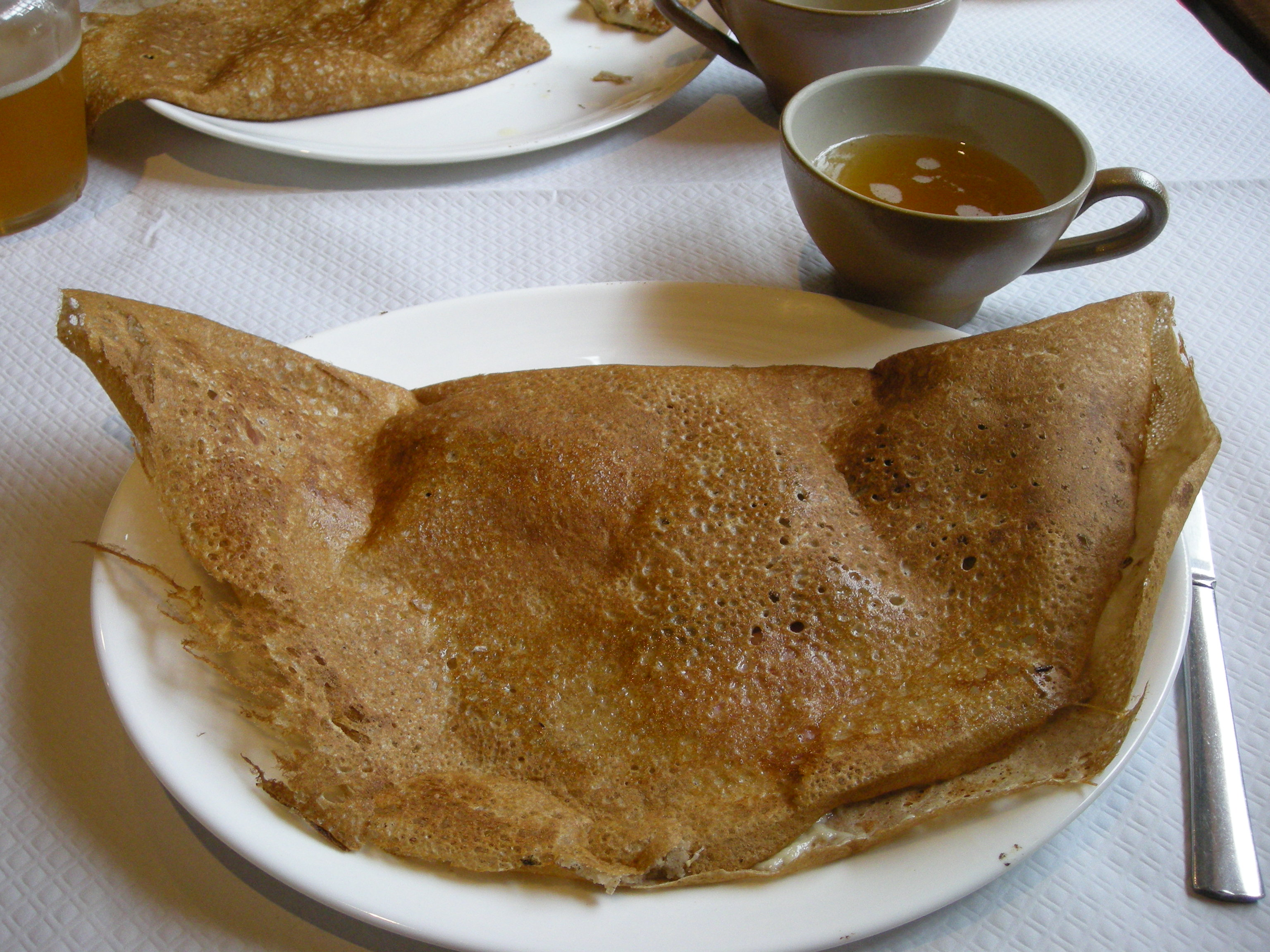
Cider and galette with eggs, ham and cheese

Specialties from Rennes include:

- Breton galette
- Galette-saucisse
- Crêpe
- Cider

Many other Breton specialties (seafood, milk, vegetables, cheese, meat) are seen at the Marché des Lices, a weekly market held every Saturday morning (one of the largest markets in France).

== Education ==
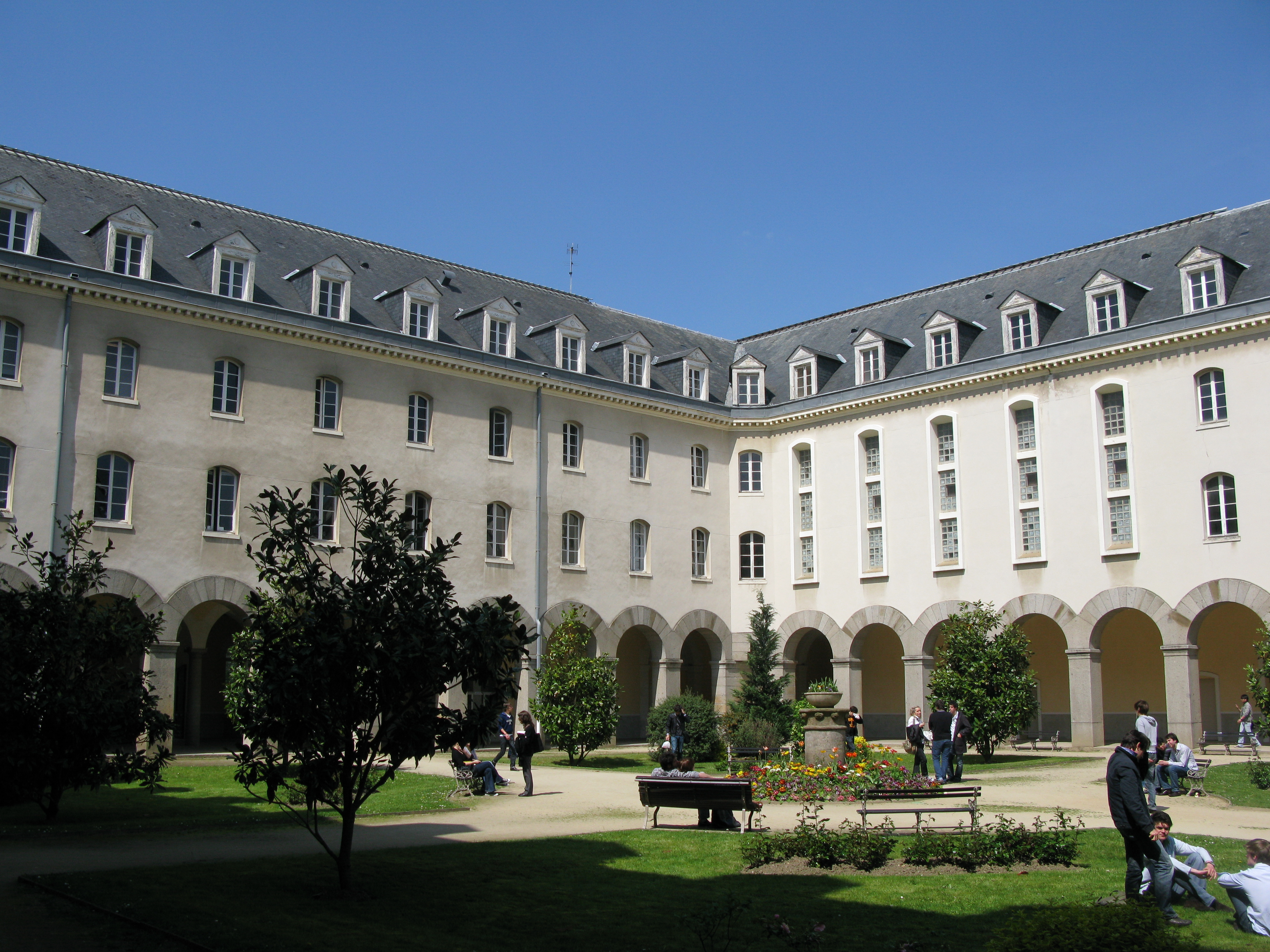
Rennes 1 University

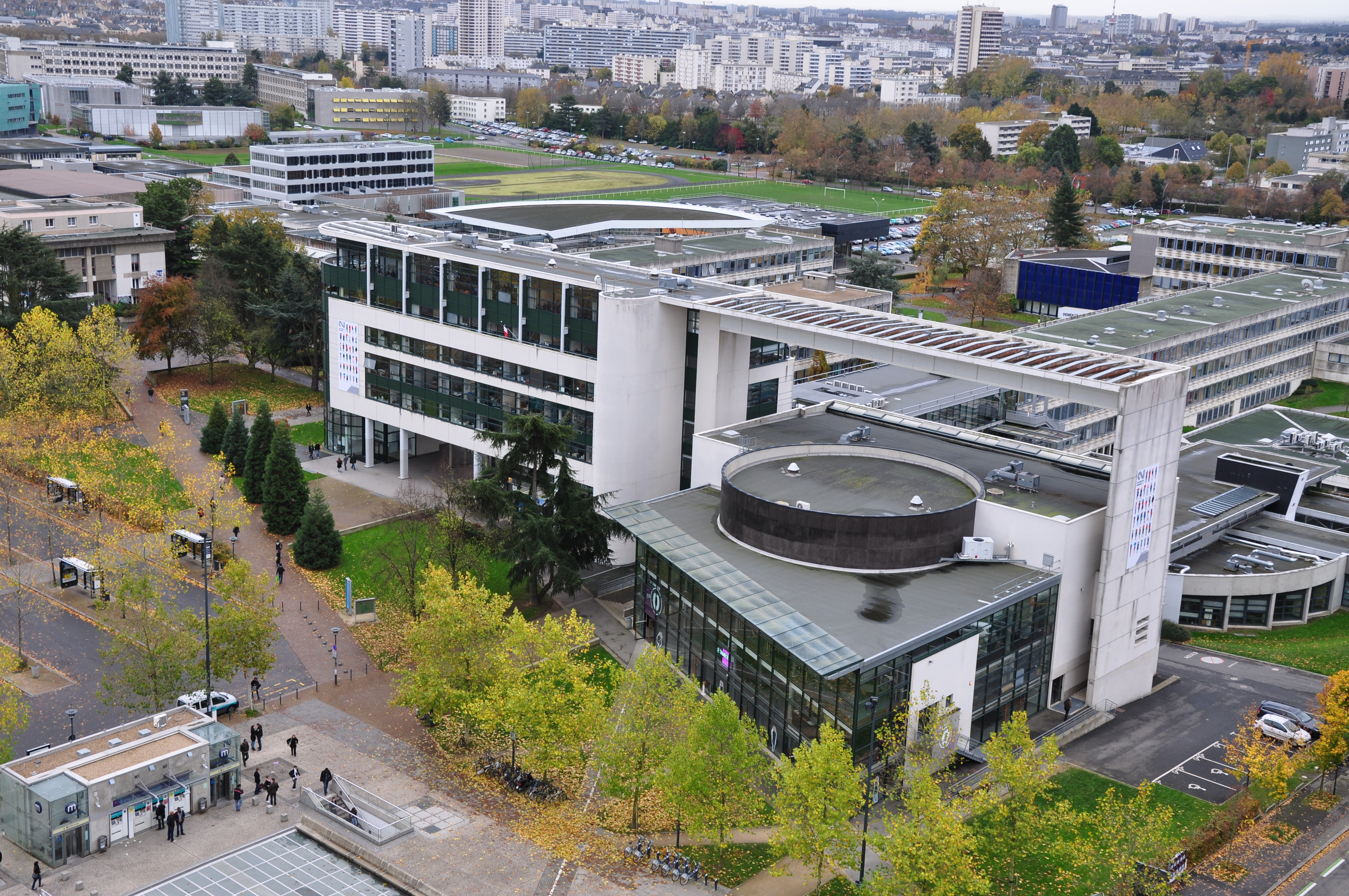
Campus of Villejean

The Rennes agglomeration has a large student population (around 63,000).

The city has two main universities; Université de Rennes, which offers courses in science, technology, medicine, philosophy, law, management, and economics, and Université Rennes 2, which has courses in the arts, literature, languages, communication, human and social sciences, and sport. The official website of Université Rennes 2 identifies the facility as "the largest research and higher learning institution in Arts, Literature, Languages, Social Sciences and Humanities in the West of France."

There are a few École Supérieures in Rennes, such as the École Normale Supérieure de Rennes on the Ker Lann campus just outside Rennes, the Institut d'études politiques de Rennes, and the ESC Rennes School of Business.

There are also branches of the École Supérieure d'Électricité – Supélec and Telecom Bretagne in the east of the city (Cesson-Sévigné), a campus of the École pour l'informatique et les nouvelles technologies, a campus of the École pour l'informatique et les techniques avancées, and the Institut National des Sciences Appliquées, a grande école which is next to the École nationale supérieure de chimie de Rennes.

The computer science and applied mathematics research institute, IRISA, is located on the campus of the Université des Sciences, near Cesson-Sévigné. The Délégation Générale pour l'Armement (defence procurement agency) operates the CELAR research centre, dedicated to electronics and computing, in the neighbouring town of Bruz.

The Catholic University of Rennes (Institut Catholique de Rennes) is a Catholic university founded in 1989.

The city is also home to an American study abroad program for high school students, School Year Abroad, in which students are immersed in French culture through five classes in the language and a nine-month home stay.

The École Compleméntaire Japonaise de Rennes (レンヌ補習授業校 Rennu Hoshū Jugyō Kō), a part-time Japanese supplementary school, is based in the Collège Anne de Bretagne in Rennes.

== Sport ==
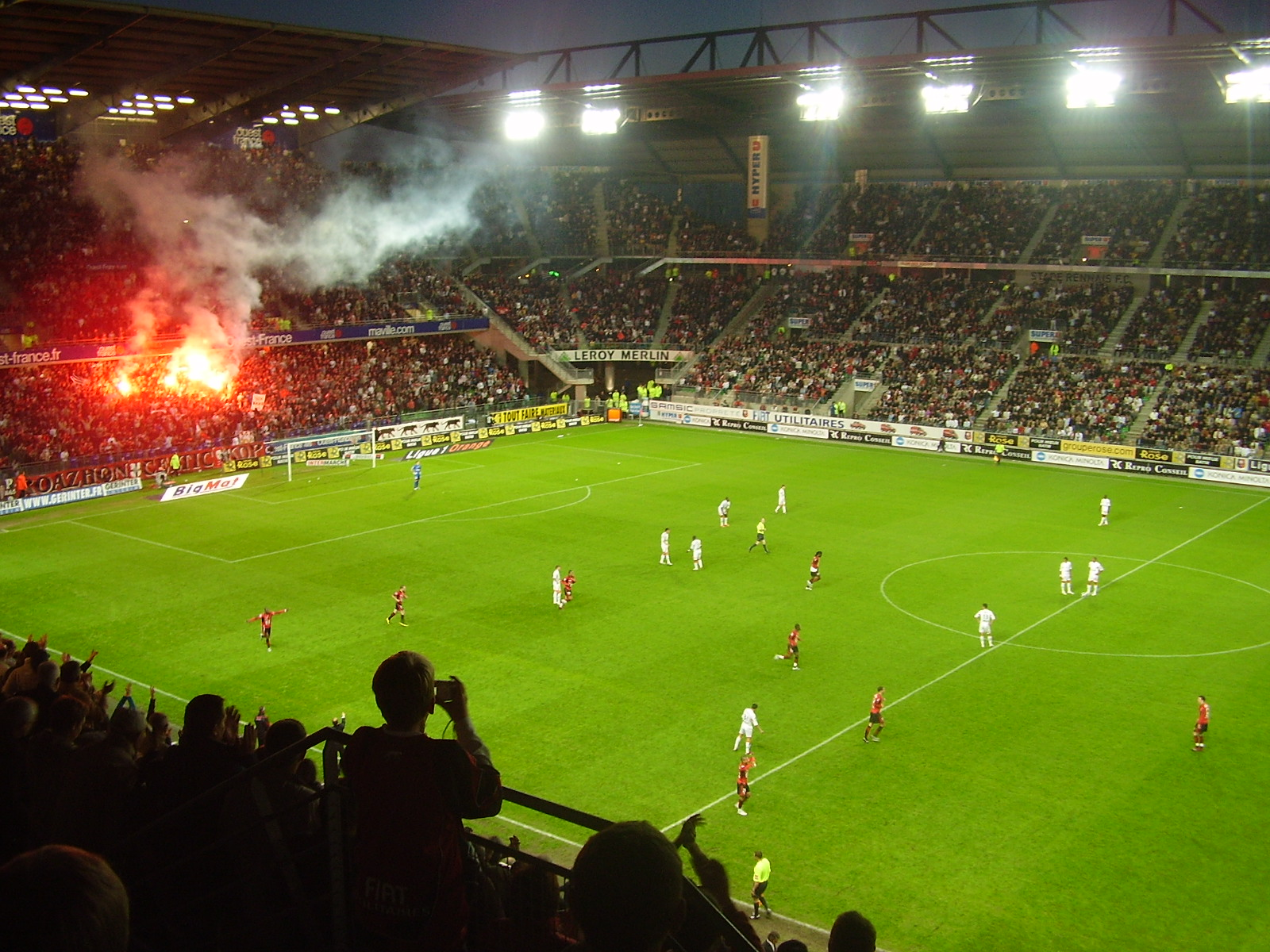
Flares of the Roazhon Celtic Kop at the Roazhon Park

=== Football club ===
- Rennes is home to Stade Rennais F.C., who play in Ligue 1 at the Roazhon Park stadium.

=== Handball ===
- Cesson-Sévigné is home to Cesson-Rennes-Métropole handball, who play in division 1.

=== Road bicycle ===
- Rennes is home to Fortuneo-Vital Concept (UCI Team Code: BSE), a professional cycling team.

=== Rugby ===
- Rennes is home to Stade Rennais Rugby, a women's rugby team who play in Championnat de France de rugby à XV féminin, the top national club competition for women's rugby union in France. Rennes is also home to REC Rugby, a men's team competing in Fédérale 1, the fourth tier of the Men's Rugby Union championship.

== Transport ==
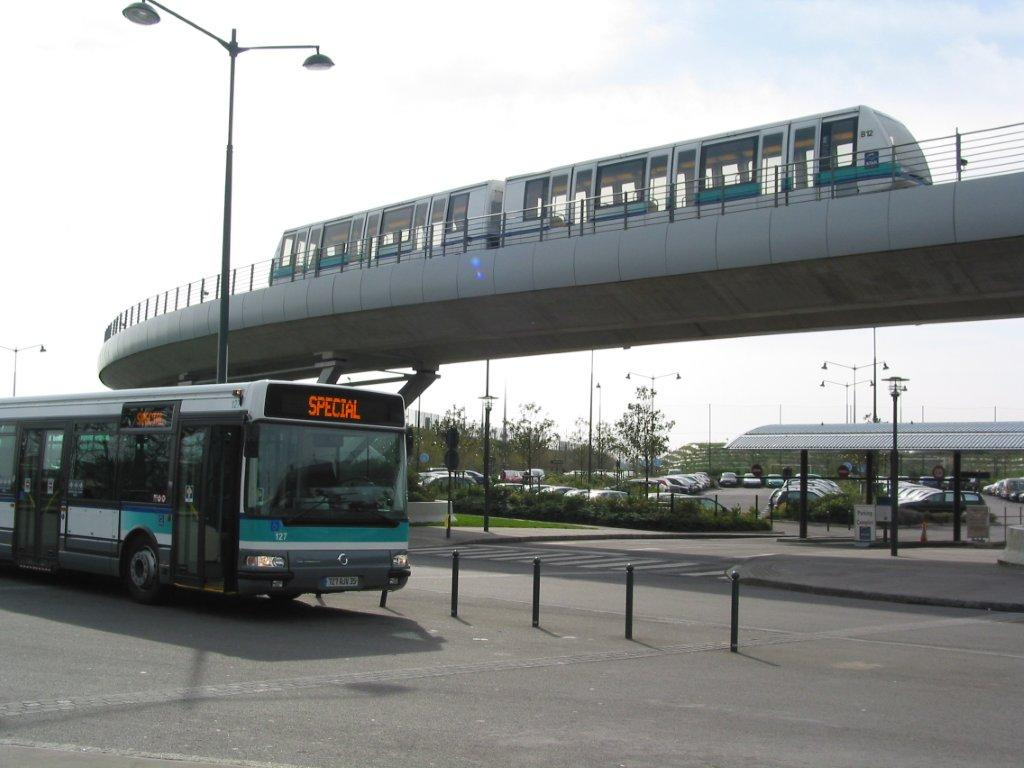
An elevated light metro section

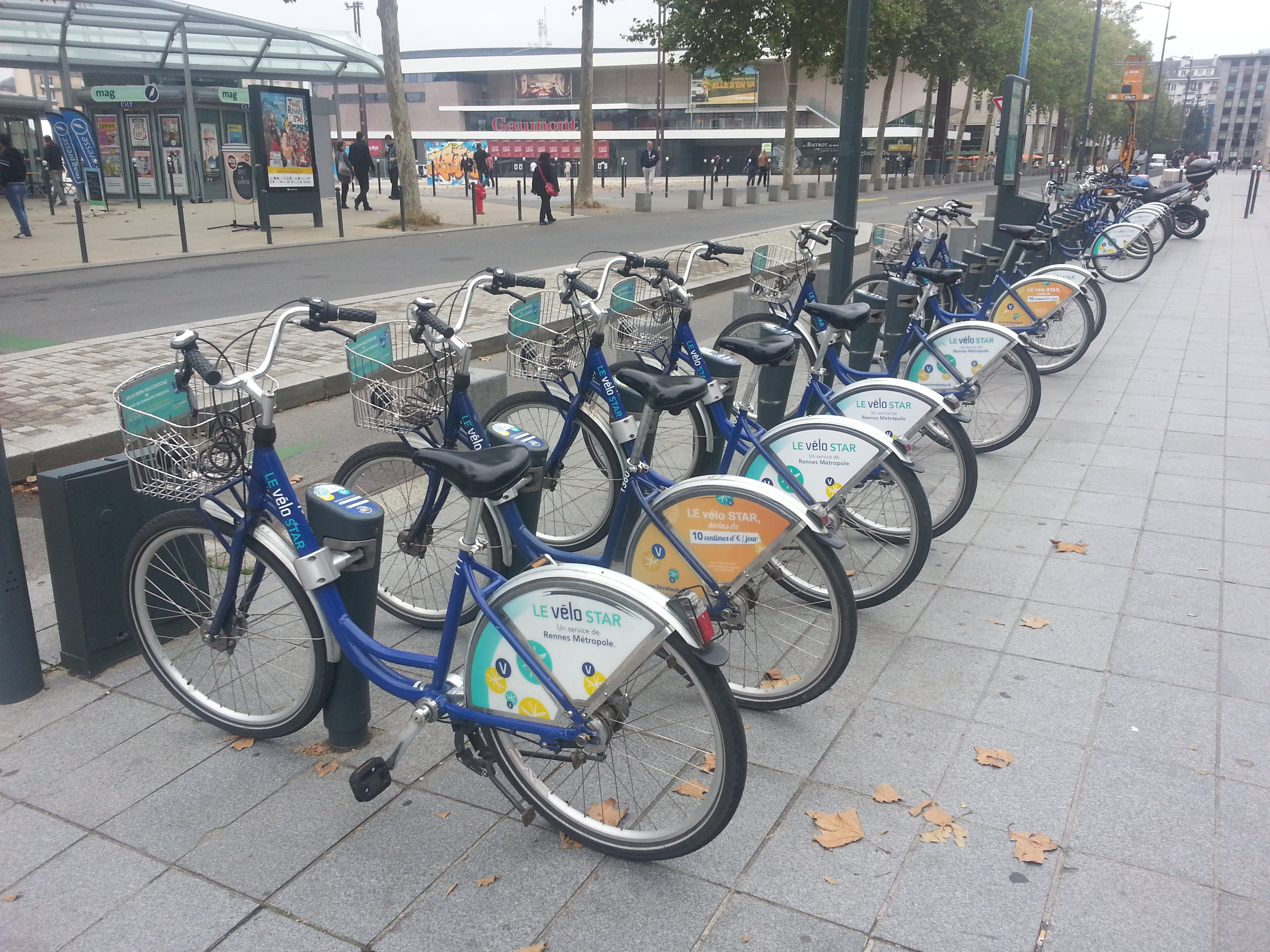
VéloStar

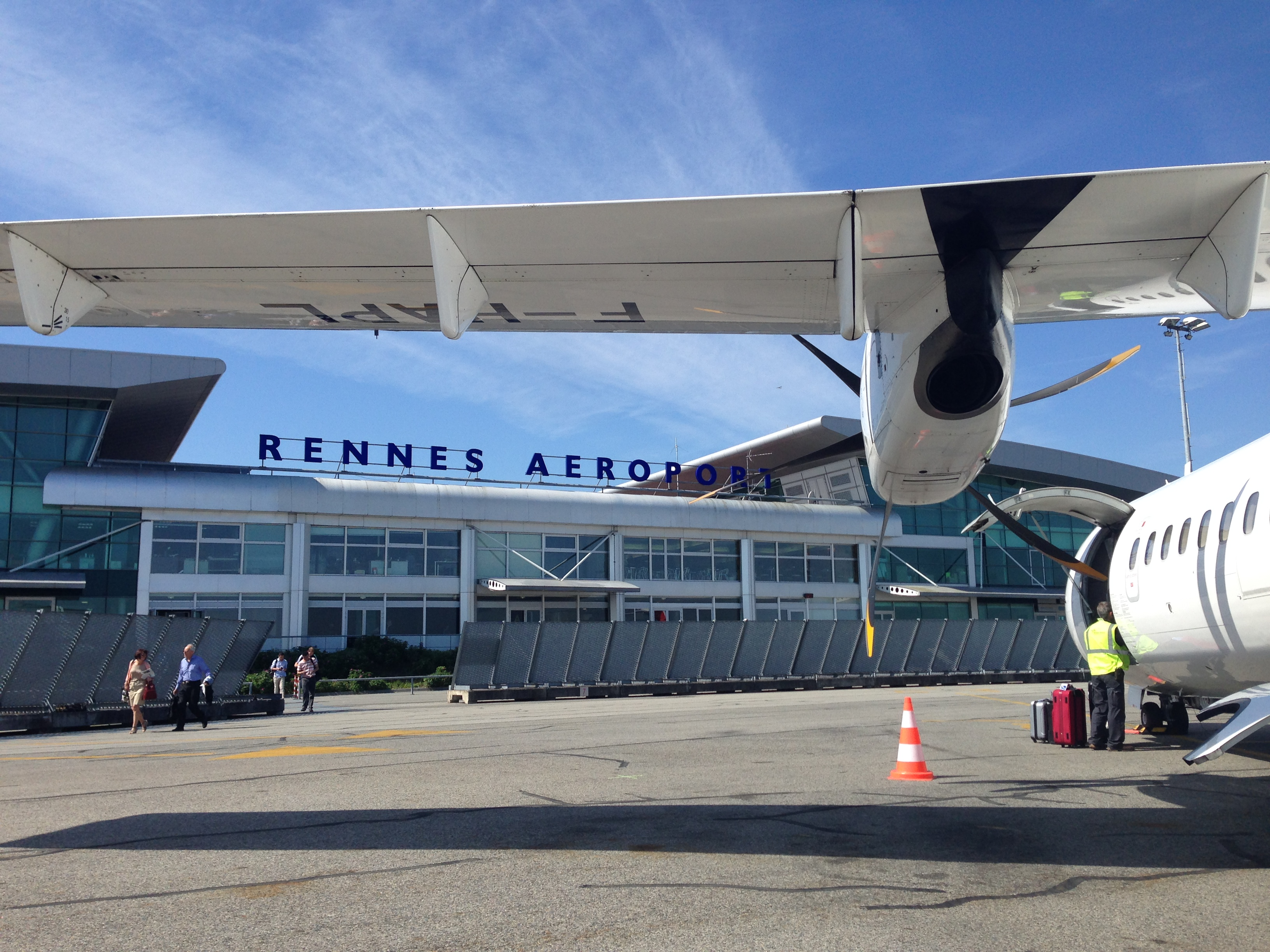
Rennes Airport

Rennes has well-developed national road, rail and air links.

=== Public transport ===
Local transport is based primarily on an extensive bus network (65 lines) and a light metro line that was inaugurated in March 2002 and cost €500 million to build. The driverless Rennes Metro (VAL) is 9.4 km (5.8 mi) in length and has 15 stations, including one designed by architect Norman Foster (La Poterie station). A second light metro line known as Line B was opened on 20 September 2022, after 8 years of construction.

=== Cycling ===
Rennes provides another mode of local transport: a bike sharing system with 900 bicycles (named STAR, le vélo). Rennes created the first system of modern French bike sharing in 1998.

=== Roads ===
The city is an important hub of Brittany's motorway network and is surrounded by a ring road, the Rocade (national road 136). The construction of the bypass was started in 1968 and completed in 1999. It is 31 km (19.3 mi) long, has 2 lanes each way (sometimes 3 lanes) and is toll-free. Many other expressways are connected to the Rennes ring road for local and regional service. By road, Saint-Malo can be reached in 45 minutes, Nantes in 1 hour, Brest in 2 hours and 30 minutes, Paris in 4 hours, Bordeaux in 5 hours, and Brussels in 6 hours and 30 minutes.

=== Railway ===
Rennes has a major French railway station, the Gare de Rennes, opened in 1857. Since 2 July 2017, it is now one hour and twenty-seven minutes by TGV high-speed train from Paris (after the extension of the High Speed Rail Line). Train services are available to other major cities in France such as Lyon, Marseille, Lille, and Strasbourg.

Rennes is also an important railway station for regional transport in Brittany. The TER Bretagne provides links to Saint-Malo, Nantes, Redon, Vitré, Saint-Brieuc, Vannes, Laval, Brest and many other regional cities. It is served by Gares station on the VAL Rennes Metro.

=== Airport ===
Rennes is served by Rennes Brittany Airport (Saint-Jacques), located 7 kilometres (4.3 mi) from the centre to the south-west in the commune Saint-Jacques-de-la-Lande.

== Notable people ==
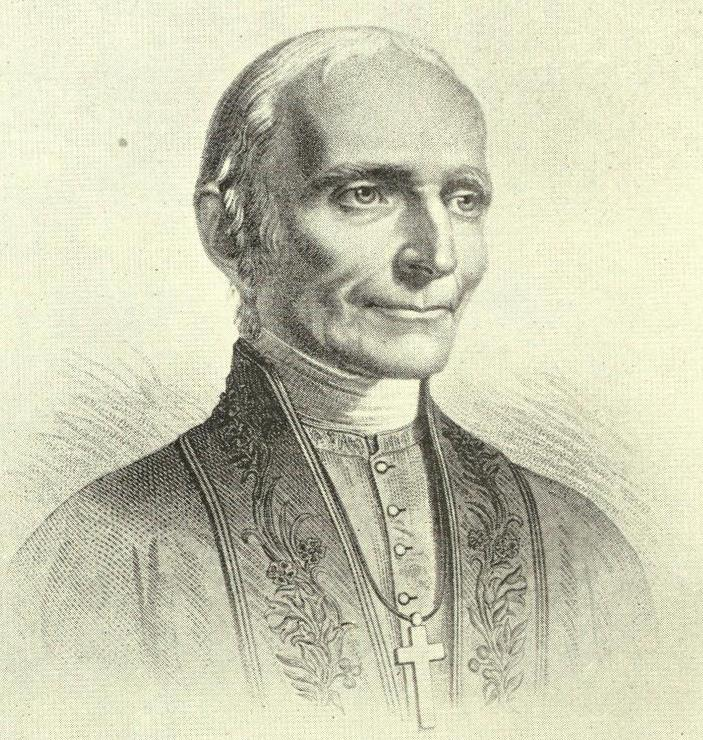
Simon Bruté, 1891

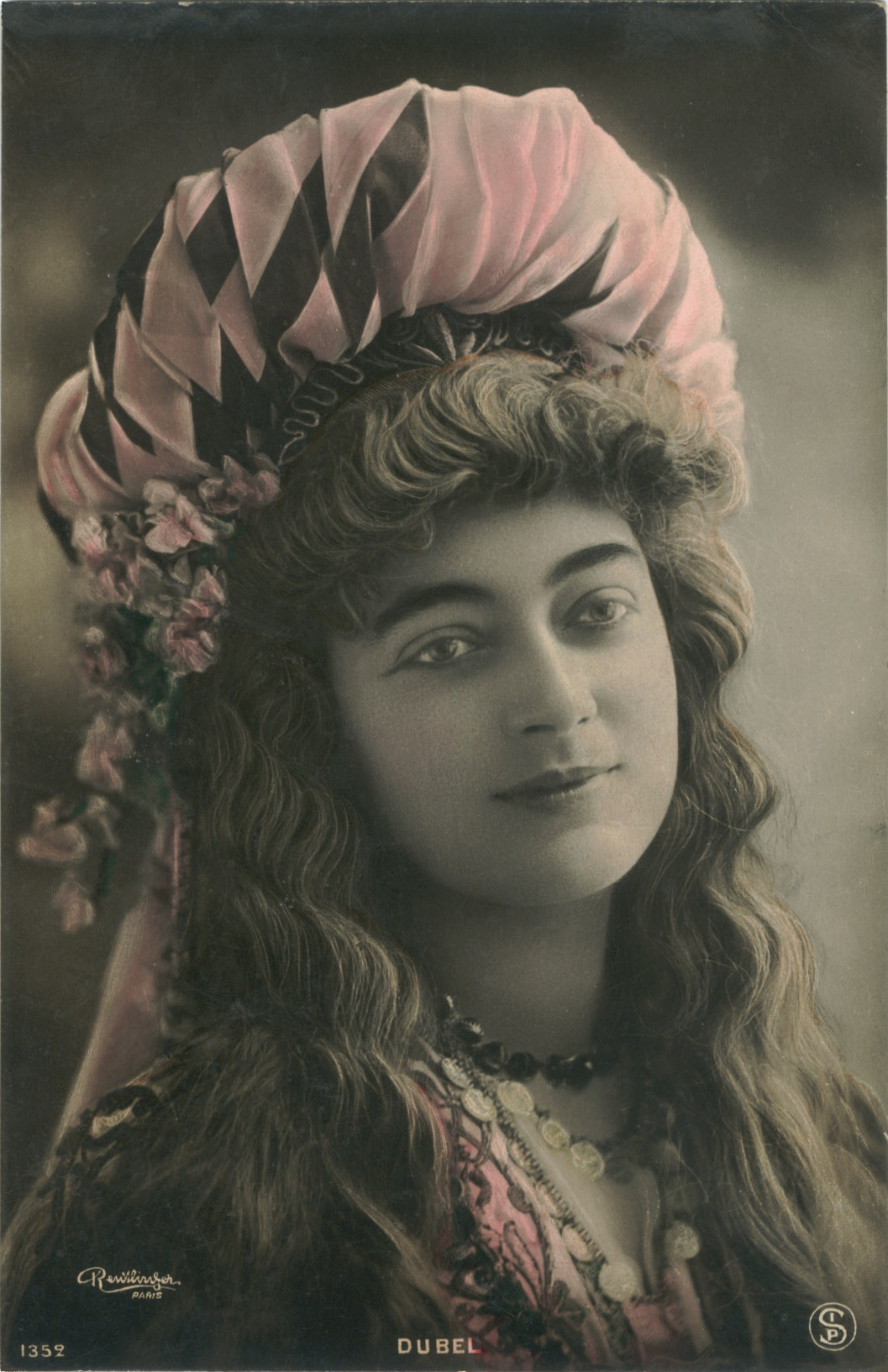
Yvonne Dubel

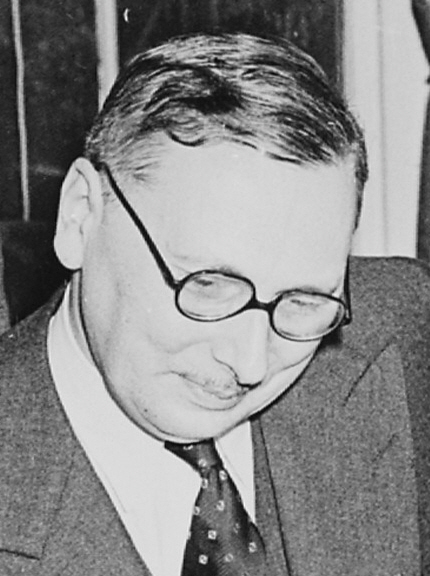
Rene Pleven, 1951

- Soazig Aaron (born 1949), writer
- Bertrand d'Argentré (1519–1590), jurist and historian, seneschal of Rennes in 1547, and later head of the presidial court
- Emmanuel-Marie Blain de Saint-Aubin (1833–1883), educator, songwriter, story-teller and translator
- Georges Ernest Boulanger (1837–1891), general and politician, born in Rennes.
- Jean-Claude Bourlès (born 1937), writer and traveler
- Simon William Gabriel Bruté de Rémur (1779–1839), a French missionary in the US.
- Thomas Conecte (died 1434), a Carmelite friar and preacher.
- Nicolas Courjal (born 1973), operatic bass
- Maxime Daniel (born 1991), professional cyclist
- Madeleine Desroseaux (1873–1939), poet and novelist
- Yvonne Dubel (1881–1958), soprano opera singer
- Félix Dujardin (1801–1860), professor and dean of the University of Rennes, famous parasitologist
- Joseph Marie Élisabeth Durocher (1817–1860), geologist.
- Alexandre-Vincent Pineux Duval (1767–1842), dramatist, sailor, architect, actor and theatre manager.
- Viviane Elder (1904–1960), racing driver, aviator and actress
- Julien Louis Geoffroy (1743–1814), a literary critic.
- René Guillou (1903–1958), composer and organist
- François Hériau (born 1983), racing driver
- Auguste Hilarion, comte de Kératry (1769–1859), poet, novelist, literary critic, historian and politician.
- Stanislas Hutin (1930–2026), Jesuit anti-war activist
- Wilson Isidor (born 2000), professional footballer for Sunderland AFC
- Paul Jausions (1835–1870), musicologist specialising in Gregorian chant
- Hélène Jégado (1803–1852), executed serial poisoner
- Louis-René de Caradeuc de La Chalotais (1701–1785), jurist, role in the so-called Brittany Affair.
- Matthieu Lahaye (born 1984), racing driver
- Jean Denis, comte Lanjuinais (1753–1827), politician, lawyer, jurist, journalist and historian.
- Pierre-Emmanuel Le Goff (born 1979), film director, producer and distributor
- Isaac René Guy le Chapelier (1754–1794), jurist and politician during the time of the French Revolution.
- Jacques Legrand (born 1946), linguist and anthropologist, specialising in Mongolian literature, language and history
- Bertrand Meheut (1951–2026), international business executive
- Malika Ménard (born 1987), Miss France 2010
- Sylvaine Neveu (born 1968), chemist and scientific director of the Solvay group
- Louis Pérouas (1923–2011), priest and historian
- François-Henri Pinault (born 1962), chairman and CEO of Kering
- René Pleven (1901–1993), twice President of the Council of Ministers
- Joseph-Marie Quérard (1797–1865), bibliographer.
- Pierre Robiquet (1780–1840), chemist member of the Académie des Sciences, discoverer of codein, asparagin and alizarin, among others
- Valentina Tronel (born 2009), singer, winner of the Junior Eurovision Song Contest 2020 and former member of Kids United Nouvelle Génération
- Charles Vanel (1892–1989), actor
- Marie-Victoire de Lambilly (1767–1813), lawyer, French nobility
- Niagara, a French pop-rock band that achieved popularity both in France and Canada in the 1980s and early 1990s.

== International relations ==
=== Twin towns – sister cities ===
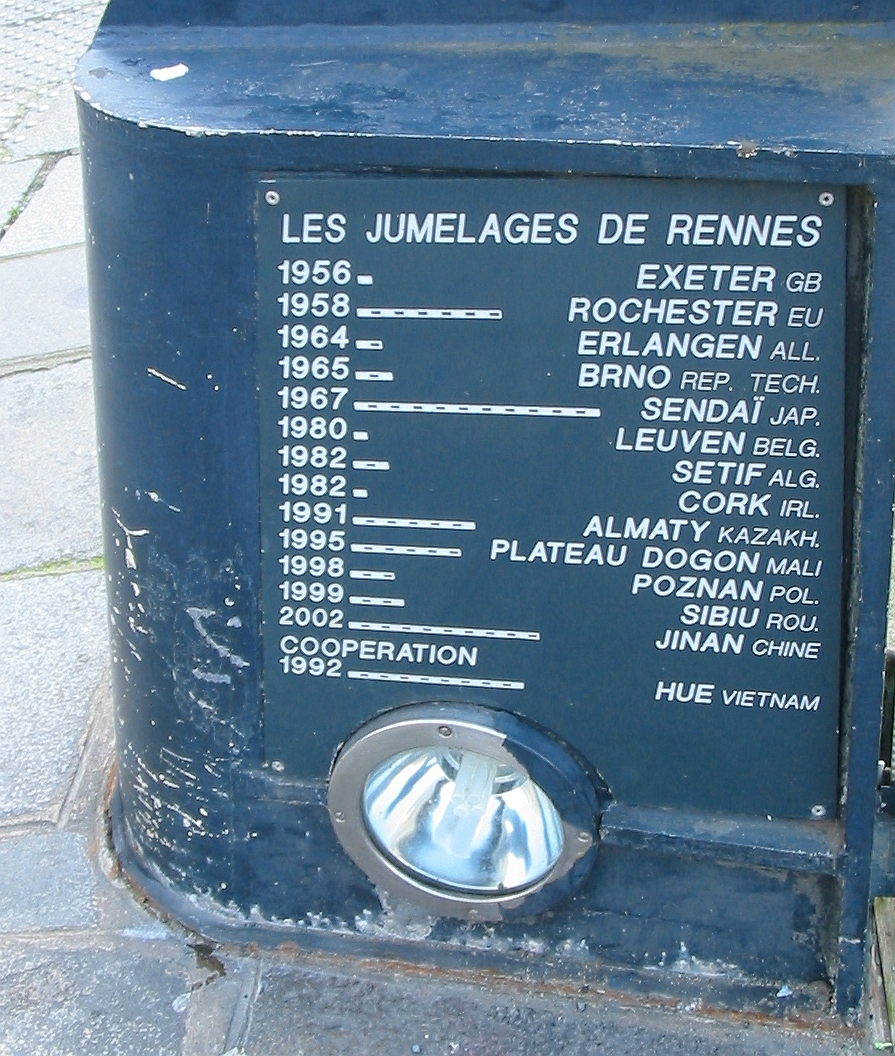
Twinned towns inscribed on the bridge over the central canal (2007)

Rennes is twinned with:

- Exeter, England, UK (since 1956)
- (United States) Rochester, New York, US (since 1958)
- Erlangen, Germany (since 1964)
- Brno, Czech Republic (since 1965)
- Sendai, Japan (since 1967)
- Leuven, Belgium (since 1980)
- Sétif, Algeria (since 1982)
- (Republic of Ireland) Cork, Ireland (since 1982)
- Almaty, Kazakhstan (since 1991)
- Bandiagara Cercle, Mali (since 1995)
- Poznań, Poland (since 1998)
- Sibiu, Romania (since 1999)
- Jinan, China (since 2002)
- Santiago de Compostela, Spain (since 2010)
- (Turkey) Diyarbakır, Türkiye (since 2025 )

=== Other forms of cooperation ===
Friendly towns within France

- Saint-Gilles-du-Mené, France (since 1978)
- Rennes-les-Bains, France (since 1985)

Pacts of cooperation

- Huế, Vietnam (since 1992)

Sponsorship

- Vouziers, France

Rennes also has the only Institut Franco-Américain in France.

== Broadcasting facilities ==
- Transmitter Rennes-Thourie

== Cityscape ==
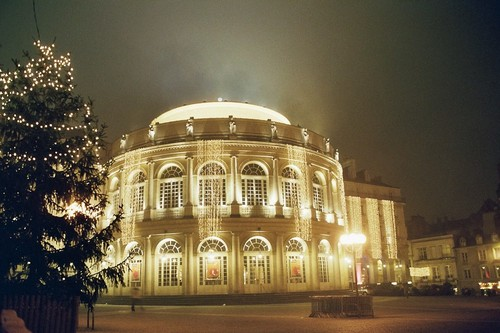
Opera of Rennes

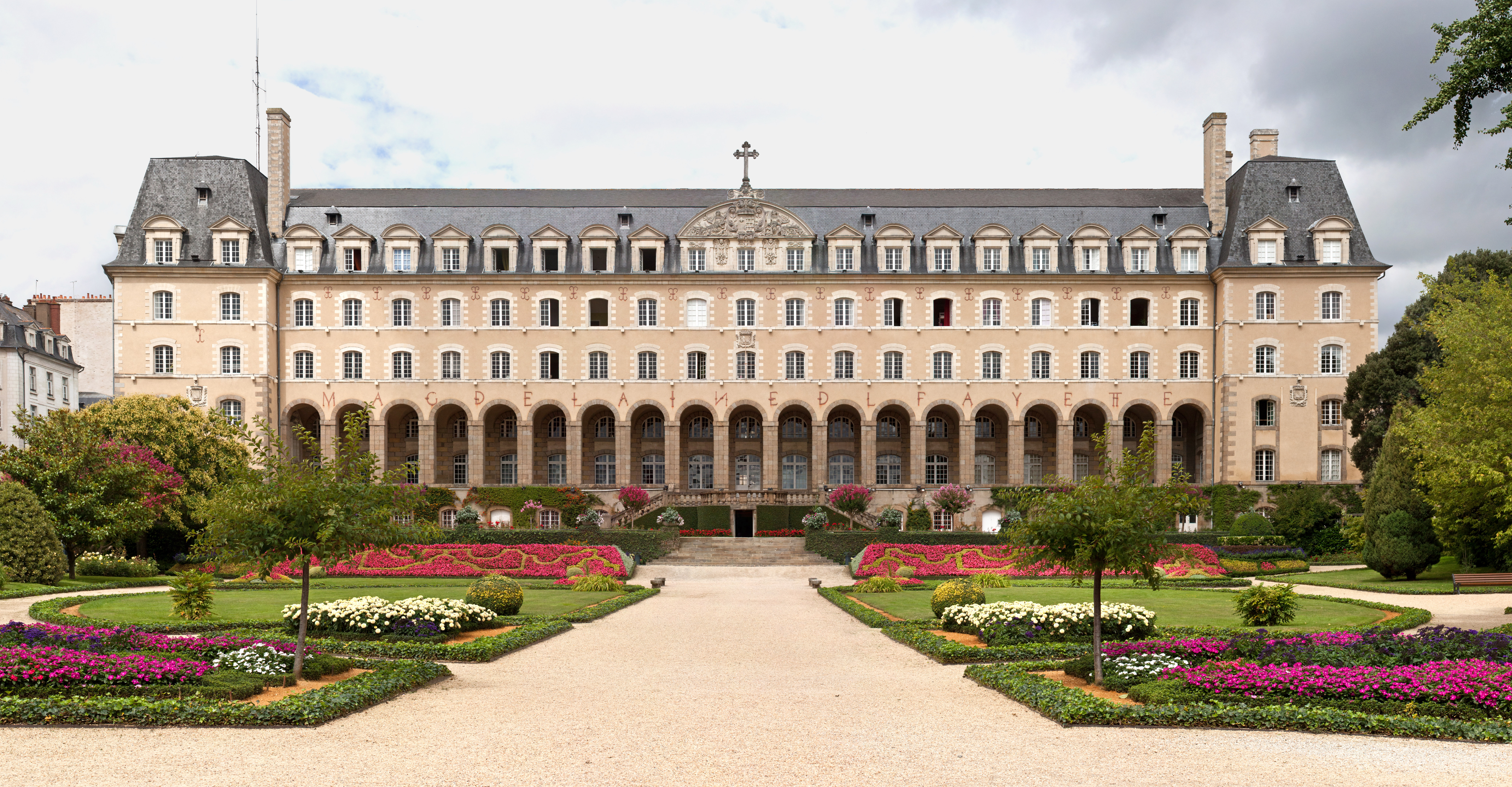
Saint George Palace

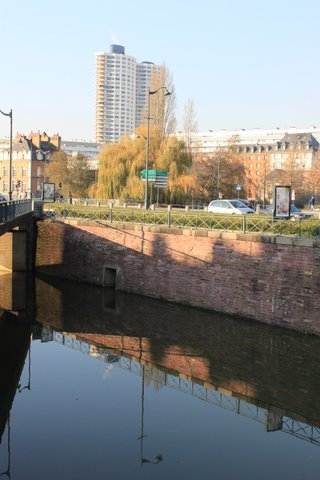
Horizons tower (100 metres/328 ft)

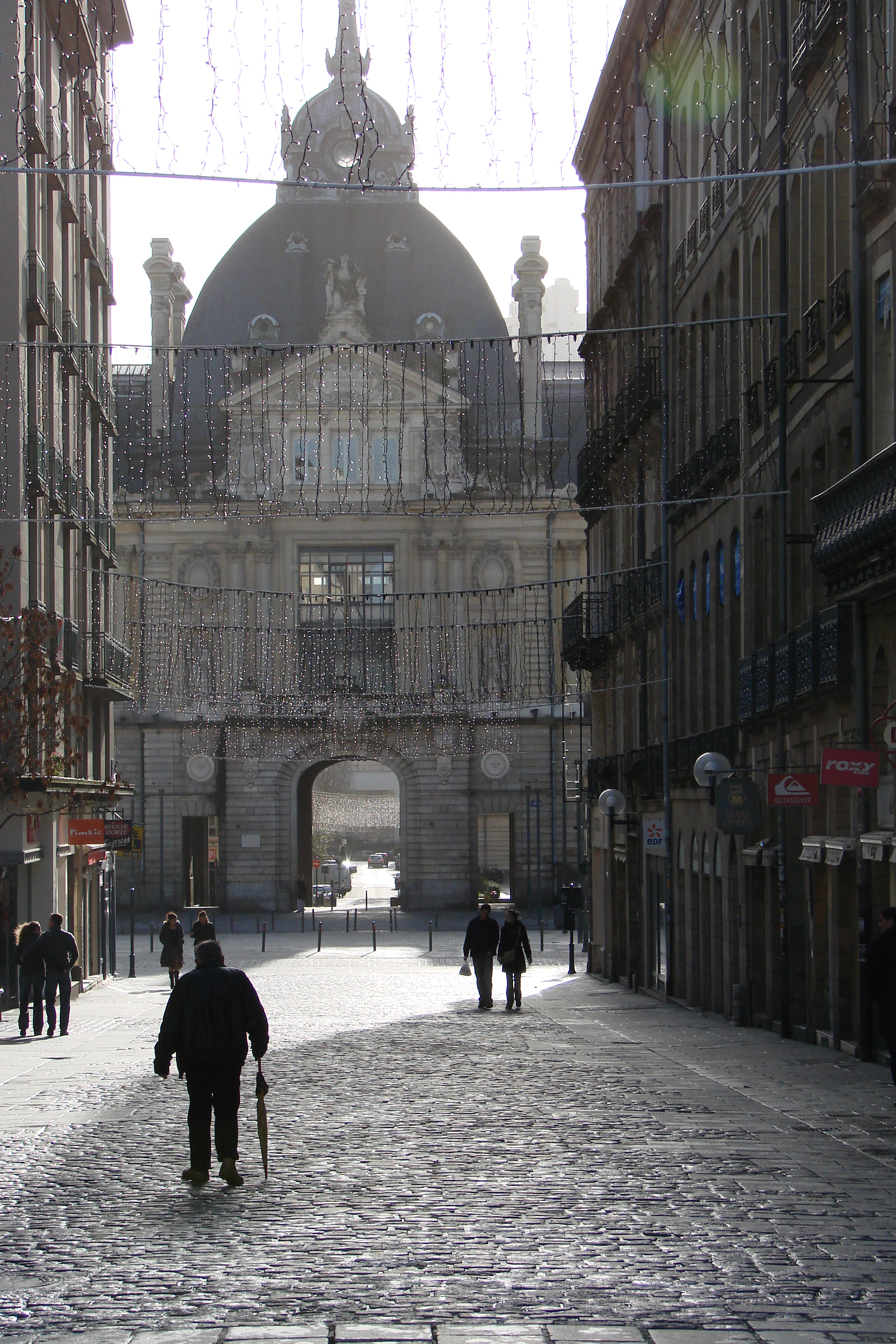
New style city centre

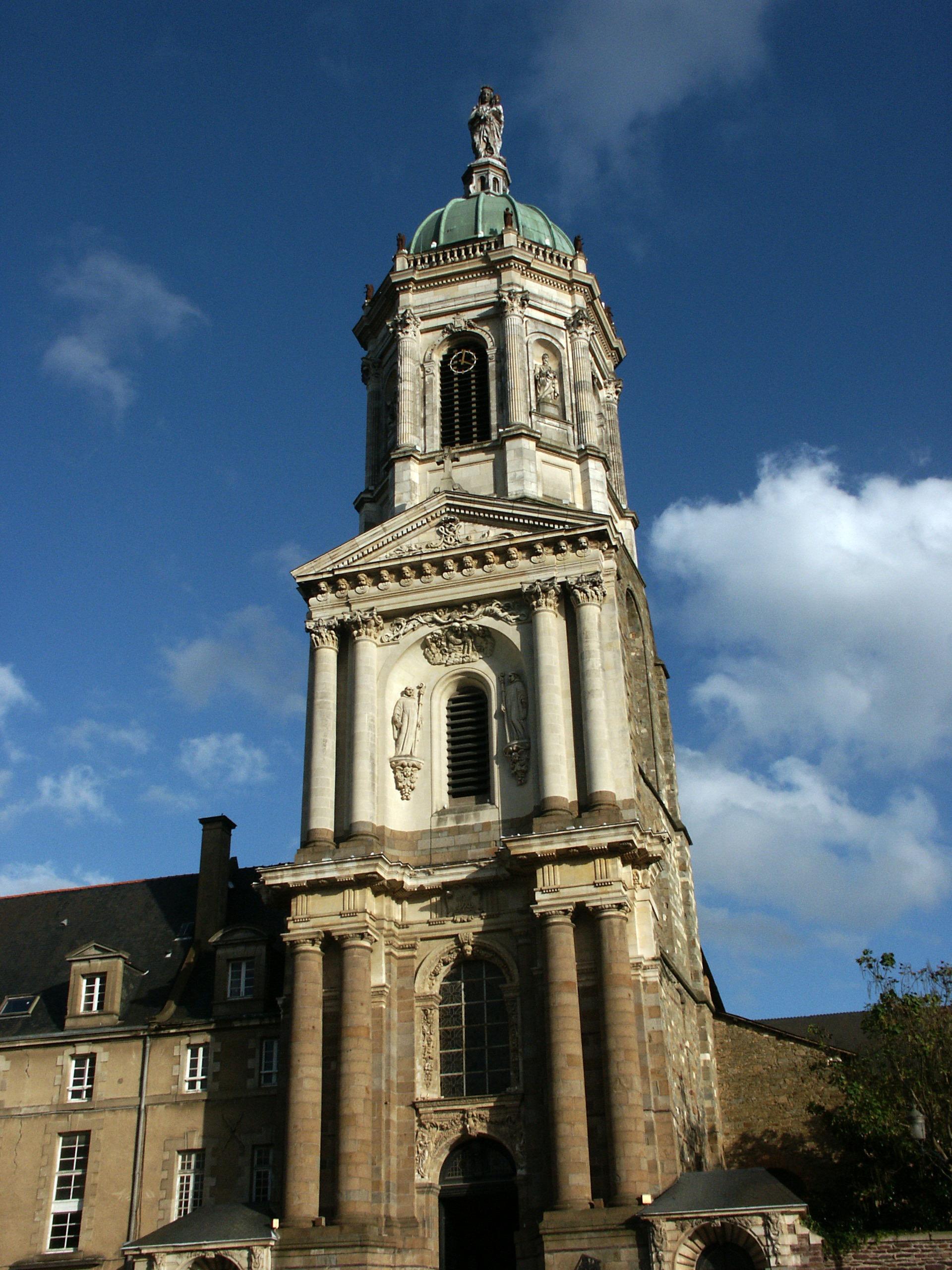
Notre-Dame en Saint-Mélaine church

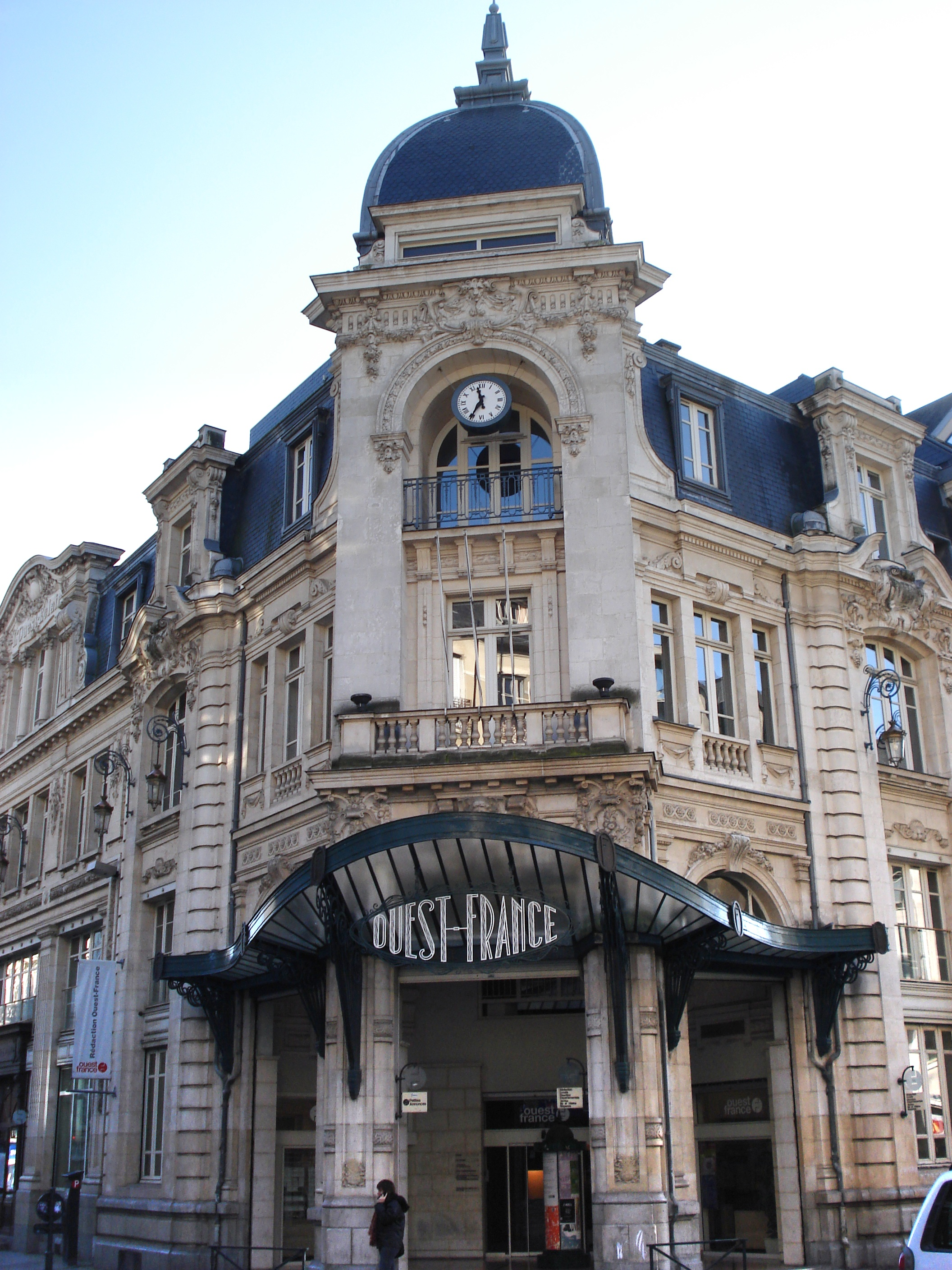
Ouest-France building

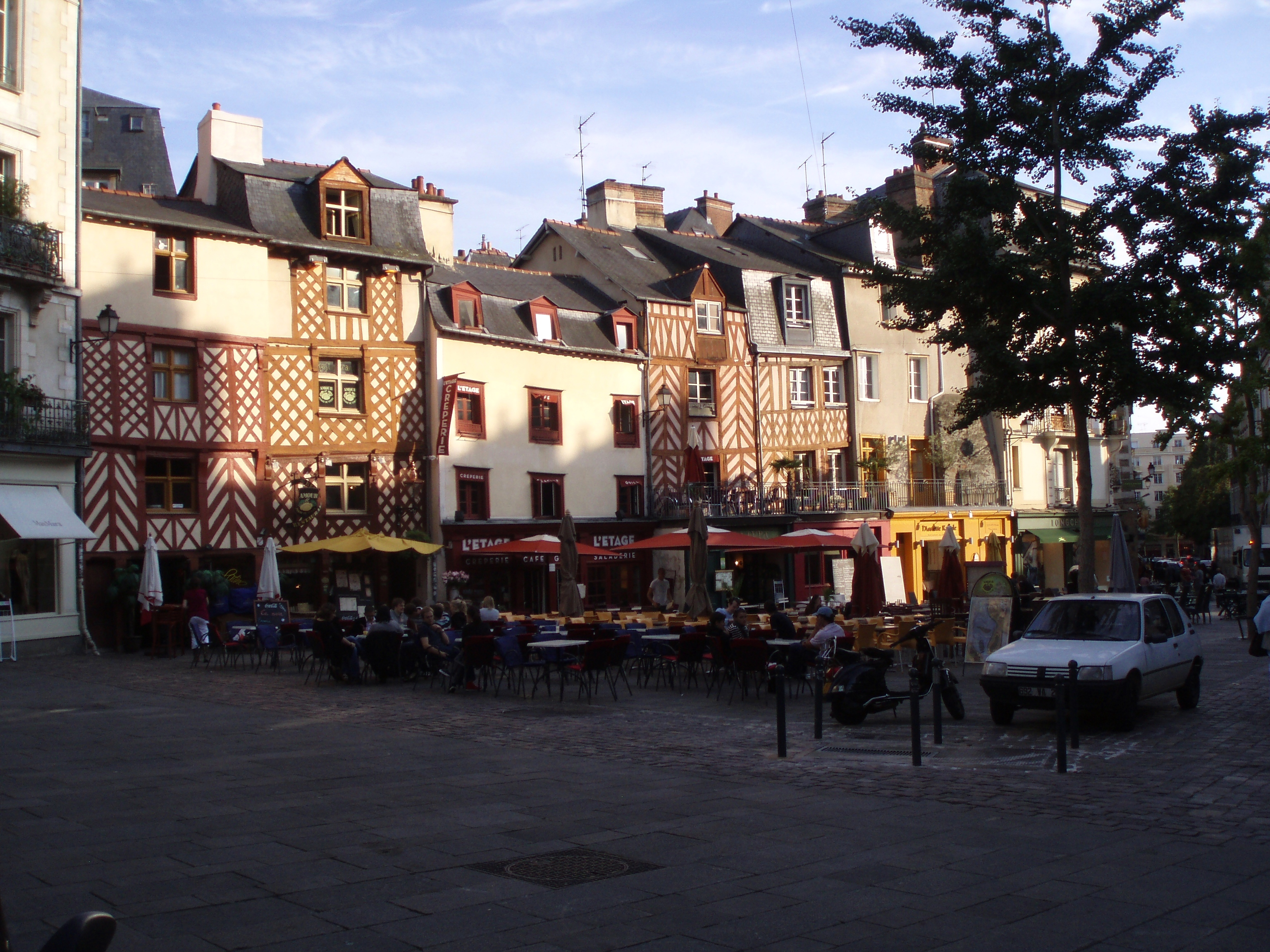
Place Rallier du Baty

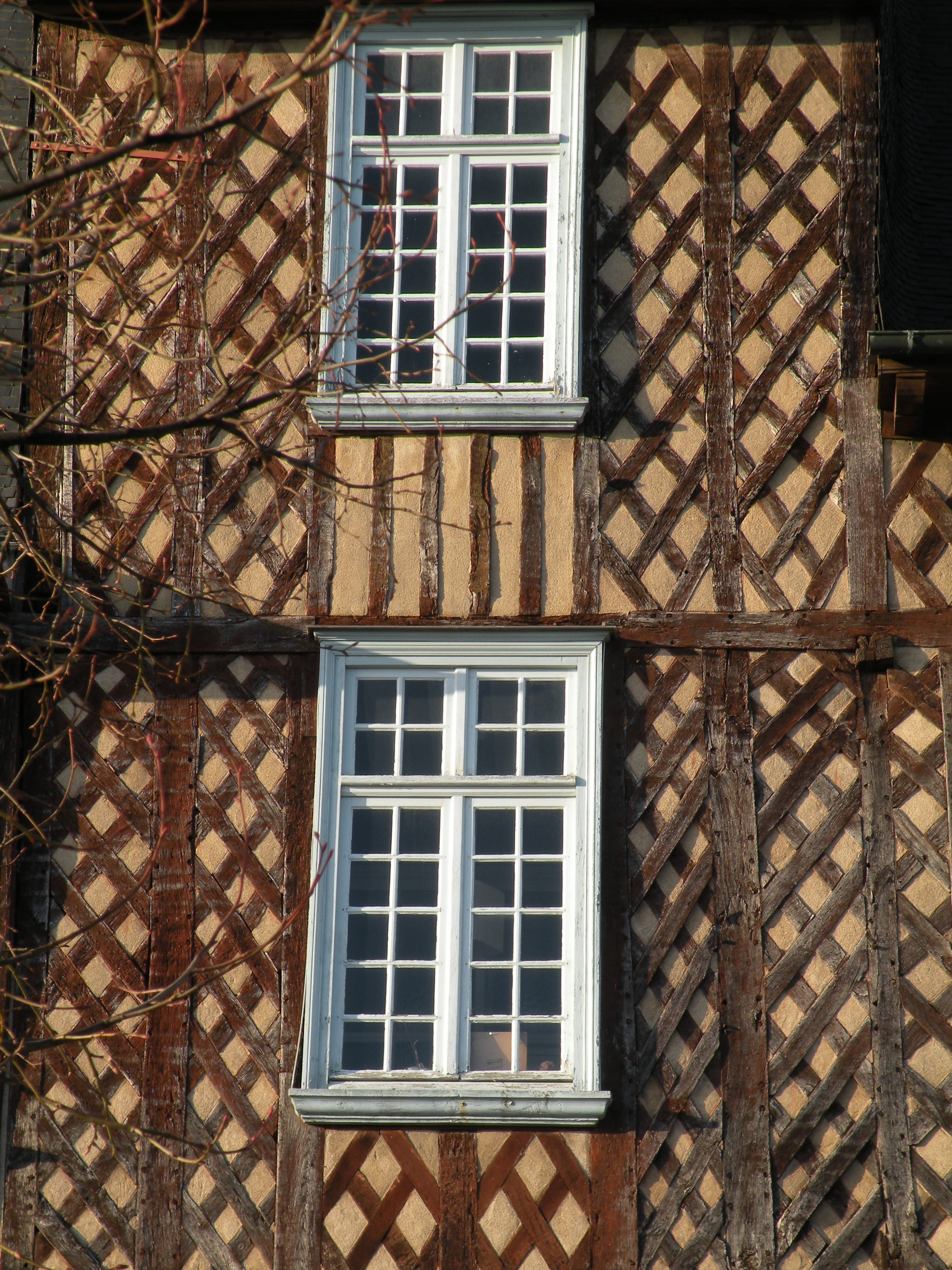
Windows of the Hôtel Racape de La Feuillée at Place des Lices

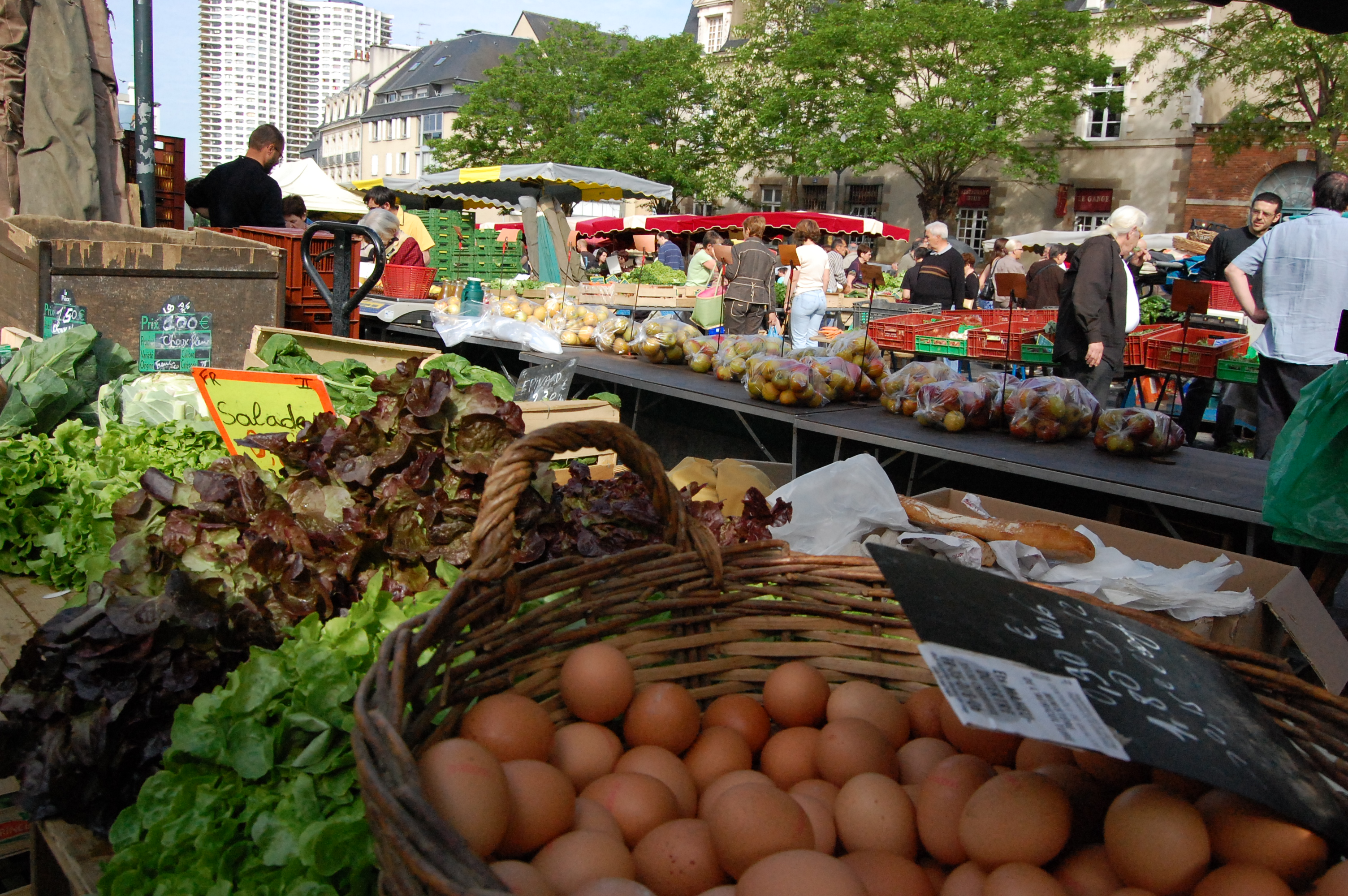
Marché des Lices, a weekly market for local producers at Place des Lices

== See also ==
- Communes of the Ille-et-Vilaine department
- List of works of the two Folgoët ateliers
- Attack of 7 August 1932 in Rennes
