= Ille-et-Vilaine's 3rd constituency =

Constituency of the National Assembly of France

3rd constituency of Ille-et-Vilaine
- inline Constituency of the National Assembly of France

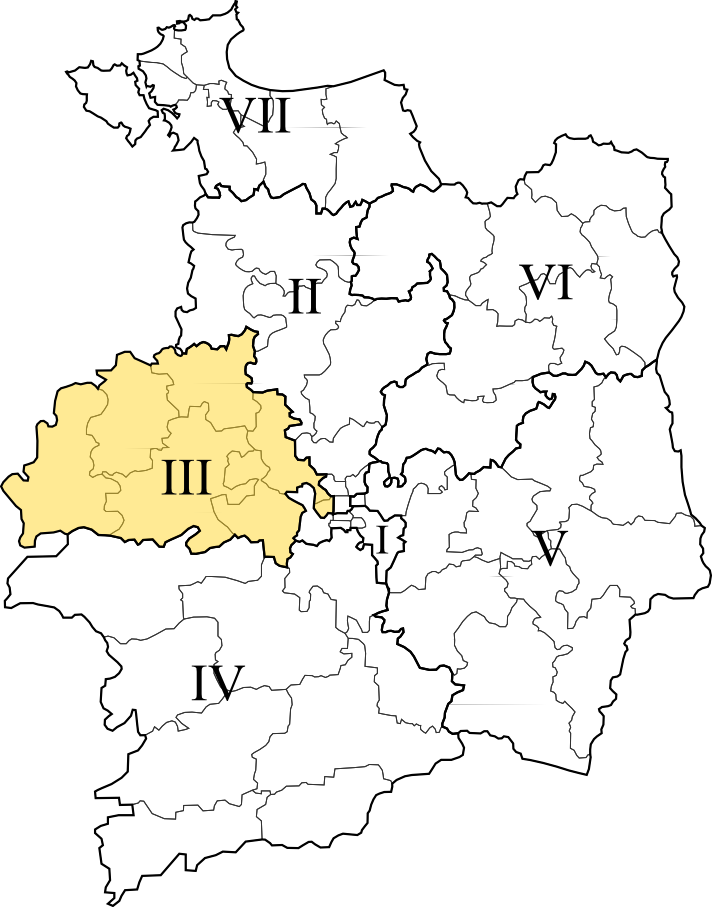
- Constituency in department

- Ille-et-Vilaine in France
- Deputy: Claudia Rouaux; PS
- Department: Ille-et-Vilaine
- Cantons: (pre-2015) Bécherel, Montauban-de-Bretagne, Montfort-sur-Meu, Mordelles, Rennes-Centre-Ouest, Rennes-Nord-Ouest, Saint-Méen-le-Grand

The 3rd constituency of Ille-et-Vilaine is a French legislative constituency in the Ille-et-Vilaine département. Like the other 576 French constituencies, it elects one MP using the two-round system, with a run-off if no candidate receives over 50% of the vote in the first round.

== 3rd constituency from 1958 until 1986 ==
=== Geographic description ===
Following the 1958 redistricting of French legislative constituencies, Ille-et-Vilaine's 3rd constituency was centered around the commune of Vitré. The department contained 6 constituencies at the time, and the constituency was composed of the following cantons:

- Canton of Argentré-du-Plessis
- Canton of Châteaubourg
- Canton of La Guerche-de-Bretagne
- Canton of Janzé
- Canton of Retiers
- Canton of Vitré-Est
- Canton of Vitré-Ouest

=== List of deputies between 1958 and 1986 ===
List of deputies from the Ille-et-Vilaine's 3rd constituency elected to the National Assembly for the 1st — 8th legislatures of the 5th Republic.
Legislature	Start of mandate	End of mandate	Deputy	Party	Notes
1st	9 December 1958	9 October 1962	Alexis Méhaignerie	MRP	Mandate shortened by the parliamentary dissolution decided by Charles de Gaulle.
2nd	6 December 1962	2 April 1967	Alexis Méhaignerie	MRP	
3rd	3 April 1967	30 May 1968	Alexis Méhaignerie	UDR	Mandate shortened by the parliamentary dissolution decided by Charles de Gaulle.
4th	11 July 1968	1 April 1973	Henri Lassourd	UDR	
5th	2 April 1973	12 February 1976	Pierre Méhaignerie	CDP	Replaced by Maurice Drouet (UC) on 13 February 1976 after his nomination to government.
5th	13 February 1976	2 April 1978	Maurice Drouet	CDP (UC)	Replaced by Maurice Drouet (UC) on 13 February 1976 after his nomination to government.
6th	3 April 1978	5 May 1978	Pierre Méhaignerie	UDF	Replaced by Maurice Drouet (UC) on 6 May 1978 after his nomination to the government. Mandate shortened by the parliamentary dissolution decided by François Mitterrand.
6th	6 May 1978	22 May 1981	Maurice Drouet	UDF	Replaced by Maurice Drouet (UC) on 6 May 1978 after his nomination to the government. Mandate shortened by the parliamentary dissolution decided by François Mitterrand.
7th	2 July 1981	1 April 1986	Pierre Méhaignerie	UDF	
8th	2 April 1986	14 May 1988	None	None	Proportional representation by department, no deputy elected for the 3rd constituency. Mandate shortened by the parliamentary dissolution decided by François Mitterrand.

== 3rd constituency from 1986 until 2010 ==
=== List of deputies between 1986 and 2010 ===
Election	Member	Party
1988	Yves Fréville	UDF
1997	Marcel Rogemont	PS
2002	Philippe Rouault	UMP
2007	Marcel Rogemont	PS diss.

=== Election results ===
==== 2007 ====
Legislative Election 2007: Ille-et-Vilaine's 3rd constituency
Party	Candidate	Votes	%	±%
UMP	Philippe Rouault	23,137	40.27	−2.73
DVG	Marcel Rogemont	14,292	24.87	N/A
PS	Laurence Duffaud	7,220	12.57	−25.64
MoDem	Jean-Paul Pincemin	5,129	8.93	N/A
LV	Nicole Biil-Nielsen	2,287	3.98	−0.07
LCR	Nicolas Beaujouan	1,449	2.52	+1.23
Others	N/A	3,947	-	−
Turnout		58,257	63.80	−2.22
2nd round result
DVG	Marcel Rogemont	30,050	52.75	N/A
UMP	Philippe Rouault	26,916	47.25	−3.54
Turnout		58,444	64.00	−1.26
DVG gain from UMP				

==== 2002 ====
Legislative Election 2002: Ille-et-Vilaine's 3rd constituency
Party	Candidate	Votes	%	±%
UMP	Philippe Rouault	23,524	43.00	N/A
PS	Marcel Rogemont	20,902	38.21	+4.78
FN	Marcel Colin	2,468	4.51	−2.82
LV	Jean-Luc Daubaire	2,218	4.05	−1.35
Others	N/A	5,593	-	−
Turnout		54,454	66.62	−0.89
2nd round result
UMP	Philippe Rouault	27,080	50.79	N/A
PS	Marcel Rogemont	26,242	49.21	−4.60
Turnout		54,454	65.26	−7.57
UMP gain from PS				

==== 1997 ====
Legislative Election 1997: Ille-et-Vilaine's 3rd constituency
Party	Candidate	Votes	%	±%
FD (UDF)	Gérard Pourchet	16,768	34.36	
PS	Marcel Rogemont	16,312	33.43	
FN	Brigitte Neveux	3,576	7.33	
PCF	Eric Berroche	2,789	5.72	
LV	Anaïg Hache	2,633	5.40	
LO	Jean-Pierre Gaudin	1,921	3.94	
GE	Anne Cadoret	1,411	2.89	
LDI	Agnès Hoube Delamaire	1,119	2.29	
Others	N/A	2,272	-	
Turnout		51,544	67.51	
2nd round result
PS	Marcel Rogemont	28,529	53.81	
FD (UDF)	Gérard Pourchet	24,493	46.19	
Turnout		55,605	72.83	
PS gain from FD				

==== 1993 ====
Legislative Election 1993: Ille-et-Vilaine 3rd - 2nd round
Party	Candidate	Votes	%	±%
UDF	Yves Fréville	28,492	60.05	
PS	Marcel Rogemont	18,956	39.95	
Turnout		50,387	66.15	
UDF hold		Swing		

== 3rd constituency since 2010 ==
=== Geographic description ===
Following the 2010 redistricting of French legislative constituencies, induced by ordinance n^{o} 2009-935 of 29 July 2009 and ratified by the French Parliament on 21 January 2010, Ille-et-Vilaine's 3rd constituency contains the following administrative divisions:

- Canton of Bécherel
- Canton of Combourg
- Canton of Montauban-de-Bretagne
- Canton of Montfort-sur-Meu
- Canton of Rennes-Nord-Ouest
- Canton of Saint-Méen-le-Grand
- Canton of Tinténiac.

=== List of deputies since 2010 ===
List of deputies from the Ille-et-Vilaine's 3rd constituency elected to the National Assembly for the 14th—15th legislatures of the 5th Republic.
Legislature	Start of mandate	End of mandate	Deputy	Party	Notes
14th	20 June 2012	20 June 2017	François André	PS	
15th	21 June 2017	11 February 2020	François André	LREM	Elected under the PS banner, André served in the LREM parliamentary group in 15th legislature. He died on 11 February 2020. He was replaced by his substitute, Claudia Rouaux of the Socialist Party.
15th	12 February 2020	21 June 2022	Claudia Rouaux	PS	Elected under the PS banner, André served in the LREM parliamentary group in 15th legislature. He died on 11 February 2020. He was replaced by his substitute, Claudia Rouaux of the Socialist Party.
16th	22 June 2022	incumbent	Claudia Rouaux	PS	

=== Election results ===
==== 2012 ====
The 2012 French legislative elections took place on 10 June 2012 and 17 June 2012, consecutive Sundays.

2012 legislative election in Ille-Et-Vilaine's 3rd constituency
Candidate	Party	First round		Second round	
Candidate	Party	Votes	%	Votes	%
François André	PS	22,075	45.24%	27,805	58.82%
Philippe Rouault	UMP	16,000	32.79%	19,466	41.18%
Nidia Boudier	FN	3,939	8.07%		
Yves Sauvage	EELV	2,610	5.35%		
Yannick Nadesan	FG	2,202	4.51%		
Gaylord Odic	DLR	693	1.42%		
Valérie Coussinet	UDB	443	0.91%		
Benoit Guillet	LO	292	0.60%		
Pia-Valentine Bailleul	NPA	228	0.47%		
Pierre Priet	POI	175	0.36%		
Gurwal Le Bris	SP	135	0.28%		
Gilles Helgen		2	0.00%		
Valid votes		48,794	98.31%	47,271	97.26%
Spoilt and null votes		840	1.69%	1,334	2.74%
Votes cast / turnout		49,634	60.91%	48,605	59.65%
Abstentions		31,857	39.09%	32,885	40.35%
Registered voters		81,491	100.00%	81,490	100.00%

==== 2017 ====
The 2017 French legislative elections took place on 11 June 2017 and 18 June 2017, consecutive Sundays.

2017 legislative election in Ille-Et-Vilaine's 3rd constituency
Candidate	Label	First round		Second round	
Candidate	Label	Votes	%	Votes	%
François André	PS	21,125	46.78	21,693	65.86
Mélina Parmentier	LR	6,832	15.13	11,244	34.14
Virginie Abautret	FI	6,102	13.51		
Justine Dieulafait	FN	4,605	10.20		
Gaëlle Rougier	ECO	2,823	6.25		
Yannick Nadesan	PCF	1,604	3.55		
Dylan Epinat	REG	534	1.18		
Mathieu Guihard	ECO	467	1.03		
Benoît Guillet	EXG	408	0.90		
Sophie Planté	EXG	331	0.73		
Luc Toupense	DIV	325	0.72		
Aloyse Jamin	DVD	4	0.01		
Votes		45,160	100.00	32,937	100.00
Valid votes		45,160	97.44	32,937	88.98
Blank votes		853	1.84	2,990	8.08
Null votes		332	0.72	1,088	2.94
Turnout		46,345	53.80	37,015	42.96
Abstentions		39,801	46.20	49,138	57.04
Registered voters		86,146		86,153	
Source: Ministry of the Interior

==== 2022 ====
Legislative Election 2022: Ille-et-Vilaine's 3rd constituency
Party	Candidate	Votes	%	±%
PS (NUPÉS)	Claudia Rouaux	16,822	35.72	-34.37
PRV (Ensemble)	Christophe Martins	15,317	32.53	N/A
RN	Astrid Prunier	6,998	14.86	+4.66
LR (UDC)	Mélina Parmentier	4,015	8.53	−6.60
REC	David Merliere	1,350	2.87	N/A
Others	N/A	2,588	5.50	
Turnout		47,090	52.45	−1.35
2nd round result
PS (NUPÉS)	Claudia Rouaux	23,784	51.53	-14.33
PRV (Ensemble)	Christophe Martins	22,375	48.47	N/A
Turnout		46,159	53.43	+10.47
PS hold				

=== 2024 ===
Candidate	Party	Alliance	First round			Second round		
Candidate	Party	Alliance	Votes	%	+/–	Votes	%	+/–
Claudia Rouaux	PS	NFP	24,649	36.77	+1.05	27,165	40.49	
Charlotte Faillé	HOR	Ensemble	19,919	29.71	-2.82	20,552	30.64	
Virginie D’Orsanne	RN		18,850	28.12	+13.26	19,366	28.87	
Victor Roulet	DVD		1,688	2.52	new			
Mathieu Guihard	REG		1,132	1.69	+0.43			
Jean-Louis Amisse	LO		802	1.20	-0.05			
Votes			67,040	100.00			100.00	
Valid votes			67,040	97.37	-0.40	67,083	97.79	
Blank votes			1,162	1.69	+0.10	1,083	1.58	
Null votes			646	0.94	+0.30	435	0.63	
Turnout			68,848	73.73	+21.28	68,601	73.45	
Abstentions			24,526	26.27	-21.28	24,792	26.55	
Registered voters			93,374			93,393		
Result			PS HOLD					
