= 2024 French legislative election in Ille-et-Vilaine =

Following the first round of the 2024 French legislative election on 30 June 2024, runoff elections in each constituency where no candidate received a vote share greater than 50 percent were scheduled for 7 July. Candidates permitted to stand in the runoff elections needed to either come in first or second place in the first round or achieve more than 12.5 percent of the votes of the entire electorate (as opposed to 12.5 percent of the vote share due to low turnout).

== Ille-et-Vilaine ==
=== 1st constituency ===
Candidate	Party or alliance		First round		Second round	
Candidate	Party or alliance		Votes	%	Votes	%
Marie Mesmeur	New Popular Front	La France Insoumise	28,467	42.31	30,190	45.66
Nicolas Boucher	Ensemble	Renaissance	21,453	31.88	24,181	36.57
Jeanne Rey du Boissieu	National Rally		11,878	17.65	11,754	17.78
Joëlle Le Gall	The Republicans		3,372	5.01		
Sébastien Girard	Breton Party		887	1.32		
Valérie Hamon	Far-left	Lutte Ouvrière	875	1.30		
Rosa Vasquez	Miscellaneous left	Independent	347	0.52		
Frédéric Mathieu	Miscellaneous left	La France Insoumise (Note: Dissident who ran without the backing of the New Popular Front)	8	0.01		
Total			67,287	100.00	66,125	100.00
Valid votes			67,287	97.75	66,125	97.57
Invalid votes			458	0.67	431	0.64
Blank votes			1,089	1.58	1,216	1.79
Total votes			68,834	100.00	67,772	100.00
Registered voters/turnout			94,338	72.97	94,366	71.82

=== 2nd constituency ===
Candidate	Party or alliance		First round		Second round	
Candidate	Party or alliance		Votes	%	Votes	%
Tristan Lahais	New Popular Front	Génération.s	30,361	40.31	32,489	43.65
Laurence Maillart-Méhaignerie	Ensemble	Renaissance	25,792	34.24	29,342	39.42
Bérénice Vanhaecke	National Rally		13,130	17.43	12,595	16.92
Christophe Decourcelle	The Republicans		5,218	6.93		
Florence Defrance	Far-left	Lutte Ouvrière	746	0.99		
Olivier Hanne	Ecologists	Independent	71	0.09		
Total			75,318	100.00	74,426	100.00
Valid votes			75,318	98.08	74,426	98.01
Invalid votes			450	0.59	403	0.53
Blank votes			1,022	1.33	1,111	1.46
Total votes			76,790	100.00	75,940	100.00
Registered voters/turnout			99,900	76.87	99,915	76.00

=== 3rd constituency ===
Candidate	Party or alliance		First round		Second round	
Candidate	Party or alliance		Votes	%	Votes	%
Claudia Rouaux	New Popular Front	Socialist Party	24,649	36.77	27,165	40.49
Charlotte Faillé	Ensemble	Horizons	19,919	29.71	20,552	30.64
Virginie d'Orsanne	National Rally		18,850	28.12	19,366	28.87
Victor Roulet	Miscellaneous right	Independent	1,688	2.52		
Mathieu Guihard	Breton Party		1,132	1.69		
Jean-Louis Amisse	Far-left	Lutte Ouvrière	802	1.20		
Total			67,040	100.00	67,083	100.00
Valid votes			67,040	97.37	67,083	97.79
Invalid votes			646	0.94	435	0.63
Blank votes			1,162	1.69	1,083	1.58
Total votes			68,848	100.00	68,601	100.00
Registered voters/turnout			93,374	73.73	93,393	73.45

=== 4th constituency ===
Candidate	Party or alliance		First round		Second round	
Candidate	Party or alliance		Votes	%	Votes	%
Jacques François	National Rally		22,275	32.30	26,671	42.43
Mathilde Hignet	New Popular Front	La France Insoumise	22,139	32.10	36,195	57.57
Anne Patault	Ensemble	Renaissance	16,595	24.06		
Jérémy Gilbert	The Republicans		6,103	8.85		
Sophie Hubert	Sovereigntist right	Debout la France	985	1.43		
Sandra Chirazi	Far-left	Lutte Ouvrière	868	1.26		
Total			68,965	100.00	62,866	100.00
Valid votes			68,965	97.23	62,866	89.50
Invalid votes			543	0.77	1,814	2.58
Blank votes			1,420	2.00	5,563	7.92
Total votes			70,928	100.00	70,243	100.00
Registered voters/turnout			97,688	72.61	97,711	71.89

=== 5th constituency ===
Candidate	Party or alliance		First round		Second round	
Candidate	Party or alliance		Votes	%	Votes	%
Christine Le Nabour	Ensemble	Renaissance	33,147	42.42	50,267	67.72
Françoise Gilois	National Rally		23,298	29.82	23,957	32.28
Gilles Renault	New Popular Front	La France Insoumise	20,199	25.85		
Christelle Jarny	Far-left	Lutte Ouvrière	1,494	1.91		
Total			78,138	100.00	74,224	100.00
Valid votes			78,138	96.57	74,224	94.32
Invalid votes			870	1.08	1,189	1.51
Blank votes			1,902	2.35	3,279	4.17
Total votes			80,910	100.00	78,692	100.00
Registered voters/turnout			111,588	72.51	111,620	70.50

=== 6th constituency ===
Candidate	Party or alliance		First round		Second round	
Candidate	Party or alliance		Votes	%	Votes	%
Thierry Benoit	Ensemble	Horizons	26,968	41.81	40,987	66.50
Tangi Marion	National Rally		19,960	30.94	20,652	33.50
Elsa Lafaye	New Popular Front	Communist Party	16,209	25.13		
Ludovic Hubert	Far-left	Lutte Ouvrière	839	1.30		
Pascal Thevenet	Miscellaneous centre	Résistons !	402	0.62		
Gilliatt de Staërck	Miscellaneous left	Independent	131	0.20		
Total			64,509	100.00	61,639	100.00
Valid votes			64,509	97.47	61,639	95.29
Invalid votes			536	0.81	888	1.37
Blank votes			1,141	1.72	2,162	3.34
Total votes			66,186	100.00	64,689	100.00
Registered voters/turnout			90,648	73.01	90,660	71.35

=== 7th constituency ===
Candidate	Party or alliance		First round		Second round	
Candidate	Party or alliance		Votes	%	Votes	%
Jean-Luc Bourgeaux	Miscellaneous right	The Republicans	32,549	43.33	50,315	69.50
Dylan Lemoine	National Rally		21,184	28.20	22,082	30.50
Nicolas Guivarc'h	New Popular Front	La France Insoumise	16,701	22.23		
Christophe Fichet	Miscellaneous centre	Miscellaneous right	3,665	4.88		
Edouard Descottes	Far-left	Lutte Ouvrière	1,015	1.35		
Total			75,114	100.00	72,397	100.00
Valid votes			75,114	98.00	72,397	95.79
Invalid votes			437	0.57	855	1.13
Blank votes			1,095	1.43	2,329	3.08
Total votes			76,646	100.00	75,581	100.00
Registered voters/turnout			106,649	71.87	106,644	70.87

=== 8th constituency ===
Candidate	Party or alliance		Votes	%
Mickaël Bouloux	New Popular Front	Socialist Party	36,029	52.84
Hermine Mauzé	Ensemble	Renaissance	17,517	25.69
Kellie Lucco	National Rally		9,820	14.40
Mahé Gargam	The Republicans		3,390	4.97
Maël Egron	Regionalists	Breton Party	768	1.13
Fabrice Lucas	Far-left	Lutte Ouvrière	654	0.96
Camille Champalaune	Ecologists	Independent	5	0.01
Total			68,183	100.00
Valid votes			68,183	98.45
Invalid votes			354	0.51
Blank votes			717	1.04
Total votes			69,254	100.00
Registered voters/turnout			91,957	75.31
