= Sustainable Development, Spatial and Regional Planning Committee =

Standing committee of the French National Assembly

The Sustainable Development, Spatial and Regional Planning Committee (French: Commission du Développement durable et de l'Aménagement du territoire) is one of the eight standing committees of the French National Assembly.

The committee was created on 1 July 2009 by the split of the former Economic Affairs, Environmental and Territory Committee due the increasingly important role of environmental issues.

== Organization ==
=== Powers ===
The powers of the committee, fixed by article 36, paragraph 14 of the Rules of the National Assembly are as follows:

- Territorial development.
- Transportation.
- Equipments.
- Infrastructure.
- Public Works.
- Environment.
- Hunting.

=== Committee composition ===
==== 13th legislature ====
During the 13th legislature of the French Fifth Republic, the committee was chaired by Christian Jacob, with Jérôme Bignon, Stéphane Demilly, Fabienne Labrette-Ménager, and Philippe Tourtelier as vice-presidents.

==== 14th legislature ====
From 28 June 2012 to 20 June 2017, the committee was chaired by Jean-Paul Chanteguet (PS).

Position	Name	Group	Constituency
President	Jean-Paul Chanteguet	SRC	Indre (1st)
Vice-president	Christophe Bouillon	SRC	Seine-Maritime (5th)
Vice-president	Catherine Quéré	SRC	Charente-Maritime (3rd)
Vice-president	François-Michel Lambert	ÉCOLO	Bouches-du-Rhône (10th)
Vice-president	Jean-Marie Sermier	UMP	Jura (3rd)
Secretary	Patrice Carvalho	GDR	Oise (6th)
Secretary	Stéphane Demilly	UDI	Somme (5th)
Secretary	Jacques Kossowski	UMP	Hauts-de-Seine (3rd)
Secretary	Jacques Krabal	RRDP	Aisne (5th)

==== 15th legislature ====
Position	Name	Group	Constituency
President	Barbara Pompili (until 15 July 2020)	REM	Somme (2nd)
President	Laurence Maillart-Méhaignerie (since 10 September 2020)	REM	Ille-et-Vilaine (2nd)
Vice-presidents	Guillaume Garot	NG	Mayenne (1st)
Vice-presidents	Adrien Morenas	REM	Vaucluse (3rd)
Vice-presidents	Jean-Marie Sermier	LR	Jura (3rd)
Secretaries	Sophie Auconie	UDI	Indre-et-Loire (3rd)
Secretaries	Jean-Luc Fugit	REM	Rhône (11th)
Secretaries	Stéphanie Kerbarh	REM	Seine-Maritime (9th)
Secretaries	Florence Lasserre	MoDem	Pyrénées-Atlantiques (5th)
