= Isabelle Le Callennec =

French politician (born 1966)

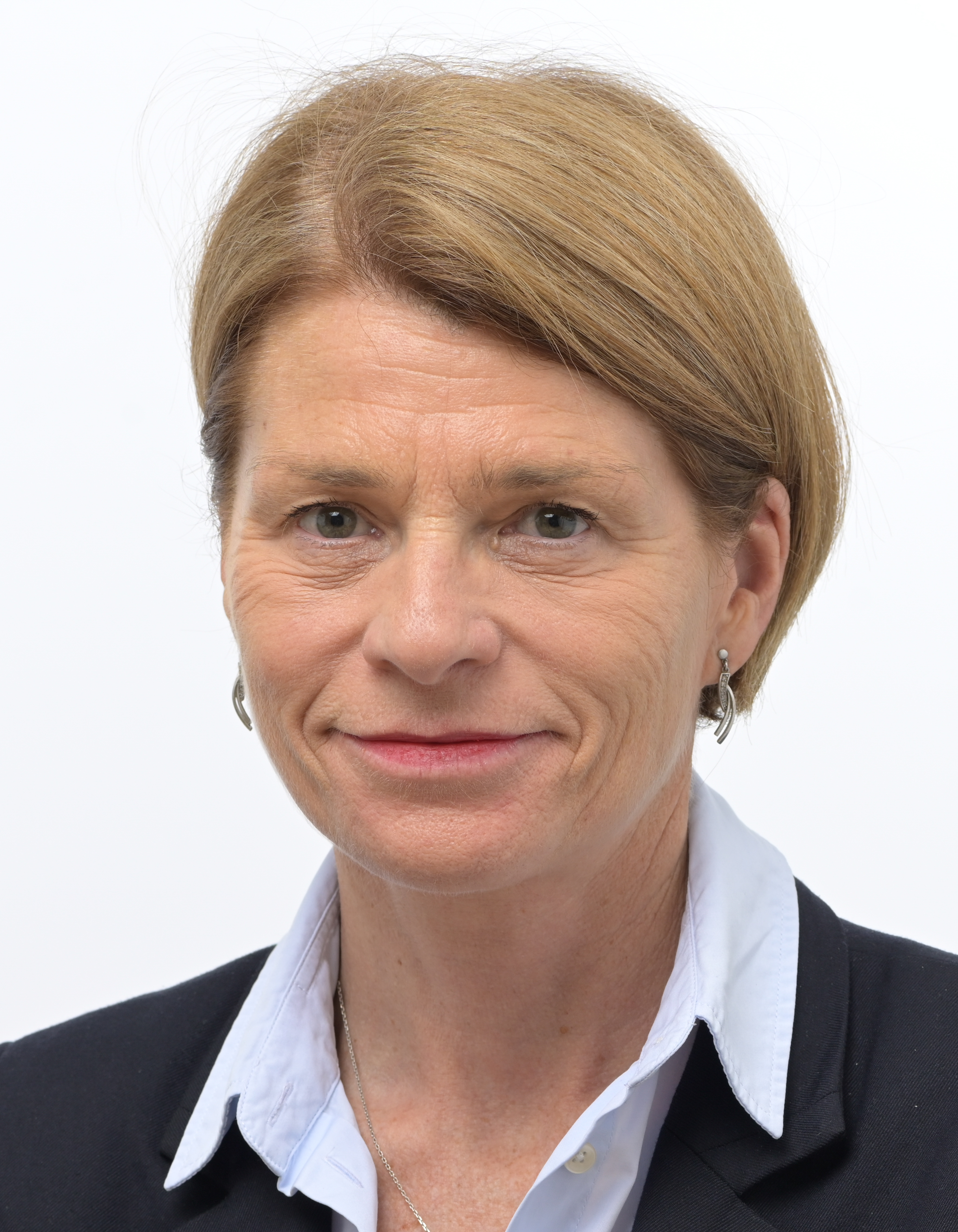
- Le Callennec in 2024

Member of the European Parliament
- Incumbent
- Assumed office 16 July 2024
- Constituency: France

Member of the National Assembly for Ille-et-Vilaine's 5th constituency
- In office 20 June 2012 – 20 June 2017
- Preceded by: Pierre Méhaignerie
- Succeeded by: Christine Cloarec

Mayor of Vitré
- In office 25 May 2020 – 3 July 2024
- Preceded by: Pierre Méhaignerie
- Succeeded by: Pierre Léonardi

Member of the Regional Council of Brittany
- Incumbent
- Assumed office 2 July 2021

Personal details
- Born: 14 October 1966 (age 59) Nantes, France
- Party: Union for French Democracy (until 2002); Union for a Popular Movement (2002–2015); The Republicans (2015–present)
- Education: École supérieure de commerce d'Amiens; CELSA Paris

Isabelle Le Callennec (French pronunciation: [izabɛl lə kalenɛk]; born 14 October 1966) is a French politician who has served as a Member of the European Parliament (MEP) since 2024. A member of The Republicans (LR), she previously represented the 5th constituency of Ille-et-Vilaine in the National Assembly from 2012 to 2017.

== Political career ==
=== Career in regional politics ===
Locally, Le Callennec was first a municipal councillor of Vitré (2008–2012) and a general councillor of Ille-et-Vilaine for the canton of Vitré-Est (2008–2015). When the General Council of Ille-et-Vilaine was renamed Departmental Council of Ille-et-Vilaine as part of the 2015 French cantonal reorganisation, she was elected for the newly created canton of Vitré for one term (until 2021). She later served as Mayor of Vitré from 2020 until her election as an MEP, presided over Vitré Communauté (2020–2024) and was elected to the Regional Council of Brittany in 2021.

In the 2016 The Republicans presidential primary, she supported François Fillon.

=== Member of the European Parliament, 2024–present ===
In the European Parliament, Le Callenec has been serving on the Committee on Regional Development and the Committee on Fisheries. In addition to her committee assignments, she is a member of the parliament's delegation to the EU-UK Parliamentary Partnership Assembly.

In the Republicans' 2025 leadership election, Le Callennec endorsed Laurent Wauquiez to succeed Éric Ciotti as the party's new chair and joined his campaign team.

== Political positions ==
As a deputy in 2013, Le Callennec opposed the legalisation of same-sex marriage in France. In 2014, she co-signed an amendment in the National Assembly proposing that abortion procedures no longer be reimbursed by Social security.
