= Tristan Lahais =

French politician (born 1983)

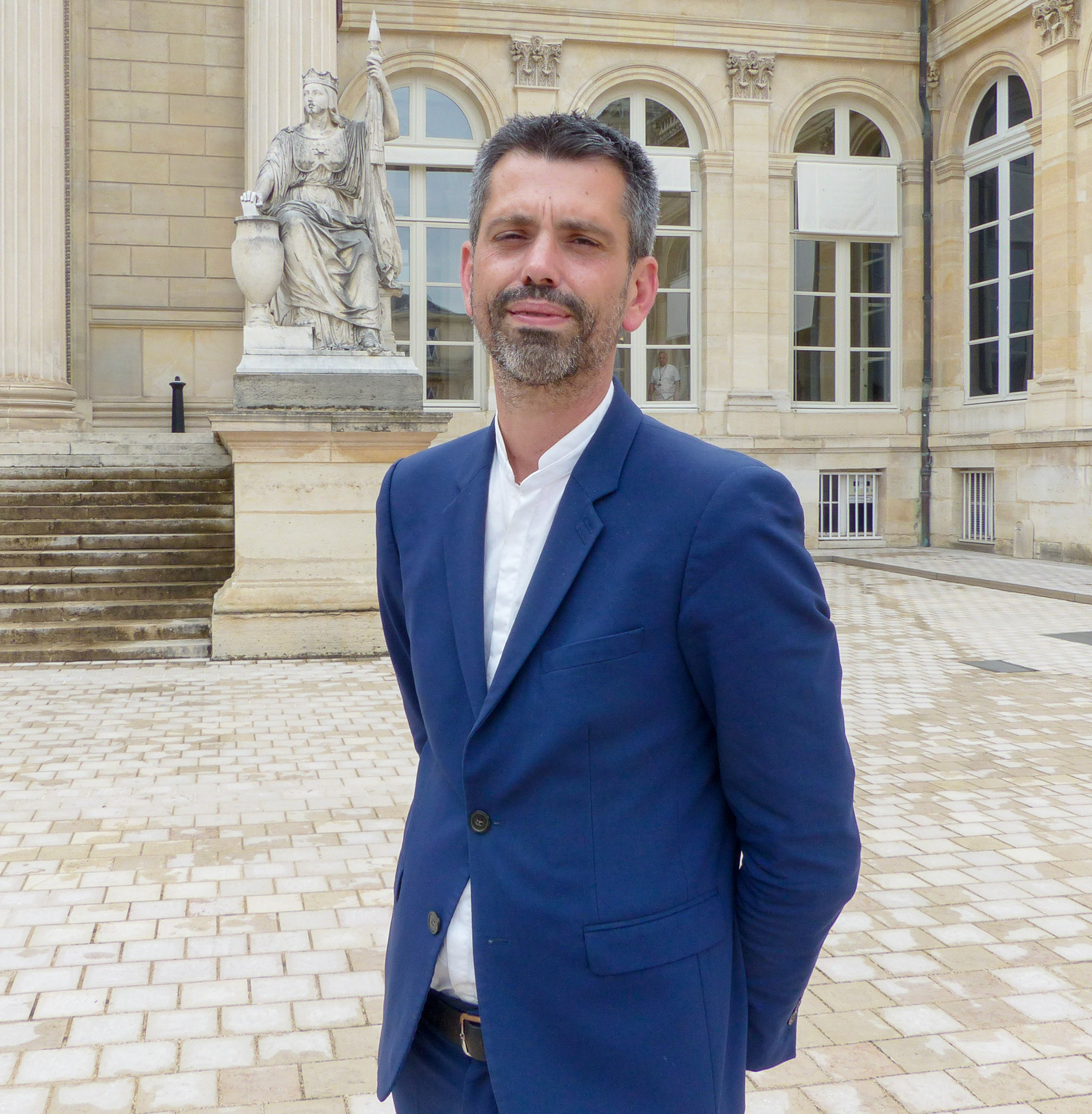

Member of the French National Assembly for Ille-et-Vilaine's 2nd constituency
- Incumbent
- Assumed office 18 July 2024
- Preceded by: Laurence Maillart-Méhaignerie

Personal details
- Born: 11 May 1983 (age 42)
- Party: Génération.s (since 2017)
- Other political affiliations: Socialist Party (2002–2017)

Tristan Lahais (born 11 May 1983) is a French politician of Génération.s who was elected member of the National Assembly for Ille-et-Vilaine's 2nd constituency in 2024. He has served as vice president of Rennes Métropole since 2020, and was a deputy mayor of Rennes under Nathalie Appéré.

== Early life and career ==
Lahais was born on 11 May 1983 and was raised in Rennes, where his father worked as a librarian and his mother was a secretary. He joined the Union Nationale des Étudiants de France and the Socialist Party as a student, after Jean-Marie Le Pen qualified for the second round of the 2002 presidential election.
