= Nathalie Appéré =

French politician (born 1975)

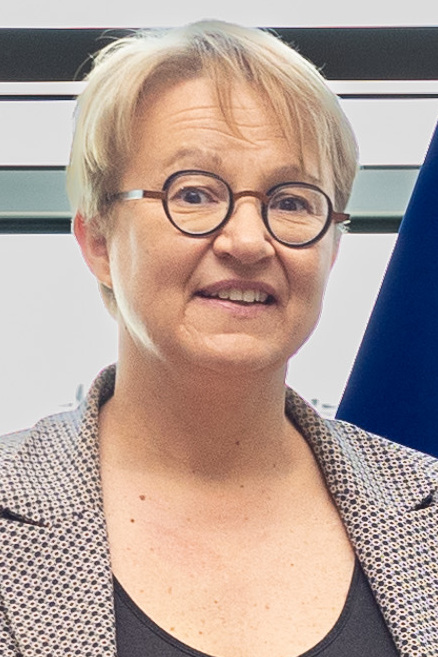
- Appéré in 2023

Mayor of Rennes
- Incumbent
- Assumed office 4 April 2014
- Preceded by: Daniel Delaveau

President of Rennes Métropole
- Incumbent
- Assumed office 9 July 2020
- Preceded by: Emmanuel Couet

Member of the National Assembly for Ille-et-Vilaine's 2nd constituency
- In office 20 June 2012 – 20 June 2017
- Preceded by: Philippe Tourtelier
- Succeeded by: Laurence Maillart-Méhaignerie

First Deputy Mayor of Rennes
- In office 22 March 2008 – 10 September 2012
- Preceded by: Pierrick Massiot
- Succeeded by: Gaëlle Andro

Personal details
- Born: 8 July 1975 (age 51) Ploemeur, France
- Party: Socialist Party
- Children: 2
- Education: Sciences Po Rennes

Nathalie Appéré (French pronunciation: [natali apeʁe]; born 8 July 1975) is a French politician who has served as the president of Rennes Métropole since 2020 and the mayor of Rennes since 2014. She is a member of the Socialist Party (PS).

Appéré was born in Morbihan and moved to Rennes in 1993 to study at Sciences Po Rennes. She graduated three years later and entered the public service. In 1995, Appéré joined the Young Socialist Movement (MJS) in 1995 and then the Socialist Party. She was named by Edmond Hervé to his electoral list in the 2001 French municipal elections, after which she was appointed his deputy for community living. Appéré then managed Daniel Delaveau's successful mayoral campaign in 2008, with Delaveau subsequently appointing her deputy mayor, in charge of Solidarity, as well as vice-president of Rennes Métropole, in charge of Social Cohesion.

Appéré was elected to the National Assembly in the 2012 French legislative elections, representing Ille-et-Vilaine's 2nd constituency. She then became the first female mayor of Rennes in 2014 and was re-elected in 2020, when she also won the presidency of Rennes Métropole.

== Early life and education ==
Nathalie Appéré was born on 8 July 1975 in Ploemeur, Morbihan.

Appéré moved to Rennes in 1993 after obtaining her baccalauréat. She enrolled in Sciences Po Rennes and graduated in 1996, writing a senior thesis titled "Study for a Diagnostic and the Definition of a Research Strategy in the Rennes Agglomeration: Final Report Relating to the Study Contract with the City of Rennes–University of Rennes 1" with Jacques Hardy as her advisor. Appéré then became a lecturer in public law.

Appéré's professional career centred around city politics and urban social development. She first entered the public service as a research analyst for the Regional Institute of Social Work in Rennes from 1996 to 1998, after which she took up the post of director of public infrastructure for Saint-Jacques-de-la-Lande from 2000 to 2008.

== Political career ==
After arriving in Rennes, Appéré joined the Young Socialist Movement at the age of 20 during the 1995 French presidential election. She became a member of the Socialist Party (PS) and took up several departmental posts within the party, notably that of spokesperson for the Socialist federation of Ille-et-Vilaine.

Appéré joined Edmond Hervé's electoral list for Rennes in the 2001 municipal elections, after which she was appointed deputy mayor for community living. It was in this position that she led major city projects such as the reform of the Rennes Social and Cultural Office.

=== Rise to prominence ===
Appéré was the director of Daniel Delaveau's successful campaign for mayor of Rennes in the 2008 municipal elections, after which she was appointed first deputy mayor, in charge of Solidarity, and vice-president of Rennes Métropole, in charge of Social Cohesion. Among her initiatives were the implementation of the "Sortir" tourism card, providing discounts for visitors to cultural and entertainment attractions in Rennes, as well as the rehabilitation of the city's heritage district.

Appéré also served as the president of the supervisory board of Guillaume-Régnier hospital from 2010 to 2012. In early 2012, she supported a strike at the hospital protesting the facility's insufficient patient capacity.

At the national level, Appéré was named vice-president of the National Council of Cities in 2010. The body is presided over by the Prime Minister of France and discusses issues surrounding municipal politics, neighbourhood public policy and territorial difficulties.

Appéré endorsed François Hollande in the PS' 2011 open presidential primary.

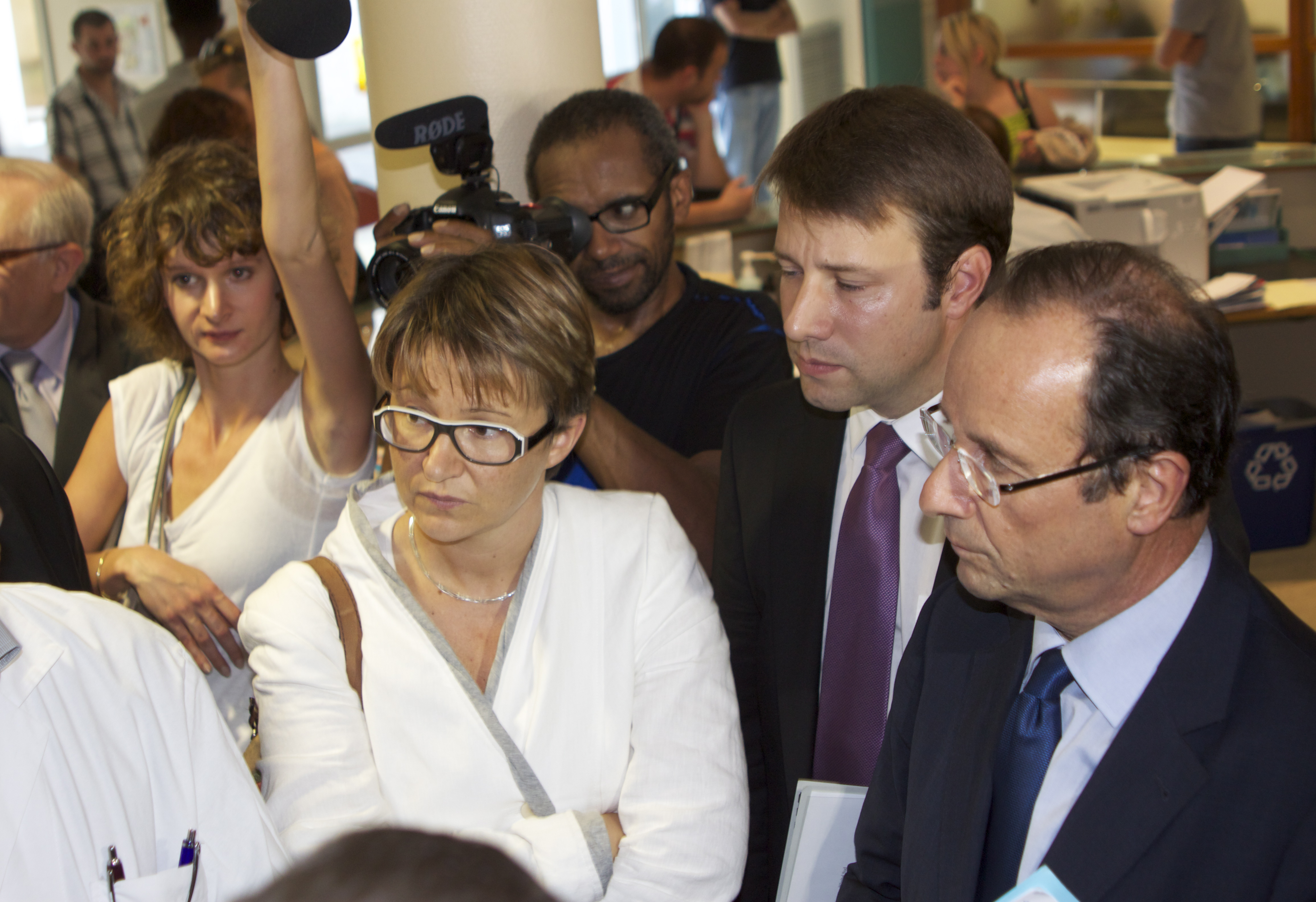
Appéré and then-presidential candidate François Hollande in Rennes, September 2011

=== Member of the National Assembly ===
During the 2002 French legislative elections, Appéré was elected as the designated substitute of Philippe Tourtelier, Socialist deputy for Ille-et-Vilaine's 2nd constituency. After Tourtelier announced that he would not run for a third term in the 2012 legislative elections, Appéré was nominated by the PS in his riding. Speaking after receiving the nomination, she promised party activists that she would resign her executive offices in Rennes but also signalled that she would continue to sit on the city's municipal council. Appéré was elected to the National Assembly on 17 June 2012, winning 63.45% of the vote in the second round against Bertrand Plouvier of the Union for a Popular Movement (UMP).

In December 2012, she declared her candidacy for the Socialist nomination for mayor of Rennes in the 2014 French municipal elections. Although Appéré had previously stated her opposition to the law on the accumulation of electoral mandates several times, she ultimately announced that she would serve out her full term as deputy if she were to be elected to the mayoralty.

=== Mayor of Rennes ===
==== First term ====
Appéré was elected mayor of Rennes on 4 April 2014 with 55.83% of the vote in the second round after forming an alliance with the Europe Ecology – The Greens–Left Front electoral list. She thus became the city's first female mayor.

The beginning of Appéré's term was marked by several violent protests against the Grand Ouest Airport project in January 2016 as well as the El Khomri law between March and May of the same year. She responded by demanding a "clear decision from the French state" on the airport. Further riots broke out after the announcement of the El Khomri law, with a 20-year-old student notably losing an eye in the violence on 28 April. This led student protesters to interrupt a session of the Rennes municipal council on 2 May, calling for the mayor to put an end to police brutality.

In 2016, Appéré endorsed Manuel Valls in the 2017 Socialist presidential primary and joined his campaign's organizational staff. Valls was defeated in the primary by Benoît Hamon, whom Appéré subsequently endorsed in the presidential election.

In accordance with the law on the accumulation of electoral mandates, Appéré did not seek re-election in the 2017 French legislative elections. In 2018, she supported Olivier Faure for first secretary of the PS during its Aubervilliers Congress. Appéré was appointed to the party's national bureau on 15 April of that year.

On 12 February 2019, the City Mayors Foundation awarded Appéré a World Mayor Commendation, along with Mayor Ros Jones of Doncaster, Mayor Charlotte Britz of Saarbrücken and Mayor Beng Climaco of Zamboanga City. The foundation announced that she had received the distinction for her housing policies, establishment of a participatory budget system and overseeing of demographic and economic development.

Appéré's first term also saw the opening of the LGV Bretagne-Pays de la Loire high-speed railway in July 2017, the Convent of the Jacobins Convention Centre in January 2018 and the renovated Rennes station in July 2019. Other infrastructure projects included two new public parks—the Saint-Martin Meadows and Baud Beaches.

==== 2020 Rennes municipal election campaign ====
===== Pre-election manoeuvres =====
On 26 June 2019, Appéré launched a discussion platform named "200 Days for Rennes" in the lead-up to the 2020 French municipal elections. The platform had a website with the address "avecnathalieappere.fr" ("With Nathalie Appéré"). In an interview with Ouest-France on 13 September, she confirmed that she would be a candidate in the upcoming municipal elections but would begin her campaign later than her competitors, citing her ongoing consideration of whether to run for the presidency of Rennes Métropole following the expected retirement of Socialist incumbent Emmanuel Couet. She received the endorsement of deputy François André, an independent affiliated with the La République En Marche group, four days later. Nevertheless, La République En Marche itself announced that it would be running its own electoral list in the elections.

===== Campaign and policy platform =====
Appéré announced her candidacy for the mayoralty of Rennes and the presidency of Rennes Métropole on 10 December 2019, during an 800-person event at Rennes' Le Liberté performance hall concluding the 200 Days for Rennes campaign. The latter ended after collecting the views of 1 000 Rennais, according to its organizers. Appéré was joined by representatives from the French Communist Party, the Radical Party of the Left, Génération.s and Place Publique who declared their parties' support for her campaign. The event also saw her announce the first planks of her platform, such as the creation of five rapid transit bus lines, which she called "trambuses," the laying out of 100 kilometres of safe bicycle lanes, the adoption of free public transit for riders under 12 years old, the planting of 30 000 trees in six years, the uncovering of the Vilaine river in front of the Palace of Commerce as well as the establishment of a nighttime municipal police department and a police brigade combating anti-social behaviour.

The following month, Appéré had the City of Rennes acquire the Jacques Cartier Prison with plans of converting it into a cultural attraction. She also announced the construction of an aquatic centre that would replace a public pool in the neighbourhood of Villejean. Appéré released her full platform on 7 February 2020, which included commitments to create citizens' panels for urban redevelopment projects and the redefinition of certain municipal policies, build a "Neighbourhood of Creation" for "cultural and creative industries" next to the city's SNCF station and never increase local taxes. On 21 February, she confirmed her candidacy for president of Rennes Métropole and joined 25 other electoral list leaders and 12 incumbent mayors in unveiling a metropolitan platform.

On 5 March, Appéré held a rally in advance of the first round of the elections that attracted 800 people. The following day, she received the public endorsement of former mayor Edmond Hervé, under whom she had served as deputy mayor from 2001 to 2008.

===== Re-election victory =====
The first round of the election on 15 March 2020 was marked by the rapidly worsening COVID-19 pandemic. Appéré's list won 32.77% of the vote, putting it in first place ahead of the lists of Matthieu Theurier and Europe Ecology – The Greens (EELV), Carole Gandon and La République En Marche (LREM) and Charles Compagnon and the Miscellaneous right (DVG). Due to the COVID-19 lockdown in France, the second round was postponed to 28 June. It was during this delay that Appéré announced on 30 May that she had successfully concluded an electoral pact with the EELV to unite their lists in the second round against those of Gandon and Compagnon.

Appéré's list won the second round with 65.35% of the vote, though voter turnout fell to a historic low of 68.33% of the electorate. Consequently, her result was ten percentage points higher than in 2014 but consisted of almost 9 000 fewer votes. She also finished far ahead of Gandon and Compagnon's lists, which recorded 17.49% and 17.15% of the vote respectively. Responding to the results, Appéré praised the "clear, definite and massive choice of Rennais" and welcomed the "large victory with pride and emotion," while also promising to "work to reinforce local democracy" to remedy low voter turnout. She additionally described Rennes as "the vanguard of a social and environmentalist left."

==== Second term ====
During the first session of the new municipal council on 3 July, Appéré was re-elected mayor with 51 votes against 10 blank votes and one invalid vote for Hervé cast by an opposition councillor. Speaking after assuming office, Appéré spoke of the great "emotion [she was feeling] at this moment" and paid homage to her predecessors. She then appointed 21 deputy mayors, including 12 candidates from her municipal election list and nine from Theurier's EELV list. Several of the latter received important portfolios like Education, Culture and Finance. Also among the nominees was the son of Edmond Hervé, Marc Hervé, whom Appéré promoted from seventh deputy mayor, in charge of Finance, to first deputy mayor, in charge of Urban Planning.

=== President of Rennes Métropole ===
Appéré stood for the presidency of Rennes Métropole during the inaugural session of its communal council on 9 July 2020. She was the sole candidate and was elected with 78 votes out of 111 councillors present. This was followed by the new president's nomination of an executive cabinet consisting of 20 vice-presidents, 12 of which were not from Rennes (one more than in the previous government). A group of 11 mayors then announced that they would form an "independent" group, though without leaving the opposition benches.

On 24 September, Appéré was named secretary-general of France Urbaine, an association of elected officials from urban municipalities across France. She succeeded the former mayor of Nancy, André Rossinot, in this position. Six months later, she established the "Idées en Commun" discussion platform (originally proposed by Mayor Anne Hidalgo of Paris), to address housing issues. Appéré then joined Hidalgo on 12 September 2021 for an event launching the Paris mayor's campaign in the 2022 French presidential election.

== Personal life ==
Appéré is married and has 2 children. She lives in Rennes and has previously resided in its Maurepas-Patton neighbourhood.
