= Pierre Méhaignerie =

French politician (born 1939)

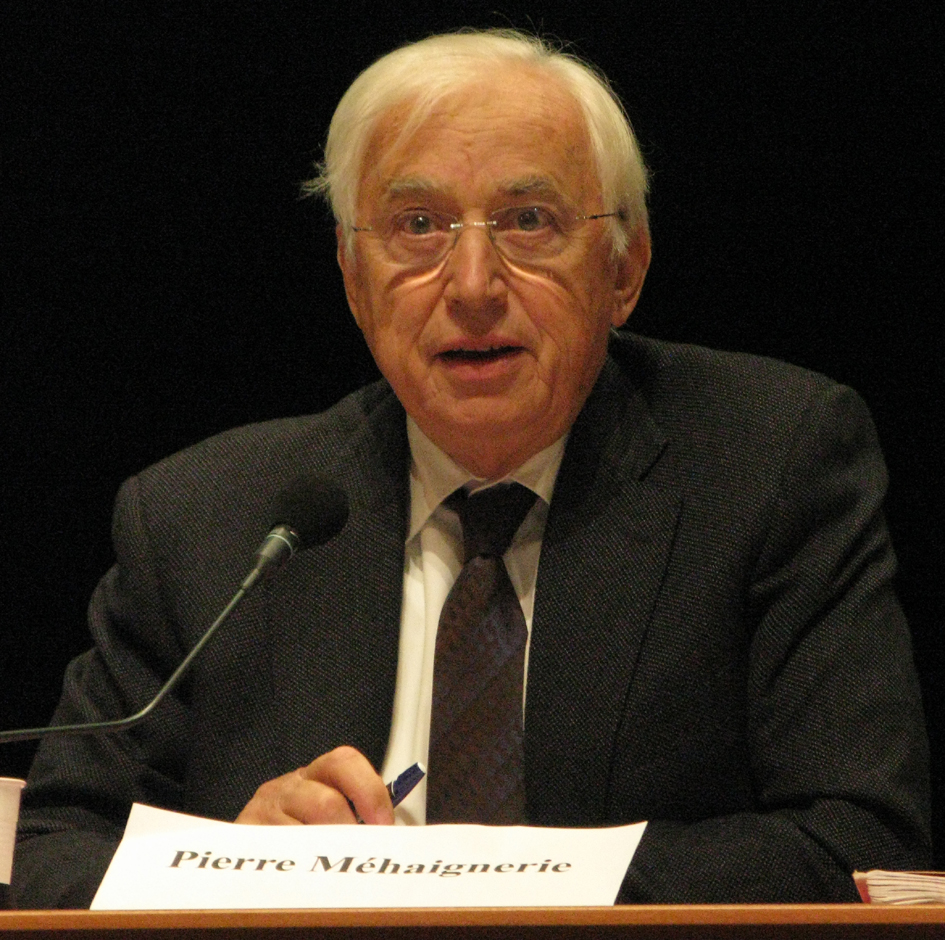
- Pierre Méhaignerie in 2011

Mayor of Vitré
- In office 25 March 1977 – 25 May 2020
- Preceded by: René Crinon
- Succeeded by: Isabelle Le Callennec

Minister of Justice
- In office 30 March 1993 – 11 May 1995
- President: François Mitterrand
- Prime Minister: Édouard Balladur
- Preceded by: Michel Vauzelle
- Succeeded by: Jacques Toubon

Deputy of Ille-et-Vilaine's 5th constituency
- In office 1995–2012
- Preceded by: Danielle Dufeu
- Succeeded by: Isabelle Le Callennec

Personal details
- Born: 4 May 1939 (age 86) Balazé, France
- Party: UDI
- Spouse: Julie Harding (m. 1965)
- Children: 2

Pierre Méhaignerie (born 4 May 1939) is a French politician. He is a former deputy of the Ille-et-Vilaine's 5th constituency and the former mayor of Vitré (re-elected in March 2008).

== Career ==
He was elected in 1973 to the French parliament in the Ille-et-Vilaine's 3rd constituency and became mayor of Vitré in 1977. He was Minister of Agriculture from 1977 to 1981 and Minister of Justice from 1993 to 1995. A former member of the UDF political party, he was general secretary of the right-wing UMP from 2004 to 2007.

Political offices
Preceded by Michel Vauzelle	Minister of Justice; 1993–1995	Succeeded by Jacques Toubon
