= Florian Bachelier =

French politician

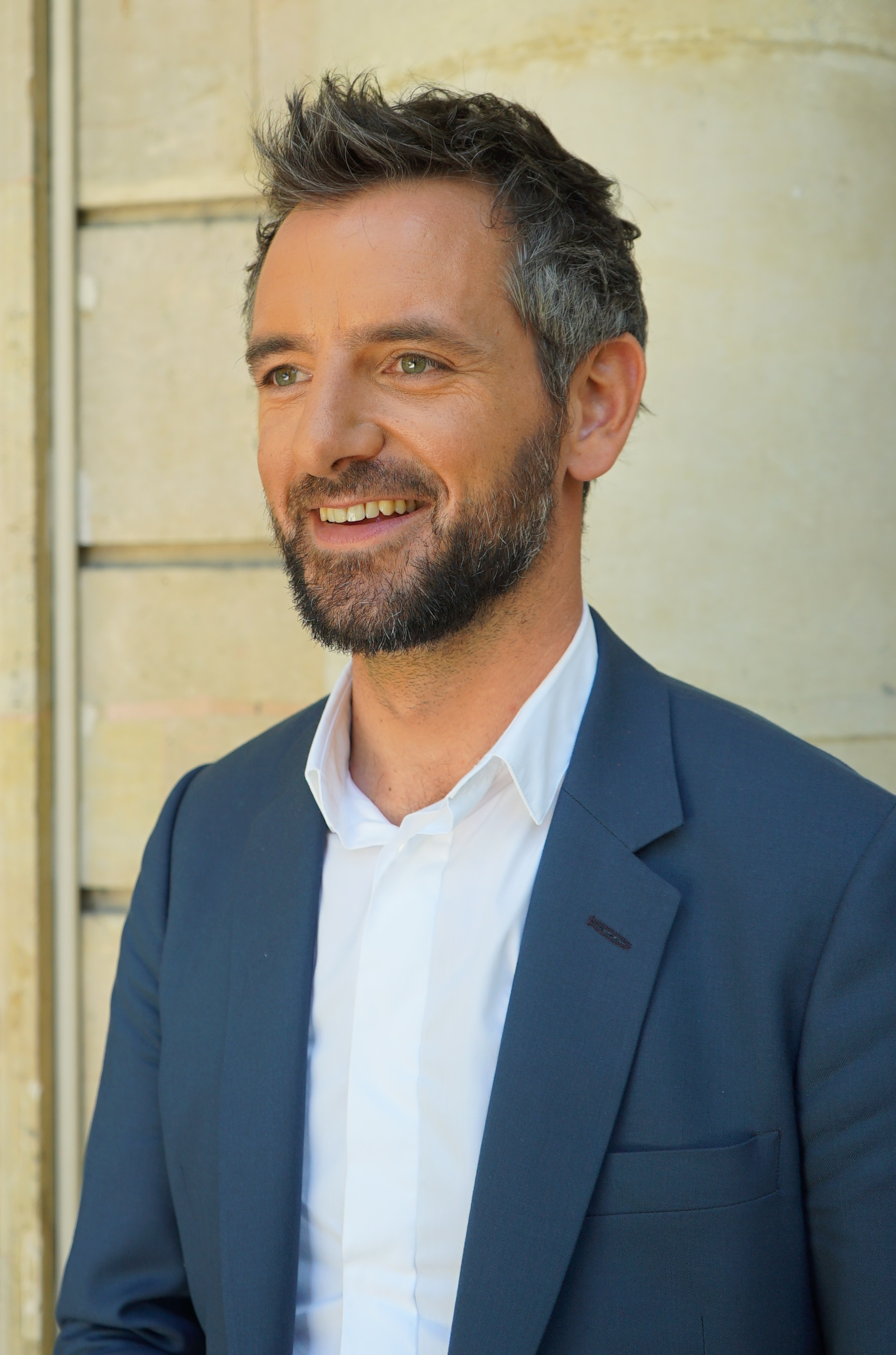

Member of the National Assembly for Ille-et-Vilaine's 8th constituency
- In office 21 June 2017 – 22 June 2022
- Preceded by: Marcel Rogemont
- Succeeded by: Mickaël Bouloux

Personal details
- Born: 5 April 1979 (age 47) Thionville, France
- Party: La République En Marche!
- Education: University of Rennes 1
- Profession: Lawyer

Florian Bachelier (born 5 April 1979) is a French lawyer and politician of La République En Marche! (LREM) who was a deputy in the French National Assembly, representing the department of Ille-et-Vilaine from 2017 to 2022.

== Early life and education ==
Born in Thionville as the son of a vocational high school teacher and a nursery assistant, Bachelier studied law at the University of Rennes while working as a pizza deliveryman, waiter, and receptionist for Gaumont as side jobs.

== Political career ==
Bachelier joined the Socialist Party in the early 2000s before joining En Marche! during its founding in 2016.

In parliament, Bachelier has been serving as quaestor and therefore part of the bureau of the Nation Assembly of the 15th legislature of the French Fifth Republic since 2017; he was confirmed in that role again in 2019.

In his position as quaestor, he is jointly responsible with two other deputies for the administration and control of the expenses of the assembly. The newspaper Le Monde notes that while he has constantly communicated on his good management of the funds he was in charge of, claiming loudly to have made substantial savings, an examination of the figures shows that expenses have increased compared to the previous mandate.
