= Philippe Tourtelier =

French politician

Member of the National Assembly for Ille-et-Vilaine's 2nd constituency
- In office 19 June 2002 – 19 June 2012
- Preceded by: Edmond Hervé
- Succeeded by: Nathalie Appéré

Personal details
- Born: 29 July 1948 (age 77) Saffré, Loire-Atlantique, France
- Party: Socialist Party
- Profession: Teacher

Philippe Tourtelier (born July 29, 1948 in Saffré) was a member of the National Assembly of France. He represented Ille-et-Vilaine's 2nd constituency from 2002 to 2012 as a member of the Socialiste, radical, citoyen et divers gauche.
