= Henri Fréville =

French politician, Mayor of Rennes

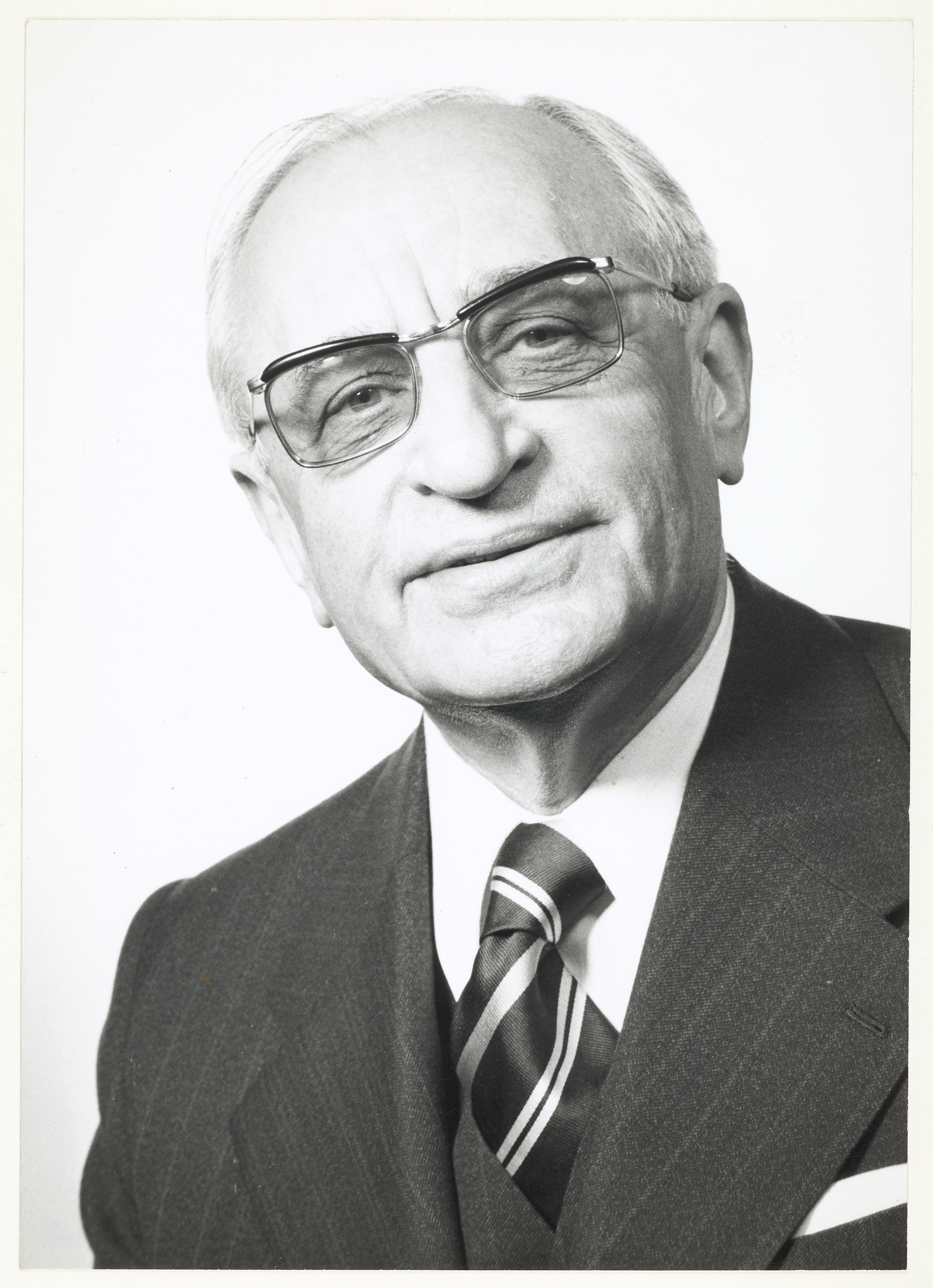

Mayor of Rennes
- In office 1953–1977
- Preceded by: Yves Milon
- Succeeded by: Edmond Hervé

Member of National Assembly
- In office 1958–1968

Member of French Senate for Ille-et-Vilaine
- In office 1971–1980

President of the General council of Ille-et-Vilaine
- In office 1966–1976
- Preceded by: Robert de Toulouse-Lautrec
- Succeeded by: François Le Douarec

Personal details
- Born: 4 December 1905 Norrent-Fontes, France
- Died: 15 June 1987 (aged 81) Rennes, France
- Party: RPCD (1958–1962); CD (1962–1967); PDM (1967–1968); UCDP (1971–1980)

Henri Fréville (French pronunciation: [ɑ̃ʁi fʁevil]; 4 December 1905, in Norrent-Fontes, Pas-de-Calais – 15 June 1987, in Rennes, Ille-et-Vilaine) was a French history professor, writer, politician and French Resistance member.

== Life ==
He was history professor at the lycée Chateaubriand at Rennes from 1932 and from 1949 to 1971 taught modern history at the Faculty of Letters at Rennes, which became the Université Rennes II. He was one of the founders of the Institut armoricain de recherches historiques.

On the Liberation, he was director of the cabinet of Victor Le Gorgeu, Commissaire régional de la République for the four Breton départements.

He was mayor (MRP) of Rennes from 1953 to 1977, president of the conseil général d'Ille-et-Vilaine from 1966 to 1976, député of the 1st constituency of Ille-et-Vilaine from 1958 to 1968, senator for Ille-et-Vilaine from 1970 to 1977. He was the target of an FLB attack on 26 August 1975.

Author of several works of history, he notably studied the behaviour of Breton nationalists during the Second World War through documents of the German military administration, recovered from the surroundings of the hôtel Majestic.

== Honours ==
On 10 May 1993, Rennes renamed its avenue de Crimée the avenue Henri-Fréville after him, and a Metro station in the town (line A) is also named after him.

== Publications ==
- L'Intendance de Bretagne (1689–1790). Essai sur l'histoire d'une intendance en Pays d'États au XVIIIe, I/III. Thesis. Rennes, Plihon, 1953. 3 vol.
- Un acte de foi : trente ans au service de la Cité; Rennes : Éditions SEPES, 1977. OCLC 5616817
- La presse bretonne dans la tourmente : 1940–1946, Plon, Paris, 1979
- Archives secrètes de Bretagne, 1940–1944, Ouest-France, Rennes, 1985 (reedited 2004 and 2008, reviewed and corrected by Françoise Morvan), ISBN 978-2-7373-4453-4 (2008 ed.).

== Bibliography ==
- Youenn Didro; Yann Fouéré (1981). L'histoire du quotidien "La Bretagne" et les silences d'Henri Fréville (in French). Cahiers de l'Avenir de la Bretagne. OCLC 10019600.
- Fréville, Henri (1978). Un acte de foi : trente ans au service de la cité. Rennes: Éditions Sepes. p. 965.

== Notes and references ==
Political offices
Preceded by Robert de Toulouse-Lautrec	President of the General council of Ille-et-Vilaine; 1966–1976	Succeeded by François Le Douarec
Preceded by Yves Milon	Mayor of Rennes; 1953–1977	Succeeded by Edmond Hervé
