= Daniel Delaveau =

French politician

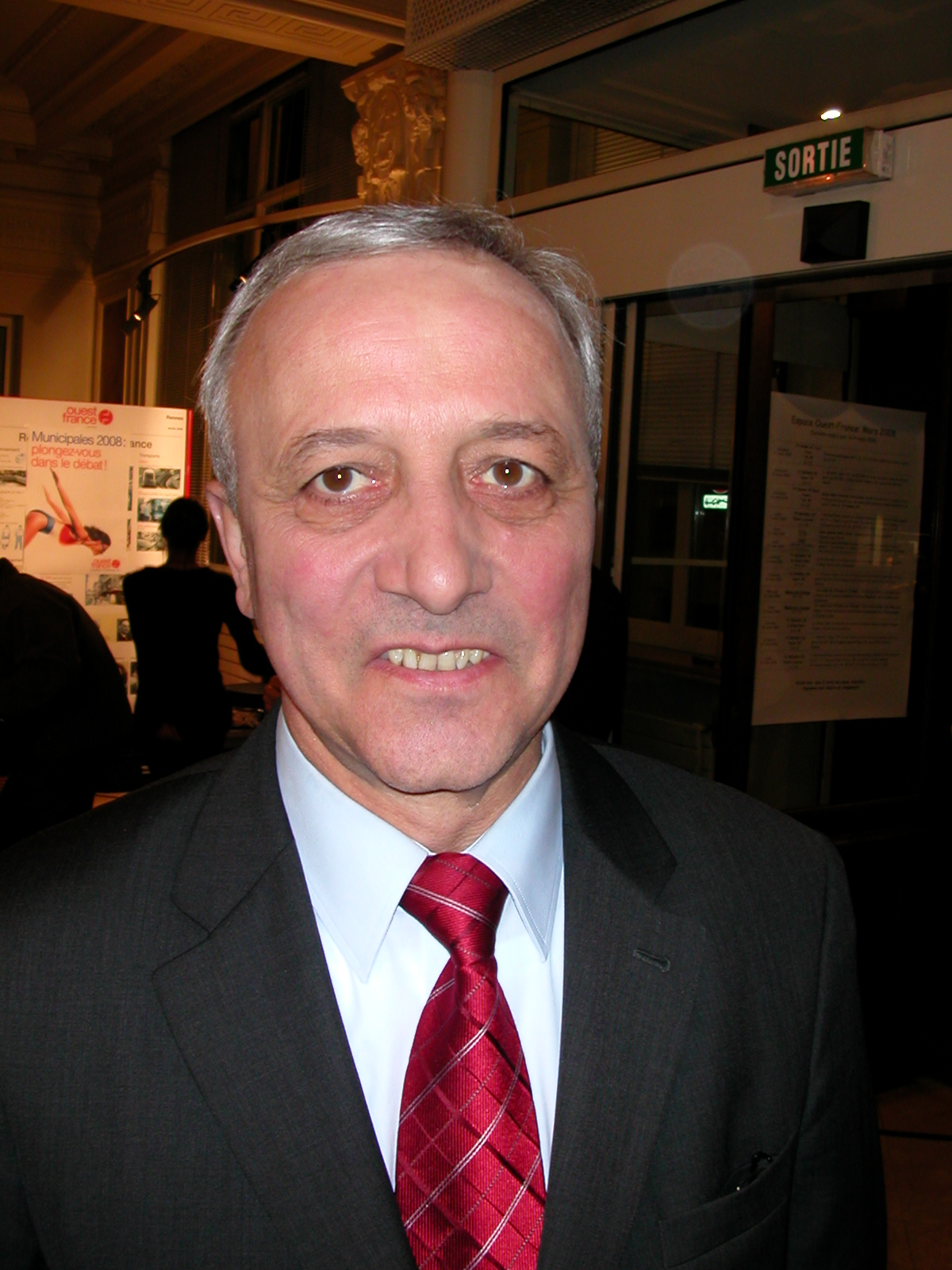

Mayor of Rennes
- In office 2008–2014
- Preceded by: Edmond Hervé
- Succeeded by: Nathalie Appéré

Personal details
- Born: 22 December 1952 (age 73) Châlette-sur-Loing, France
- Party: Socialist Party

Daniel Delaveau (French pronunciation: [danjɛl dəlavo]; born 22 December 1952) is a French politician and former Mayor of Rennes. He is a member of the Socialist Party.

He was born in a working-class family, and was active in Catholic youth organizations before joining the Unified Socialist Party in the 1970s and the PS in 1974. In 1989, he was elected mayor of the Rennes suburb of Saint-Jacques-de-la-Lande and in 1994 he joined the department general council as councillor for Rennes-Sud-Ouest. In September 2007, he was designated by his party to lead the left-wing list (Socialist Party, PCF, PRG, UDB) in the March 2008 Rennes municipal election. In the 2008 local elections, he was elected Mayor of Rennes, succeeding PS incumbent Edmond Hervé, with 60.40% of the votes in the runoff. In December 2012, he announced he would not run for the next municipal election, in March 2014. His former deputy mayor, Nathalie Appéré (Socialist Party), won that election on March 30, 2014.
