= Marcel Rogemont =

French politician

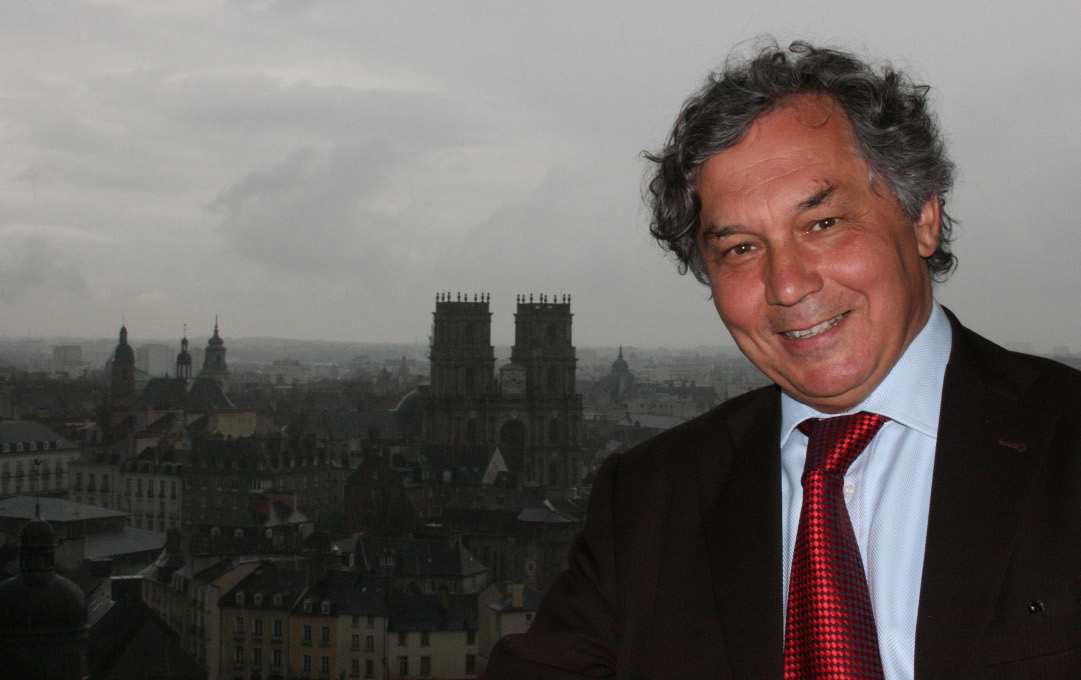
- Marcel Rogemont in 2008

Member of the Departmental council of Ille-et-Vilaine
- In office 2 April 2015 – 27 June 2021

Member of the National Assembly for Ille-et-Vilaine's 8th constituency
- In office 2012–2017
- Preceded by: New constituency
- Succeeded by: Florian Bachelier

Member of the National Assembly for Ille-et-Vilaine's 3rd constituency
- In office 2007–2012
- Preceded by: Philippe Rouault
- Succeeded by: François André
- In office 1997–2002
- Preceded by: Yves Fréville
- Succeeded by: Philippe Rouault

Personal details
- Born: 3 January 1948 (age 78) Coye-la-Forêt, France
- Party: Socialist Party
- Education: Lycée Henri-IV; University of Rennes

Marcel Rogemont (born 3 January 1948) was a member of the National Assembly of France. He represented the Ille-et-Vilaine department, from 2012 to 2017 as a member of the Socialiste, radical, citoyen et divers gauche.

== Biography ==
Marcel Rogemont and other young socialist elected officials gathered around Edmond Hervé at the time of his conquest of the town hall of Rennes in 1977. With them, he deeply marked the local political scene from then. He held uninterrupted office in the municipal council of Rennes from 1977 to 2001. He was one of the assistant mayors from 1977 until his first election as deputy in 1997. He successively was in charge of the personnel, of finances then of culture. Member of the Socialist party until 22 May 2007, he was excluded from it following his dissenting candidature against Laurence Duffaud, official candidate of the PS. He was elected on 17 June 2007, for the XIIIth legislature (2007–2012), in the 3rd district of Ille-et-Vilaine by beating, at the second round, the outgoing deputy Philippe Rouault (UMP) with 52,75% of the votes.

He was elected to the department's new 8th constituency in 2012, but did not contest it at the 2017 election.
