= Ille-et-Vilaine's 5th constituency =

Constituency of the National Assembly of France

5th constituency of Ille-et-Vilaine
- inline Constituency of the National Assembly of France

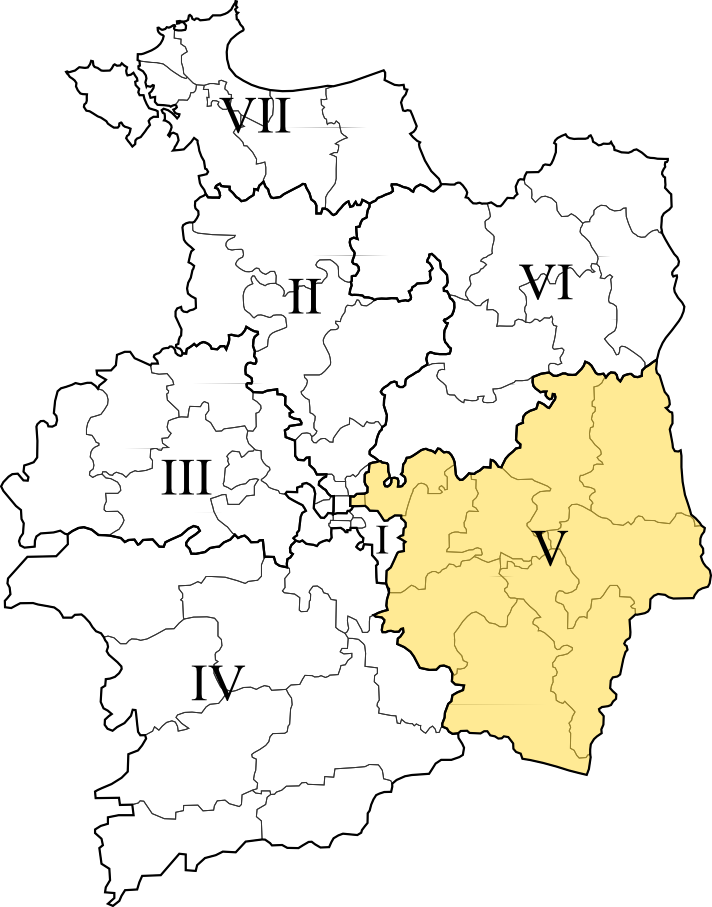
- Constituency in department

- Ille-et-Vilaine in France
- Deputy: Christine Le Nabour-Cloarec; RE
- Department: Ille-et-Vilaine
- Cantons: (pre-2015) Argentré-du-Plessis, Cesson-Sévigné, Châteaubourg, Châteaugiron, La Guerche-de-Bretagne, Janzé, Rennes-Est, Retiers, Vitré-Est, Vitré-Ouest

The 5th constituency of Ille-et-Vilaine is a French legislative constituency in the Ille-et-Vilaine département. Like the other 576 French constituencies, it elects one MP using the two-round system, with a run-off if no candidate receives over 50% of the vote in the first round.

== Deputies ==
Election	Member	Party
1958	Pierre de Bénouville	UNR
1962	Jean Le Lann	MRP
1967	Michel Cointat	UDR
1968	Michel Cointat	UDR
1973	Michel Cointat	UDR
1978	Michel Cointat	RPR
1981	Michel Cointat	RPR
1986	Proportional representation - no election by constituency	
1988	Pierre Méhaignerie	UDF
1993	Pierre Méhaignerie	UDF
1997	Pierre Méhaignerie	UDF
2002	Pierre Méhaignerie	UMP
2007	Pierre Méhaignerie	UMP
2012	Isabelle Le Callennec	UMP
2017	Christine Le Nabour-Cloarec	LREM
2022	Christine Le Nabour-Cloarec	RE

== Election results ==
=== 2024 ===
Candidate	Party	Alliance	First round			Second round		
Candidate	Party	Alliance	Votes	%	+/–	Votes	%	+/–
Christine Le Nabour	REN	Ensemble	33,147	42.42	+7.99	50,267	67.72	
Françoise Gilois	RN		23,298	29.82	+16.40	23,957	32.28	
Gilles Renault	LFI	NFP	20,200	25.85	-0.20	withdrew		
Christelle Jarny	LO		1,493	1.91	+1.12			
Votes			78,138	100.00			100.00	
Valid votes			78,138	96.57	-0.93	742,249	94.32	
Blank votes			1,902	2.35	+0.65	3,279	4.17	
Null votes			870	1.08	+0.28	1,189	1.51	
Turnout			80,910	72.51	+22.02	78,692	70.50	
Abstentions			30,678	27.49	-22.02	32,928	29.50	
Registered voters			111,588			111,620		
Result			REN HOLD					

=== 2022 ===
Legislative Election 2022: Ille-et-Vilaine's 5th constituency
Party	Candidate	Votes	%	±%
LREM (Ensemble)	Christine Le Nabour-Cloarec	18,595	34.43	-6.16
LFI (NUPÉS)	Gilles Renault	14,069	26.05	+6.91
LR (UDC)	Jonathan Houillot	9,067	16.79	−12.89
RN	Françoise Gilois	7,248	13.42	+6.94
REC	Marie De Blic	1,469	2.72	N/A
FGR	Michel Austerlitz	1,262	2.34	N/A
Others	N/A	2,304	4.27	
Turnout		54,014	50.49	−4.76
2nd round result
LREM (Ensemble)	Christine Le Nabour-Cloarec	29,688	58.66	+5.36
LFI (NUPÉS)	Gilles Renault	20,921	41.34	N/A
Turnout		50,609	49.39	+3.19
LREM hold				

=== 2017 ===
Candidate	Label	First round		Second round	
Candidate	Label	Votes	%	Votes	%
Christine Cloarec	REM	22,797	40.59	23,546	53.30
Isabelle Le Callennec	LR	16,667	29.68	20,627	46.70
Mickaël Hugonnet	FI	5,676	10.11		
Laurence Prin	FN	3,637	6.48		
Stéphane Lenfant	PS	3,063	5.45		
Bernard Martin	ECO	2,008	3.58		
Jean-Pierre Charrier	DLF	624	1.11		
Françoise Hamard	EXG	497	0.88		
Gilles Marzin	ECO	362	0.64		
Sabine Comès	REG	320	0.57		
Marie de Blic	DVD	310	0.55		
Alice Mole	DIV	202	0.36		
Votes		56,163	100.00	44,173	100.00
Valid votes		56,163	98.35	44,173	92.56
Blank votes		623	1.09	2,620	5.49
Null votes		318	0.56	932	1.95
Turnout		57,104	55.27	47,725	46.20
Abstentions		46,205	44.73	55,573	53.80
Registered voters		103,309		103,298	
Source: Ministry of the Interior

=== 2012 ===
2012 legislative election in Ille-Et-Vilaine's 5th constituency
Candidate	Party	First round		Second round	
Candidate	Party	Votes	%	Votes	%
Isabelle Le Callennec	UMP	24,640	43.33%	29,995	55.79%
Anne-Laure Loray	PS	19,241	33.84%	23,770	44.21%
Nadège Andre	FN	4,147	7.29%		
Gaëlle Rougier	EELV	2,632	4.63%		
Jean-Marc Lecerf	MoDem	2,511	4.42%		
Joëlle Couillandre	FG	1,666	2.93%		
Teddy Regnier	PR	999	1.76%		
Michelle Le Tennier	DLR	540	0.95%		
Françoise Hamard	LO	490	0.86%		
Valid votes		56,866	98.20%	53,765	97.74%
Spoilt and null votes		1,044	1.80%	1,244	2.26%
Votes cast / turnout		57,910	59.39%	55,009	56.42%
Abstentions		39,593	40.61%	42,494	43.58%
Registered voters		97,503	100.00%	97,503	100.00%

=== 2007 ===
Legislative Election 2007: Ille-et-Vilaine's 5th constituency
Party	Candidate	Votes	%	±%
UMP	Pierre Méhaignerie	39,240	52.68	−6.84
PS	Clotilde Tascon-Mennetrier	17,150	23.03	+1.45
MoDem	Pierre-Yves Martin	9,801	13.16	N/A
UDB	Éliane Leclerc	2,662	3.57	+2.67
FN	Nadège André	1,235	1.66	−2.41
LO	Françoise Hamard	807	1.08	−0.43
PCF	Geneviève Lespagnol	806	1.08	±0.00
DVG	Lydie Porée	732	0.98	N/A
MPF	Aude de la Vergne	723	0.97	−0.28
DIV	Yves Le Mestric	663	0.89	N/A
DIV	Laurent Levrot	662	0.89	N/A
Turnout		75,651	63.69	−2.91
UMP hold		Swing		

=== 2002 ===
Legislative Election 2002: Ille-et-Vilaine's 5th constituency
Party	Candidate	Votes	%	±%
UMP	Pierre Méhaignerie	42,415	59.52	N/A
PS	Clotilde Tascon-Mennetrier	15,378	21.58	+0.01
LV	Catherine Debroise	3,337	4.58	+1.07
FN	Jean-Marie Lebraud	2,900	4.07	−2.32
DVG	Yves Lecompte	1,173	1.65	N/A
LO	Françoise Hamard	1,075	1.51	−2.57
LCR	Jean-François Vial	1,013	1.42	N/A
MPF	Maurice de Quenetain	891	1.25	−1.60
CPNT	René Pelhate	797	1.12	N/A
PCF	Carole Le Trionnaire	767	1.08	−2.76
UDB	Virginie Le Cam	642	0.90	N/A
MNR	Mathilde Bozonnet	453	0.64	N/A
GE	Jean-Claude Héry	415	0.58	−1.64
Turnout		72,592	66.60	−3.32
UMP gain from FD				

=== 1997 ===
Legislative Election 1997: Ille-et-Vilaine's 5th constituency
Party	Candidate	Votes	%	±%
FD (UDF)	Pierre Méhaignerie	33,512	51.43	-10.79
PS	Clotilde Tascon-Mennetrier	14,054	21.57	+9.65
FN	Henri Leroy	4,165	6.39	+0.14
LO	Françoise Hamard	2,659	4.08	+1.11
PCF	Valérie Kerauffret	2,501	3.84	+1.47
LV	Jean-François Vial	2,285	3.51	−2.74
MPF	Charles Preaux	1,855	2.85	N/A
GE	Pascal Moureaux	1,446	2.22	N/A
DVE	Daniel Salmon	1,187	1.21	N/A
MDC	Patrice Prince	788	1.21	N/A
DIV	Chantal Dubois	542	0.83	N/A
DIV	Marie Jumelais-Brucq	149	0.23	−0.30
DIV	Roselyne Rolland	12	0.02	N/A
Turnout		69,306	69.92	−2.96
FD hold				

=== 1993 ===
Legislative Election 1993: Ille-et-Vilaine's 5th constituency
Party	Candidate	Votes	%	±%
UDF	Pierre Méhaignerie	41,085	62.22	−0.54
PS	Guy Gerbaud	7,872	11.92	−13.66
LV	Gael Lagadec	6,949	6.25	
FN	Henri Leroy	4,124	6.25	
LO	Françoise Hamard	1,963	2.97	
PCF	Jean Le Duff	1,565	2.37	
DIV	Edouard Castellano	845	1.28	
DIV	Marcel Lacour	845	1.28	
DIV	Marie Jumelais-Brucq	352	0.53	
Turnout		69,943	72.88	
UDF hold				

== Sources ==
- INSEE's slip of this constituency: "Tableaux et Analyses de la cinquième circonscrition d'Ille-et-Vilaine" (PDF) (in French).
- Liste of Ille-et-Vilaine's deputies from 1789: "Tous les députés du département d'Ille-et-Vilaine depuis 1789" (in French). Archived from the original on 30 September 2007.
- Official results of French elections from 1998: "Résultats électoraux officiels en France" (in French). Archived from the original on 20 December 2011.
