= Claudia Rouaux =

French politician

Deputy for Ille-et-Vilaine's 3rd constituency in the National Assembly of France
- Incumbent
- Assumed office 12 February 2020
- Preceded by: François André
- Parliamentary group: SOC
- Constituency: Ille-et-Vilaine's 3rd constituency

Regional Councillor of Brittany
- Incumbent
- Assumed office 26 March 2010
- Parliamentary group: Socialists and democrats
- Constituency: Ille-et-Vilaine

Personal details
- Born: 13 October 1963 (age 62) Sainte-Gemmes-d'Andigné, France
- Party: PS

Claudia Rouaux (born 13 October 1963) is a French politician of the Socialist Party (PS) who became a member of the Deputy for Ille-et-Vilaine's 3rd constituency following the death of François André in 2017.

Rouaux was elected a municipal councillor for the canton of Montfort-sur-Meu in 2001 and maintained her mandate for 19 years. In 2010, she was elected as a regional councillor for Brittany.

== Political career ==
Rouaux was elected municipal councillor in Montfort-sur-Meu in 2001, as Victor Préauchat's first assistant, then re-elected in 2008. She was the substitute candidate for Marcel Rogemont as a (later dissenting) Socialist candidate for Ille-et-Vilaine's 3rd constituency in the 2007 election. She was a candidate for the socialists in the 2008 cantonal elections in the canton of Montfort-sur-Meu; with 46% of the vote, she was beaten in the second round by Christophe Martins.

=== Member of the National Assembly, 2017–present ===
Rouaux was the substitute candidate for François André for Ille-et-Vilaine's 3rd constituency in the 2017 election. She succeeded André following his death. She was re-elected in the 2022 French legislative election as a PS (NUPES) candidate.

In 2023, Rouaux publicly endorsed the re-election of the Socialist Party's chairman Olivier Faure.
