= Ille-et-Vilaine's 8th constituency =

Constituency of the National Assembly of France

8th constituency of Ille-et-Vilaine
- inline Constituency of the National Assembly of France

- Constituency in department

- Ille-et-Vilaine in France
- Deputy: Mickaël Bouloux; PS
- Department: Ille-et-Vilaine
- Cantons: (pre-2015) Mordelles, Rennes-Nord, Rennes-Centre-Ouest, Rennes-Centre, Rennes-Sud-Ouest.

The 8th constituency of Ille-et-Vilaine is a French legislative constituency in the Ille-et-Vilaine département, mostly in the city of Rennes. Like the other 576 French constituencies, it elects one MP using the two-round system, with a run-off if no candidate receives over 50% of the vote in the first round. It was created when the 2010 redistricting of French legislative constituencies added an 8th constituency to Ille-et-Vilaine.

This is a geographic representation of the constituency:

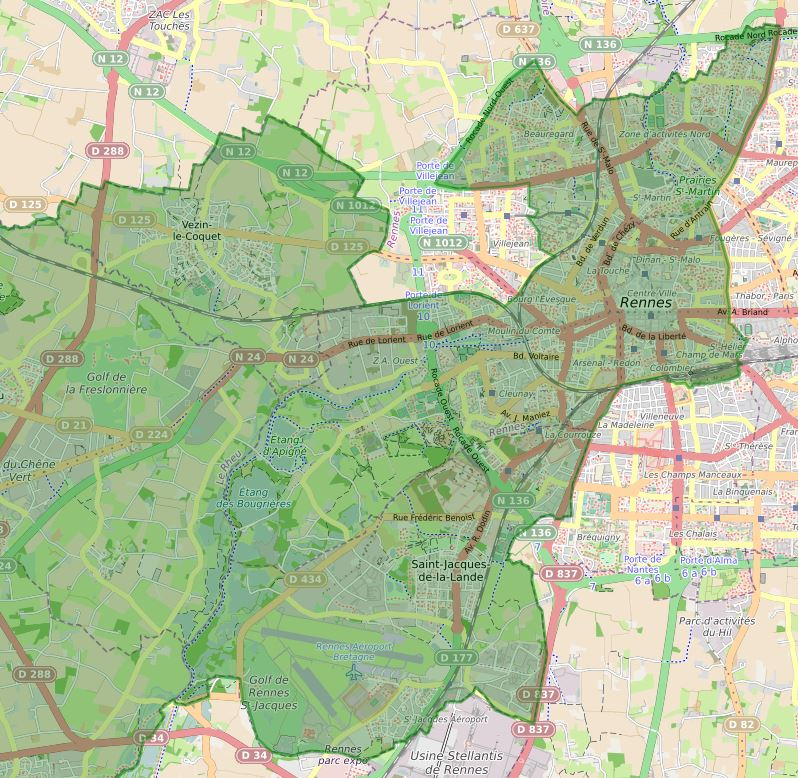
The Eastern part of the constituency

== Historic representation ==
Election	Member	Party
2012	Marcel Rogemont	PS
2017	Florian Bachelier	LREM
2022	Mickaël Bouloux	PS
2024	Mickaël Bouloux	PS

== Election results ==
=== 2024 ===
Candidate	Party	Alliance	First round			Second round		
Candidate	Party	Alliance	Votes	%	+/–	Votes	%	+/–
Mickaël Bouloux	PS	NFP	36,029	52.84	+7.12			
Hermine Mauze	REN	Ensemble	17,517	25.69	-6.57			
Kellie Lucco	RN		9,820	14.40	+7.53			
Mahé Gargam	LR	UDC	3,390	4.97	+2.77			
Maël Egron	REG		768	1.13	new			
Fabrice Lucas	LO		654	0.96	+0.21			
Camille Champalaune	DIV		5	0.01	new			
Votes			68,183	100.00				
Valid votes			68,183	98.45	+0.20			
Blank votes			717	1.04	-0.27			
Null votes			354	0.51	+0.06			
Turnout			69,254	75.31	+20.00			
Abstentions			22,703	24.69	-20.00			
Registered voters			91,957					
Result			PS HOLD					

=== 2022 ===
Legislative Election 2022: Ille-et-Vilaine's 8th constituency
Party	Candidate	Votes	%	±%
PS (NUPÉS)	Mickaël Bouloux	22,610	45.72	+9.72
LREM (Ensemble)	Florian Bachelier	15,950	32.26	-8.68
RN	Marianne Looten	3,399	6.87	+3.05
FGR	Rodolphe Llavori	2,065	4.18	N/A
REC	Régis Barbié De Préaudeau	1,412	2.86	N/A
LR (UDC)	Maël Tournade	1,088	2.20	−9.14
Others	N/A	2,924	5.91	
Turnout		49,448	55.31	−0.94
2nd round result
PS (NUPÉS)	Mickaël Bouloux	28,262	57.97	+18.93
LREM (Ensemble)	Florian Bachelier	20,490	42.03	−18.93
Turnout		48,752	55.87	+9.16
PS gain from LREM				

=== 2017 ===
Candidate	Label	First round		Second round	
Candidate	Label	Votes	%	Votes	%
Florian Bachelier	REM	18,989	40.94	22,111	60.96
Enora Le Pape	FI	6,561	14.14	14,161	39.04
Emmanuel Couet	PS	6,150	13.26		
Amélie Dhalluin	LR	5,258	11.34		
Matthieu Theurier	ECO	3,364	7.25		
Françoise Guillerme	FN	1,770	3.82		
Claire Payen	PCF	627	1.35		
Mistral Oz	DIV	447	0.96		
Thomas Vetel	ECO	424	0.91		
Sébastien Pirou	DLF	385	0.83		
Xavier Debroise	DVG	348	0.75		
Iris Bisson	DIV	342	0.74		
Gwenvael Jéquel	REG	324	0.70		
Anne Nadler	DVD	304	0.66		
Solenn Cochet	DIV	245	0.53		
Fabrice Lucas	EXG	239	0.52		
Manon Boucand	ECO	197	0.42		
Hervé Lejoux	DIV	172	0.37		
Tugdual Radiguet	ECO	167	0.36		
Pierre Priet	EXG	74	0.16		
Votes		46,387	100.00	36,272	100.00
Valid votes		46,387	98.80	36,272	93.04
Blank votes		371	0.79	1,991	5.11
Null votes		191	0.41	722	1.85
Turnout		46,949	56.25	38,985	46.71
Abstentions		36,520	43.75	44,484	53.29
Registered voters		83,469		83,469	
Source: Ministry of the Interior

=== 2012 ===
2012 legislative election in Ille-Et-Vilaine's 8th constituency
Candidate	Party	First round		Second round	
Candidate	Party	Votes	%	Votes	%
Marcel Rogemont	PS	21,484	47.85%	27,460	66.11%
Bruno Chavanat	UMP	11,615	25.87%	14,077	33.89%
Matthieu Theurier	EELV	4,354	9.70%		
Denis Kermen	FG	2,674	5.96%		
Cédric Abdilla	FN	2,513	5.60%		
Marie-Noël Convert	CNIP	471	1.05%		
Thomas Vetel	??	448	1.00%		
Benoît Evellin	PP	365	0.81%		
Jean-Patrick Muller	NPA	310	0.69%		
Fabrice Lucas	LO	205	0.46%		
Félix Henry		149	0.33%		
Lilian Renault	SP	144	0.32%		
Gérard Monnier	POI	135	0.30%		
Céline Lechevalier	AdOC	31	0.07%		
Valid votes		44,898	98.68%	41,537	97.21%
Spoilt and null votes		602	1.32%	1,192	2.79%
Votes cast / turnout		45,500	57.63%	42,729	54.12%
Abstentions		33,453	42.37%	36,221	45.88%
Registered voters		78,953	100.00%	78,950	100.00%
