= Ille-et-Vilaine's 2nd constituency =

Constituency of the National Assembly of France

2nd constituency of Ille-et-Vilaine
- inline Constituency of the National Assembly of France

- Constituency in department

- Ille-et-Vilaine in France
- Deputy: Tristan Lahais; G.s
- Department: Ille-et-Vilaine
- Cantons: (pre-2015) Betton, Combourg, Hédé, Rennes-Centre, Rennes-Nord, Rennes-Nord-Est, Saint-Aubin-d'Aubigné, Tinténiac

The 2nd constituency of Ille-et-Vilaine is a French legislative constituency in the Ille-et-Vilaine département. Like the other 576 French constituencies, it elects one MP using the two-round system, with a run-off if no candidate receives over 50% of the vote in the first round. It has had a higher turn-over in deputies than most constituencies of the National Assembly.

== Deputies ==
Election	Member	Party
1958	Henri Jouault	CNIP
1962	François Le Douarec	UNR
1967	François Le Douarec	UDR
1968	François Le Douarec	UDR
1973	François Le Douarec	UDR
1978	François Le Douarec	RPR
1981	Jean-Michel Boucheron	PS
1986	Proportional representation - no election by constituency	
1988	Edmond Hervé	PS
1993	Yvon Jacob	RPR
1997	Edmond Hervé	PS
2002	Philippe Tourtelier	PS
2007	Philippe Tourtelier	PS
2012	Nathalie Appéré	PS
2017	Laurence Maillart-Méhaignerie	MoDem
2017	Laurence Maillart-Méhaignerie	LREM
2022	Laurence Maillart-Méhaignerie	LREM
2024	Tristan Lahais	Génération.s

== Election results ==
=== 2024 ===
Candidate	Party	Alliance	First round			Second round		
Candidate	Party	Alliance	Votes	%	+/–	Votes	%	+/–
Tristan Lahais	G.s	NFP	30,361	40.31	+0.80	32,489	43.65	
Laurence Maillart-Méhaignerie	REN	Ensemble	25,792	34.24	-7.17	29,342	39.42	
Bérénice Vanhaecke	RN		13,130	17.43	+9.02	12,595	16.92	
Christophe Decourcelle	LR	UDC	5,218	6.93	new			
Florence Defrance	LO		746	0.99	-0.14			
Olivier Hanne	DIV		71	0.09	new			
Votes			75,318	100.00			100.00	
Valid votes			75,318	98.08	+0.22	74,426	98.01	
Blank votes			1,022	1.33	-0.30	1,111	1.46	
Null votes			450	0.59	+0.09	403	0.53	
Turnout			76,790	76.87	+20.03	75,940	76.00	
Abstentions			23,110	23.13	-20.03	23,975	24.00	
Registered voters			99,900			99,915		
Result			G.s GAIN					

=== 2022 ===
Legislative Election 2022: Ille-et-Vilaine's 2nd constituency
Party	Candidate	Votes	%	±%
LREM (Ensemble)	Laurence Maillart-Méhaignerie	22,630	41.41	-5.07
G.s (NUPÉS)	Tristan Lahais	21,596	39.51	+9.58
RN	Stéphanie Cadiou	4,598	8.41	+3.41
REC	Jean-Pierre Charote	2,204	4.03	N/A
UDB	Mathilde Lahogue	1,154	2.11	N/A
Others	N/A	2,472	4.52	
Turnout		54,654	56.84	−1.60
2nd round result
LREM (Ensemble)	Laurence Maillart-Méhaignerie	28,165	51.82	-22.62
G.s (NUPÉS)	Tristan Lahais	26,190	48.18	N/A
Turnout		54,355	57.72	+12.13
LREM gain from MoDem				

=== 2017 ===
Candidate	Label	First round		Second round	
Candidate	Label	Votes	%	Votes	%
Laurence Maillart-Méhaignerie	MoDem	24,727	46.48	26,922	74.44
Bertrand Plouvier	LR	6,472	12.16	9,243	25.56
Louis Fricker	FI	6,183	11.62		
Gaëlle Andro	PS	6,173	11.60		
Lucile Koch	ECO	2,884	5.42		
Julien Masson	FN	2,658	5.00		
Christophe Rouyer	DVD	816	1.53		
Evelyne Forcioli	PCF	686	1.29		
Daniel Cueff	REG	625	1.17		
Guillaume Monrocq	DIV	421	0.79		
Jeanne Richomme	ECO	347	0.65		
Yves Picard	DIV	311	0.58		
Yann Réminiac	ECO	305	0.57		
Florence Defrance	EXG	301	0.57		
Denis Lemercier	DIV	293	0.55		
Laëtitia Claudic	DVD	0	0.00		
Guillaume Hardy	DIV	0	0.00		
Votes		53,202	100.00	36,165	100.00
Valid votes		53,202	98.64	36,165	86.28
Blank votes		531	0.98	4,478	10.68
Null votes		203	0.38	1,271	3.03
Turnout		53,936	58.44	41,914	45.41
Abstentions		38,356	41.56	50,380	54.59
Registered voters		92,292		92,294	
Source: Ministry of the Interior

=== 2012 ===
2012 legislative election in Ille-Et-Vilaine's 2nd constituency
Candidate	Party	First round		Second round	
Candidate	Party	Votes	%	Votes	%
Nathalie Appere	PS	25,509	48.10%	32,040	63.45%
Bertrand Plouvier	UMP	16,158	30.46%	18,458	36.55%
Gilles Nicolas	EELV	4,387	8.27%		
Françoise Rubion	FG	3,097	5.84%		
Pascal Crambert	FN	2,862	5.40%		
Simon Danjou	JB (BNAFET)	389	0.73%		
Florence Defrance	LO	324	0.61%		
Claude Duc-Mauge	NPA	312	0.59%		
Valid votes		53,038	98.58%	50,498	97.55%
Spoilt and null votes		766	1.42%	1,266	2.45%
Votes cast / turnout		53,804	61.87%	51,764	59.52%
Abstentions		33,160	38.13%	35,203	40.48%
Registered voters		86,964	100.00%	86,967	100.00%

=== 2007 ===
Legislative Election 2007: Ille-et-Vilaine's 2nd constituency
Party	Candidate	Votes	%	±%
PS	Philippe Tourtelier	23,483	38.21	−0.73
UMP	Loïck Le Brun	22,793	37.09	+13.17
MoDem	Anne-Marie Tirel	6,202	10.09	N/A
LV	Jean-Marie Goater	2,803	4.56	+0.40
LCR	Valérie Faucheux	2,020	3.29	+1.76
Others	N/A	4,158	-	−
Turnout		62,319	63.52	−2.93
2nd round result
PS	Philippe Tourtelier	34,841	56.43	+3.94
UMP	Loïck Le Brun	26,902	43.57	−3.94
Turnout		63,049	64.28	−0.99
PS hold				

=== 2002 ===
Legislative Election 2002: Ille-et-Vilaine's 2nd constituency
Party	Candidate	Votes	%	±%
PS	Philippe Tourtelier	22,879	38.94	+1.98
UMP	Loïck Le Brun	14,052	23.92	−5.44
DVD	Benoît Caron*	10,918	18.58	N/A
FN	André Poulain	2,663	4.53	−1.82
LV	Nicole Kill-Nielsen	2,445	4.16	−0.21
Others	N/A	5,793	-	−
Turnout		59,822	66.45	−1.68
2nd round result
PS	Philippe Tourtelier	30,146	52.49	−2.39
UMP	Loïck Le Brun	27,287	47.51	+2.39
Turnout		58,760	65.27	−7.81
PS hold				

* UMP dissident

=== 1997 ===
Legislative Election 1997: Ille-et-Vilaine's 2nd constituency
Party	Candidate	Votes	%	±%
PS	Edmond Hervé	19,662	36.96	
RPR	Yvon Jacob	15,621	29.36	
FN	Daniel Tocqué	3,379	6.35	
UDF	Stéphane Jambois*	2,790	5.24	
PCF	Eliane Poirier	2,386	4.48	
LV	Nicole Kilnielsen	2,324	4.37	
LO	Raymond Madec	1,833	3.45	
DVE	Dominique Boullier	1,248	2.35	
LDI	Bertrand Mathieu	1,194	2.24	
GE	Jean Peeters	1,074	2.02	
Others	N/A	1,689	-	
Turnout		55,746	68.13	
2nd round result
PS	Edmond Hervé	31,249	54.88	
RPR	Yvon Jacob	25,694	45.12	
Turnout		59,793	73.08	
PS gain from RPR				

=== 1993 ===
Legislative Election 1993: Ille-et-Vilaine 2nd - 2nd round
Party	Candidate	Votes	%	±%
RPR	Yvon Jacob	29,747	54.90	
PS	Edmond Hervé	24,437	45.10	
Turnout		57,650	70.71	
RPR gain from PS		Swing		

=== 1981 ===
Legislative Election 1981: Ille-et-Vilaine 2nd - 2nd round
Party	Candidate	Votes	%	±%
PS	Jean-Michel Boucheron	55,424	56.86	
RPR	André Guillou	41,858	43.13	
Turnout		98,457	73.75	
PS gain from RPR		Swing		

== Sources ==
- INSEE's slip of this constituency: "Tableaux et Analyses de la deuxième circonscrition d'Ille-et-Vilaine" (PDF) (in French).
- List of Ille-et-Vilaine's deputies from 1789: "Tous les députés du département d'Ille-et-Vilaine depuis 1789" (in French). Archived from the original on 30 September 2007.
- Official results of French elections from 1998: "Résultats électoraux officiels en France" (in French). Archived from the original on 20 December 2011.
