= Canton of Châteaubourg =

Coordinates: 48.0837°N 1.3834°W

Châteaubourg
- Former canton
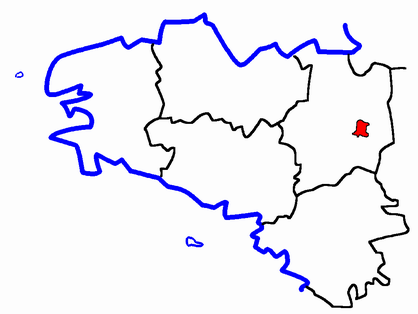
- Country: France
- Region: Brittany
- Department: Ille-et-Vilaine
- No. of communes: {{{nbcomm}}}
- Disbanded: 2015
- Area: 106.83 km^{2} (41.25 sq mi)
- Population (2012): 14,427
  - Density: 135.05/km^{2} (349.77/sq mi)

The Canton of Châteaubourg is a former canton of France, in the Ille-et-Vilaine département, located in the east of the department. It was disbanded following the French canton reorganisation which came into effect in March 2015. It consisted of 6 communes, and its population was 14,427 in 2012.
