= Christine Cloarec =

French politician (born 1964)

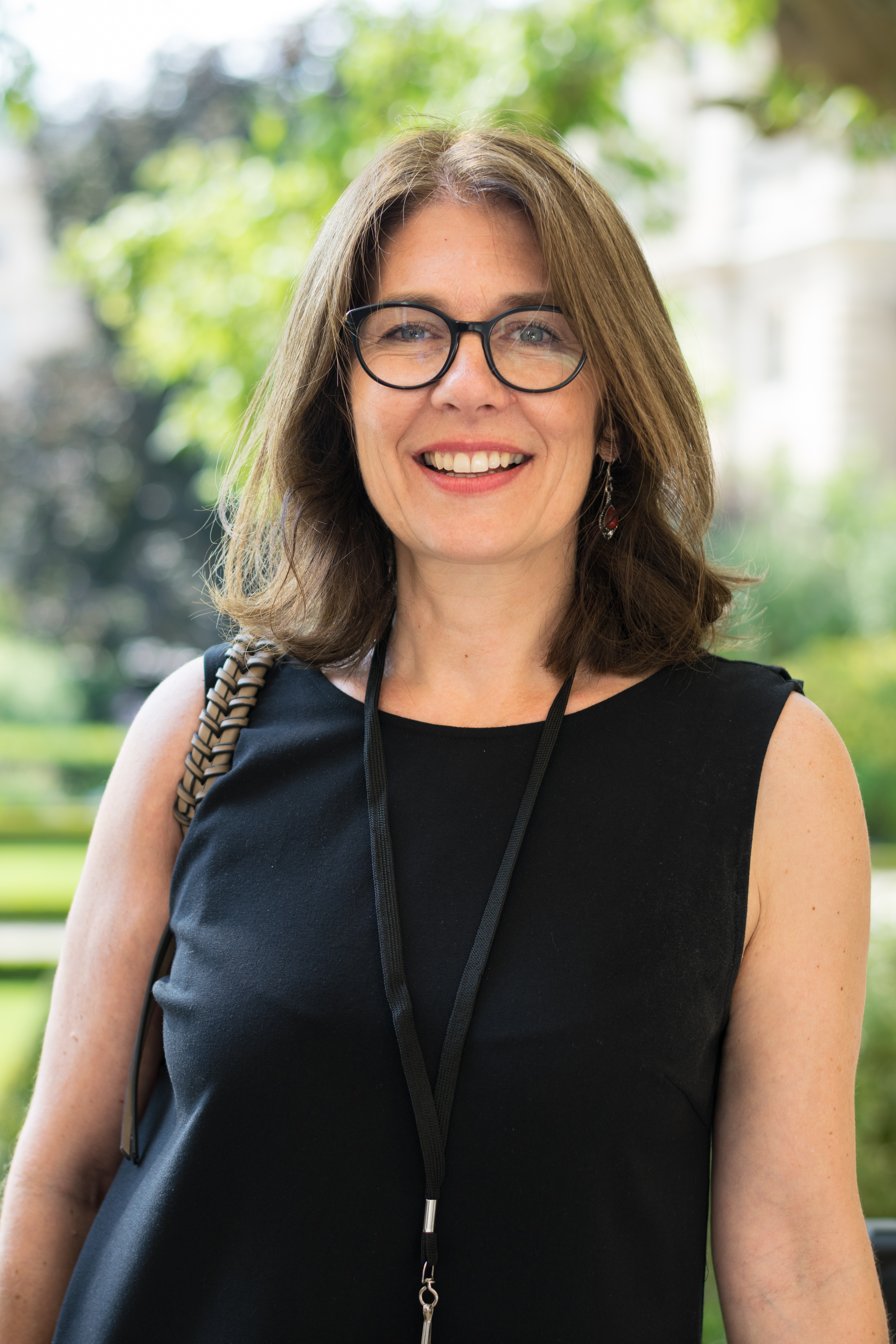

Deputy of Ille-et-Vilaine's 5th constituency
- Incumbent
- Assumed office 21 June 2017
- Preceded by: Isabelle Le Callennec

Personal details
- Born: 28 October 1964 (age 61) Noisy-le-Sec, France
- Party: Renaissance
- Education: Rennes 2 University

Christine Cloarec (born 28 October 1964) is a French politician representing Renaissance (RE) She was elected to the French National Assembly on 18 June 2017, representing the department of Ille-et-Vilaine.

== Early life and education ==
A dance teacher in Vitré, Cloarec was born in Romainville, Seine-Saint-Denis and went to Brittany in 1978 to study STAPS.

== Political career ==
Cloarec was formerly a member of the UDI before joining La République En Marche! in early 2017.

In parliament, Cloarec serves as member of the Committee on Social Affairs. In addition to her committee assignments, she is part of the French-Italian Parliamentary Friendship Group.

== Political positions ==
In September 2018, following the appointment of François de Rugy to the government, Cloarec supported the candidacy of Barbara Pompili as President of the National Assembly.
