= François André =

French politician (1967–2020)

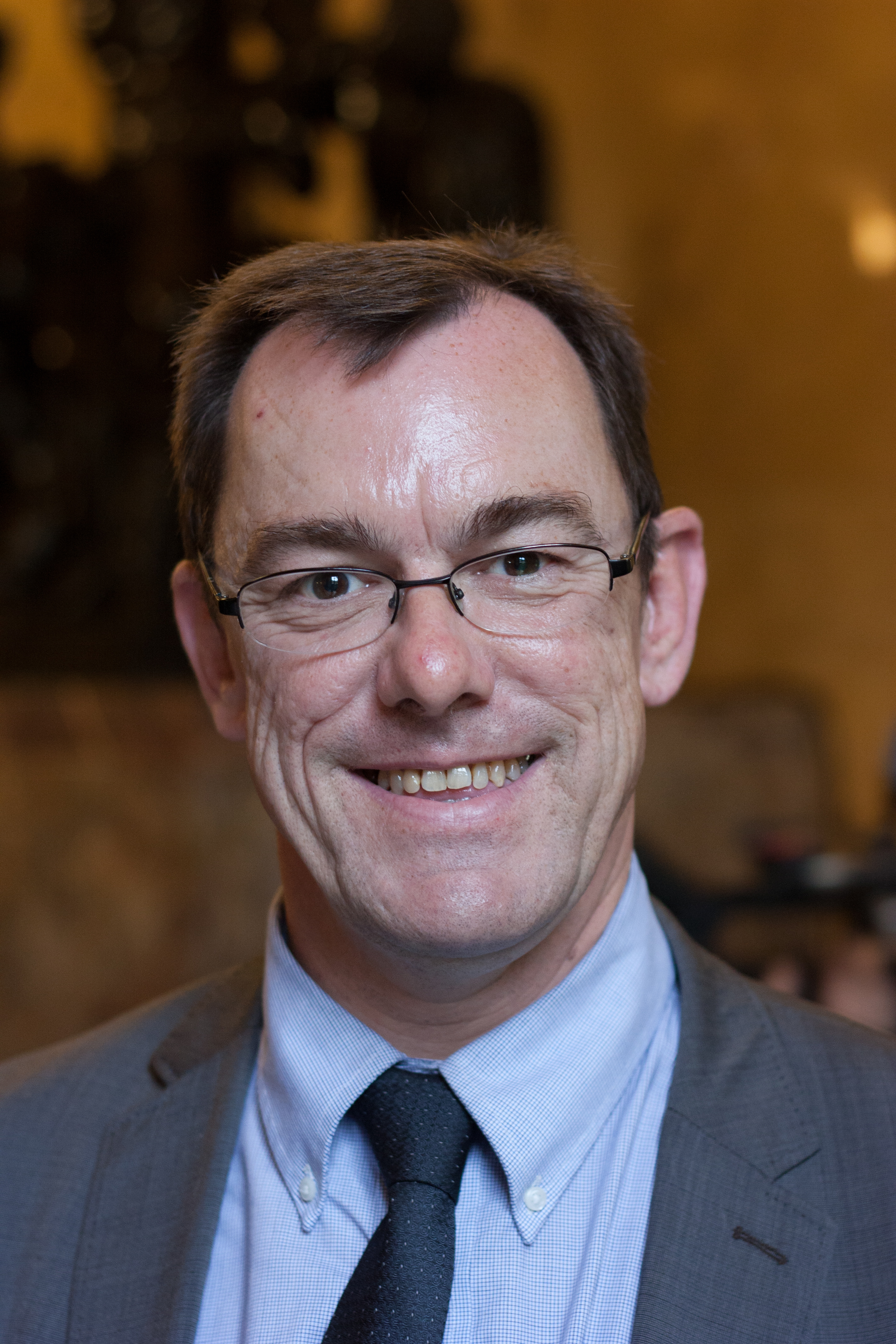
- François André in 2012

Member of the National Assembly for Ille-et-Vilaine's 3rd constituency
- In office 20 June 2012 – 11 February 2020
- Preceded by: Marcel Rogemont
- Succeeded by: Claudia Rouaux

Member of the Departmental council of Ille-et-Vilaine
- In office 16 March 2008 – 11 February 2020
- Preceded by: Philippe Rouault
- Succeeded by: Loïc Le Fur

Personal details
- Born: 19 July 1967 Pontivy, France
- Died: 11 February 2020 (aged 52) Rennes, France
- Cause of death: Lung cancer
- Party: Socialist Party

François André (19 July 1967 – 11 February 2020) was a French politician representing the Socialist Party. He was re-elected to the French National Assembly on 18 June 2017, representing the department of Ille-et-Vilaine.

He was first elected as a councilor for Rennes as part of the PS in 2001. In 2008, André was elected as the head of the Canton of Rennes-Nord-Ouest. He decided not to vote for the PS candidate in the 2017 French presidential election, Benoît Hamon, in the first round, and instead voted for Emmanuel Macron, the candidate for En Marche! He died from lung cancer on 11 February 2020, aged 52.

== See also ==
- 2017 French legislative election
