= Canton of Vitré-Ouest =

Coordinates: 48.1611°N 1.272°W

Vitré-Ouest
- Former canton
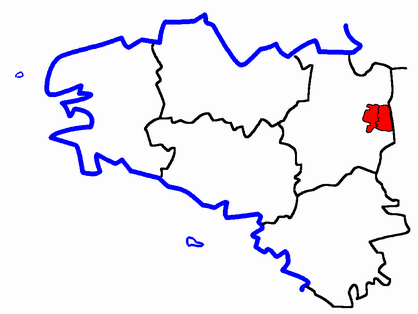
- Country: France
- Region: Brittany
- Department: Ille-et-Vilaine
- No. of communes: {{{nbcomm}}}
- Disbanded: 2015
- Population (2012): 15,350

The Canton of Vitré-Ouest is a former canton of France, in the Ille-et-Vilaine département, located in the east of the department. It was disbanded following the French canton reorganisation which came into effect in March 2015. It consisted of 13 communes (of which one partly), and its population was 15,350 in 2012.
