= Mickaël Bouloux =

French politician (born 1972)

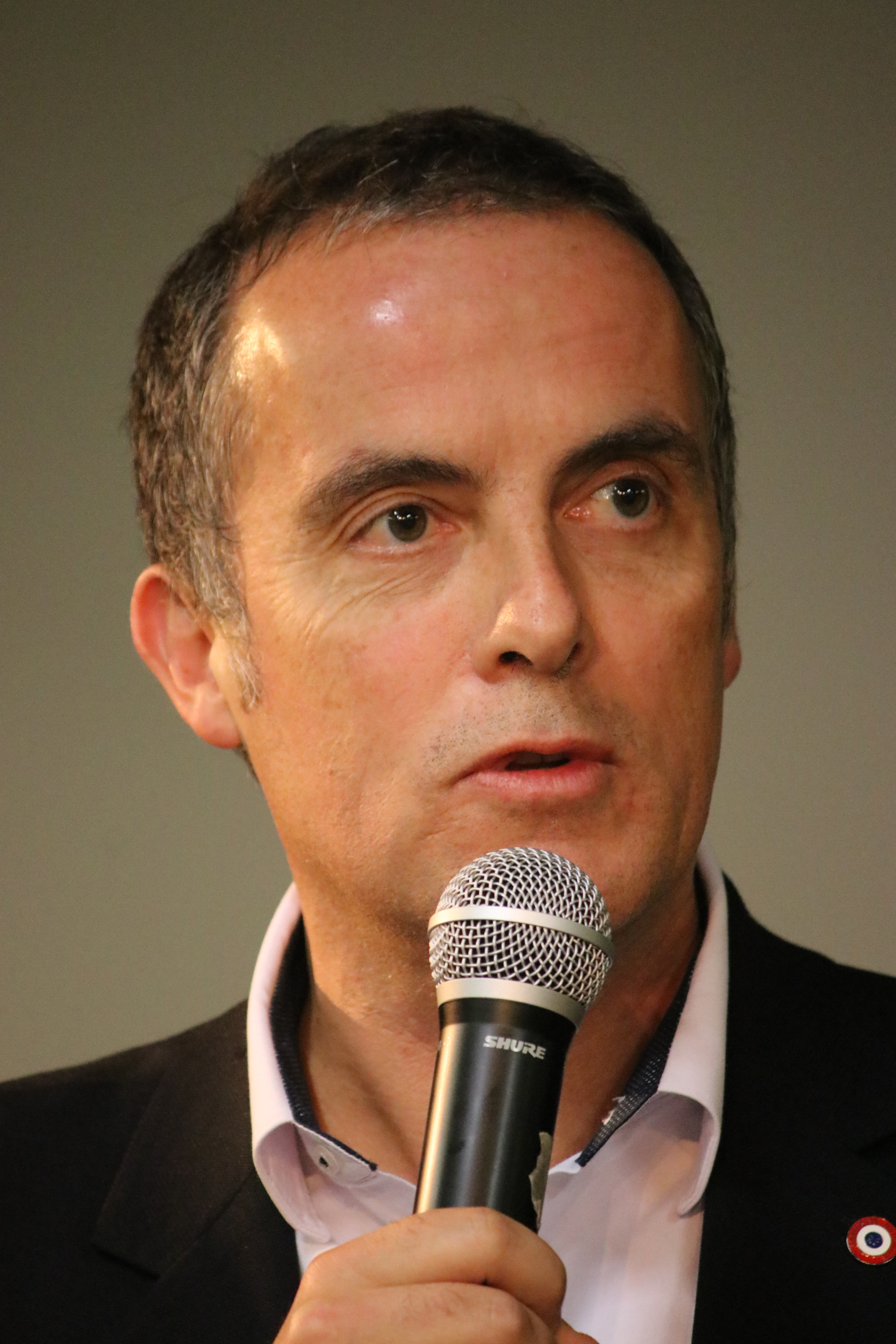
- Mickaël Bouloux during the "Public meeting for our pensions" in February 2023 in Tours
- Parliamentary group: Socialist (NUPES)

Deputy for Ille-et-Vilaine's 8th constituency in the National Assembly of France
- Incumbent
- Assumed office 22 June 2022
- Preceded by: Florian Bachelier

Personal details
- Born: 16 August 1972 (age 54) Dinan (Côtes-d'Armor)

Mickaël Bouloux, born 16 August 1972 in Dinan, is a French politician. He is a member of the Socialist Party, and was the mayor of Le Rheu from 2015 to 2022 and elected as deputy for Ille-et-Vilaine's 8th constituency in the 2022 election as part of the NUPES group. He retained his seat in the 2024 election, winning in the first round.

== Early life ==
Bouloux was born on 16 August 1972 in Dinan, to a father who worked at the arsenal of the military port of Cherbourg and a mother who worked for the Post Office.

He completed the Classe préparatoire aux grandes écoles in Rennes and the École supérieure d'électricité, from which he graduated in 1995, with a degree in computer science. He worked as an engineer at Orange.
