= La Bouillie, Côtes-d'Armor =

La Bouillie Ar Vezvid
- Commune
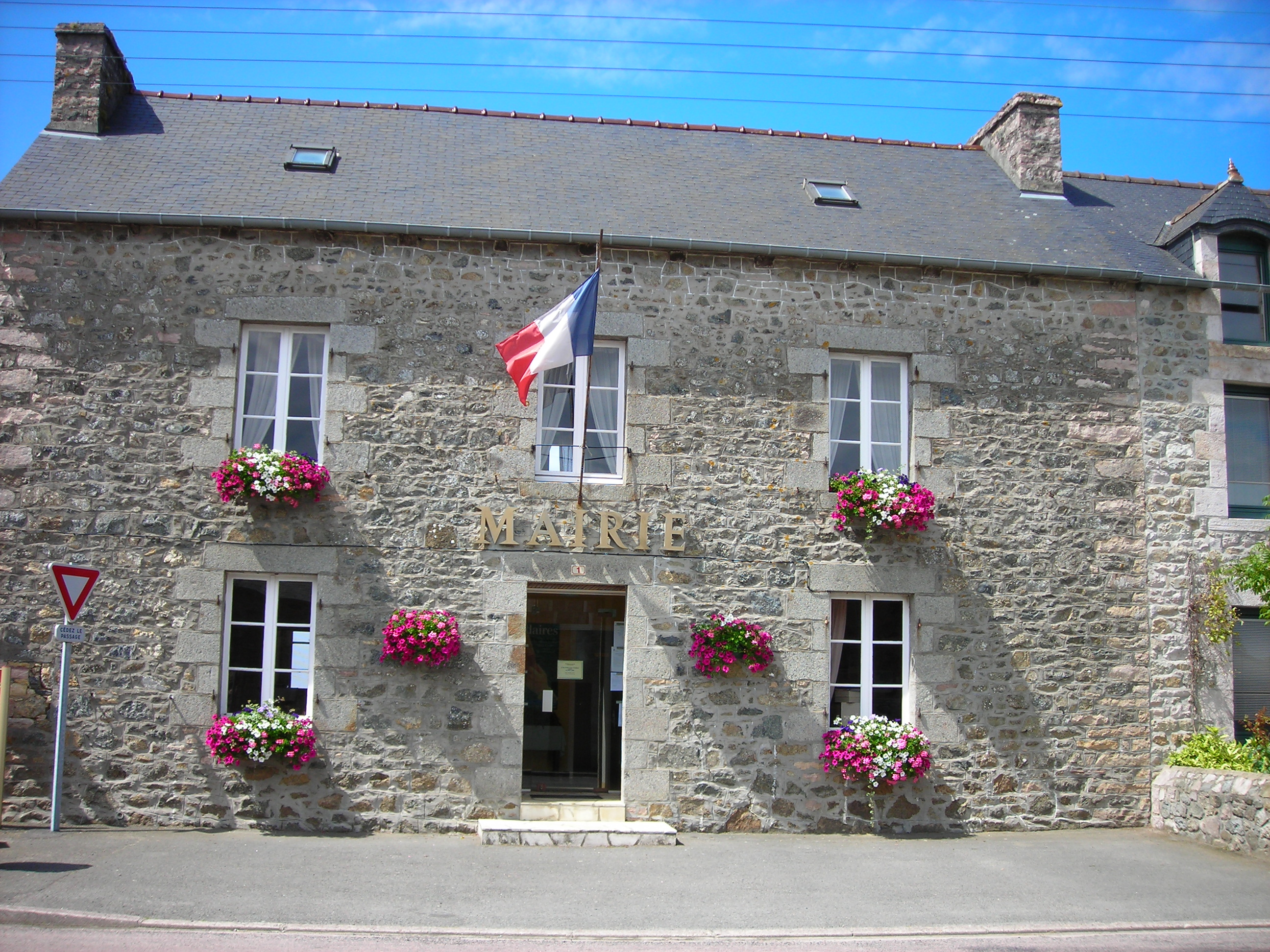
- Town hall
- Location of La Bouillie
- Location within France Location within Brittany
- Coordinates: 48°34′29″N 2°26′03″W
- Country: France
- Region: Brittany
- Department: Côtes-d'Armor
- Arrondissement: Saint-Brieuc
- Canton: Pléneuf-Val-André
- Intercommunality: CA Lamballe Terre et Mer

Government
  - Mayor (2020–2026): Pascal Lebreton
- Area^{1}: 10.91 km^{2} (4.21 sq mi)
- Highest elevation: 111 m (364 ft)
- Lowest elevation: 43 m (141 ft)
- Population (2023): 824
  - Density: 75.5/km^{2} (196/sq mi)
- Time zone: UTC+01:00 (CET)
  - Summer (DST): UTC+02:00 (CEST)
- INSEE/Postal code: 22012 /22240
- ^{1} French Land Register data, which excludes lakes, ponds, glaciers > 1 km^{2} (0.386 sq mi or 247 acres) and river estuaries.

La Bouillie (French pronunciation: [la buji]; Breton: Ar Vezvid; Gallo: Labólhi) is a commune in the Côtes-d'Armor department of Brittany in northwestern France.

== Population ==
Historical population
Year	Pop.	±% p.a.
1968	597	—
1975	601	+0.10%
1982	669	+1.54%
1990	711	+0.76%
1999	664	−0.76%
2007	802	+2.39%
2012	853	+1.24%
2017	860	+0.16%
2023	824	−0.71%
Source: INSEE

Inhabitants of La Bouillie are called Lambolliens in French.

== See also ==
- Communes of the Côtes-d'Armor department
