= Canton of Argentré-du-Plessis =

Coordinates: 48.0291°N 1.1697°W

Argentré-du-Plessis
- Former canton
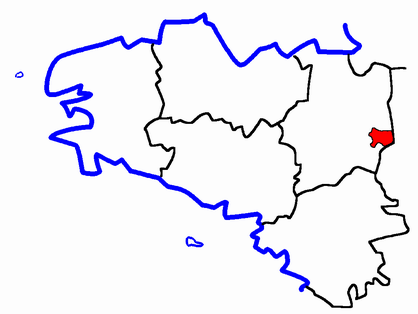
- Country: France
- Region: Brittany
- Department: Ille-et-Vilaine
- No. of communes: {{{nbcomm}}}
- Disbanded: 2015
- Area: 212.24 km^{2} (81.95 sq mi)
- Population (2012): 14,523
  - Density: 68.427/km^{2} (177.23/sq mi)

The Canton of Argentré-du-Plessis is a former canton of France, in the Ille-et-Vilaine département, located in the east of the department. It was disbanded following the French canton reorganisation which came into effect in March 2015. It consisted of 9 communes, and its population was 14,523 in 2012.
