= Canton of Retiers =

Coordinates: 47.8987°N 1.3867°W

Retiers
- Former canton
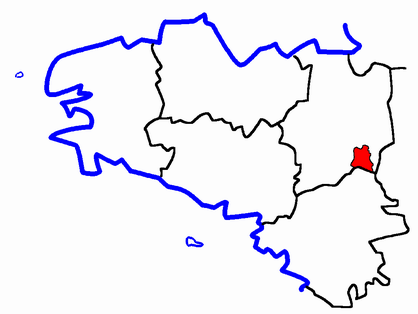
- Country: France
- Region: Brittany
- Department: Ille-et-Vilaine
- No. of communes: {{{nbcomm}}}
- Disbanded: 2015
- Area: 248.69 km^{2} (96.02 sq mi)
- Population (2012): 13,391
  - Density: 53.846/km^{2} (139.46/sq mi)

The Canton of Retiers is a former canton of France, in the Ille-et-Vilaine département, located in the southeast of the department. It was disbanded following the French canton reorganisation which came into effect in March 2015. It consisted of 10 communes, and its population was 13,391 in 2012.
