= Laurence Maillart-Méhaignerie =

French politician

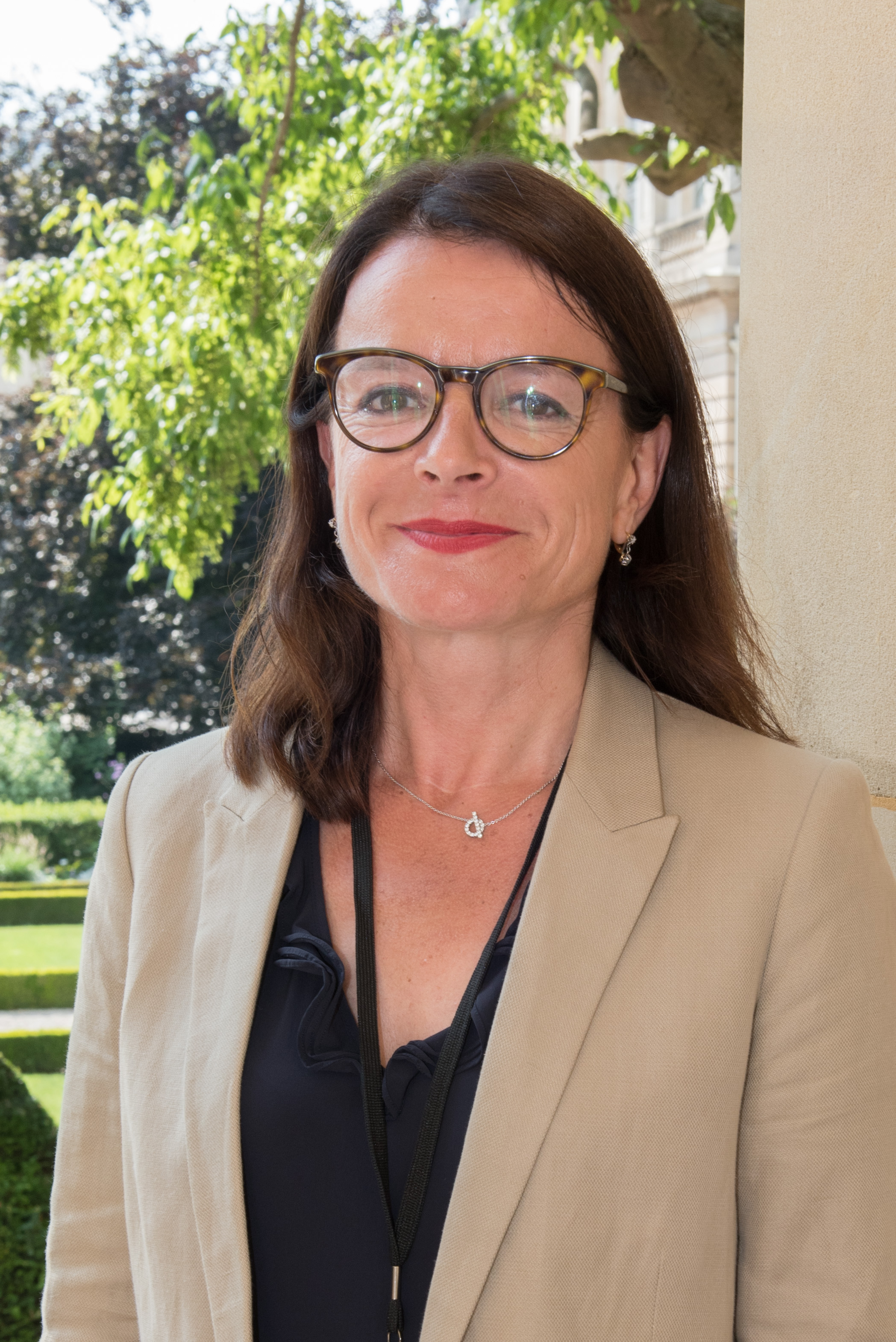

Member of the National Assembly of France for Ille-et-Vilaine's 2nd constituency
- Incumbent
- Assumed office 18 June 2017
- Preceded by: Nathalie Appéré

Personal details
- Born: 5 April 1967 (age 59) Paris, France
- Party: Renaissance (since 2017)
- Children: 3

Laurence Maillart-Méhaignerie (French pronunciation: [lɔʁɑ̃s majaʁ meɛɲʁi]; 5 April 1967) is a French politician of Renaissance (RE) who has been serving as a member of the National Assembly since 2017, representing Ille-et-Vilaine's 2nd constituency.

== Early life and career ==
Maillart was born on 5 April 1967 in the 12th arrondissement of Paris. She holds a masters in economics / business management, and a masters in political science.

First responsible for European affairs in the Brittany region between 1992 and 2000, Maillart then worked at the Caisse des dépôts et consignations. She runs the editorial agency Mediaverbe, that she founded in 2007.

== Political career ==
Maillart-Méhaignerie's first political commitment dates from the 2014 European elections. She was in second place on the list "UDI • MoDem • Europeans • List supported by François Bayrou and Jean-Louis Borloo. She became part-time parliamentary collaborator of Jean Arthuis, MEP, in constituency, from this year until his inauguration in the legislative elections on May 17, 2017. In 2015, she ran for 6th constituency on the list. of Ille-et-Vilaine for the regional elections.

A member of the centrist Alliance, a component of the UDI, since 2014, Maillart-Méhaignerie was invested by the party on June 28, 2016, for the legislative elections of 2017 in the second constituency of Ille-et-Vilaine. His investiture was not renewed following the agreement signed between the Republicans and the UDI for the legislative elections, probably because of her rallying to En marche!

In January 2017, Maillart-Méhaignerie announced her support for Emmanuel Macron. From then on, she campaigned with En marche! and co-hosted the Beaulieu / Jeanne d'Arc committee. In May, the party invested her for the June legislative elections in the colors of the MoDem after the withdrawal of Gaspard Gantzer. On 18 June 2017, she won the second round of the legislative election by beating Les Républicains candidate Bertrand Plouvier, by 74.44% of the votes cast. She succeeded the socialist mayor of Rennes, Nathalie Appéré, who did not run again.

In parliament, Maillart-Méhaignerie is a member of the Sustainable Development, Spatial and Regional Planning Committee, which she has been chairing since 2020. In addition to her committee assignments, she is part of the French-Swiss Parliamentary Friendship Group, the French-Singaporean Parliamentary Friendship Group, and the French-Moldovan Parliamentary Friendship Group.

== Political positions ==
In July 2019, Maillart-Méhaignerie voted in favour of the French ratification of the European Union’s Comprehensive Economic and Trade Agreement (CETA) with Canada.

== Personal life ==
Maillart-Méhaignerie is married and is mother of three children.
