= Canton of Vitré-Est =

Coordinates: 48.1547°N 1.130°W

Vitré-Est
- Former canton
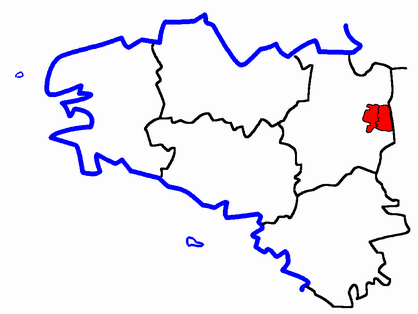
- Country: France
- Region: Brittany
- Department: Ille-et-Vilaine
- No. of communes: {{{nbcomm}}}
- Disbanded: 2015
- Population (2012): 22,776

The Canton of Vitré-Est is a former canton of France, in the Ille-et-Vilaine département, located in the east of the department. It was disbanded following the French canton reorganisation which came into effect in March 2015. It consisted of 10 communes (of which one partly), and its population was 22,776 in 2012.
