= Edmond Hervé =

French politician (born 1942)

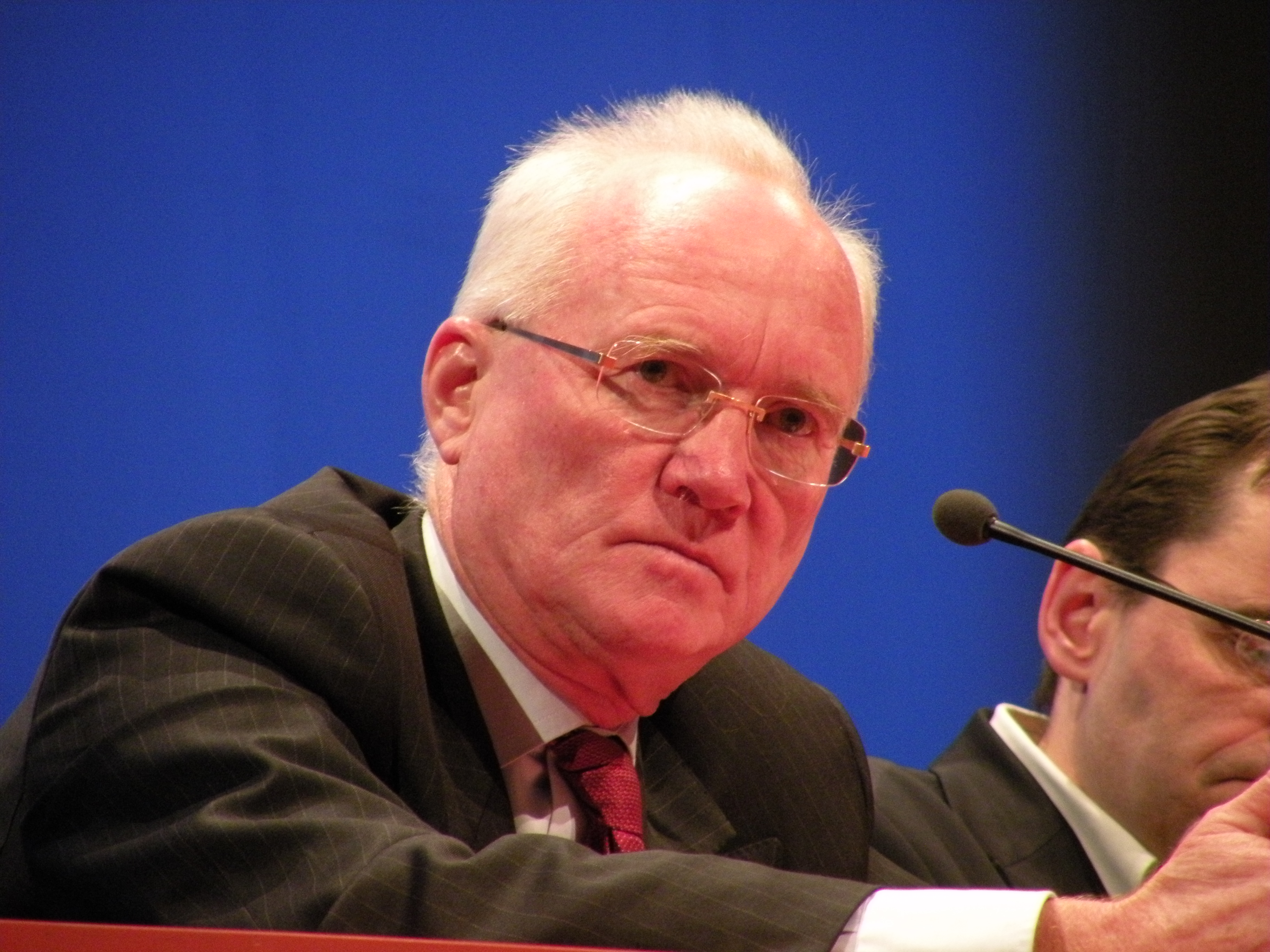
- Edmond Hervé during Forum Libération 2010 in Rennes

Member of the French Senate for Ille-et-Vilaine
- In office 1 October 2008 – 30 September 2014

Mayor of Rennes
- In office 16 March 1977 – 21 March 2008
- Preceded by: Henri Fréville
- Succeeded by: Daniel Delaveau

Secretary of State for Health
- In office 24 March 1983 – 20 March 1986
- President: François Mitterrand
- Prime Minister: Pierre Mauroy; Laurent Fabius
- Preceded by: Jack Ralite
- Succeeded by: Michèle Barzach

Personal details
- Born: 3 December 1942 (age 83) La Bouillie, France
- Party: Socialist Party
- Children: 3
- Education: University of Rennes

Edmond Hervé (French pronunciation: [ɛdmɔ̃ ɛʁve]; born 3 December 1942) is a French politician, a member of the Socialist Party and French senator from 2008 to 2014. He was the mayor of Rennes from 1977 to 2008, succeeding Henri Fréville.

== Biography ==
Born in La Bouillie, Côtes-d'Armor, the son of tenant farmers, Hervé graduated in public law at the University of Rennes and also has a graduate degree in political science. He became a teacher in administrative law and in constitutional law in 1969. Hervé has a daughter and twin sons.

=== Mayor of Rennes ===
Hervé made his way in politics through activism and became the mayor of Rennes in 1977. He abandoned his job as a teacher to dedicate himself to his mandate. He started an innovative urban policy which he carried on fervently: social mix, support for cultural activities, ecology, development of public transportation (see Rennes Metro). On 20 January 2007, he announced that he would not apply for a 6th mandate as mayor of the city.

=== Deputy and minister ===
Hervé was elected for the first time as deputy during the legislative election in 1981. He became French Minister of Health (1981 / 1983–1986) and Minister of Energy (1981–1983). As Secretary of Health in the Fabius government, he was found guilty on 3 March 1999 by the court of justice of the Republic in the case of contaminated blood but has been dispensed from any punishment.

He has been reelected as deputy in 1986, 1988 and 1997, although defeated in 1993. He decided not to apply for 2002 French legislative election.

On 21 September 2008, Hervé was elected senator of Ille-et-Vilaine.
