= History of Rennes =

French municipal history

Rennes, France, is the administrative capital of the French department of Ille-et-Vilaine. Before the French Revolution, prior to the integration of the Duchy of Brittany into the Kingdom of France, Rennes was the capital of the duchy, with the other historical capitals of Brittany's Ducal period being Nantes and Vannes. It has a long history due to its location at the confluence of two rivers and its proximity to the bordering regions from which arose various challenges to the borders of Brittany.

== Earliest history ==
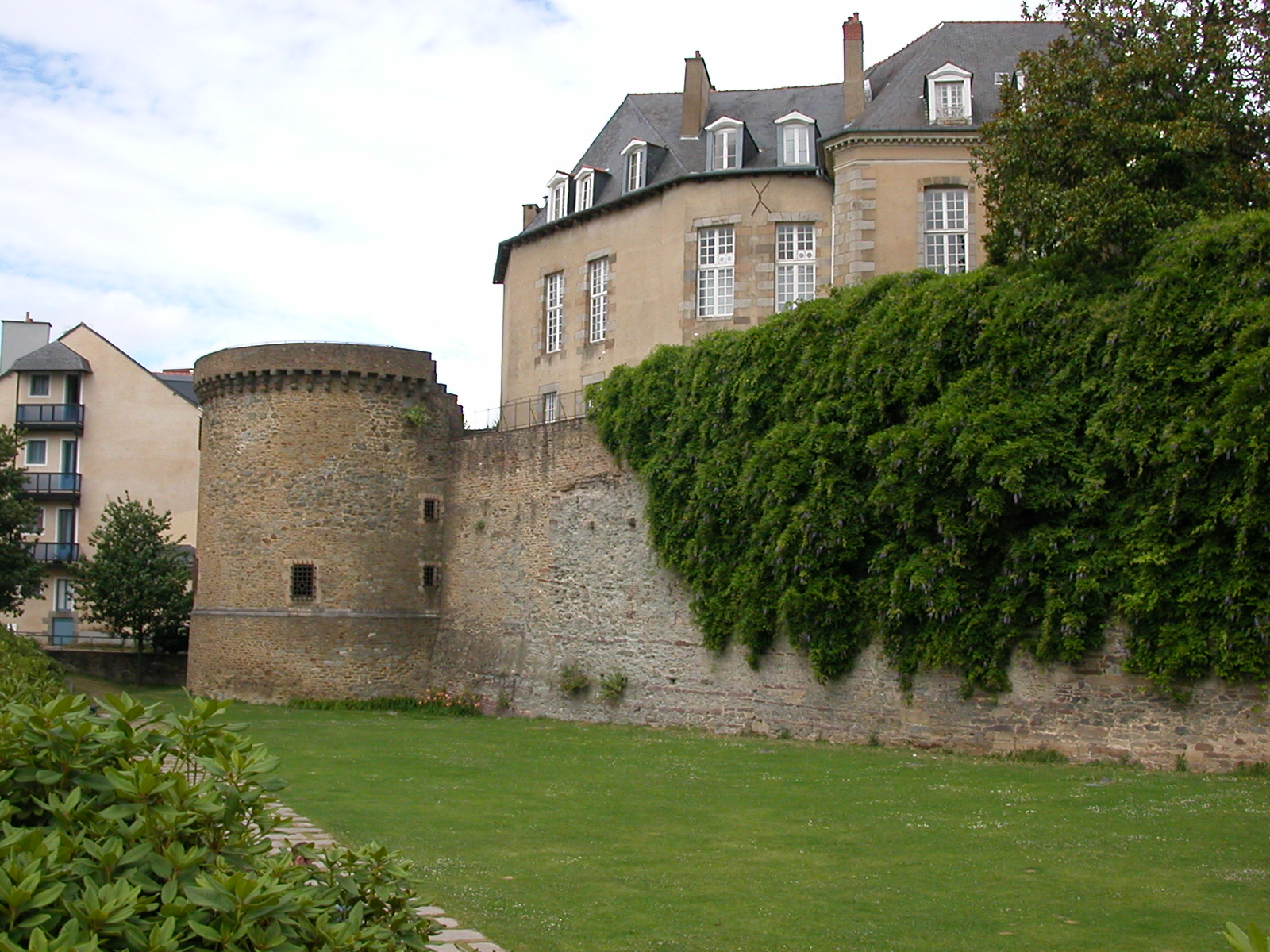
Remains of the Gallo-Roman City wall

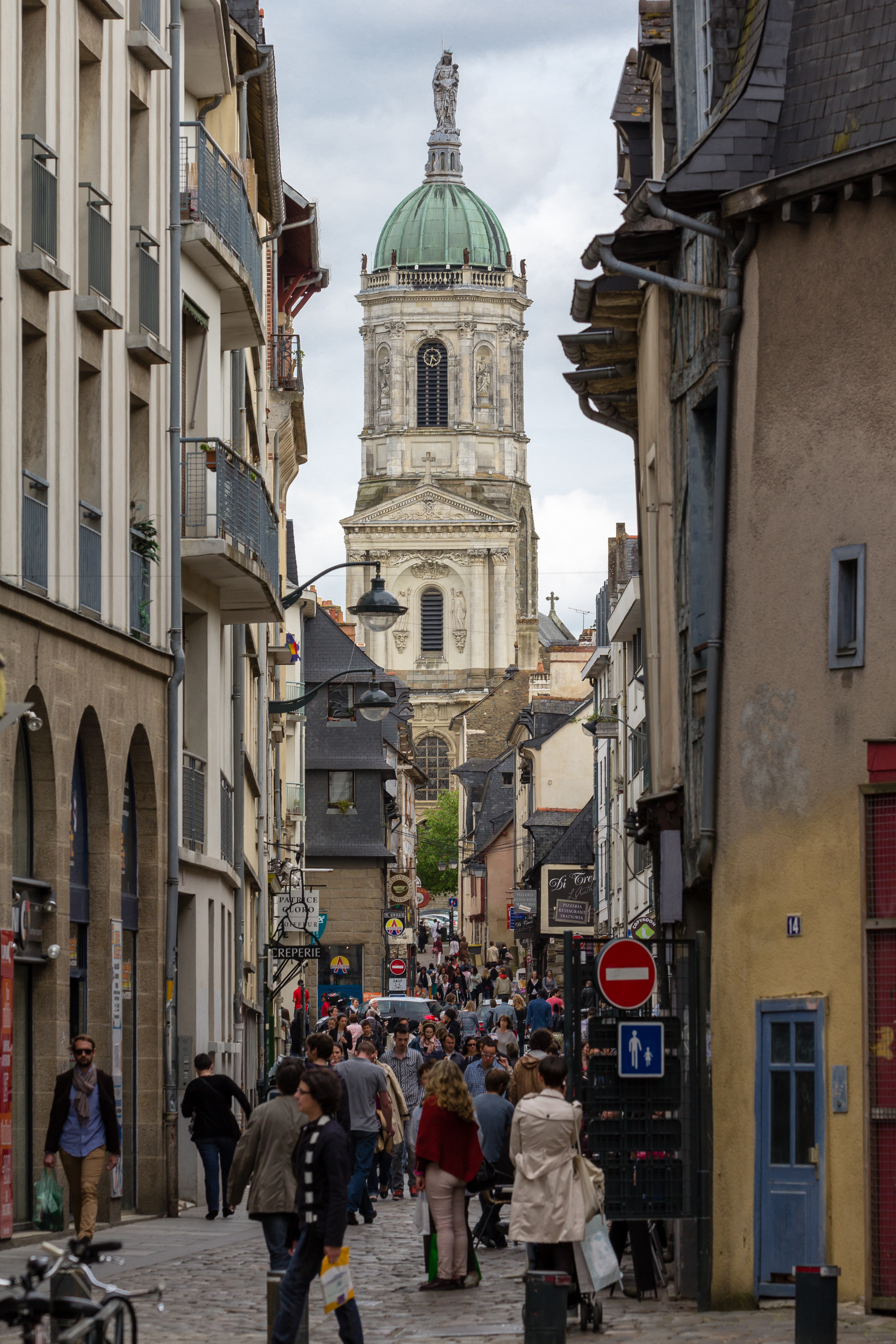
Old Street near Sainte-Anne Place

By the 2nd century BC the Gallic tribe known as the Riedones had occupied a territory in eastern Brittany roughly equivalent to the modern department of Ille-et-Vilaine and had established their chief township at the confluence of the Ille and Vilaine rivers, the site of the modern city of Rennes. Although the tribe's name - from the Celtic root red cognate with ride suggesting the Riedones were known for their horsemanship - would eventually default to their chief township ultimately yielding the name of the modern city of Rennes, the chief township of the Riedones was contemporaneously referred to as Condate a Celtic term for confluence which was utilised to designate numerous towns in ancient Gaul.

Early in the 1st century BC, the Riedones adopted the Greek and Roman practice of issuing coinage, adapting the widely imitated gold staters of Philip II of Macedon, in the characteristic Celtic coin metal alloy called billon. Without inscriptions, as the Celtic practice was, the Riedones coinage features a charioteer whose pony has a human head. Large hoards of their coins were unearthed in the "treasure of Amanlis" found in June 1835 and that of Saint-Jacques-de-la-Lande, discovered in February 1941. The Museum of Brittany at Rennes contains a large representative collection.

In 57 BC the Riedones joined the Gaulish coalition against Rome which was suppressed by Crassus's son Publius. In 56 BC Roman emissaries were held hostage by the Riedones causing Julius Caesar to intervene in Armorica suppressing the rebels, and the following year to cross the Channel to discourage further support of the Riedones by the Britons. In 52 BC, the Riedones responded to the call of Vercingetorix to furnish a large contingent of warriors.

== Roman era ==
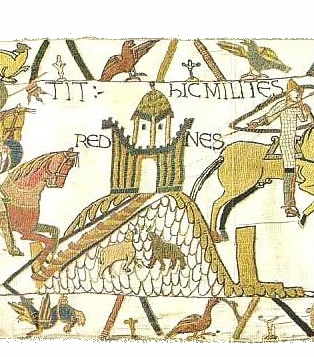
Rennes (Rednes), depicted in scene 18 of the Bayeux Tapestry

It was subsequent to its Roman occupation that the chief township of the Riedones became known as Condate Riedonum - alternately Civitas Riedonum - the second element, referring to the Riedones tribe who had founded it, ultimately yielding the name of the modern city of Rennes. The oldest known Rennais is Titus Flavius Postuminus, known to us from his steles found in Rennes in 1969. As indicated by his name, he would have been born under the Flavian dynasty, under the reign of Titus, i.e. between 79 and 81 AD. One of the steles tells us, in Latin, that he took charge over all the public affairs in the Civitas Riedonum. He was twice duumvir and flamen for life for Mars Mullo.

During the Roman era, the strategic position of the town contributed to its importance. To the west the principal Roman route, via Osismii, stretched from Condate Riedonum to Vorgium (modern Carhaix).

In 275, the threat of barbarians led to the erection of a robust brick wall around Rennes. Threatened by the danger of the peasant marauders designated as bagaudae in the final days of the Roman Empire in the 5th century, the Armorican peninsula, including Brittany and therefore Rennes, constituted the last stronghold of the western Roman Empire with the Armorican Romans invincible against Clovis I, who occupied most of Alamans, then the Visigoths.

The Holy See of Rennes had been established by 453, with a church having occupied the site of the current Rennes Cathedral since the start of the 6th century. One of the earliest bishops of Rennes, Melaine - who would become the city's patron saint - played an important role in the peace treaty between the Franks and the Armoricans in 497. He famously declared "Il faut faire la paix entre chrétiens" ("Peace must be made between Christians").

== Middle Ages ==
From the 5th century, Bretons occupied the western part of the Armorican peninsula, which was resultantly known as Brittany (i.e. Little Britain), while the Franks took the rest of Armorica. To contain the expansion and avoid Breton incursions, the Carolingians instituted a Breton March or frontier province, composed of the counties of Rennes, Nantes and Vannes. These marches were entirely absorbed by the Kingdom of Brittany in the 9th century, with Rennes becoming fully Breton in 851. Throughout Brittany's existence as an independent state - first as a kingdom and then as a duchy - Rennes generally was considered to be one of three cities acting as the territory's capital, the others being Nantes and Vannes, with Rennes Cathedral being the coronation site for the dukes of Brittany.

During the Breton War of Succession (1356–57), Henry of Grosmont (duke of Lancaster), cousin of the English king, laid siege to Rennes, but Bertrand du Guesclin penetrated the city and commandeered the resistance with ultimate victory. After nearly a year, Lancaster abandoned the English siege in 1357.

In 1491, the French army of Charles VIII, led by General Louis II de la Trémoille, unsuccessfully attacked Rennes. Mass graves of people who have died during the siege were discovered in 2021. Brittany having already capitulated elsewhere, Rennes alone resisted. The defenders of Rennes were determined to resist to the death, but the Duchess Anne of Brittany chose instead to negotiate. The resulting treaty of Rennes of 15 November 1491 dictated her marriage to Charles VIII and brought Brittany into the French kingdom. Anne zealously guarded Brittany's autonomy and the treaty promised that justice would continue to be dispensed according to practices, usages and customs maintained and observed heretofore. Furthermore, he promised the continuation of the Parlement of Brittany which met in February–April 1493, September 1494 and September 1495.

In 1534 Brittany became more fully connected with France and becomes the Province of Brittany.

In 1720, a major fire destroyed all timber framing houses in the northern part of the city. The rebuilding was made of stone, on a grid plan. The Hôtel de Ville was completed in 1743.

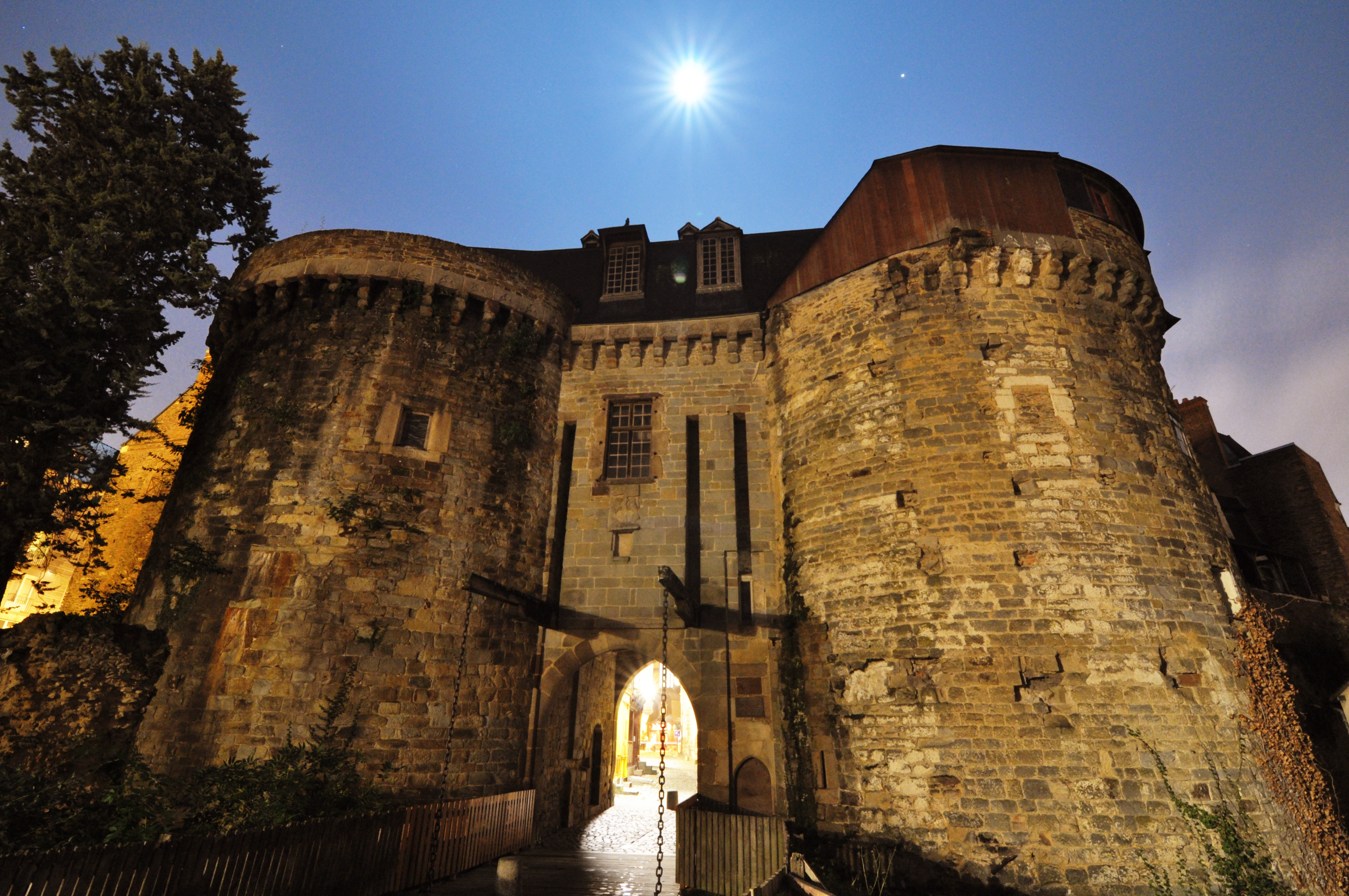
Mordelles Gates (Portes mordelaises), built in 1440, served as the principal entry to the town during the Middle Ages.

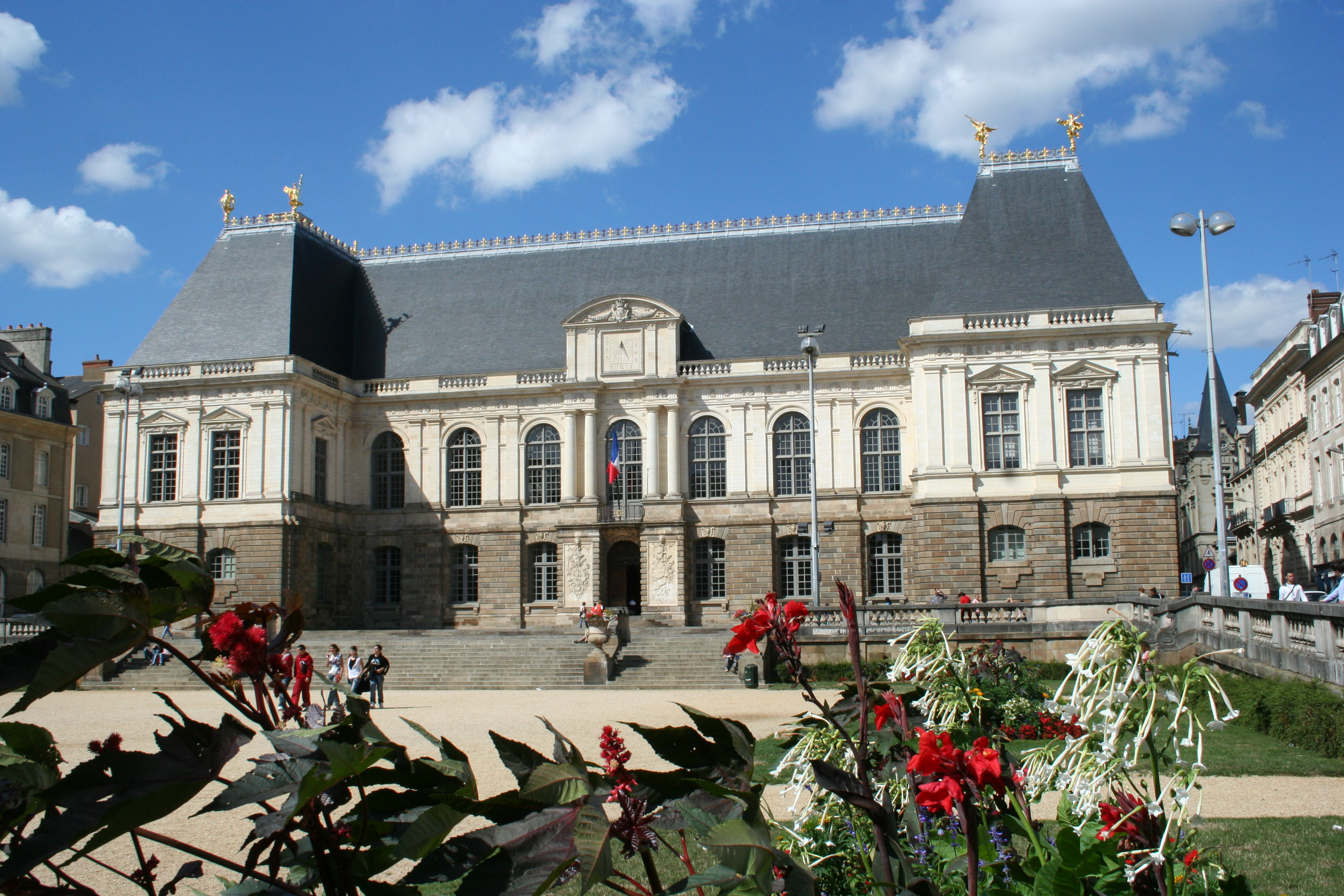
Parlement of Brittany, built 1618–1655.

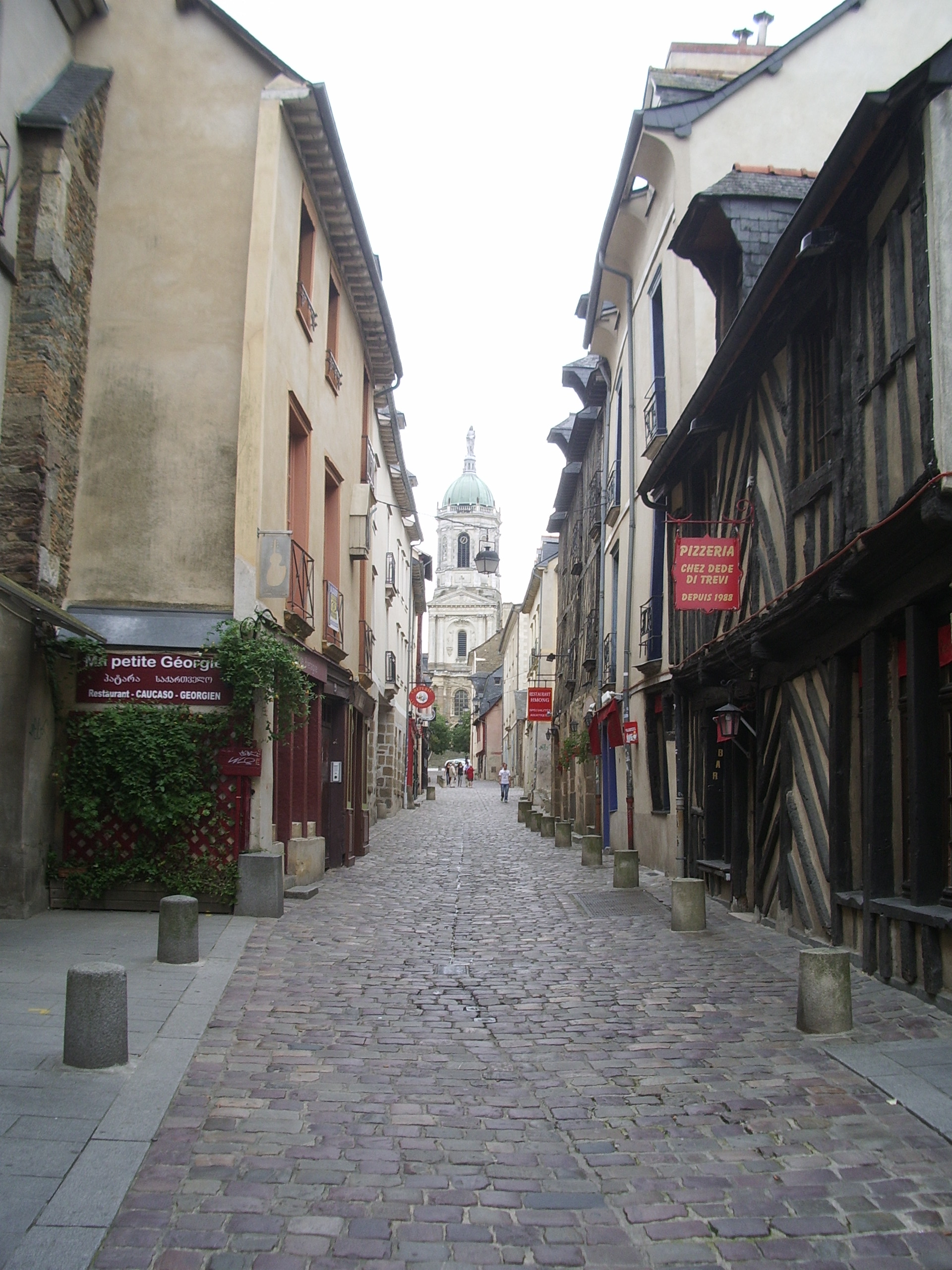
Old style streets in Rennes

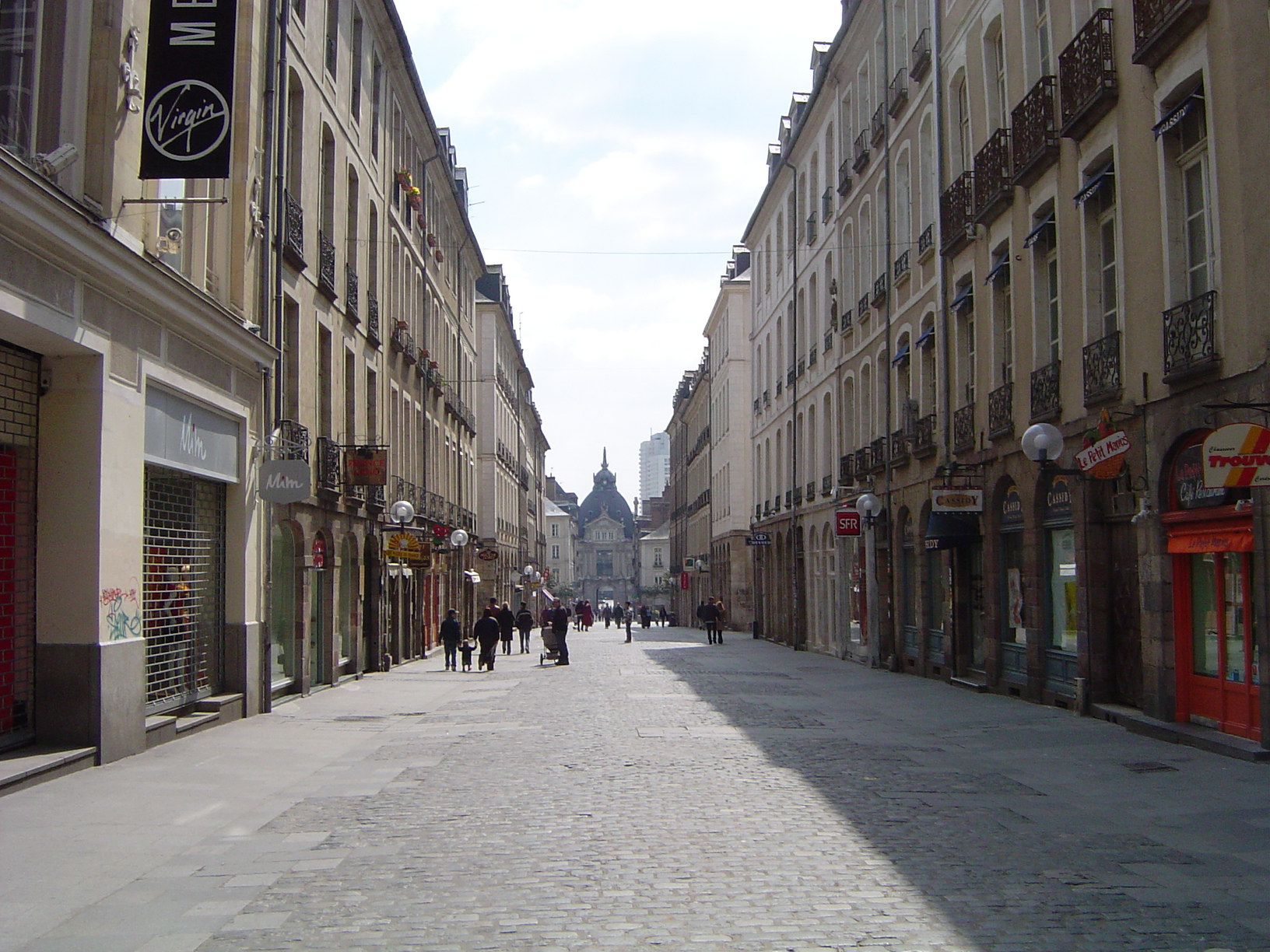
New style streets in Rennes, after the 1720s fire.

== 19th, 20th and 21st centuries ==
In 1857, Rennes railway station was built, which gradually led to the southward sprawl of the town. In 1899, Alfred Dreyfus' second trial in Rennes caused a national sensation.

With several faculties of the University of Brittany having transferred from Nantes to Rennes beginning with the law school in 1730, the full-fledged University of Rennes began operation in 1885 (although it was not so named until 1896 rather being referred to as a Conseil des facultés).

During the Second World War, Rennes suffered heavy damage from just three German aircraft which hit an ammunition train parked alongside French and British troop trains and near a refugee train on the yard: 1,000 died. The next day, 18 June 1940, German troops entered the city. Later, Rennes endured heavy bombing by the US and Royal Air Forces in March and May 1943, and again in June 1944, causing hundreds of deaths. Rennes contained a German transit POW camp and a POW hospital which contained many of the paratroopers captured on D-Day. Patton's army freed the capital of Brittany on 4 August, as retreating German troops blew up the bridges behind them, adding further damage. About 50,000 German prisoners were kept in four camps, in a city of only about 100,000 inhabitants at the time.

From 1954 onward, the city developed extensive building plans to accommodate upwards of 220,000 inhabitants, helping it become the second fastest-growing city in France, after Toulouse (1999 census).

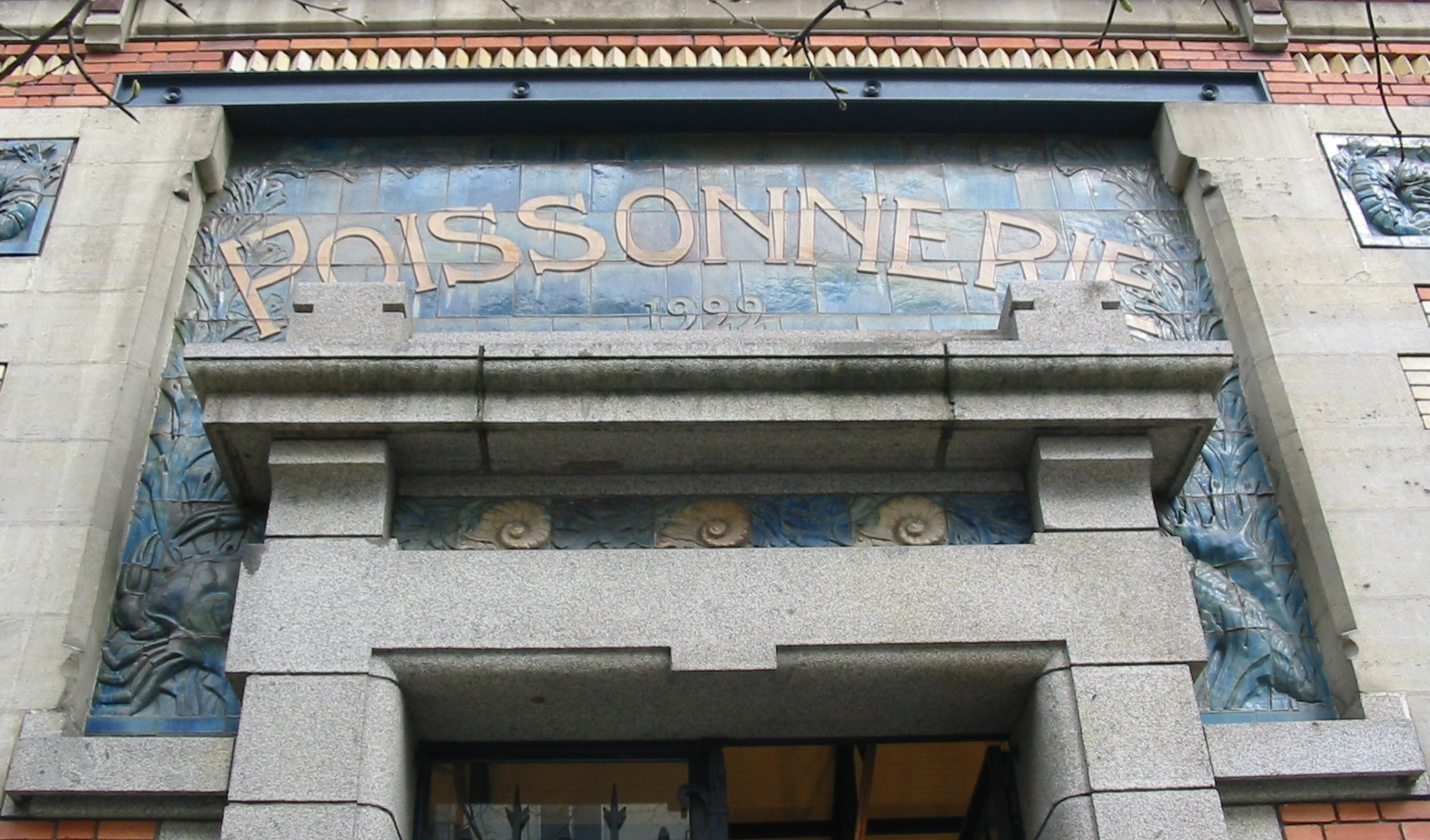
Entry to the former fish market at Les Halles Centrales, south of La Vilaine, from 1922. Now a contemporary art museum.

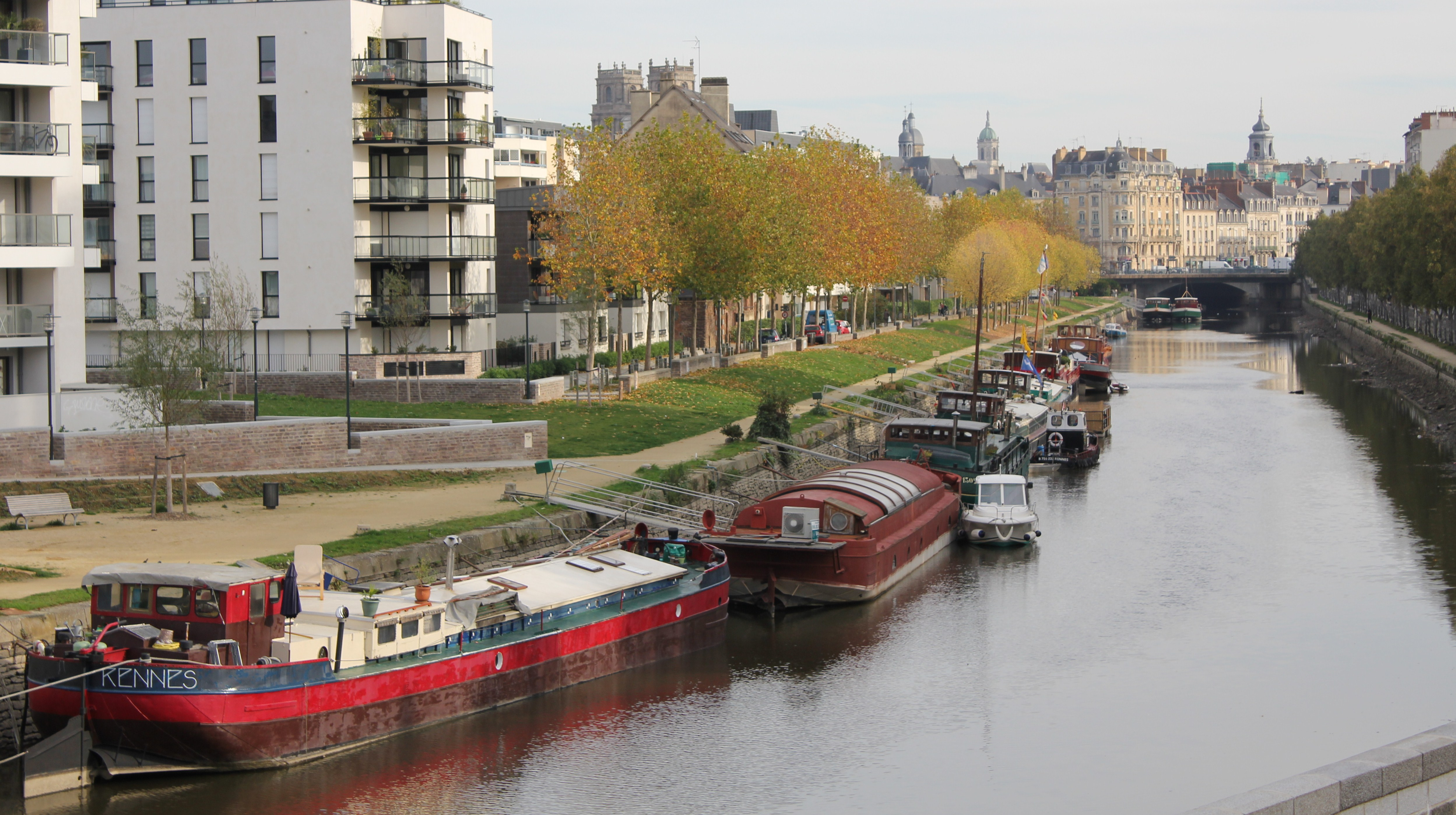
Banks of the Vilaine.

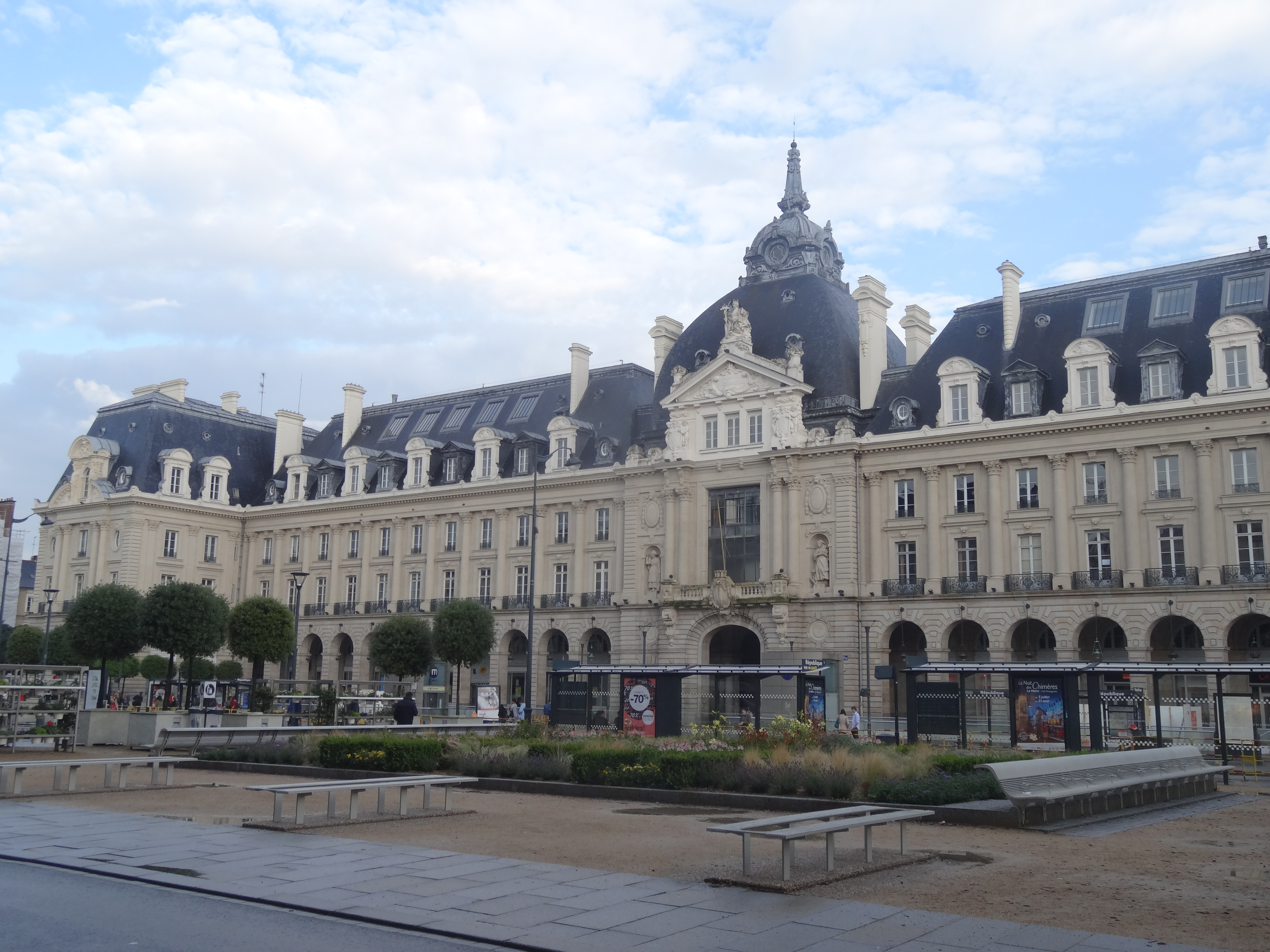
Le Palais du Commerce at Place de la République.

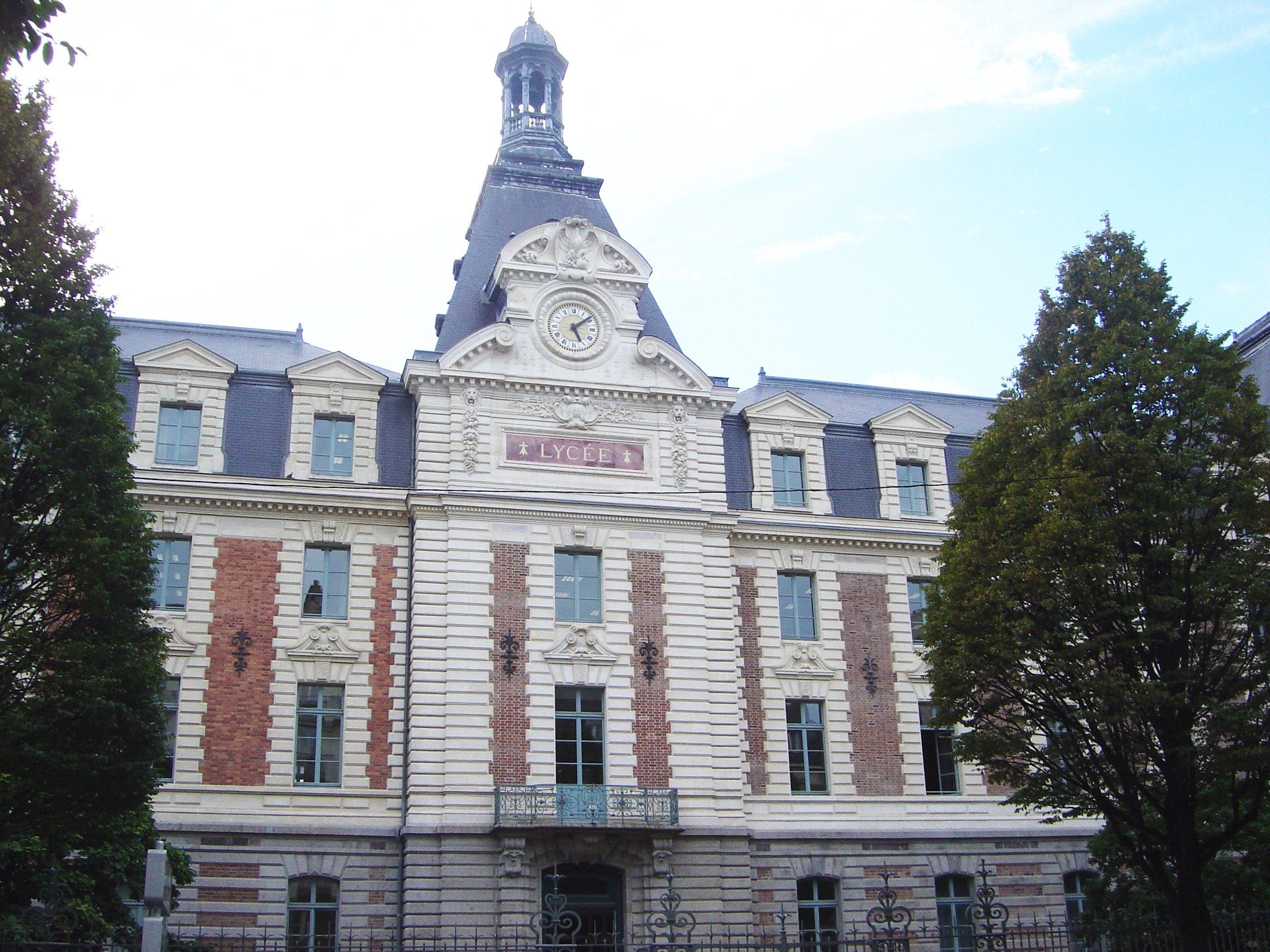
Lycée Zola, where Alfred Dreyfus' trial took place in 1899

== See also ==
- Timeline of Rennes
