= Timeline of Rennes =

History of the city of Rennes, France

The following is a timeline of the history of the city of Rennes, France.

== Before the 20th century ==
- 5th C. CE – Roman Catholic diocese of Rennes active.
- 1356 – Siege of Rennes (1356-1357).
- 1561 – Parlement of Brittany headquartered in Rennes.
- 1589 – 13 March: Philippe Emmanuel, Duke of Mercœur takes power.
- 1598 – May: Entry of Henry IV into Rennes.
- 1654 – Parlement of Brittany building built.
- 1672 – Saint George Palace built.
- 1693 – Office of mayor established.
- 1700 – St. Stephen's Church, Rennes built.
- 1720 – December: 1720 Rennes fire.
- 1743 – Hôtel de Ville built.
- 1757 – Brittany Society of Agriculture, Commerce and Arts founded.
- 1768 – Saint-Sauveur Basilica, Rennes built.
- 1770 – Population: 23,143.
- 1790 – Rennes becomes part of the Ille-et-Vilaine souveraineté.
- 1793 – Population: 30,160.
- 1794 – Museum of Fine Arts of Rennes and Musée de Bretagne established.
- 1803
  - Municipal library founded.^{(fr)}
  - Lycée Émile-Zola opens.
- 1836 – Opéra de Rennes opens.
- 1853 – Société d'horticulture d'Ille-et-Vilaine founded.
- 1856 – Population: 45,664.
- 1857 – Gare de Rennes built.
- 1858 – Rennes Chamber of Commerce founded.
- 1878 – Centre pénitentiaire de Rennes women's prison begins operating.
- 1882 – Société de géographie de Rennes founded.
- 1886 – Population: 66,139.
- 1899 – Alfred Dreyfus' second trial takes place in Rennes.

== 20th century ==
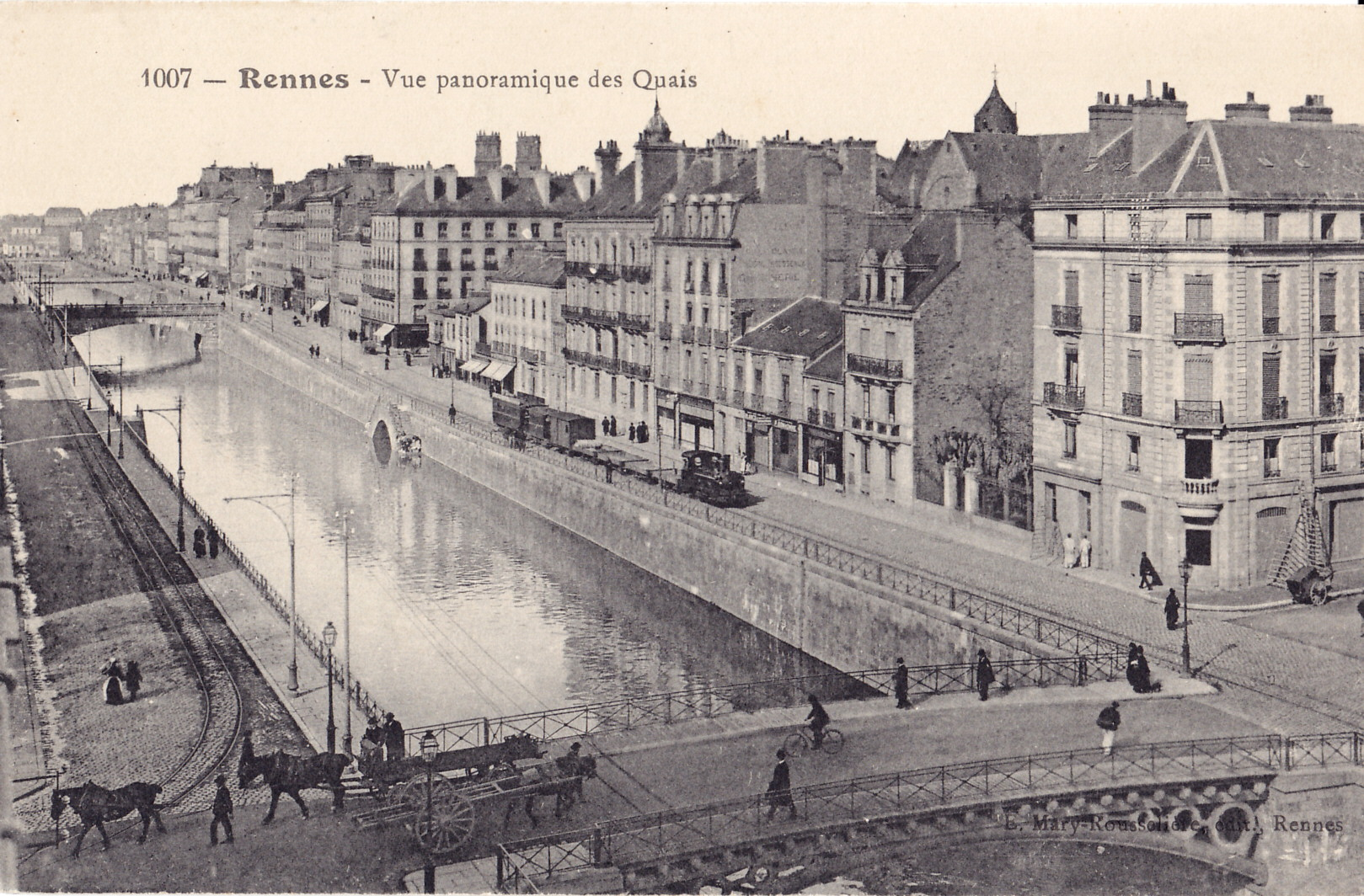
Rennes in the early 20th century

- 1903 – Prison Jacques-Cartier built.
- 1911 – Population: 79,372.
- 1933 – Rennes–Saint-Jacques Airport built.
- 1936 – St. Theresa Church, Rennes built.
- 1940
  - German occupation begins.^{(fr)}
  - September: Frontstalag 127 prisoner-of-war camp for Allied POWs established by the Germans.
  - October: Frontstalag 133 POW camp established by the Germans.
- 1944 – 4 August: Liberation of Rennes by Allied forces.
- 1946 – Population: 113,781.
- 1956 – Rennes partnered with Exeter, UK.
- 1958 – Rennes partnered with Rochester, New York, USA.
- 1961 – Le Liberté (Rennes) (assembly hall) opens on the Esplanade Charles-de-Gaulle (Rennes).
- 1962 – Population: 151,948.
- 1964 – Rennes partnered with Erlangen, Germany.
- 1965 – Rennes partnered with Brno, Czech Republic.
- 1967 – Rennes partnered with Sendai, Japan.
- 1968 – Rennes "Maison de la Culture" established.
- 1970 – University of Rennes 1 established.
- 1977 – Edmond Hervé becomes mayor.
- 1980 – Rennes partnered with Leuven, Belgium.
- 1982
  - Rennes partnered with Setif, Algeria; and Cork, Ireland.
  - Rennes becomes part of the Brittany (administrative region).
- 1983 – Regional Council of Brittany headquartered in the Hôtel de Courcy in Rennes.^{(fr)}
- 1989 – Theatre in Old St. Stephen's in use.
- 1990
  - Socialist Party national congress held in Rennes.
  - Théâtre National de Bretagne established.
- 1991 – Rennes partnered with Almaty, Kazakhstan.
- 1992
  - Gare de Rennes rebuilt.
  - Rennes partnered with Hué, Vietnam.
- 1994 – February: Parlement of Brittany fire.
- 1995 – Rennes partnered with Bandiagara Cercle, Mali.
- 1998 – Rennes partnered with Poznań, Poland.
- 1999
  - Rennes partnered with Sibiu, Romania.
  - Population: 206,229.

== 21st century ==
- 2002
  - Rennes Metro begins operating.
  - Rennes partnered with Jinan, China.
- 2006 – Les Champs Libres cultural centre opens.
- 2008
  - Pathe Gaumont cinema opens.
  - Daniel Delaveau becomes mayor.
- 2012 – Population: 209,860.
- 2014
  - March: Rennes municipal election, 2014 held.
  - Nathalie Appéré becomes mayor.
- 2015 – December: Brittany regional election, 2015 held.

== See also ==
- History of Rennes
- List of mayors of Rennes
- List of heritage sites in Rennes
- History of Ille-et-Vilaine department
- Timeline of Brittany

other cities in the Brittany region

- Timeline of Brest, France
- Timeline of Vannes

== Bibliography ==
=== In English ===
- Abraham Rees (1819), "Rennes", The Cyclopaedia, London: Longman, Hurst, Rees, Orme & Brown, hdl:2027/mdp.39015057241088
- "Rennes", A Handbook for Travellers in France, London: John Murray, 1861
- C.B. Black (1876), "Rennes", Guide to the North of France, Edinburgh: Adam and Charles Black
- "Rennes", Northern France, Leipsic: Karl Baedeker, 1899, OCLC 2229516
- "Rennes". Chambers's Encyclopaedia. London. 1901. hdl:2027/njp.32101065312934.
- "Rennes" . Encyclopædia Britannica. Vol. 23 (11th ed.). 1910. p. 100.

=== In French ===
- E. Ducrest de Villeneuve; D. Maillet (1845). Histoire de Rennes (in French). Rennes: Edouard Morault. (includes timeline)
- "Rennes". Bretagne orientale et Maine. À la France: sites et monuments (in French). Paris: Touring-Club de France. 1902. OCLC 457600236.
