= Amanlis =

Amanlis Amanli (Gallo) Amanliz (Breton)
- Commune
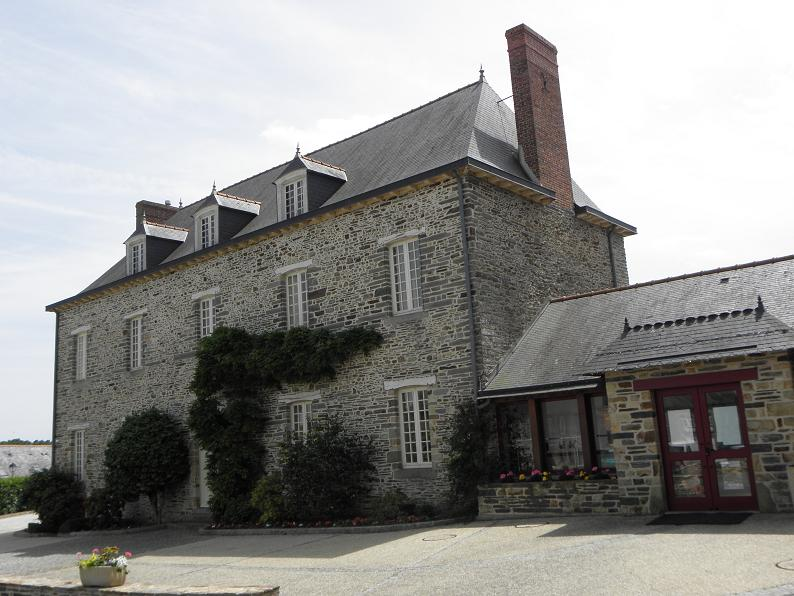
- Town hall
- Location of Amanlis
- Location within France Location within Brittany
- Coordinates: 48°00′26″N 1°28′29″W
- Country: France
- Region: Brittany
- Department: Ille-et-Vilaine
- Arrondissement: Fougères-Vitré
- Canton: Janzé
- Intercommunality: Roche aux Fées

Government
  - Mayor (2020–2026): Loïc Godet
- Area^{1}: 25.25 km^{2} (9.75 sq mi)
- Highest elevation: 93 m (305 ft)
- Lowest elevation: 25 m (82 ft)
- Population (2023): 1,768
  - Density: 70.02/km^{2} (181.4/sq mi)
- Time zone: UTC+01:00 (CET)
  - Summer (DST): UTC+02:00 (CEST)
- INSEE/Postal code: 35002 /35150
- ^{1} French Land Register data, which excludes lakes, ponds, glaciers > 1 km^{2} (0.386 sq mi or 247 acres) and river estuaries.

Amanlis (French pronunciation: [amɑ̃lis]; Breton: Amanliz; Gallo: Amanli) is a commune in the department of Ille-et-Vilaine in the region of Brittany in western France. The inhabitants of Amanlis are known as Amanlisiens.

The known history of Amanlis dates back to pre-Roman times, when the Riedones or Redones tribe of Gauls inhabited the area.

The primary products of Amanlis are agricultural. From the 16th to the mid-19th centuries, it was a center of production of sailcloth made from locally grown hemp.

Sites of interest include the parish church Saint-Martin-de-Tours and the Sainte-Anne-des-Bois chapel, which is dedicated to the patron saint of Brittany.

== Geography ==
Amanlis is located approximately 14 miles southeast of Rennes, the capital of Brittany, at the junction of highways D36 and D37. The town is on the banks of the River Seiche, a tributary of the Vilaine. The countryside is hilly and dotted with farms, orchards and small woods. The largest village in the commune after the town of Amanlis is called Néron.

== History ==
The name of Amanlis (formerly spelled Amanlix) is thought to come from Aman (butter) and Lez (court or courtyard); in other words, a place that produces butter.

The area around what is now Amanlis was inhabited by the Riedones or Redones tribe of Gauls during the Iron Age and the Roman period (roughly from the 5th century BC to the 5th century AD). Their capital was Condate (modern Rennes). Some 10,000 coins of the Riedones and the Veneti tribes were discovered in Amanlis in 1835; additional coins were found in the 1940s. Some of these coins have been preserved in the Museum of Brittany in Rennes and the Museum of History and Archeology in Vannes.

The first documentation of the existence of a Catholic parish in Amanlis dates from the 11th century. By 1197, according to the bishop of Rennes, the church property belonged to the Marmoutier Abbey, Tours. Sometime before 1375, the land around Amanlis was joined with that of Châteaugiron to the north. Under the feudal system of the time, all the inhabitants of Amanlis were subjects of the Baron of Châteaugiron.

By 1500, the farmers of Amanlis were raising dairy cattle, grains, apples, and crops used for textiles, such as flax and hemp. Amanlis became a center for the production of sailcloth from hemp for various kinds of ships in France and other European countries. This was a source of supplemental income for farmers and was supported by the French government throughout the 18th century and the first half of the 19th century.

In 1789, the old feudal system was dismantled, and Amanlis, along with all other rural parishes in France, became a commune with an elected mayor and municipal government. The commune of Amanlis was separated from Châteaugiron and became part of the canton of Janzé.

After the surrender of Napoleon to the British in 1815 and the return of peace to Europe, the exportation of sailcloth again became important to the prosperity of Amanlis. However, the local fabricators kept to their traditional methods of production, and they were unable to compete with mechanized techniques used by their competitors in Rennes, other cities in northern France, Great Britain and Belgium. Prices fell, and by 1870, the textile industry was in a serious downturn. Two other problems contributed to the declining fortunes of the commune. The first was the lack of good roads, which made it difficult to hold markets in Amanlis. The second was the inefficient configuration of typical farms, which were characterized by very small fields scattered about the countryside.

At the turn of the 20th century, the fields of hemp had been replaced by grasslands, the number of cattle doubled, and new species of apple trees were being planted. In addition, the production of grain was increasing due to mechanization. New means of transportation (rail, automobiles, bicycles) allowed people to travel to Rennes and beyond. Soldiers in World Wars I and II returned to Amanlis with new ideas and an interest in new ways of doing things.

As of 2020, the agricultural output of the commune was approximately 48% dairy products, 19% livestock, 16% poultry, and 16% plant-based.

== Language and Culture ==
The traditional culture of Brittany remains important to the inhabitants of the region. Before the introduction of compulsory education in French, the Breton language was widely spoken in the western part of the region, while the Latinate Gallo language was typically spoken in the eastern part around Rennes, which includes Amanlis. Gallo is currently spoken by some 28,000 people, mostly in rural areas.

== Population ==
The manufacturing of sailcloth after 1500 required significant manpower, and the population of Amanlis doubled from 1,000 to 2,000 within a hundred years. It continued to increase for some time, but a series of wars, bad harvests, famine and high taxes led to reduced production of sailcloth, and the population declined from 2,400 in 1672 to less than 2,100 in 1715. As a result of renewed demand for sailcloth in the early 19th century, the population increased to a high of 2,854 in 1836. In 1851, nearly 30% of the people in Amanlis were involved in some fashion in the production of sailcloth, from those who prepared the hemp and spun it into thread to weavers and merchants. However, from the mid-19th century on, the population began falling again, reaching a low of 1,337 in 1982. Since then, the population slowly increased to 1,768 as of 2023.

Historical population
Year	Pop.	±% p.a.
1968	1,376	—
1975	1,339	−0.39%
1982	1,337	−0.02%
1990	1,344	+0.07%
1999	1,442	+0.79%
2007	1,567	+1.04%
2012	1,611	+0.56%
2017	1,719	+1.31%
2023	1,768	+0.47%
Source: INSEE

== Administration ==
The current mayor of Amanlis is Loïc Godet, who was reelected on 28 May 2020 for a six-year term. The deputy mayors are Philippe Arondel, Régine Agnola, Hervé Saffray, Anita Breget, and Antoine Tabet.

== Education ==
Preschool and elementary classes are offered at the school Notre-Dame d'Amanlis.

== Transport ==
- Bus service to Rennes and nearby smaller cities is provided by the regional transportation service BreizhGo.
- The Gare de Rennes, a major railway station, provides high-speed rail service to Paris and other cities in France, plus regional service throughout Brittany.
- The nearest airport is Rennes–Saint-Jacques Airport, approximately 17 miles from Amanlis.

== Sites of interest ==
- Saint-Martin-de-Tours parish church. First mentioned in the 11th century, the church was rebuilt in the 16th and 17th centuries, with further modifications in the 18th and 19th centuries. The church was designated as an official "Monument Historique" in 1974.
- The Château of Amanlis (château du bourg), a large house and other property bought by count Jacques-Joseph Corbière in 1803. The house was built by Jean Couvroux around 1680 and renovated by Corbière and later by the de Talhouët family.
- The Château du Bois-Tilleul, former manor house of Bois-Farouge, rebuilt in the 18th century and remodeled in the 19th century.
- The Chapel of Saint Anne of the Woods (Chapelle Sainte-Anne-des-Bois), a pilgrimage destination near the village of Néron, consecrated in 1877 on July 26 (the feast day of Saint Anne, grandmother of Jesus and patron saint of Brittany). The pilgrimage is still conducted every July.
- The Sculpted House (La Maison Sculptée), created by artist Jacques Lucas beginning in 1968 on a property in the countryside near Amanlis. Basing his art on Breton monuments he had catalogued for the Ministry of Cultural Affairs, he decorated the building with paintings and sculptures in concrete.

== Gallery ==
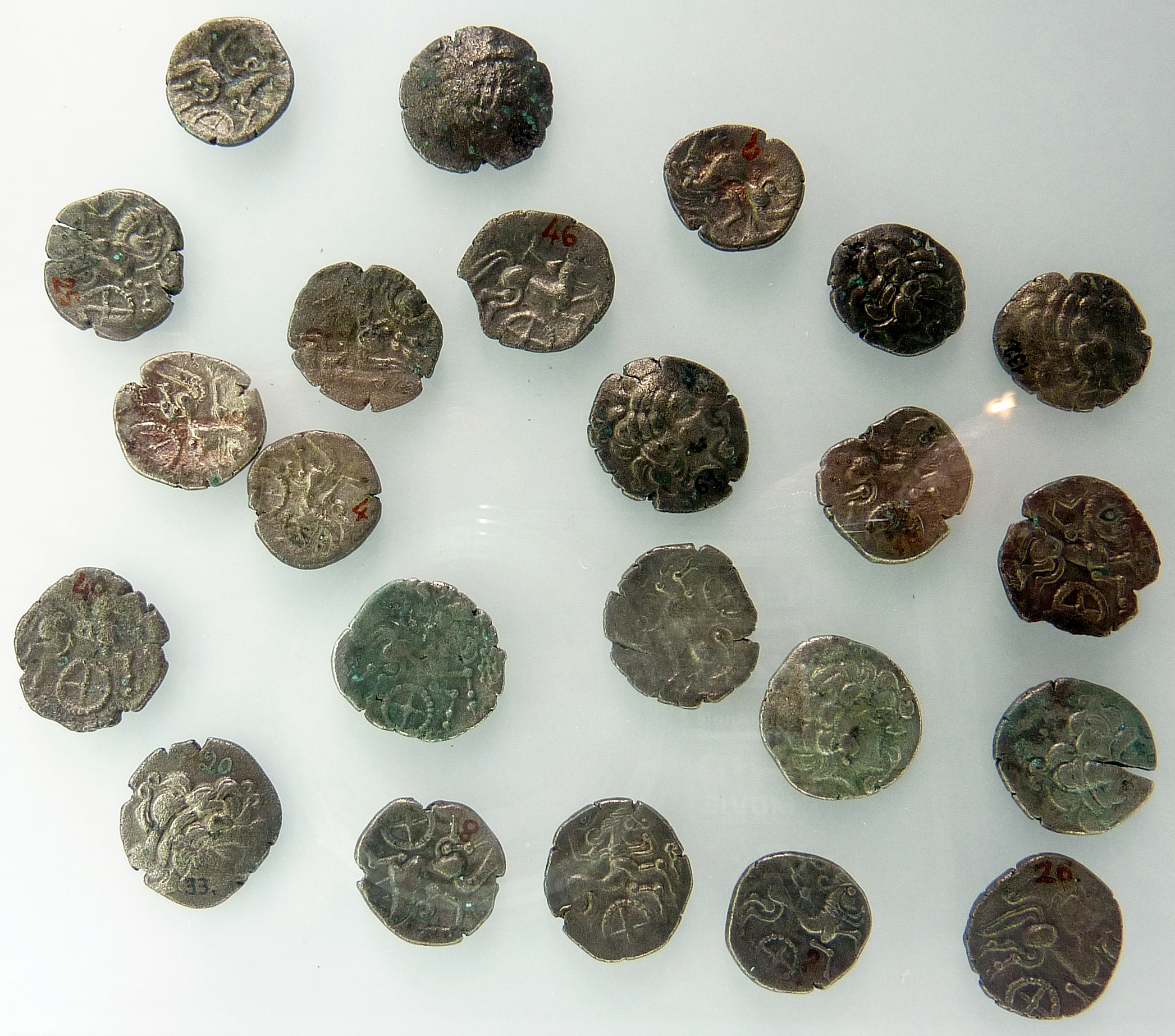
Coins of the Gallic Riedones and Veneti tribes

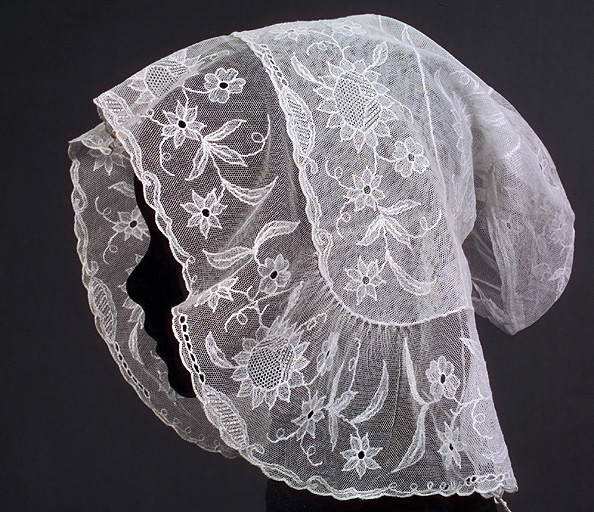
Coiffe (Breton-style embroidered lace cap of Amanlis)

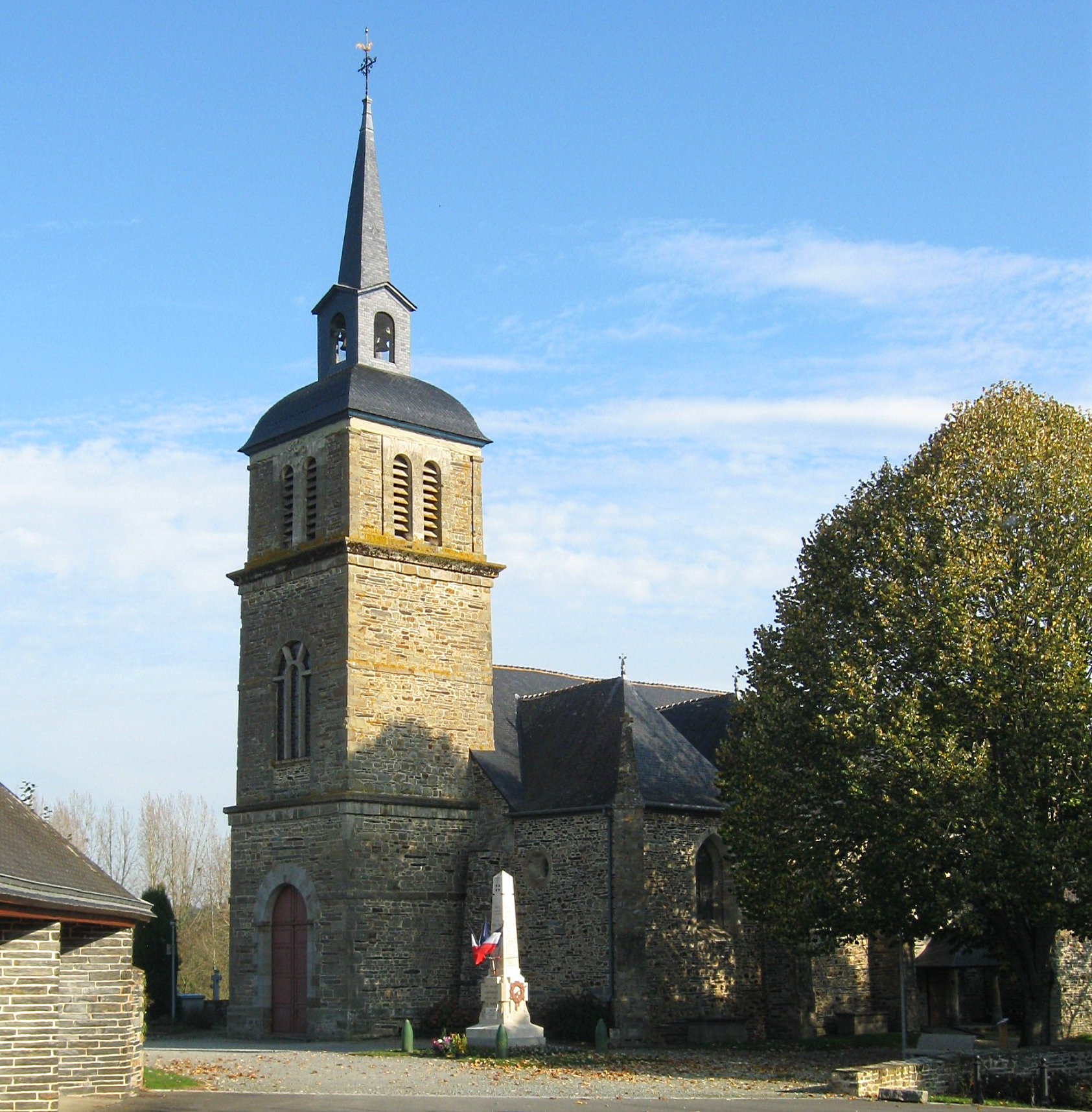
Saint-Martin-de-Tours Church

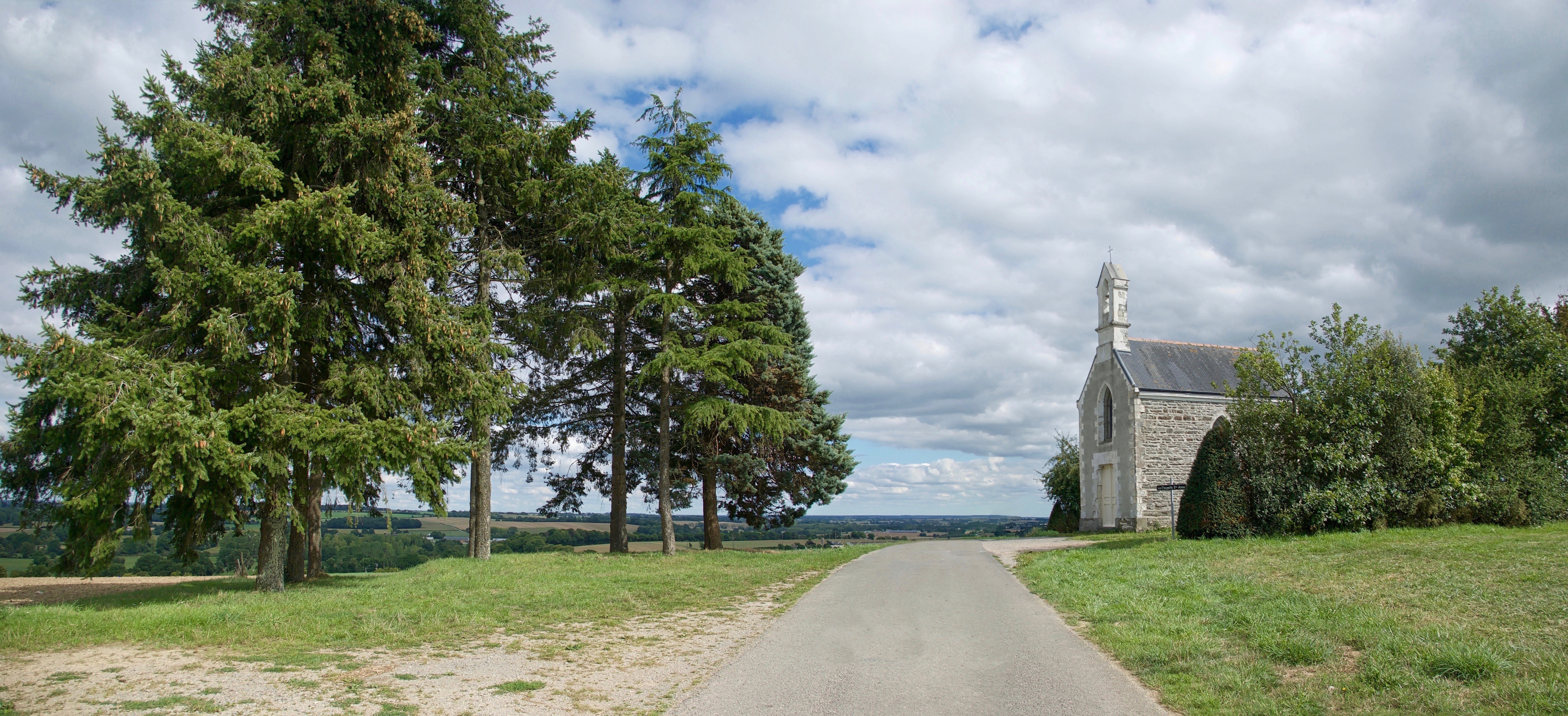
Chapel of Saint Anne of the Woods (Chapelle Sainte-Anne-des-Bois)

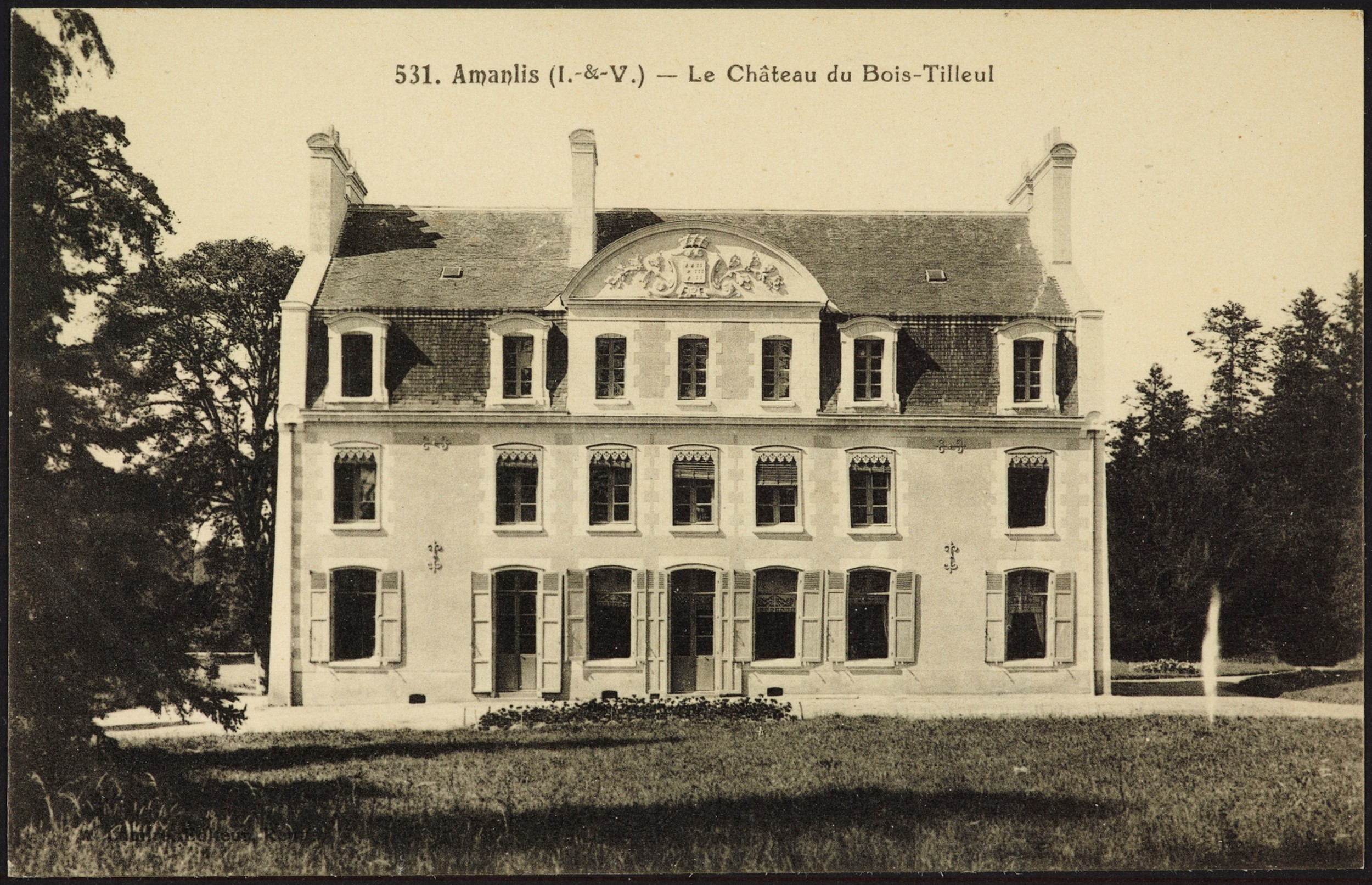
Château du Bois-Tilleul

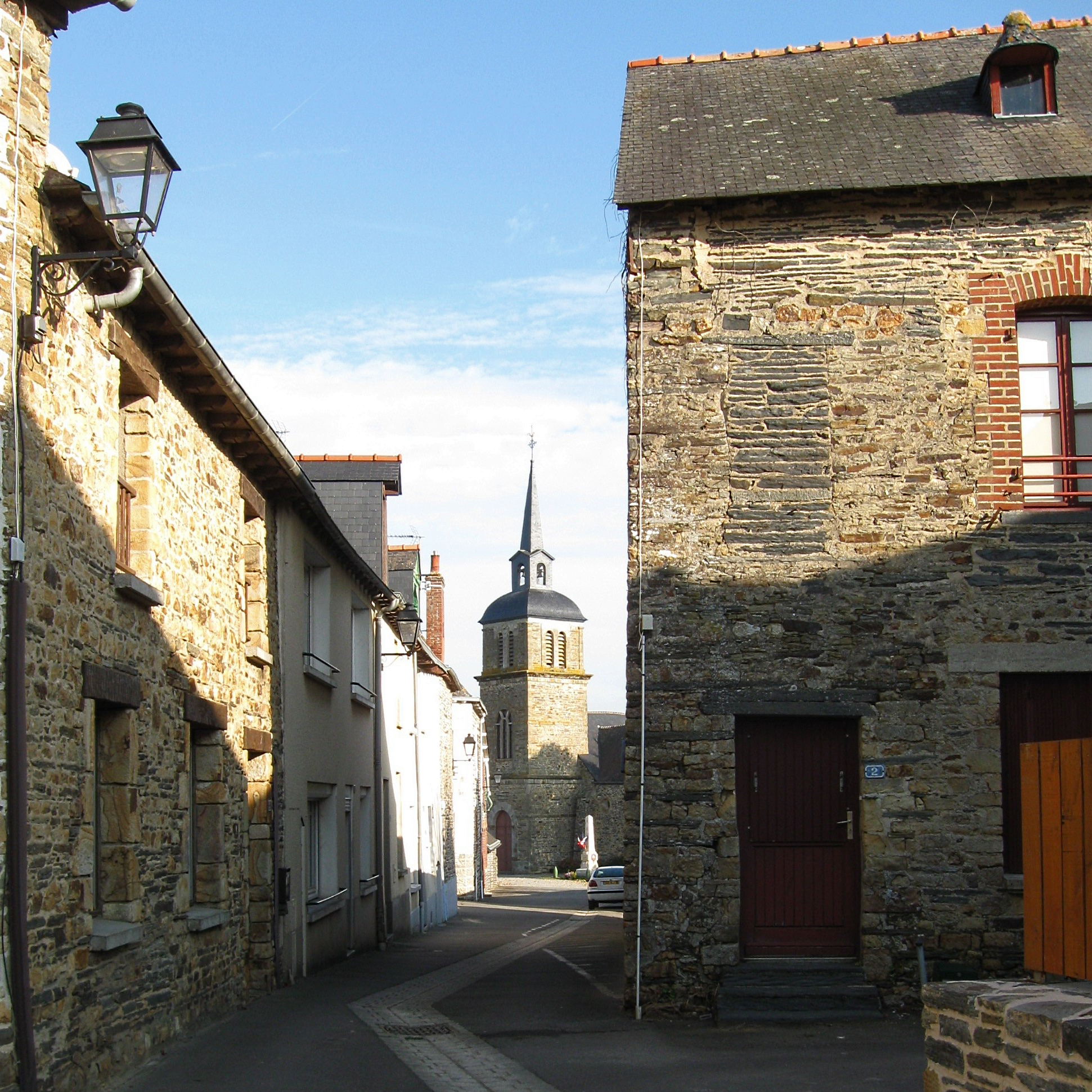
Rue des Dames

== Notable people ==
- Jacques-Joseph Corbière (1766-1853), lawyer born in Corps-Nuds near Amanlis and buried in Amanlis. He began his career in politics following the French Revolution and later served as Minister of the Interior under kings Louis XVIII and Charles X. In 1822 Louis XVIII conferred on Corbière the title of count, and in 1828 he was made a peer of France by Charles X. After the July Revolution of 1830, he refused to swear allegiance to the new king Louis Philippe I. His peerage was revoked, and he retired from public service.

== See also ==
- Communes of the Ille-et-Vilaine department
