= Condate Riedonum =

Gallo-Roman name for Rennes, France

- 1st century AD–4th century AD
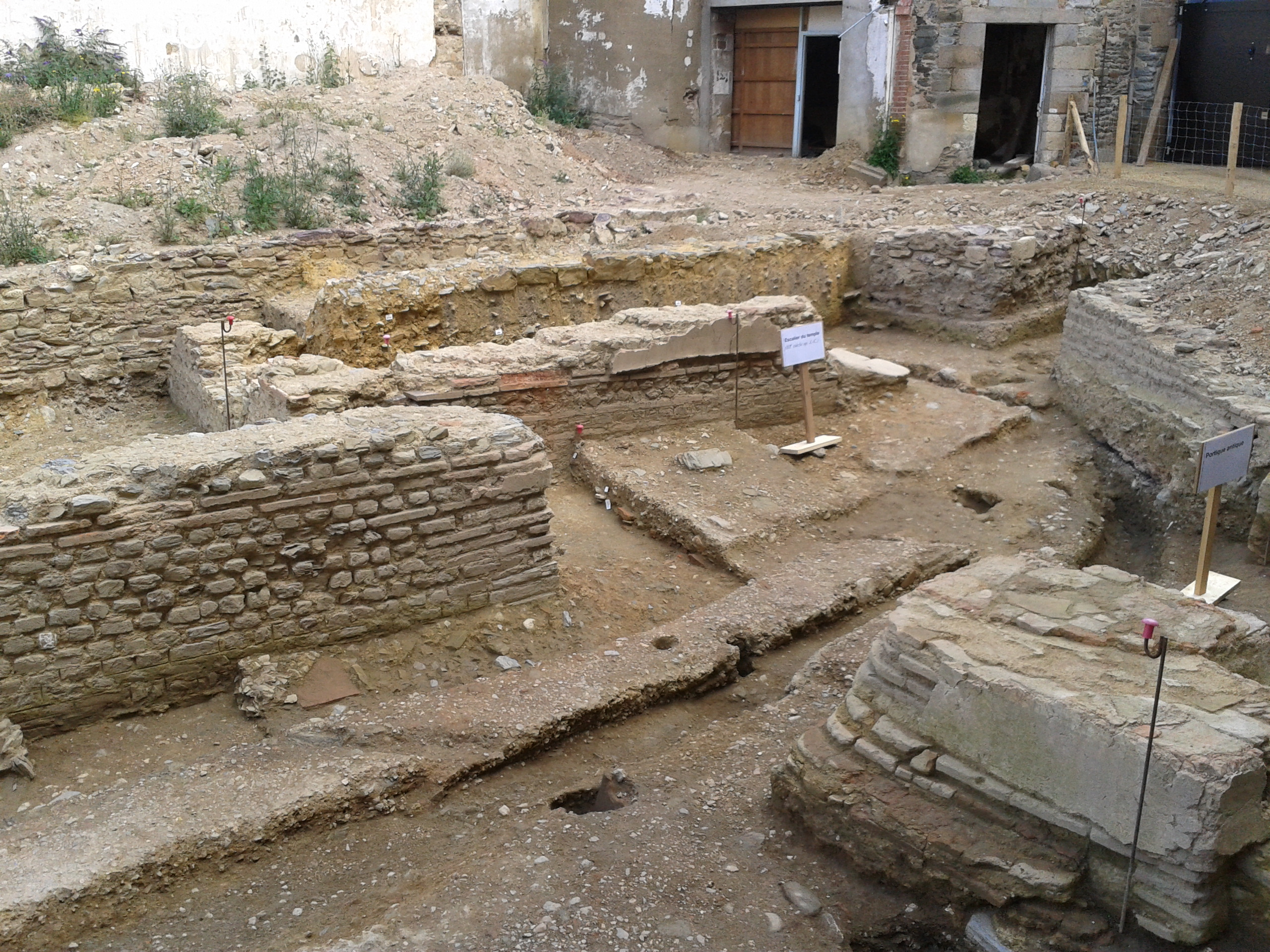
- Excavation of a temple in the Jacobin Convent's northern courtyard.
- Historical era: Ancient history
  - Established: 1st century AD
  - Disestablished: 4th century AD
- Today part of: Rennes, Brittany, France

Condate Riedonum is the Gallo-Roman name for the city of Rennes in France. It was the main city and capital of the civitas Riedonum in Roman Gaul.

== Etymology ==
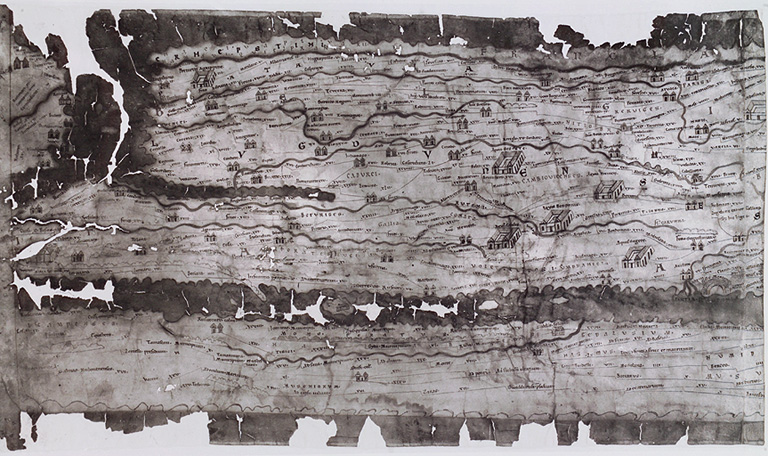
A fragment of the Tabula Peutingeriana showing Armorica

Condate is a toponym of Gaulish origin which refers to a river confluence. Riedonum comes from the tribe of the Riedones, of which Condate was the capital. This epithet was only used after the Roman conquest of the region.

== History ==
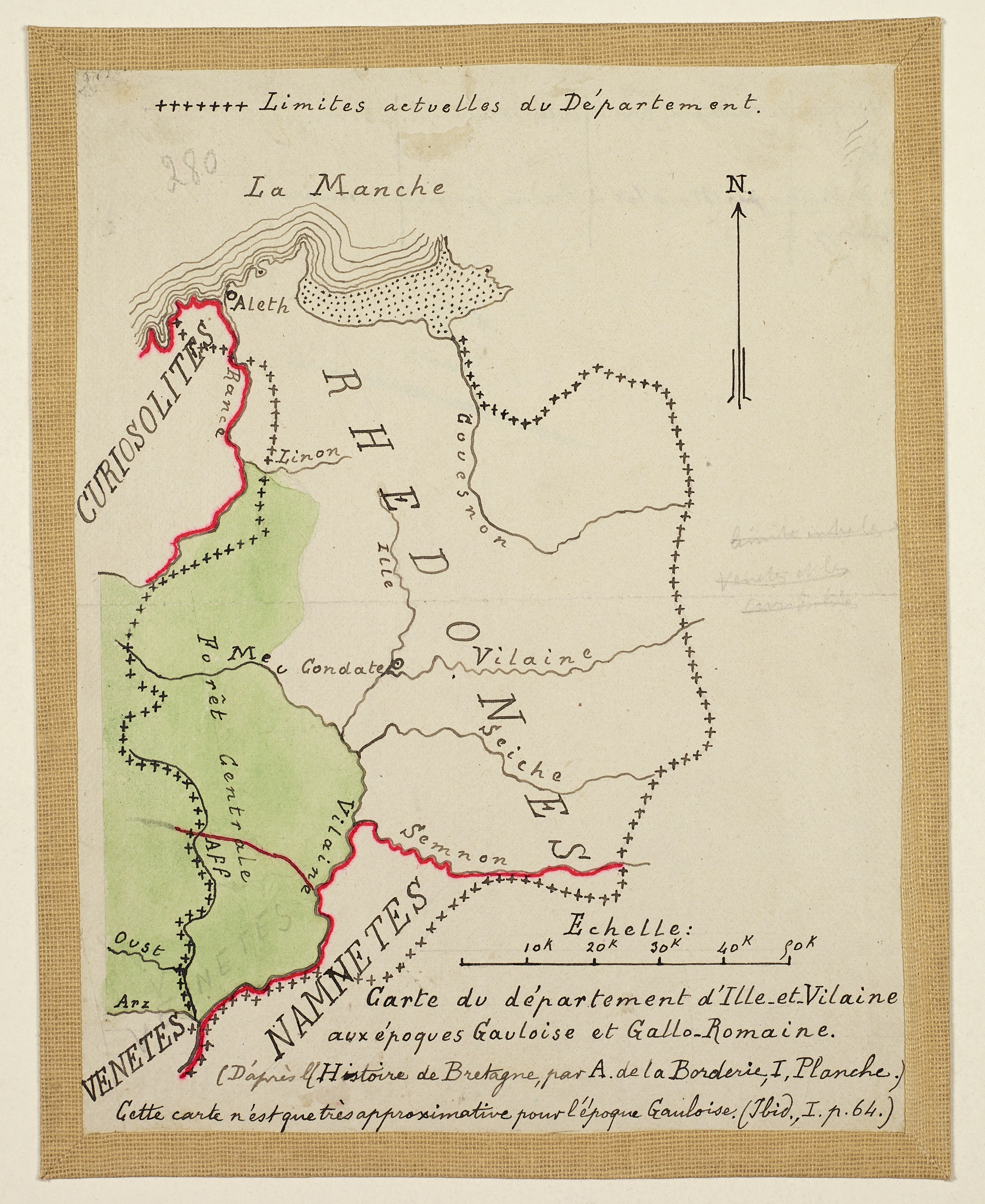
Map of Ille-and-Vilaine, with the city near the center and marked "Condate"

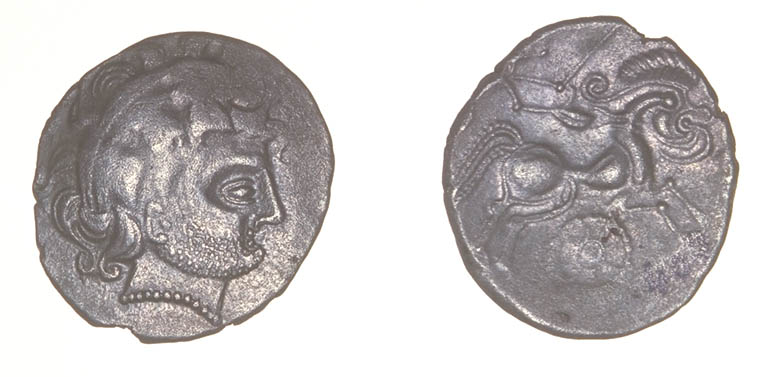
Riedones stater (silver and billon)

After the Roman conquest of Gaul, Condate Riedonum became the main city of its civitas. Its name is mentioned on both the Antonine Itinerary and Tabula Peutingeriana.

During the 1st and 2nd centuries AD, Pax Romana allowed the city to develop. But tensions within the Roman Empire between the 3rd and 4th centuries AD had repercussions on the economy and expansion of the city, now reduced to a core. Around this core, the medieval city was organized under the influence of Christianity. The city became Christian during the 6th and 7th centuries AD. The creation of a bishopric in Rennes led to new monastic settlements. Necropolises in the city were Christianized and new places of worship were built, including the Saint-Martin-des-Vignes church and Notre-Dame-en-Saint-Melaine abbey.

== See also ==
- History of Rennes
