= Mullo (god) =

Celtic deity associated with Mars

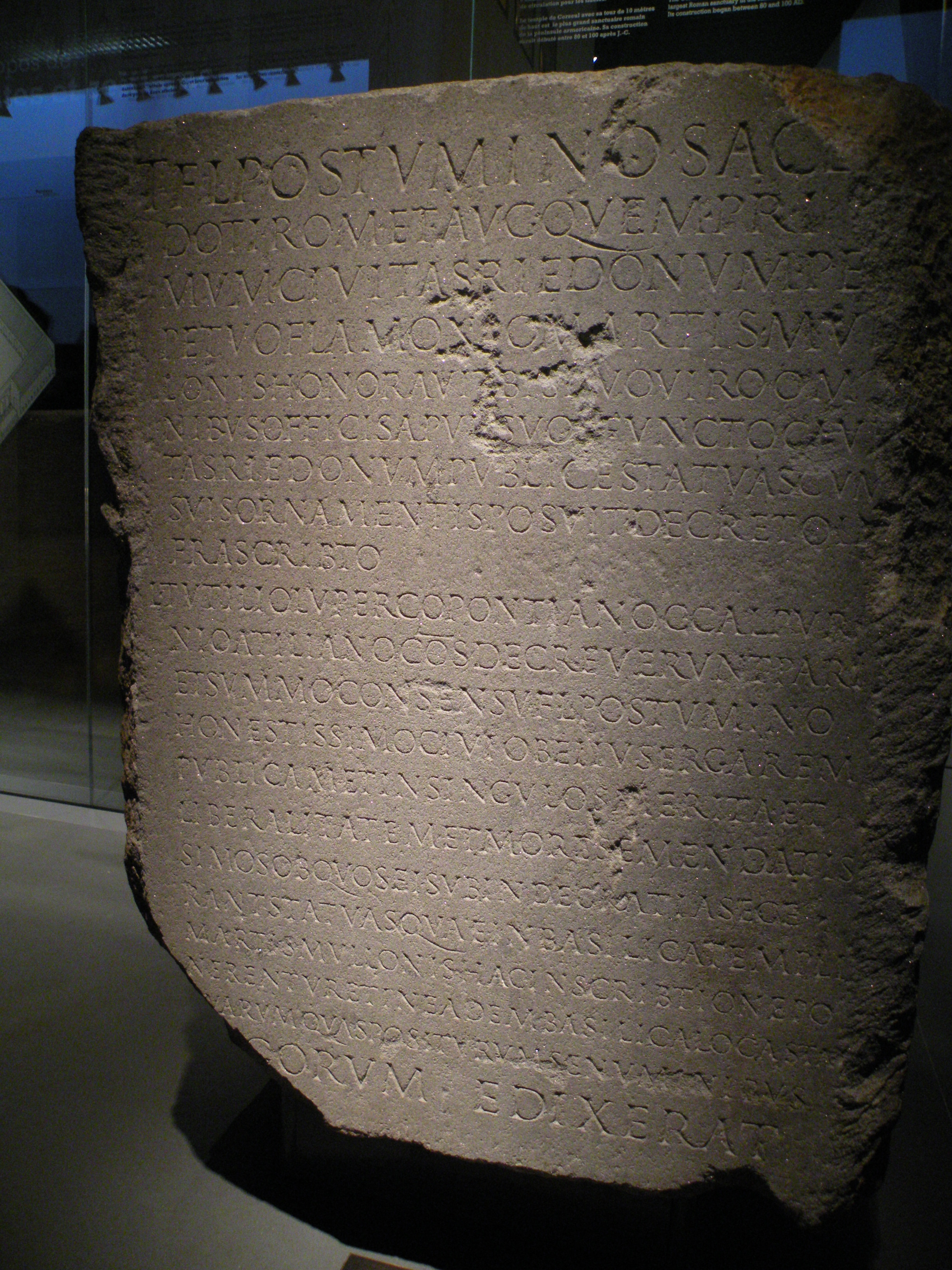
Stone dedicated to Mars Mullo (Rennes, Musée de Bretagne).

Mullo is a Celtic god. He is known from inscriptions and is associated with the god Mars in the form of Mars Mullo.

The cult of the god was popular in northern and north-western Gaul, particular in Brittany and Normandy. The word Mullo may denote an association with horses or mules (it is the Latin word for 'mule').

Mars Mullo had a circular temple at Craon in the Mayenne, situated on a hillock commanding a confluence of two rivers. An inscription at Nantes reflects the presence of a shrine there. An important cult centre must have existed at Rennes, the tribal capital of the Redones; inscriptions there refer to the one-time presence of statues and to the existence of an official public cult. Town magistrates were instrumental in setting up urban sanctuaries to Mullo in the 2nd century AD. At Allonnes, Sarthe a shrine was set up to Mars Mullo as a healer of afflictions of the eye. His importance is suggested by his link with Augustus on a dedicatory inscription. Pilgrims visited the shrine offered numerous coins to the god, along with votive images of the afflicted parts of their bodies, the eye problems clearly manifest.
