= Jacques-Joseph Corbière =

French lawyer

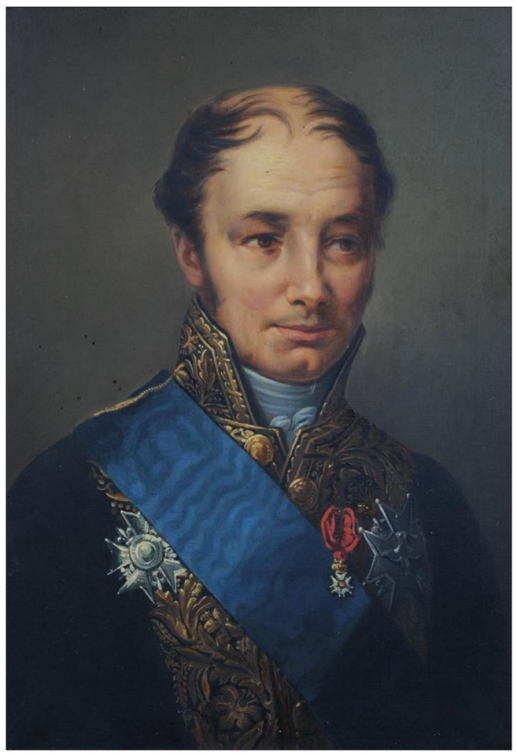
- Born: Jacques Joseph Guillaume François Pierre Corbière; 22 May 1766; Amanlis, near Rennes, Ille-et-Vilaine, France
- Died: 12 January 1853 (aged 86); Rennes, Ille-et-Vilaine, France
- Occupations: Lawyer, politician
- Known for: Minister of the Interior

Jacques Joseph Guillaume François Pierre, comte de Corbière (22 May 1766 – 12 January 1853) was a French lawyer who became Minister of the Interior. He was intolerant of liberalism and a strong supporter of the church.

== Early years ==
Jacques Joseph Guillaume François Pierre Corbière was born in Amanlis, near Rennes, Ille-et-Vilaine, on 22 May 1766. (Note: Another source says Corbière was born in Corps-Nuds, Ille-et-Vilaine, a few kilometers east of Amanlis. This may have been where his birth was registered.) He was from a family of laborers. He was at first destined to become a priest, but chose to study law and was admitted to the bar in Rennes. After the French Revolution he became commissioner of the Directory for the municipal administration of Rennes. On 25 Germinal in the year V Corbière was elected deputy for Ille-et-Vilaine in the Council of Five Hundred. He did not play a notable role in the council.

Corbière was charged as a lawyer with managing the estate of Isaac René Guy le Chapelier, president of the National Constituent Assembly, who had died by the guillotine in 1794. On 10 Nivôse in the year VIII he married le Chapelier's widow, Marie-Esther de la Marre, said to be the most beautiful woman in Rennes. She was also richly endowed by her brother, Mathurin de la Marre. Corbière himself was described as ugly, lame, and with his head buried in the shoulders. The brilliant match helped advance his career, and under the First French Empire he became president of the general council of Ille-et-Vilaine.

== Bourbon Restoration ==
After the fall of the Empire, Corbière became a royalist. On 22 August 1815 he was elected to the Chamber of Deputies as representative for the Ille-et-Vilaine department. He sat on the right, beside Jean-Baptiste de Villèle. He was reelected on 4 October 1816. He was appointed Dean of the Faculty of Law in Rennes, and on 20 September 1817 he was again reelected. He took a consistently conservative position. After the assassination of Charles Ferdinand, Duke of Berry. he said that "the way to have good deputies is to have a royalist ministry and censored newspapers."

On 21 December 1820 Corbière was made a Minister of State and president of the Royal Council of Public Education. He wanted to give the church the leading role in education. In face of growing liberal and irreligious views among college students, Corbière suppressed the École Normale in Paris and other faculties. He resigned in September 1821 due to opposition to the Simeon-Pasquier cabinet, and returned to Brittany to campaign for the next election. The majority of those elected were opposed to the cabinet, which was dissolved. On 14 December 1821 Villèle was charged with forming a government. Corbière was given the Interior portfolio, and was made a count by the king.

Corbière fired many personnel, fought liberal education and freedom of the press, tried several times to reestablish censorship, and in 1824 tried to buy all the ultra-royalist newspapers, which gave his department difficulty but were hard to prosecute. He was able to buy the Drapeau blanc, the Gazette de France, the Journal de Paris and other papers, but could not acquire the Quotidienne. M. Michaud had four twelfths of the shares and refused to sell. Michaud was taken to court, but won on appeal. Corbière dissolved the National Guard of Paris in 1827. He lost his portfolio when the cabinet resigned on 4 January 1828. The same day he was made a Minister of State, member of the privy council, knight of the Order of the Holy Spirit and a peer of France.

== Last years ==
Corbière refused to give swear allegiance to Louis Philippe I after the July Revolution of 1830, and left the chamber of peers. He retired to Brittany, where he became a passionate collector of old editions of the classics. Corbière died in Rennes on 12 January 1853. He was aged 86.

== Sources ==
- "Liste des ministres chargés de l'Éducation nationale et de leurs différentes appellations depuis 1802 jusqu'à nos jours". IFE.
- Robert, Adolphe; Couchy, Gaston (1891). "CORBIÈRE (Jacques Joseph Guillaume François Pierre)". Dictionnaire des Parlementaires Français comprenant tous les membres des Assemblées Françaises et tous les Ministres Français depuis le 1er mai 1789 jusqu'au 1er mai 1889. Bourloton.
