= Les Champs Libres =

French library and cultural center

Coordinates: 48.1050°N 1.6750°W

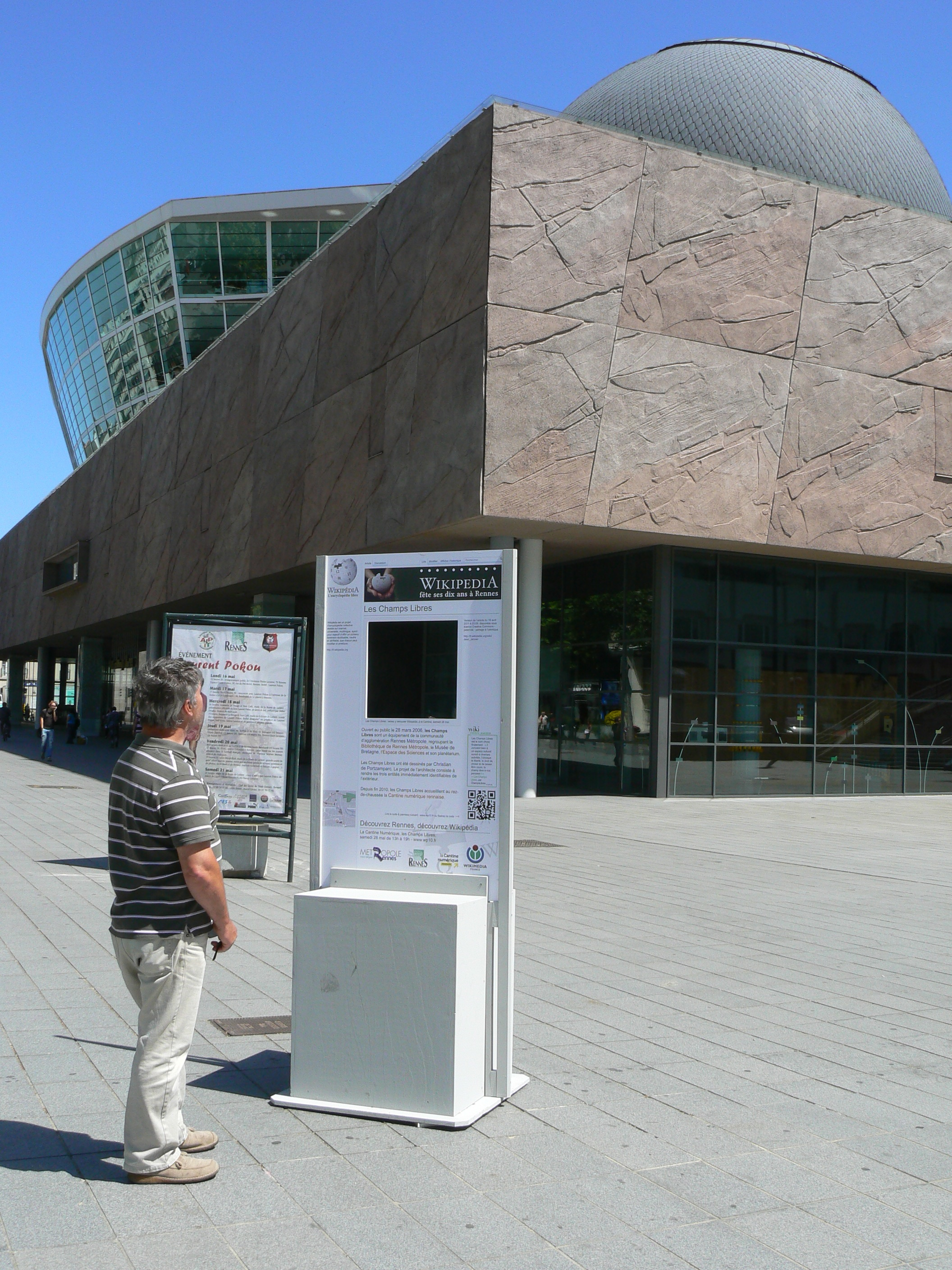
Les Champs Libres

Les Champs Libres (literally The Free Fields) is a cultural center in Rennes, France hosting the Library of Rennes Métropole, the Museum of Brittany, the Espace des sciences (and its planetarium), and the Cantine numérique rennaise. There are also a conference hall and an exhibition room.

Les Champs Libres opened in 2006, and is located in the center of Rennes near the railway station. The building was designed by the architect Christian de Portzamparc.

== See also ==
- List of libraries in France
