= Museum of Brittany =

Museum in Rennes, France

- Musée de Bretagne
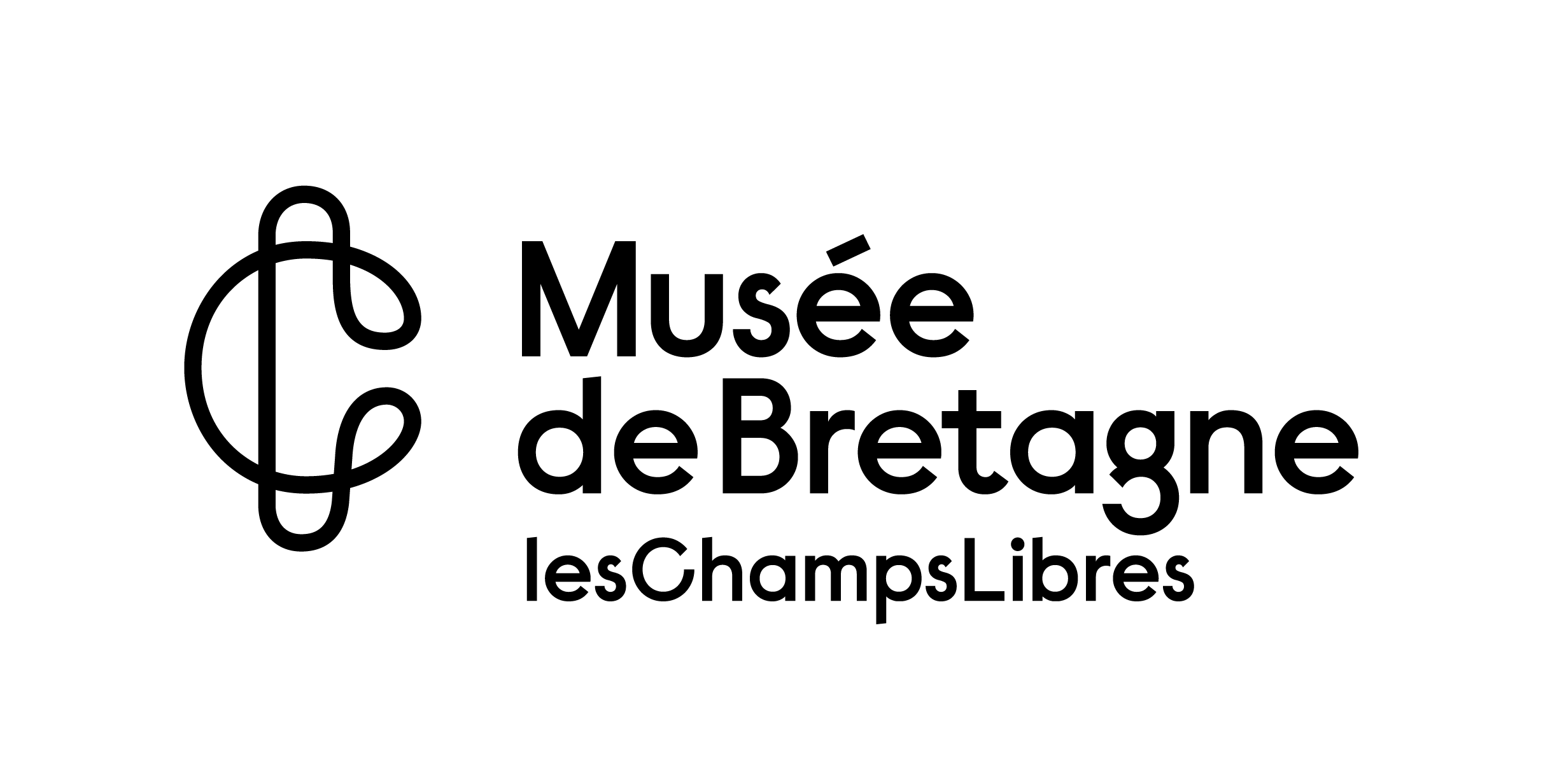
- Established: 1794
- Location: Les Champs Libres, Rennes, France
- Coordinates: 48°06′18″N 1°40′29″W
- Type: Ethnographic museum, local history
- Accreditation: Museum of France
- Director: Céline Chanas
- Architect: Christian de Portzamparc
- Website: musee-bretagne.fr
- Location of Museum of Brittany

The Brittany Museum (French: Musée de Bretagne) is a social history museum located in the Champs Libres cultural centre of Rennes, France. Originally structured as an archeology and ethnology museum, it is now a museum of regional history and society – focusing on the conservation, study, and presentation of the history of Brittany and Breton heritage from prehistory to the present day.

The provenance of the first items in the collections are from confiscations in 1794 during the French Revolution. The museum has been located in various places over time, notably housed alongside the Museum of Fine Arts of Rennes since 1815 in what was later named the Palais universitaire de Rennes. it moved to its present site in 2006.

== Collection ==
The current collection consists of over 600,000 objects and documents, of which more than 400,000 are photographic negatives and prints. The collections are co-managed with the local ecomuseum – the Écomusée de la Bintinais.

Notable permanent collections include numismatic (of ~35,000 coins, medals and tokens), ethnographic (particularly featuring clothes and furniture), and printed works (drawings, prints, posters, maps and plans, postcards, prints and photographs - building on the foundational collection of the Christophe-Paul de Robien).

The museum also houses a substantial collection of works related to Alfred Dreyfus and his 1899 trial (known as the Dreyfus affair) – which was held in the nearby Lycée de Rennes (now the Lycée Émile-Zola de Rennes). Following a temporary exhibition in 1973, Jeanne Lévy, daughter of Alfred Dreyfus, made a large donation which was subsequently increased by other family-donations and purchases. The collection now includes 6,800 items including significant amounts of personal correspondence.
