= Hôtel de Ville, Rennes =

Monuments historiques in Rennes, France

Hôtel de Ville
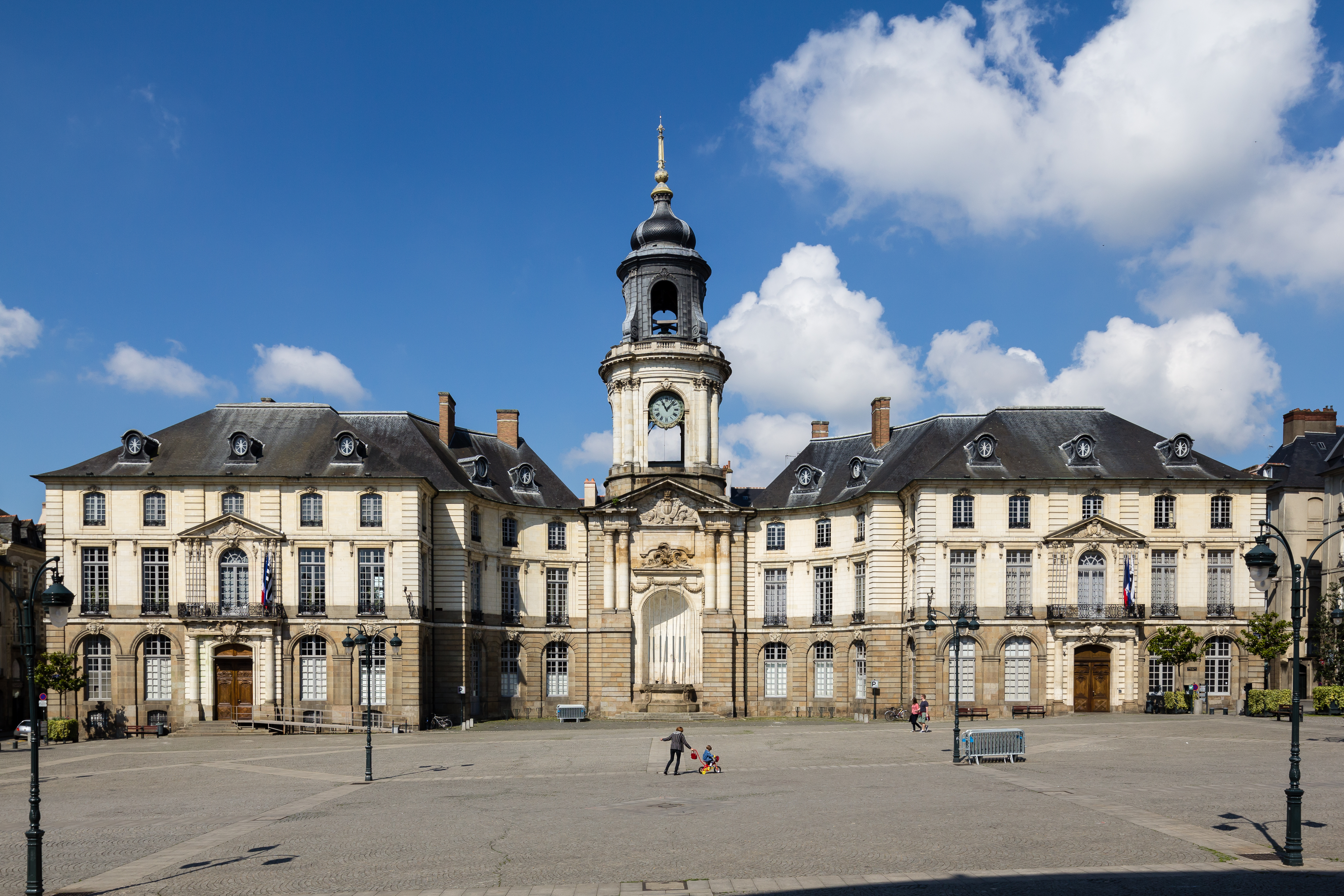
- Main frontage of the Hôtel de Ville in May 2013

General information
- Type: City hall
- Architectural style: Baroque style
- Location: Rennes, France
- Coordinates: 48.1114°N 1.6801°W
- Completed: 1743

Design and construction
- Architect: Jacques Gabriel

Monument historique
- Official name: Hôtel de ville
- Type: Inscrit
- Designated: 1962
- Reference no.: PA00090703

Hôtel de Ville de Rennes (French pronunciation: [otɛl də vil], City Hall) is the seat of the city council in the French city of Rennes. It was designated a monument historique by the French government in 1962.

== History ==
The building was commissioned by the city council, led by Toussaint-François Rallier du Baty, as part of a masterplan, prepared by Isaac Robelin, to rebuild many buildings in Rennes after a fire in 1720. The site they selected was on the west side of a newly created square, the Place de la Mairie. The foundation stone for the new building was laid on 12 April 1734. It was designed by Jacques Gabriel in the baroque style, built in ashlar stone and was completed in 1743.

Gabriel chose to break with the past and create a new building worthy of the Age of Enlightenment. The layout involved two wings, one to the south accommodating the council, and one to the north accommodating a court, with a three-stage bell tower in the centre. The wings were three storeys high and the central bay of each wing featured a doorway flanked by Doric order columns supporting a balcony; there was a French door on the first floor flanked by pilasters supporting a pediment. The first stage of the bell tower contained a statue of Louis XV, which would be destroyed during the French Revolution, flanked by pairs of columns supporting a pediment. The statue of the monarch was created in honour of his support for rebuilding the city. The upper stages formed a belfry and were surmounted by a small dome and finial.

From 1840 to 1855, the Faculty of Sciences at the University of Rennes was based in the north wing, hosting academics such as the chemistry professor Faustino Malaguti. The building was also used for public events: on 31 December 1845, the pianist, Franz Liszt, performed a recital there, at a time when Lisztomania was at its height.

Emmanuel Le Ray refurbished the building in the early 20th century, creating the Panthéon rennais memorial to the victims of the First World War. The names of great French generals are inscribed on the ceiling, although the name of Philippe Pétain – later the head of state of the collaborationist Vichy France – has been removed. The niche where the statue of Louis XV stood was later occupied by a Jean Boucher sculpture of Anne of Brittany, the last sovereign ruler of the duchy, marrying Charles VIII of France. On 7 August 1932, during festivities for the 400th anniversary of the Union of Brittany and France, it was destroyed by a bomb laid by Breton nationalists; nothing has since replaced it on the plinth.

Following the liberation of Rennes on 4 August 1944, the chairman of the Provisional Government, General Charles de Gaulle, made an impassioned speech to 20,000 people from the balcony of the town hall on 21 August 1944.
