= Redones =

Gallic tribe

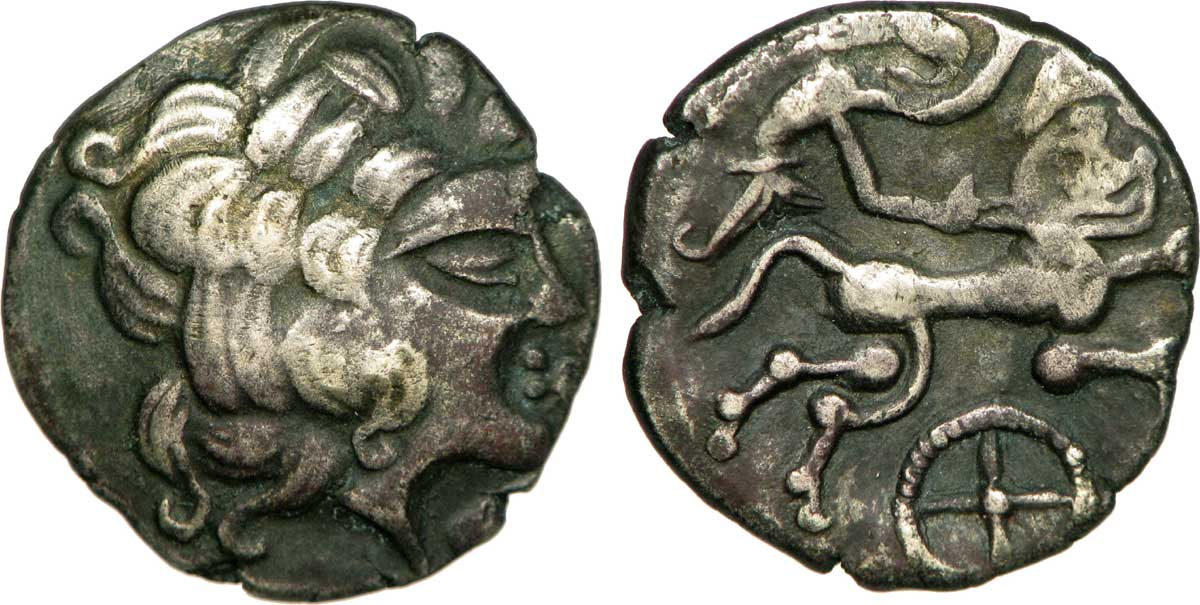
Redonan stater (ca. 80-50 BC).

The Redones or Riedones (Gaulish: Rēdones, later Riedones, 'chariot- or horse-drivers') were a Gallic tribe dwelling in the eastern part of the Brittany peninsula during the Iron Age and subsequent Roman conquest of Gaul. Their capital was at Condate, the site of modern day Rennes.

In 57 BC they were subjugated by the Romans under forces led by Publius Licinius Crassus, the son of the triumvir Marcus Licinius Crassus, but they provided men to the Gallic coalition led by Vercingetorix at the Battle of Alesia in 52.

== Name ==
They are mentioned as R[h]edones by Caesar (mid-1st c. BC), Rhedones (var. r[h]iedones, s[hi]edones) by Pliny (1st c. AD), Rhiḗdones (‛Ριήδονες; var. ‛Ρηήδονες), Rhḗdones (Ῥήδονες) and Rhēḯdones (Ῥηΐδονες) by Ptolemy (2nd c. AD), and as Redonas in the Notitia Dignitatum (5th c. AD). Their chief town is also attested on inscriptions as [civ]itas Ried[onum].

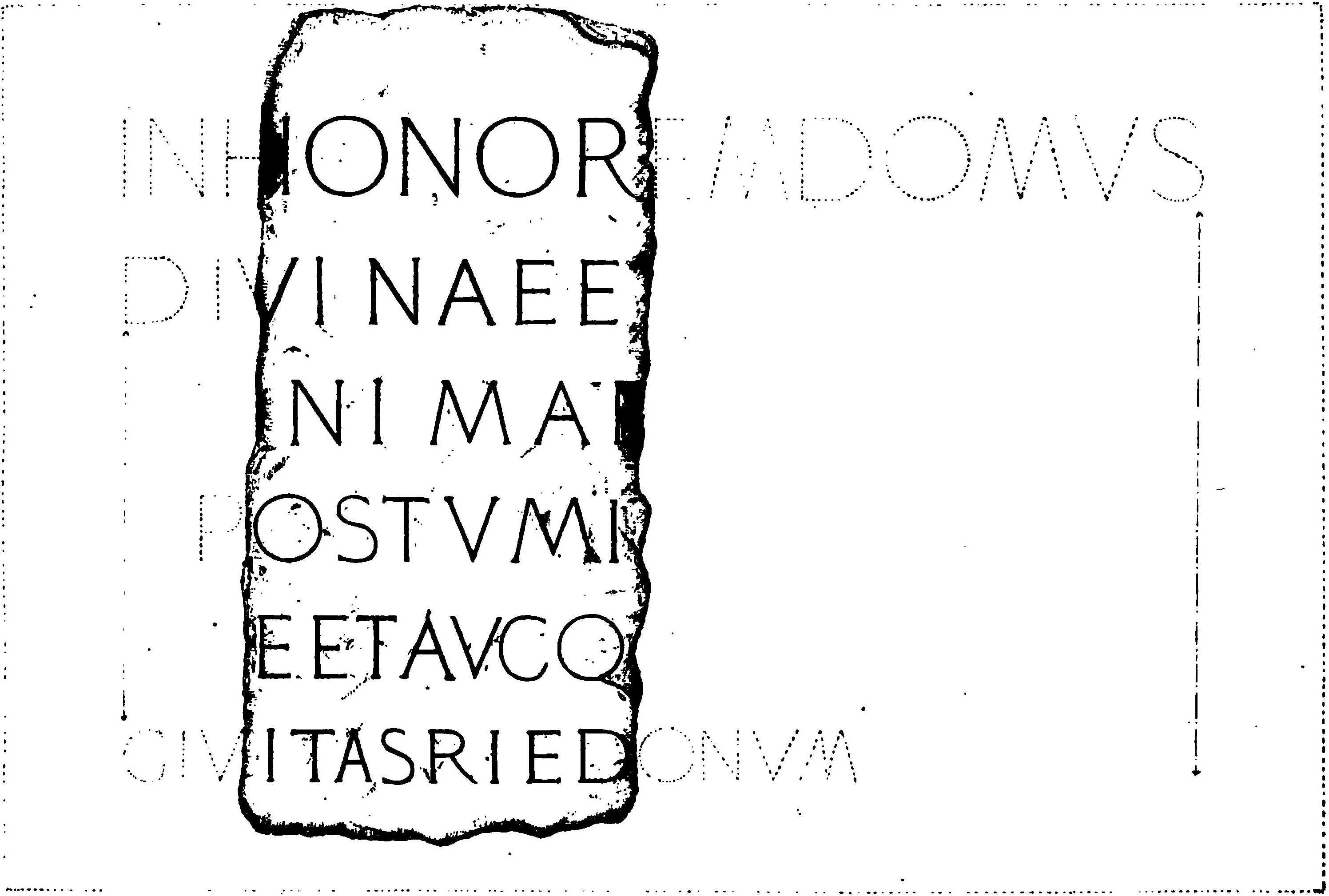
Inscription mentioning Riedonum.

The Gaulish ethnonym Rēdones means 'chariot-drivers' or 'horse-riders'. It stems from the Celtic root *rēd- ('to ride, esp. a horse or horse-led chariot'; cf. Gallo-Latin rēda 'chariot', paraue-redus 'work-horse', ue-rēdus 'post horse') attached to the suffix -ones. (Note: cf. also Old Irish ríad 'riding, driving, journey'; Middle Welsh gorwydd 'horse'.)

The original Rēdones led to a form Riedones after diphthongisation. Following the discovery of inscriptions featuring this variant in the 1960s, some historians, including Anne-Marie Rouanet-Liesenfelt and Louis Pape, have argued that the form Riedones should be preferred over Redones in scholarship, which is not necessary according to linguist Pierre-Yves Lambert.

The city of Rennes, attested ca. 400 AD as civitas Redonum ('civitas of the Redones'; Redonas in 400–441; Rennes in 1294) is named after the Gallic tribe.

== Geography ==
They lived on the peninsula of Brittany in the region which was known at the time as Armorica. Although they controlled a narrow coastline in the southern part of the Mont-Saint-Michel Bay, they did not have a direct opening to maritime trade. Caesar mentions them among the civitates maritimae or Aremoricae. Their territory was located east of the Coriosolites, north of the Namnetes, west of the Aulerci Diablintes, and southwest of the Venelli and Abrincatui.

Their capital was known as Condate Redonum, and was at the site of modern day Rennes.

== History ==
After the bloody fight on the Sambre (57 BC) Julius Caesar sent Publius Licinius Crassus with a single legion into the country of the Veneti, Redones, and other Celtic tribes between the Seine River and the Loire, all of whom submitted. (B. G. ii. 34.) Caesar here enumerates the Redones among the maritime states whose territory extends to the Atlantic Ocean. In 52 BC the Redones with their neighbors sent a contingent to attack Caesar during the siege of Alesia. In this passage also (B. G. vii. 75), the Redones are enumerated among the states bordering on the ocean, which in the Celtic language were called the Armoric States. D'Anville supposes that their territory extended beyond the limits of the diocese of Rennes into the dioceses of St. Malo and Dol-de-Bretagne.
