= Departmental Council of Ille-et-Vilaine =

Departmental legislature in France

Departmental Council of Ille-et-Vilaine Conseil départemental d'Ille-et-Vilaine

Leadership
- President: Jean-Luc Chenut, PS since 2 April 2015

Structure
- Seats: 54
- Political groups: Government (32): PS (12); LÉ (9); DVG (7); PCF (1); PR (1); PRG (1); UDB (1); Opposition (22): DVD (13); LR (3); UDI (2); Agir (1); MoDem (1); RE (1); Ind (1); www.ille-et-vilaine.fr

The Departmental Council of Ille-et-Vilaine (French: Conseil départemental d'Ille-et-Vilaine; Breton: Kuzul-departamant Il-ha-Gwilun) is the deliberative assembly of the Ille-et-Vilaine department in the Brittany region. It consists of 54 members (known as departmental councilors) from 27 cantons.

The President of the Departmental Council is Jean-Luc Chenut of the Socialist Party.

== Vice-Presidents ==
The President of the Departmental Council is assisted by 15 vice-presidents chosen from among the departmental advisers. Each of them has a delegation of authority.

List of vice-presidents of the Ille-et-Vilaine Departmental Council (as of 2021)
| Order | Name | Party | Canton | Delegation |
|---|---|---|---|---|
| 1st | Anne-Françoise Courteille | UG | Montfort-sur-Meu | Child protection |
| 2nd | Nicolas Perrin | PÉ | Rennes-3 | Territorial solidarity and contracts |
| 3rd | Christophe Martins | UG | Montfort-sur-Meu | Finance and management of departmental assets |
| 4th | Armelle Billard | PS | Le Rheu | Elderly and people in disability |
| 5th | Ludovic Coulombel | PS | Melesse | Relations with rural municipalities, housing and digital |
| 6th | Caroline Roger-Moigneu | PÉ | Rennes-5 | Integration and fight against exclusion |
| 7th | Franck Pichot | PS | Redon | Mobility, infrastructure and departmental cycling plan |
| 8th | Emmanuelle Rousset | PS | Rennes-1 | Social and solidarity economy and sustainable development |
| 9th | Stéphane Lenfant | PS | Châteaugiron | Human resources and general means of services |
| 10th | Jeanne Larue | PÉ | Rennes-3 | Education |
| 11th | Yann Soulabaille | PÉ | Rennes-4 | Biodiversity, sensitive natural spaces and water |
| 12th | Gaëlle Mestries | PS | Melesse | Youth |
| 13th | Denez Marchand | UGE | Rennes-2 | Culture and languages of Brittany |
| 14th | Cécile Bouton | DVG | Bruz | Citizenship and participatory democracy |
| 15th | Roger Morazin | PS | Guichen | Sport |

== See also ==
- Ille-et-Vilaine
- General councils of France
