= Cantons of the Ille-et-Vilaine department =

The following is a list of the 27 cantons of the Ille-et-Vilaine department, in France, following the French canton reorganisation which came into effect in March 2015:

- Bain-de-Bretagne
- Betton
- Bruz
- Châteaugiron
- Combourg
- Dol-de-Bretagne
- Fougères-1
- Fougères-2
- La Guerche-de-Bretagne
- Guichen
- Janzé
- Liffré
- Melesse
- Montauban-de-Bretagne
- Montfort-sur-Meu
- Redon
- Rennes-1
- Rennes-2
- Rennes-3
- Rennes-4
- Rennes-5
- Rennes-6
- Le Rheu
- Saint-Malo-1
- Saint-Malo-2
- Val-Couesnon
- Vitré
