= Ille-et-Vilaine's 1st constituency =

Constituency of the National Assembly of France

1st constituency of Ille-et-Vilaine
- inline Constituency of the National Assembly of France

- Constituency in department

- Ille-et-Vilaine in France
- Deputy: Marie Mesmeur; LFI
- Department: Ille-et-Vilaine
- Cantons: (pre-2015) Bruz, Rennes-3, Rennes-4, Rennes-5,
- Registered voters: 89,688

The 1st constituency of Ille-et-Vilaine is a French legislative constituency in the Ille-et-Vilaine département. Like the other 576 French constituencies, it elects one MP using the two-round system, with a run-off if no candidate receives over 50% of the vote in the first round.

== Deputies ==
Election	Member	Party
1958	Henri Fréville	MRP
1962	Henri Fréville	MRP
1967	Henri Fréville	MRP
1968	Jacques Cressard	UDR
1973	Jacques Cressard	UDR
1978	Jacques Cressard	RPR
1981	Edmond Hervé	PS
1986	Proportional representation - no election by constituency	
1988	Jean-Michel Boucheron	PS
1993	Jean-Michel Boucheron	PS
1997	Jean-Michel Boucheron	PS
2002	Jean-Michel Boucheron	PS
2007	Jean-Michel Boucheron	PS
2012	Marie-Anne Chapdelaine	PS
2017	Mostapha Laabid	LREM
2022	Frédéric Mathieu	LFI
2024	Marie Mesmeur	LFI

== Election results ==
=== 2024 ===
Candidate	Party	Alliance	First round			Second round		
Candidate	Party	Alliance	Votes	%	+/–	Votes	%	+/–
Marie Mesmeur	LFI	NFP	28,467	42.31	+3.04	30,190	45.66	
Nicolas Boucher	REN	Ensemble	21,453	31.88	-0.79	24,181	36.57	
Jeanne Rey du Boissieu	RN		11,878	17.65	+8.09	11,754	17.78	
Joëlle Le Gall	LR	UDC	3,372	5.01	new			
Sébastien Girard	REG		887	1.32	+0.76			
Valérie Hamon	LO		875	1.30	+0.28			
Rosa Vasquez	DVG		347	0.52	new			
Frédéric Mathieu	LFI	diss.	8	0.01	new			
Votes			67,287	100.00			100.00	
Valid votes			67,287	97.75	-0.06	66,125	97.57	
Blank votes			1,089	1.58	+0.04	1,216	1.79	
Null votes			458	0.67	+0.03	431	0.64	
Turnout			6,883	72.97	+19.44	67,772	71.82	
Abstentions			25,504	27.03	-19.44	26,594	28.18	
Registered voters			94,338			94,366		
Result			LFI HOLD					

Frédéric Mathieu stood for election as a dissident member of LFI, without the endorsement of NFP.

=== 2022 ===
Legislative Election 2022: Ille-et-Vilaine's 1st constituency
Party	Candidate	Votes	%	±%
LFI (NUPÉS)	Frédéric Mathieu	19,220	39.27	+4.57
LREM (Ensemble)	Hind Saoud	15,992	32.67	-2.03
RN	Nadine Desprez	4,679	9.56	+3.51
DVE	Yannick Le Moing	2,470	5.05	N/A
UDI (UDC)	Jean-Bruno Barguil	1,902	3.89	−11.79
REC	Laurent Siegward	1,184	2.42	N/A
UDB	Jean-François Monnier	1,032	2.11	N/A
Others	N/A	2,469	5.04	
Turnout		48,948	53.53	−0.67
2nd round result
LFI (NUPÉS)	Frédéric Mathieu	25,205	52.62	N/A
LREM (Ensemble)	Hind Saoud	22,691	47.38	−11.49
Turnout		47,896	54.20	+11.80
LFI gain from LREM				

=== 2017 ===
Candidate	Label	First round		Second round	
Candidate	Label	Votes	%	Votes	%
Mostapha Laabid	REM	16,583	34.70	19,346	58.87
Grégoire Le Blond	UDI	7,494	15.68	13,519	41.13
Marie-Anne Chapdelaine	PS	6,854	14.34		
Patrick Bergogné	FI	6,207	12.99		
Émeric Salmon	FN	2,892	6.05		
Didier Chapellon	ECO	2,752	5.76		
Charlotte Marchandise	DIV	1,059	2.22		
Michel Demolder	PCF	771	1.61		
Denis Vernier	DVD	616	1.29		
Luc Melot	ECO	550	1.15		
Philippe Salmon	DVG	435	0.91		
Adeline Chantoiseau	DIV	393	0.82		
Delphine Ruaux	REG	352	0.74		
Valérie Hamon	EXG	312	0.65		
Sébastien Girard	ECO	241	0.50		
Pierre-François Bazin	ECO	225	0.47		
Erdogan Aktas	DIV	55	0.12		
Votes		47,791	100.00	32,865	100.00
Valid votes		47,791	98.32	32,865	86.43
Blank votes		573	1.18	4,085	10.74
Null votes		245	0.50	1,074	2.82
Turnout		48,609	54.20	38,024	42.40
Abstentions		41,080	45.80	51,664	57.60
Registered voters		89,689		89,688	
Source: Ministry of the Interior

=== 2012 ===
2012 legislative election in Ille-Et-Vilaine's 1st constituency
Candidate	Party	First round		Second round	
Candidate	Party	Votes	%	Votes	%
Marie-Anne Chapdelaine	PS	17,168	35.13%	30,565	66.63%
Grégoire Le Blond	AC	10,126	20.72%	15,307	33.37%
Jean-Michel Boucheron	PS dissident	8,670	17.74%		
Geneviève Quillet	FN	3,711	7.59%		
Solène Raude	EELV	3,515	7.19%		
Eric Berroche	FG	1,951	3.99%		
Karin Leroux	NC	1,103	2.26%		
Etch Kalala		638	1.31%		
Sigrid Belin	??	465	0.95%		
Laurence Dubois	PR	417	0.85%		
Léa Soulard	NPA	416	0.85%		
Christophe Daniou	JB (BNAFET)	294	0.60%		
Valérie Hamon	LO	256	0.52%		
Alexandre Noury	SP	133	0.27%		
Valid votes		48,863	98.47%	45,872	97.25%
Spoilt and null votes		757	1.53%	1,295	2.75%
Votes cast / turnout		49,620	56.96%	47,167	54.15%
Abstentions		37,490	43.04%	39,943	45.85%
Registered voters		87,110	100.00%	87,110	100.00%

=== 2007 ===
Legislative Election 2007: Ille-et-Vilaine's 1st constituency
Party	Candidate	Votes	%	±%
PS	Jean-Michel Boucheron	18,668	42.88	−0.49
UMP	Marie Louis	9,359	21.50	+3.68
MoDem	Gregoire Le Blond	4,979	11.44	N/A
DVD	Tannick Le Moing	3,250	7.47	N/A
LV	Mélanie Le Verger	2,259	5.19	−0.54
PCF	Eric Berroche	1,460	3.35	+0.34
FN	Joelle Le Guillou	887	2.04	−2.51
Others	N/A	2,672	-	−
Turnout		44,089	59.27	−2.34
2nd round result
PS	Jean-Michel Boucheron	26,541	65.49	+3.34
UMP	Marie Louis	13,988	34.51	−3.34
Turnout		41,693	55.97	−1.25
PS hold				

=== 2002 ===
Legislative Election 2002: Ille-et-Vilaine's 1st constituency
Party	Candidate	Votes	%	±%
PS	Jean-Michel Boucheron	18,935	43.37	+4.52
UMP	Sophie Simon	7,779	17.82	N/A
UDF	Grégoire Le Blond	3,704	8.48	−16.86
MPF	Patrick Le Moing	3,318	7.60	N/A
LV	Daniel Salmon	2,501	5.73	+1.02
FN	Brigitte Neveux	1,985	4.55	−2.64
PCF	Christian Benoist	1,313	3.01	−4.73
DVG	Patrick Mainguené	1,112	2.55	N/A
Others	N/A	3,011	-	−
Turnout		44,299	61.61	−0.90
2nd round result
PS	Jean-Michel Boucheron	24,863	62.15	−1.23
UMP	Sophie Simon	15,139	37.85	N/A
Turnout		41,140	57.22	−8.87
PS hold				

=== 1997 ===
Legislative Election 1997: Ille-et-Vilaine's 1st constituency
Party	Candidate	Votes	%	±%
PS	Jean-Michel Boucheron	16,041	38.85	
PPDF (UDF)	Jean-Pierre Dragorn	10,462	25.34	
PCF	Christian Benoist	3,196	7.74	
FN	Pierre Maugendre	2,969	7.19	
LV	Jean-Louis Merrien	1,946	4.71	
LO	Josette Grimaud	1,728	4.18	
DVE	Pascale Loget	1,346	3.26	
Others	N/A	3,606	-	
Turnout		43,004	62.51	
2nd round result
PS	Jean-Michel Boucheron	27,473	63.38	
PPDF (UDF)	Jean-Pierre Dragorn	15,874	36.62	
Turnout		45,459	66.09	
PS hold				

=== 1993 ===
Legislative Election 1993: Ille-et-Vilaine 1st - 2nd round
Party	Candidate	Votes	%	±%
PS	Jean-Michel Boucheron	22,131	52.91	
UDF	Jean-Pierre Dagorn	19,696	47.09	
Turnout		44,389	67.87	
PS hold		Swing		

=== 1988 ===
Legislative Election 1988: Ille-et-Vilaine 1st
Party	Candidate	Votes	%	±%
PS	Jean-Michel Boucheron	18,974	50.70	
UDF	Jean-Pierre Dagorn	11,853	31.67	
PCF	Christian Benoist	2,803	7.49	
FN	H. Sachot	2,071	1.66	
DVG	Anne-Marie Daniel	1,234	3.30	
DVG	H. Fournier	2,071	5.53	
Turnout		98,457	73.75	
PS hold		Swing		

== Sources ==
- INSEE's slip of this constituency: "Tableaux et Analyses de la première circonscription d'Ille-et-Vilaine" (PDF) (in French).
- List of Ille-et-Vilaine's deputies from 1789: "Tous les députés du département d'Ille-et-Vilaine depuis 1789" (in French). Archived from the original on 30 September 2007.
- Official results of French elections from 1998: "Résultats électoraux officiels en France" (in French). Archived from the original on 20 December 2011.
