= Chantepie =

Chantepie Chauntepiy (Gallo) Kantpig (Breton)
- Commune
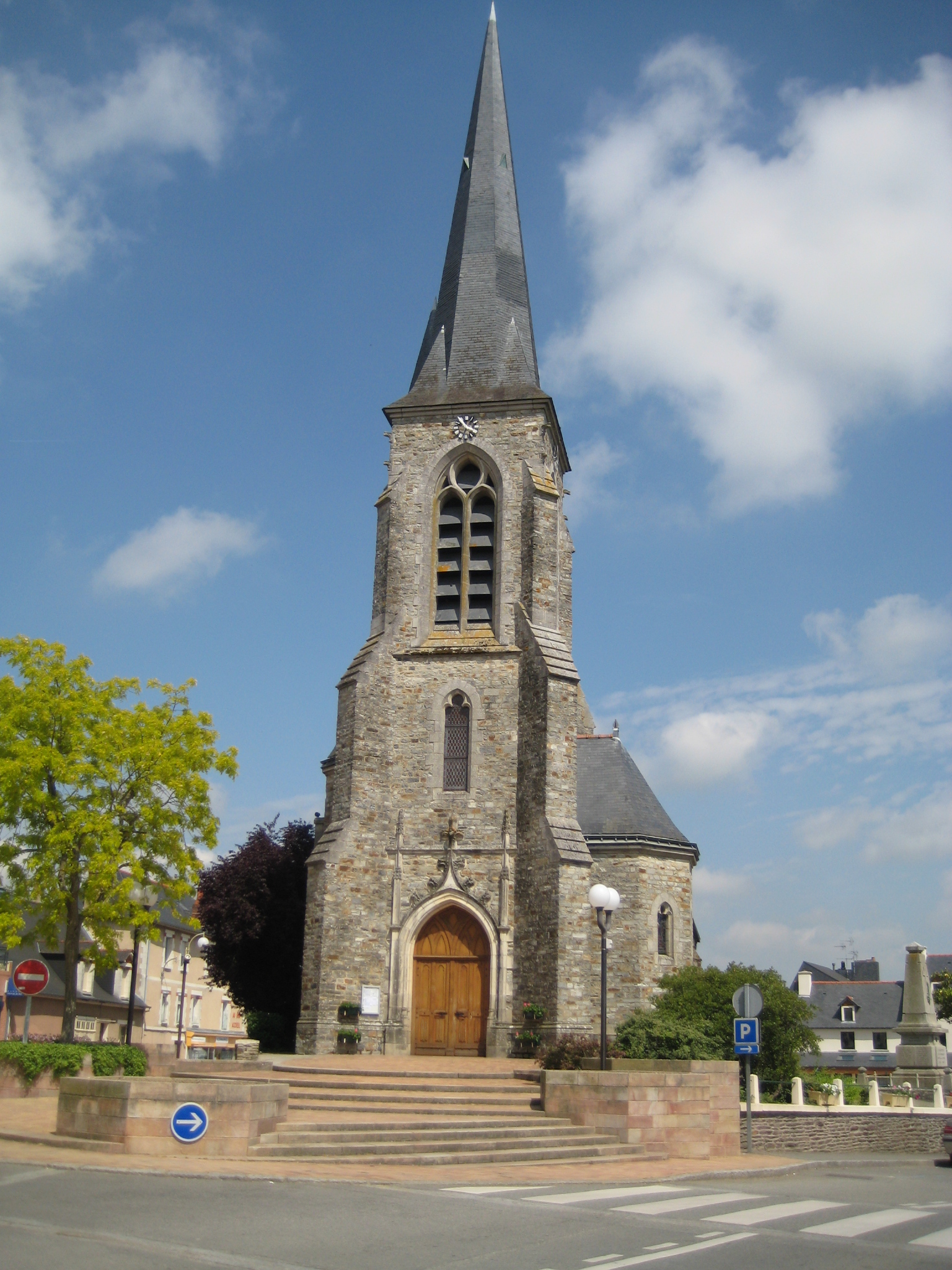
- Saint Martin church
- Location of Chantepie
- Location within France Location within Brittany
- Coordinates: 48°05′21″N 1°36′55″W
- Country: France
- Region: Brittany
- Department: Ille-et-Vilaine
- Arrondissement: Rennes
- Canton: Rennes-3
- Intercommunality: Rennes Métropole

Government
  - Mayor (2020–2026): Gilles Dreuslin (PS)
- Area^{1}: 11.98 km^{2} (4.63 sq mi)
- Highest elevation: 77 m (253 ft)
- Lowest elevation: 32 m (105 ft)
- Population (2023): 10,670
  - Density: 890.7/km^{2} (2,307/sq mi)
- Time zone: UTC+01:00 (CET)
  - Summer (DST): UTC+02:00 (CEST)
- INSEE/Postal code: 35055 /35135
- ^{1} French Land Register data, which excludes lakes, ponds, glaciers > 1 km^{2} (0.386 sq mi or 247 acres) and river estuaries.

Chantepie (French pronunciation: [ʃɑ̃tpi]; Breton: Kantpig; Gallo: Chauntepiy) is a commune of Rennes Métropole located in the Ille-et-Vilaine department in Brittany in northwestern France.

== Population ==
Inhabitants of Chantepie are called Cantepiens in French.

Historical population
Year	Pop.	±% p.a.
1968	1,594	—
1975	2,651	+7.54%
1982	3,677	+4.78%
1990	5,898	+6.08%
1999	6,793	+1.58%
2007	8,003	+2.07%
2012	10,222	+5.02%
2017	10,435	+0.41%
2023	10,670	+0.37%
Source: INSEE

== See also ==
- Communes of the Ille-et-Vilaine department
