= Arrondissements of the Ille-et-Vilaine department =

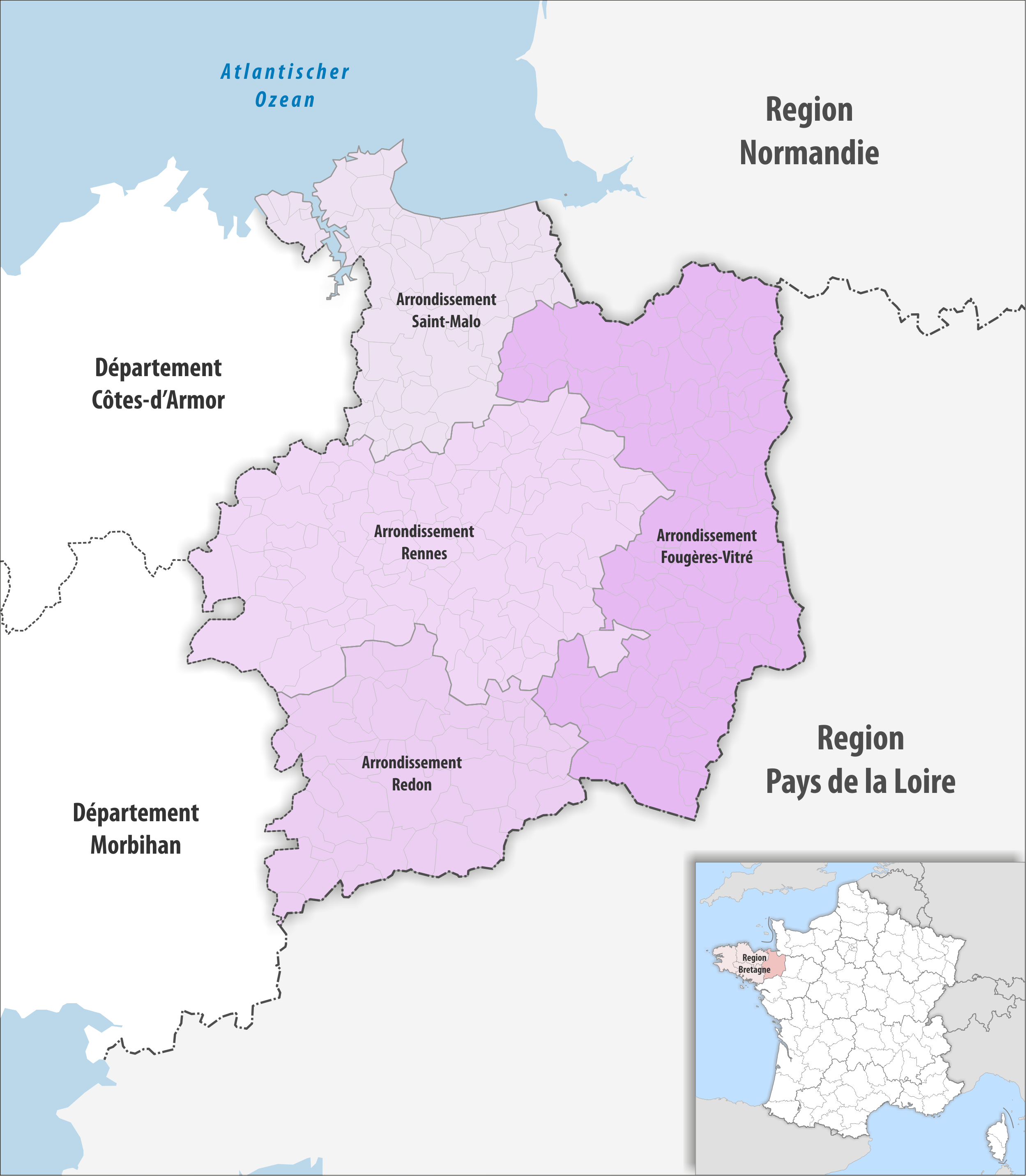
Map of arrondissements of the Ille-et-Vilaine department.

The 4 arrondissements of the Ille-et-Vilaine department are:

1. Arrondissement of Fougères-Vitré, (subprefecture: Fougères) with 106 communes. The population of the arrondissement was 187,711 in 2021.
2. Arrondissement of Redon, (subprefecture: Redon) with 50 communes. The population of the arrondissement was 104,882 in 2021.
3. Arrondissement of Rennes, (prefecture of the Ille-et-Vilaine department: Rennes) with 109 communes. The population of the arrondissement was 633,702 in 2021.
4. Arrondissement of Saint-Malo, (subprefecture: Saint-Malo) with 68 communes. The population of the arrondissement was 172,030 in 2021.

== History ==
In 1800, the arrondissements of Rennes, Fougères, Montfort, Redon, Saint-Malo and Vitré were established. The arrondissements of Montfort and Vitré were disbanded in 1926. In 2010, the arrondissement of Fougères was renamed Fougères-Vitré, and it absorbed the six cantons of Argentré-du-Plessis, Châteaubourg, La Guerche-de-Bretagne, Retiers, Vitré-Est and Vitré-Ouest from the arrondissement of Rennes.

The borders of the arrondissements of Ille-et-Vilaine were modified in January 2017:

- four communes from the arrondissement of Fougères-Vitré to the arrondissement of Rennes
- one commune from the arrondissement of Redon to the arrondissement of Rennes
- five communes from the arrondissement of Rennes to the arrondissement of Fougères-Vitré
- seven communes from the arrondissement of Rennes to the arrondissement of Saint-Malo
