= Frédéric Mathieu =

French politician (born 1977)

Member of the National Assembly for Ille-et-Vilaine's 1st constituency
- In office 22 June 2022 – 9 June 2024
- Preceded by: Mostapha Laabid
- Succeeded by: Marie Mesmeur

Personal details
- Born: 6 November 1977 (age 48) Melun, France
- Party: La France Insoumise (since 2016)
- Other political affiliations: Left Party (since 2008); Socialist Party (2000-2007)
- Education: University of Rennes 1

Frédéric Mathieu (French pronunciation: [fʁedeʁik matjø]; born 6 November 1977) is a French politician. A member of La France insoumise, he was elected Member of Parliament for Ille-et-Vilaine's 1st constituency in the 2022 French legislative election supported by NUPES. Mathieu intended to stand again in the 2024 French legislative election. With the founding of the New Popular Front, he was not re-nominated.

== Biography ==
=== Early life ===
Frédéric Mathieu is the son of a police officer father and a nurse mother from the Paris region. Born in Melun, in Seine-et-Marne. He moved to Rennes at the age of 12 with his family. He studied economics at University of Rennes 1.

His activist activity began in the 2000s within the Socialist Party. However, he left after the party leaders voted in favour of the Lisbon Treaty to join the Left Party co-founded by Jean-Luc Mélenchon, then joined La France insoumise.

A civil service executive at the Ministry of the Armed Forces, specializing in the control of public arms markets. He was also a trade unionist and a member of the CGT.

=== Member of Parliament ===
In the 2022 French legislative election, he was a candidate in Ille-et-Vilaine's 1st constituency, under the colours of NUPES. He came first in the first round with 39.27% of the votes ahead of Hind Saoud of the Presidential majority (LREM - ENS), whom he beat in the second round with 52.62% of the votes. As an MP, he sits on the National Defence and Armed Forces Committee.

In addition to defending the common program of the NUPES, he cites two subjects on which he wishes to invest in particular within the LFI group: “the first is the trade in arms which are today treated as a commodity like the others which is an aberration in terms of geopolitical stability in the world. The second subject is gender equality in the world of work where women are treated as underworkers”. He fired his Bérénice Alaterre following, according to him, testimonies from his colleagues who accused Bérénice Alaterre of degrading and sexualizing comments, the latter then filed a complaint against him for moral harassment.

During the 2024 legislative elections, La France insoumise refused the nomination to five “rebels”: Danielle Simonnet, Raquel Garrido, Alexis Corbière and Hendrik Davi. Comedian Guillaume Meurice, recently fired from France Inter, was approached by LFI to replace him, but faced with his refusal, it was ultimately Marie Mesmeur, companion of MP Louis Boyard, who was chosen. Marie Mesmeur, who was a candidate in the 2024 European Parliament election in France, received the LFI nomination in Ille-et-Vilaine's 1st constituency but Mathieu initially decided to maintain his candidacy. He finally withdrew “for lack of a substitute”.

== Mandates ==
- Deputy for Ille-et-Vilaine's 1st constituency (2022-2024)
