= Marie Mesmeur =

French politician

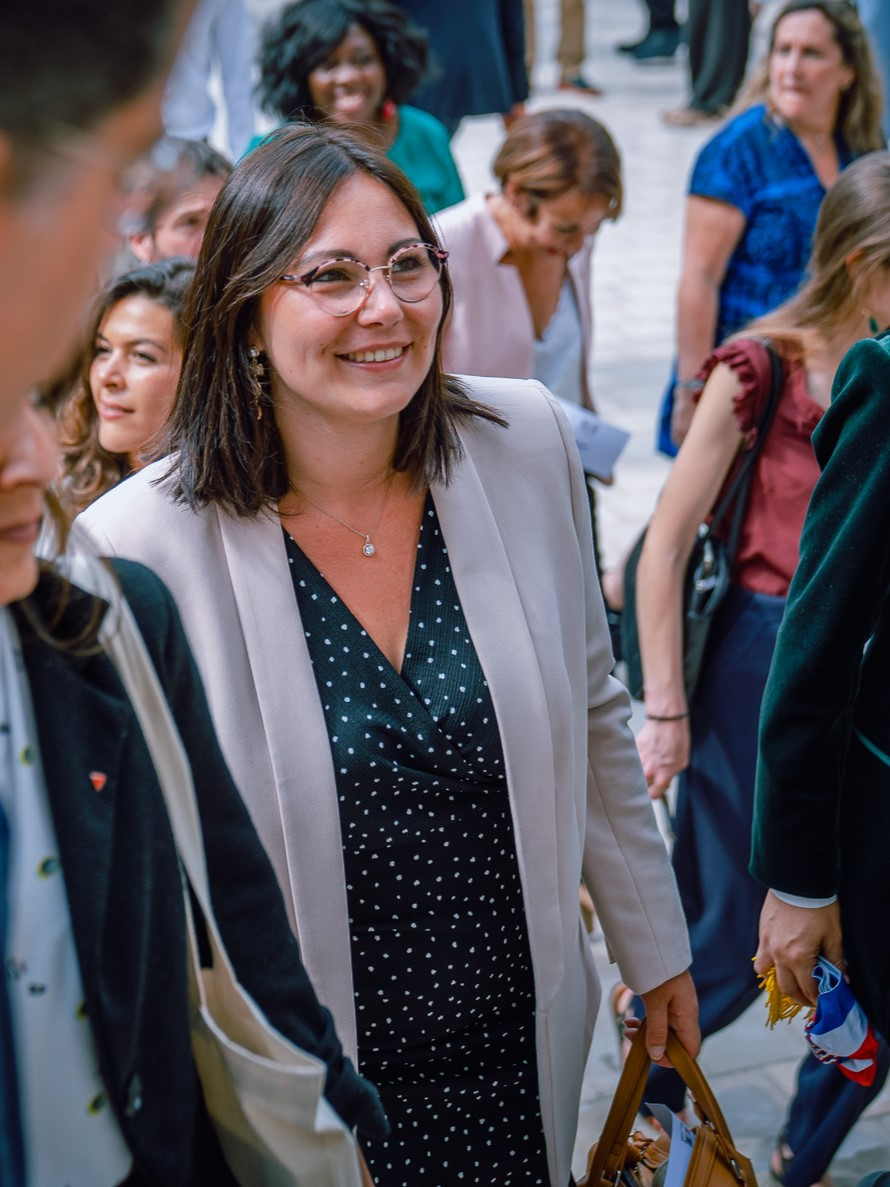
- Marie Mesmeur in the National Assembly on 9 July 2024

Member of the French National Assembly for Ille-et-Vilaine's 1st constituency
- Incumbent
- Assumed office 18 July 2024
- Preceded by: Frédéric Mathieu

Personal details
- Born: 12 August 1994 (age 31) Landerneau, France
- Party: La France Insoumise
- Domestic partner: Louis Boyard

Marie Mesmeur (born 12 August 1994 in Landerneau, Finistère) is a French politician, sociologist, and activist. A member of La France insoumise (LFI), she has served as deputy for Ille-et-Vilaine's 1st constituency since 2024. She is known for her involvement in student organizing, social justice campaigns, and international solidarity initiatives.

== Early life and education ==
Mesmeur grew up in Saint-Divy, Finistère. She earned a diploma as an éducatrice spécialisée (specialized educator) in 2017 from the University of Western Brittany in Brest, followed by a master's degree in sociology. She later began doctoral research on child protection policies within the Finistère Departmental Council.

== Activism ==
While a student, Mesmeur co-founded the organization Une Alternative, which later became L’Alternative and evolved into the Union étudiante. She served as the organization’s national secretary from 2019 to 2022, focusing on student precarity, social rights, and higher-education access.

== Political career ==
In the 2022 legislative elections, Mesmeur was the substitute candidate for Pierre-Yves Cadalen in Finistère’s 2nd constituency. She later appeared on the La France insoumise list for the 2024 European Parliament elections, placed 17th.

In 2024, she was nominated by the Nouveau Front populaire to represent the left in Ille-et-Vilaine's 1st constituency and was elected to the National Assembly in July 2024.

In parliament, she sits with the La France insoumise – Nouveau Front populaire group and is a member of the Commission for Cultural and Educational Affairs. Her legislative work centers on youth, social services, and education. She has also engaged internationally on issues of humanitarian law and Palestinian rights.

=== Global Sumud Flotilla ===
In 2025, Mesmeur joined the Global Sumud Flotilla, a humanitarian initiative aiming to deliver aid to the Gaza Strip and denounce the blockade. Before departure, she declared the mission “strictly peaceful and humanitarian.”

Following Israeli drone strikes and the interception of the flotilla, she accused Israel of violating international law and described the attacks as “war crimes.”

Mesmeur was reportedly detained by Israeli forces and, along with other French and Belgian participants, began a hunger strike to protest her detention.

French media later reported she was transferred to the Negev prison in Israel pending diplomatic contact.

=== Amsterdam incident ===
In November 2024, disturbances broke out in Amsterdam around a football match between Ajax Amsterdam and Maccabi Tel Aviv. The event, which attracted heightened security due to political and regional tensions, saw confrontations between groups of supporters before and after the game. Several people were injured, and police made multiple arrests. Media outlets offered differing accounts of the causes, with some attributing the violence to nationalist or football-related hostility rather than to religious motives.

Following these events, Mesmeur published a message on X (formerly Twitter) stating that “the people involved were not attacked because they were Jewish, but because they were racist and supported a genocide.”

Her post prompted a wide range of political reactions in France. Bruno Retailleau (Les Républicains), then Minister of the Interior, referred the tweet to prosecutors under Article 40 of the French Code of Criminal Procedure for possible “apology of crime.” Members of the Socialist Party (PS) and Renaissance party criticized her remarks as inappropriate in tone, while figures from La France insoumise and the Nouveau Front populaire described the backlash as disproportionate and emphasized that her message was meant as political commentary rather than justification of violence.

As of October 2025, the judicial referral remains under review, and no ruling has been issued. Observers and commentators continue to debate both the meaning of Mesmeur’s statement and the broader context of public discourse surrounding the Amsterdam incident.
