= Marie-Anne Chapdelaine =

French politician

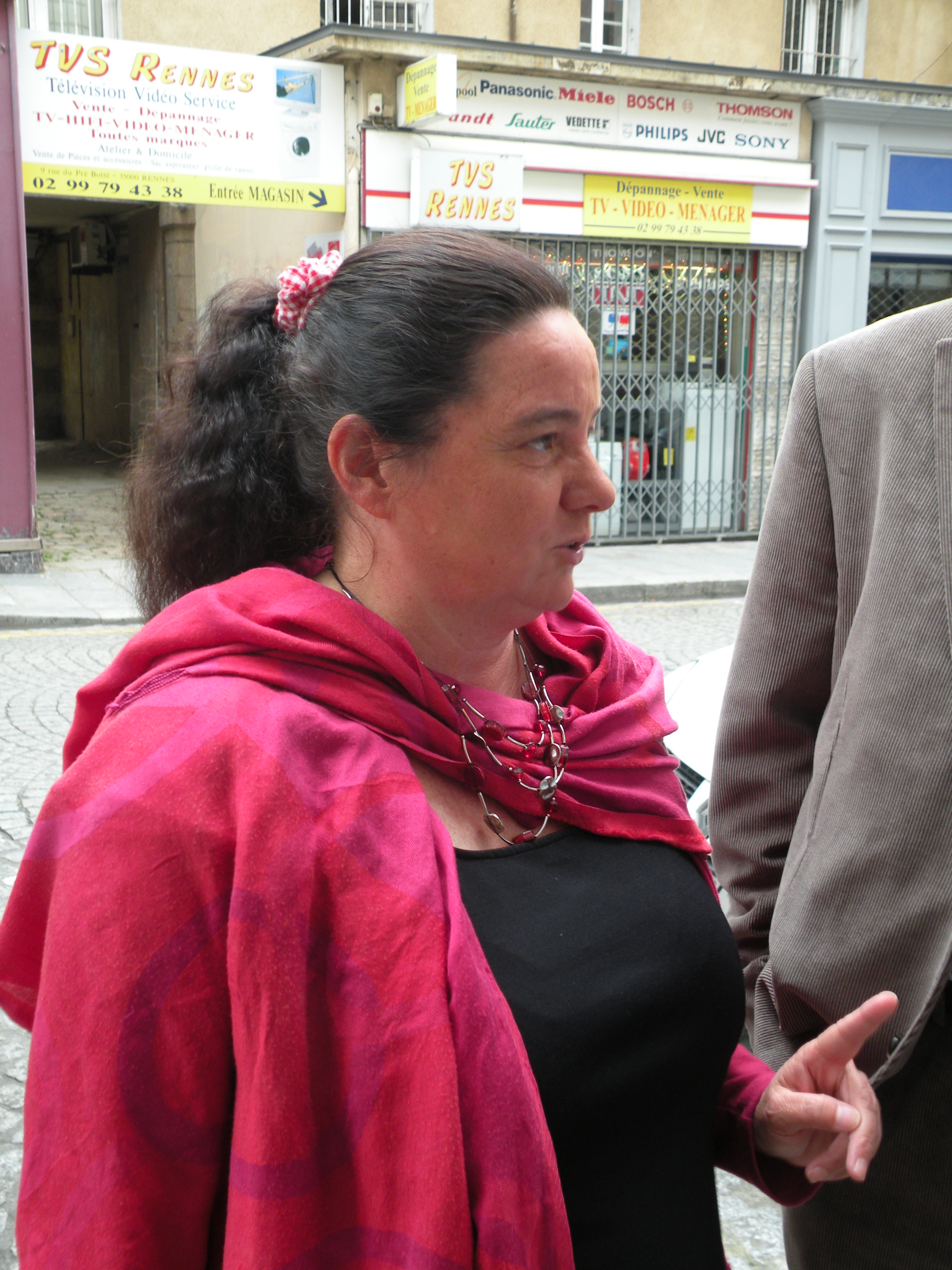
- Marie-Anne Chapdelaine in Rennes in June 2012
- Parliamentary group: Socialist

Deputy for Ille-et-Vilaine's 1st constituency in the National Assembly of France
- In office 2012–2017
- Preceded by: Jean-Michel Boucheron
- Succeeded by: Mostapha Laabid

Personal details
- Born: March 20, 1962 (age 64) Revin

Marie-Anne Chapdelaine (born 20 March 1962 in Revin) is a French politician, member of the Socialist Party. She was the deputy for Ille-et-Vilaine's 1st constituency in the National Assembly of France from 2012 to 2017, succeeding Jean-Michel Boucheron.
