= Jean-Michel Boucheron (Ille-et-Vilaine politician) =

French politician

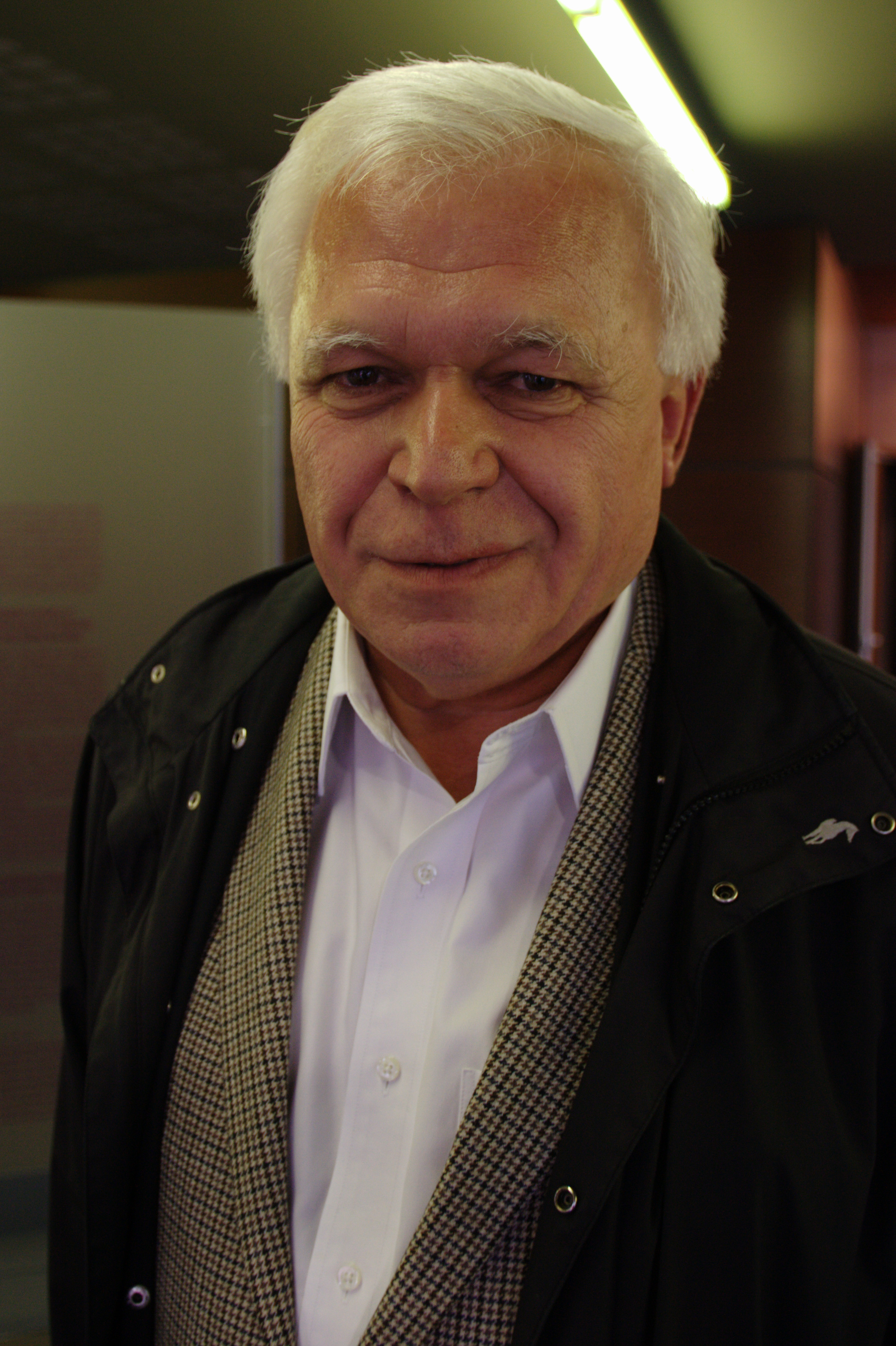
Jean-Michel Boucheron, on 6 October 2012 in Rennes.

Jean-Michel Boucheron (born 6 March 1948) was a member of the National Assembly of France from 1981 to 2012. He represented the 1st constituency of Ille-et-Vilaine in seven consecutive assemblies. He is a member of the Socialiste, radical, citoyen et divers gauche.

He was defeated at the first round of the Legislative Election in 2012 after losing the support of the Socialist Party. The official socialist candidate, Marie-Anne Chapdelaine, was elected.
