= Mostapha Laabid =

French politician

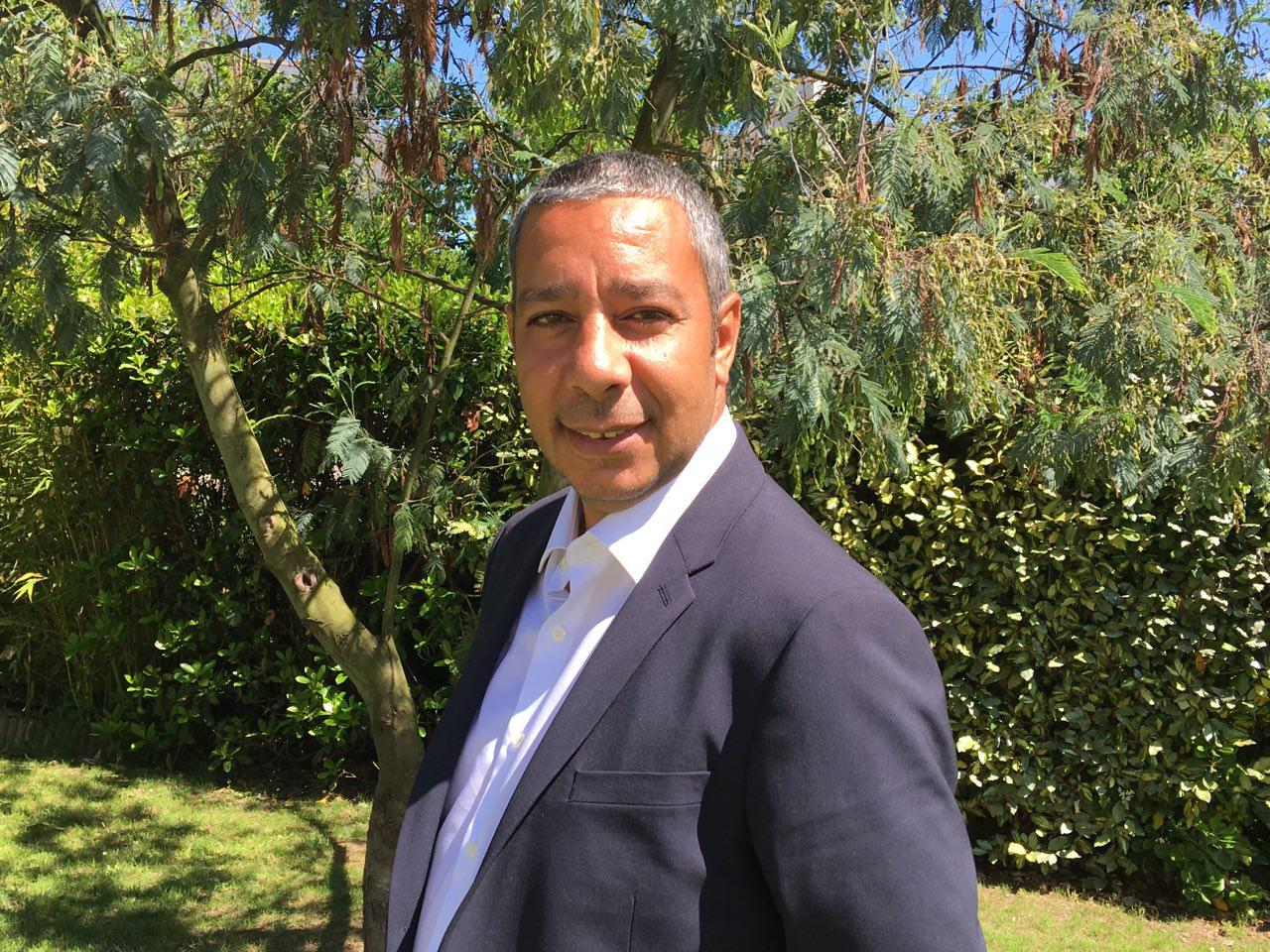

Member of the National Assembly for Ille-et-Vilaine's 1st constituency
- In office 21 June 2017 – 7 September 2021
- Preceded by: Marie-Anne Chapdelaine
- Succeeded by: Frédéric Mathieu

Personal details
- Born: 29 March 1969 (age 57) Rennes, France
- Party: La République En Marche!
- Education: University of Rennes 1

Mostapha Laabid (born 29 March 1969) is a French politician, formerly of La République En Marche!. He was the French National Assembly deputy for Ille-et-Vilaine's 1st constituency from 21 June 2017 to 7 September 2021.

Laabid currently runs the Rennes chapter of Fondation Agir Contre l'Exclusion (Action Against Exclusion Foundation, or FACE), a private foundation which aims to combat employment discrimination.

In 2020 he was convicted of embezzlement.
