= Canton of Rennes-2 =

Coordinates: 48.11°N 1.66°W

- Canton
- Country: France
- Region: Brittany
- Department: Ille-et-Vilaine
- No. of communes: {{{nbcomm}}}

Government
  - Representatives (2021–2028): Marion Le Frène (EELV); Denez Marchand (UDB)
- Population (2023): 44,766
- INSEE code: 35 19

The canton of Rennes-2 is an administrative division of the Ille-et-Vilaine department, in northwestern France. It was created at the French canton reorganisation which came into effect in March 2015. Its seat is in Rennes.

The canton is entirely included in the commune of Rennes.

== Councillors ==
Election	Councillor	Party
2015	Damien Bongart*	G·s
2015	Catherine Debroise	PS
2021	Marion Le Frène	EELV
2021	Denez Marchand	UDB
* Resigned in 2020, replaced by Daniel Heurtault (PS)

== Detailed election results ==
=== 2015 ===
The departmental elections of 2015 was held on 22 (first round) and 29 (second round) March 2019.

Candidates		Parties	First round		Second round	
Candidates		Parties	Votes	%	Votes	%
1	Damien Bongart	PS	3,321	37.57	4,847	58.77
1	Catherine Debroise	PS	3,321	37.57	4,847	58.77
2	Antoine Cressard	UMP	2,614	29.57	3,400	41.23
2	Laurence Taillandier	DVD	2,614	29.57	3,400	41.23
3	Anne Caillet	EÉLV	1,260	14.26		
3	Michel Chauvière	EÉLV	1,260	14.26		
4	Régis Barbié	FN	967	10.94		
4	Natacha Fabre	FN	967	10.94		
5	Jeannie Barbier	PCF	677	7.66		
5	Germain Doucet	E!	677	7.66		
Registered voters			19,006	100.00	19,005	100.00
Not voted			9,876	51.96	10,196	53.65
Turnout			9,130	48.04	8,809	46.35
Blank ballots			217	1.14	395	2.08
Invalid ballots			74	0.39	167	0.88
Valid votes			8,839	46.51	8,247	43.39

=== 2021 ===
The departmental election of 2021 was held on 20 (first round) and 27 (second round) June 2021.

Candidates		Parties	First round		Second round	
Candidates		Parties	Votes	%	Votes	%
1	Marion Le Frêne	EELV	2,484	33.27	3,432	53.78
1	Denez Marchand	UDB	2,484	33.27	3,432	53.78
2	Catherine Debroisea	PS	2,235	29.93	2,949	46.22
2	Vincent Haloua	PCF	2,235	29.93	2,949	46.22
3	Sandrine Caroff-Urfer	LREM	1,201	16.08		
3	Henri-Noël Ruiz	LREM	1,201	16.08		
4	Pierre Abegg	LR	1,003	13.43		
4	Anaïs Jéhanno	LR	1,003	13.43		
5	Marie de Lespinay	RN	544	7.29		
5	Denis Duvernoy	RN	544	7.29		
Registered voters			20,211	100.00	20,210	100.00
Not voted			12,553	62.11	12,621	62.45
Turnout			7,658	37.89	7,589	37.55
Blank ballots			136	0.67	899	4.45
Invalid ballots			55	0.27	309	1.53
Valid votes			7,467	36.95	6,381	31.57
