= Canton of Rennes-1 =

Coordinates: 48.12°N 1.68°W

- Canton
- Country: France
- Region: Brittany
- Department: Ille-et-Vilaine
- No. of communes: {{{nbcomm}}}

Government
  - Representatives (2021–2028): Marc Hervé (PS); Emmanuelle Rousset (PS)
- Population (2023): 42,097
- INSEE code: 35 18

The canton of Rennes-1 is an administrative division of the Ille-et-Vilaine department, in northwestern France. It was created at the French canton reorganisation which came into effect in March 2015. Its seat is in Rennes.

The canton is entirely included in the commune of Rennes.

== Councillors ==
Election	Councillor	Party
2015	Marc Hervé	PS
2015	Emmanuelle Rousset	PS
2021	Marc Hervé	PS
2021	Emmanuelle Rousset	PS

== Detailed election results ==
=== 2015 ===
The departmental elections of 2015 was held on 22 (first round) and 29 (second round) March 2019.

Candidates		Parties	First round		Second round	
Candidates		Parties	Votes	%	Votes	%
1	Marc Hervé	PS	3,812	36.18	5,657	55.74
1	Emmanuelle Rousset	PS	3,812	36.18	5,657	55.74
2	Amélie Dhalluin	UMP	3,355	31.85	4,492	44.26
2	Philippe Le Bouec	DVD	3,355	31.85	4,492	44.26
3	Xavier Baron	EÉLV	1,345	12.77		
3	Martine Foubert-Brulon	EÉLV	1,345	12.77		
4	Loïc de Fleurelle	FN	1,115	10.58		
4	Marina Martin	FN	1,115	10.58		
5	Tiffany Coisnard	PG	755	7.17		
5	Cédric Peinturier	PCF	755	7.17		
6	Fabien Ramel	S&P*	153	1.45		
6	Chérine Sultan	S&P	153	1.45		
Registered voters			22,372	100.00	22,371	100.00
Not voted			11,500	51.4	11,616	51.92
Turnout			10,872	48.6	10,755	48.08
Blank ballots			248	1.11	420	1.88
Invalid ballots			89	0.4	186	0.83
Valid votes			10,535	47.09	10,149	45.37
* Solidarity and progress (Solidarité et progrès)

=== 2021 ===
The departmental election of 2021 was held on 20 (first round) and 27 (second round) June 2021.

Candidates		Parties	First round		Second round	
Candidates		Parties	Votes	%	Votes	%
1	Marc Hervé	PS	2,249	28.24	4,640	58.28
1	Emmanuelle Rousset	PS	2,249	28.24	4,640	58.28
2	Charles Compagnon	DVD	2,263	28.42	3,321	41.72
2	Amélie Dhalluin	LR	2,263	28.42	3,321	41.72
3	Sébastien Branellec	EÉLV	2,152	27.02		
3	Haud Leguen	EÉLV	2,152	27.02		
4	Énora Le Pape	LFI	681	8.55		
4	Jean-Paul Tual	LFI	681	8.55		
5	Franck-Christophe Beaufrère	RN	618	7.76		
5	Charlotte de Bogeron	RN	618	7.76		
Registered voters			22,611	100.00	22,611	100.00
Not voted			14,455	63.93	14,194	62.77
Turnout			8,156	36.07	8,417	37.23
Blank ballots			117	0.52	306	1.35
Invalid ballots			76	0.34	150	0.66
Valid votes			7,963	35.22	7,961	35.21
