= Canton of Rennes-4 =

Coordinates: 48.11°N 1.68°W

- Canton
- Country: France
- Region: Brittany
- Department: Ille-et-Vilaine
- No. of communes: {{{nbcomm}}}
- Population (2023): 38,372
- INSEE code: 35 21

The canton of Rennes-4 is an administrative division of the Ille-et-Vilaine department, in northwestern France. It was created at the French canton reorganisation which came into effect in March 2015. Its seat is in Rennes.

The canton is entirely included in the commune of Rennes.
