= Ille-et-Vilaine =

Department of France

Ille-et-Vilaine Ill-e-Vilaenn (Gallo) Il-ha-Gwilen (Breton)
- Department of France
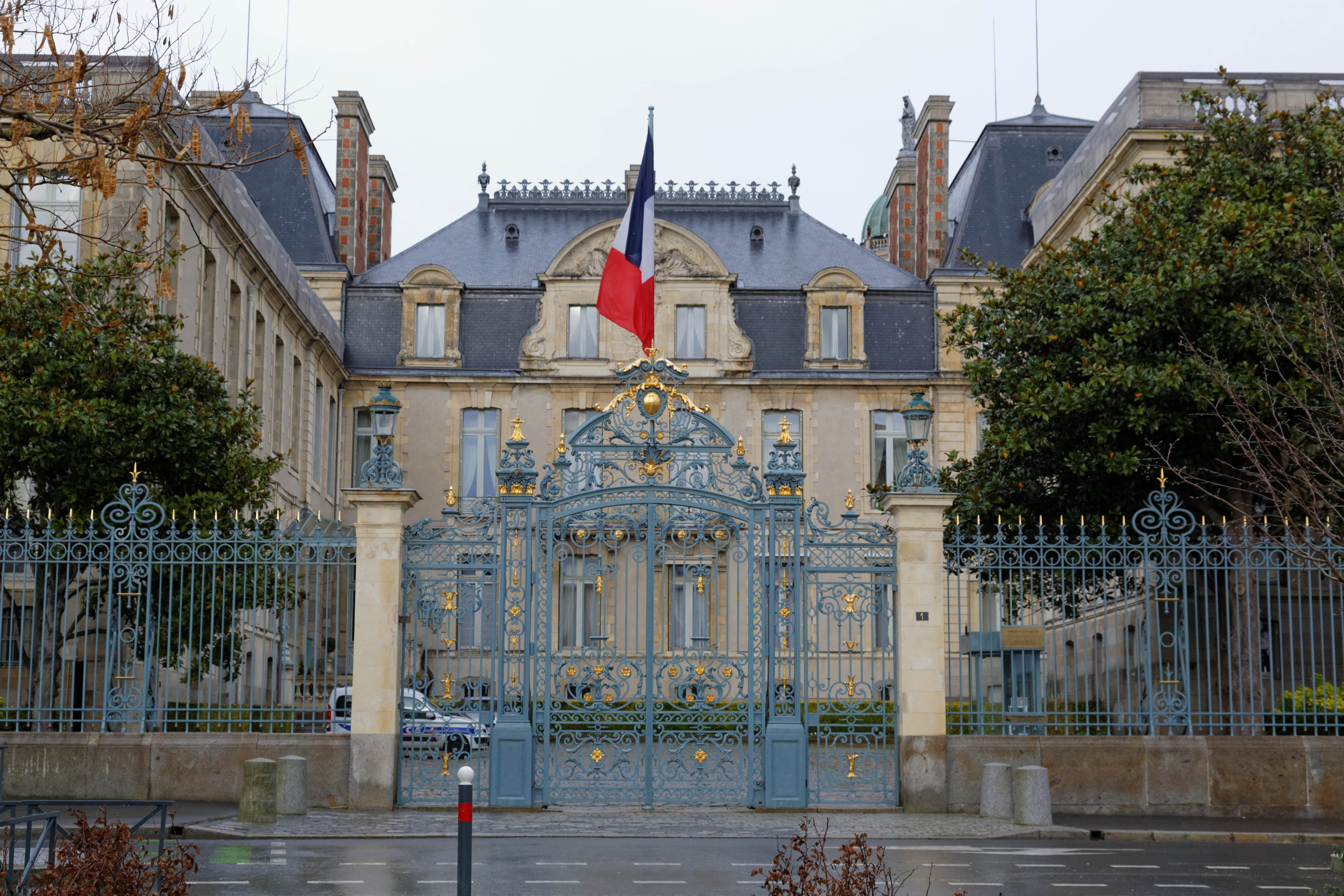
- Prefecture building in Rennes

- Flag Coat of arms

- Location of Ille-et-Vilaine in France
- Coordinates: 48°10′N 01°40′W
- Country: France
- Region: Brittany
- Prefecture: Rennes
- Subprefectures: Fougères; Redon; Saint-Malo

Government
  - President of the Departmental Council: Jean-Luc Chenut (PS)

Area^{1}
  - Total: 6,775 km^{2} (2,616 sq mi)

Population (2023)
  - Total: 1,120,666
  - Rank: 21st
  - Density: 165.4/km^{2} (428.4/sq mi)
- Time zone: UTC+1 (CET)
  - Summer (DST): UTC+2 (CEST)
- ISO 3166 code: FR-35
- Department number: 35
- Arrondissements: 4
- Cantons: 27
- Communes: 332
- ^1 French Land Register data, which exclude estuaries, and lakes, ponds, and glaciers larger than 1 km^{2}

Ille-et-Vilaine (French: [il e vilɛn]; Gallo: Ill-e-Vilaenn; Breton: Il-ha-Gwilen; lit. 'Ille and Vilaine') is a department of France, located in the Brittany region in the northwest of the country. It is named after its two main rivers, the Ille and the Vilaine. Its prefecture is Rennes, with subprefectures in Fougères, Redon and Saint-Malo. It had a population of 1,120,666 in 2023.

== History ==
Ille-et-Vilaine is one of the original 83 departments created during the French Revolution on 4 March 1790. It was created from part of the province of Brittany.

== Geography ==
Ille-et-Vilaine is a part of the current region of Brittany and it is bordered by the departments of Manche to the north-east, Mayenne to the east, Maine-et-Loire to the south-east, Loire-Atlantique to the south, Morbihan to the south-west, and Côtes-d'Armor to the west and north-west – France's shortest administrative department boundary at 20 yards (19 metres), although this was not the case with the department boundary. Also the English Channel (la Manche in French) borders the department to the north. It is in Upper Brittany.

The department is named after its two main rivers, the Ille and the Vilaine, whose confluence is in Rennes, the capital of the department and of the region. Other important rivers include:

- the Rance, that borders the department in the north-west and flows to the north, creating a deep fjord before reaching the English Channel on the western part of the coast (named Côte d'Émeraude) between the cities of Dinard and Saint-Malo); the Rance river is connected from the west of the department to the Ille river in the north-west suburbs of Rennes with a navigable channel (then the Ille river is channelized to join the Vilaine up to the center of the city of Rennes);
- and the Couesnon that borders the eastern part of the department and which reaches the eastern part of the coast of the English Channel, in the flat Bay of the Mont Saint-Michel.

The department is moderately elevated above the level of the sea, with many hills; however the central part has a dense network of many tributaries to the Ille or the Vilaine from all around the large basin of Rennes. The elevated hills bordering this basin are covered by several old forests now exploited by men for the production of wood. The basin itself is a rich agriculture area, as well as the north-west of the department near the Rance.

In the extreme south of the department the Vilaine goes through a slower decrease in elevation in a small corridor in the area of the city of Redon; in this area, the Vilaine is known for its frequent floods during its recent history, often because of too-intensive draining of agricultural areas around Rennes (some floods also affected some parts of Rennes up to the 1980s due to incorrect management of old equipment of the canal of Ille-et-Rance). To avoid these hazards within inhabited cities, some natural fields bordering the Vilaine in the south of the department are now left floodable, and works for regulating the level have been done including, small artificial lakes with derivation channels, replanting trees in the basin, better management of forests, and regulating the artificial drains made for agriculture.

=== Principal towns ===
The most populous commune is Rennes, the prefecture. As of 2023, there are 6 communes with more than 15,000 inhabitants:

Commune	Population (2023)
Rennes	230,890
Saint-Malo	47,439
Fougères	20,307
Bruz	19,683
Vitré	19,365
Cesson-Sévigné	18,761

== Demographics ==
The population has grown steadily since the 1960s, reaching 1.1 million in 2023.

Population development since 1801:

Historical population

Year	Pop.	±% p.a.
1801	488,846	—
1821	533,207	+0.44%
1831	547,052	+0.26%
1841	549,217	+0.04%
1851	574,618	+0.45%
1861	584,930	+0.18%
1876	602,712	+0.20%
1881	615,480	+0.42%
1891	626,875	+0.18%
1901	614,000	−0.21%
1921	558,574	−0.47%
1936	566,000	+0.09%

Year	Pop.	±% p.a.
1946	578,246	+0.21%
1954	586,812	+0.18%
1962	614,268	+0.57%
1968	652,722	+1.02%
1975	702,199	+1.05%
1982	749,764	+0.94%
1990	798,718	+0.79%
1999	867,533	+0.92%
2007	955,846	+1.22%
2012	1,007,901	+1.07%
2017	1,060,199	+1.02%
2023	1,120,666	+0.93%

== Language ==
Gallo is a historic minority language spoken in eastern Brittany. Gallo and Breton are both studied at the University of Rennes.

=== Breton ===
Historically, the Breton language was little spoken in the eastern part of Brittany, and this was one of the first regions where the language disappeared such that Breton was not spoken for many centuries.

Today, Breton is again spoken due to schools teaching Breton, and due to a small immigration from Western Brittany to Eastern Brittany, where there are more cities with growing industries and external investment and therefore more work. A recent study shows that Breton speakers in this region represent 3.3% of the total number of Breton speakers. The Breton speakers aged 18–30 in this region represent 12.7% of the total number of Breton speakers of that age group. This is because there are relatively few elder speakers but many people are learning the language. The study says that about 1,800 people are learning it (this includes one Diwan school in Rennes, some bilingual public and catholic schools, and evening courses).

== Politics ==
=== Local politics ===
The city of Rennes and its suburbs are the original base of the rapid Socialist growth in the department. The city has been governed by Socialist mayors since 1977, notably by Edmond Hervé between 1977 and 2008. Since then, the growth of middle-class suburbs have helped the Socialists, who have been rapidly gaining strength in those formerly right-leaning areas.

The right remains strong in a strongly Catholic (clerical) area from outside Redon to Vitré or Fougères. In addition, the right is strong in the wealthy coastal area of Saint-Malo and Dinard.

=== Departmental council ===
The President of the Departmental Council of Ille-et-Vilaine has been the Socialist Jean-Luc Chenut since 2015, re-elected in 2021.

Party		Seats
•	Socialist Party	12
•	Miscellaneous left	7
•	The Ecologists	7
•	Radical Party	2
•	Independent	2
•	French Communist Party	1
•	Breton Democratic Union	1
	Miscellaneous right	14
	The Republicans	4
	Union of Democrats and Independents	1
	MoDem	1
	Agir	1
	Renaissance	1

=== Presidential elections results (2nd round) since 1995 ===
Election	Winning candidate	Party	%	2nd place candidate	Party	%
2022	Emmanuel Macron	LREM	70.94	Marine Le Pen	FN	29.06
2017	Emmanuel Macron	LREM	77.67	Marine Le Pen	FN	22.33
2012	François Hollande	PS	55.71	Nicolas Sarkozy	UMP	44.29
2007	Ségolène Royal	PS	52.39	Nicolas Sarkozy	UMP	47.61
2002	Jacques Chirac	RPR	89.82	Jean-Marie Le Pen	FN	10.18
1995	Jacques Chirac	RPR	51.19	Lionel Jospin	PS	48.81

=== Representation in Paris ===
==== In the National Assembly ====
Constituency	Member	Party
Ille-et-Vilaine's 1st	Marie Mesmeur	LFI
Ille-et-Vilaine's 2nd	Tristan Lahais	G·s
Ille-et-Vilaine's 3rd	Claudia Rouaux	PS
Ille-et-Vilaine's 4th	Mathilde Hignet	LFI
Ille-et-Vilaine's 5th	Christine Cloarec	RE
Ille-et-Vilaine's 6th	Thierry Benoit	HOR
Ille-et-Vilaine's 7th	Jean-Luc Bourgeaux	LR
Ille-et-Vilaine's 8th	Mickaël Bouloux	PS

==== In the Senate ====
Senator	Party	Since
Dominique de Legge	LR	2008
Anne-Sophie Patru	UDI	2024
Sylvie Robert	PS	2014
Daniel Salmon	LE	2020

== Tourism ==
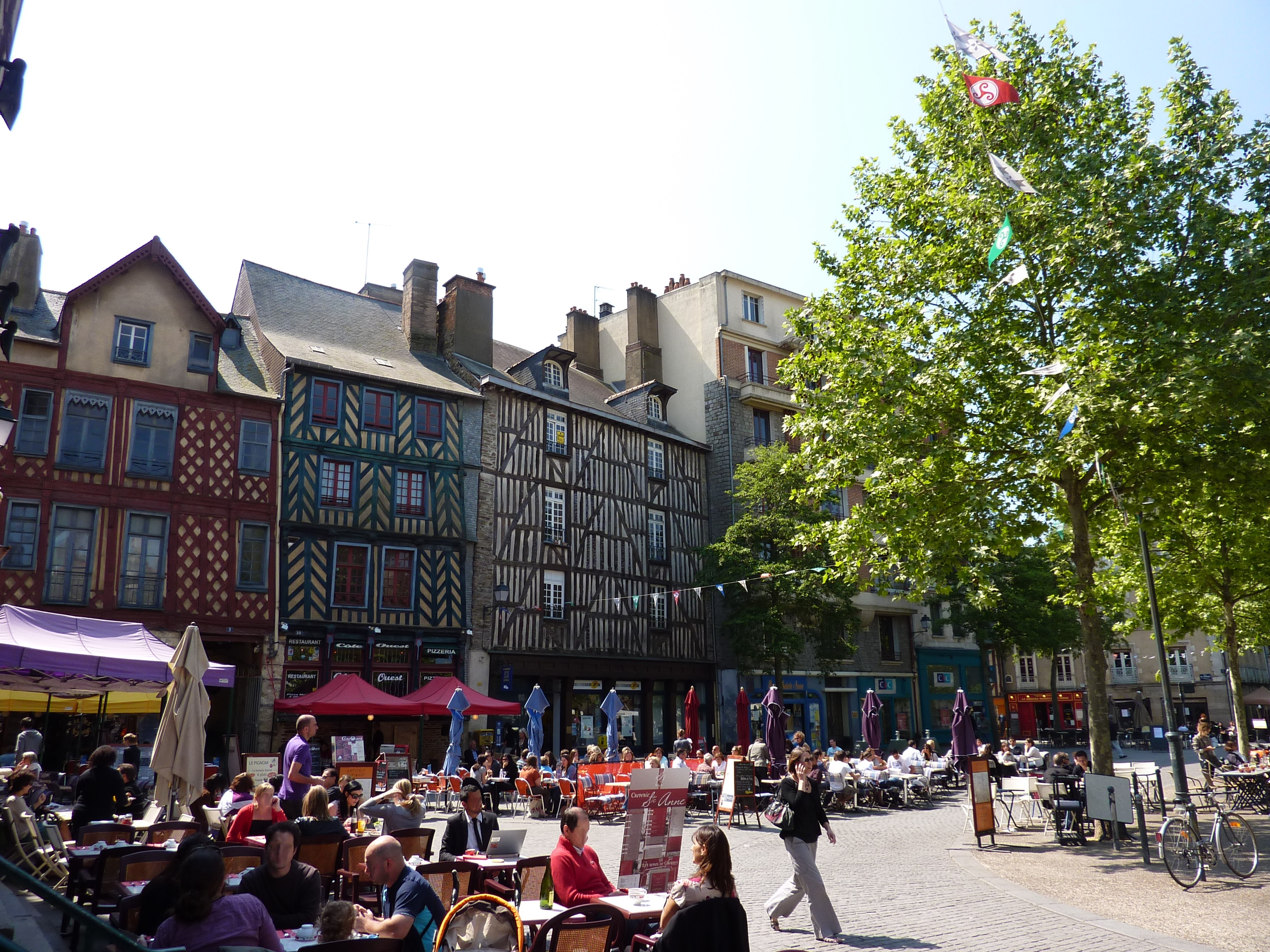
Rennes city centre

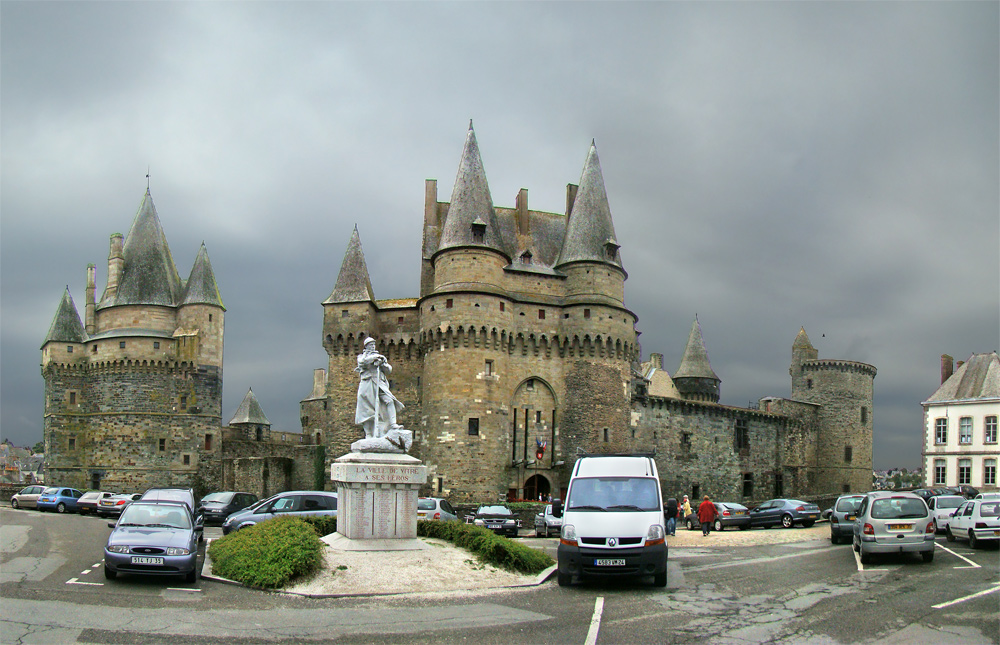
The medieval town of Vitré

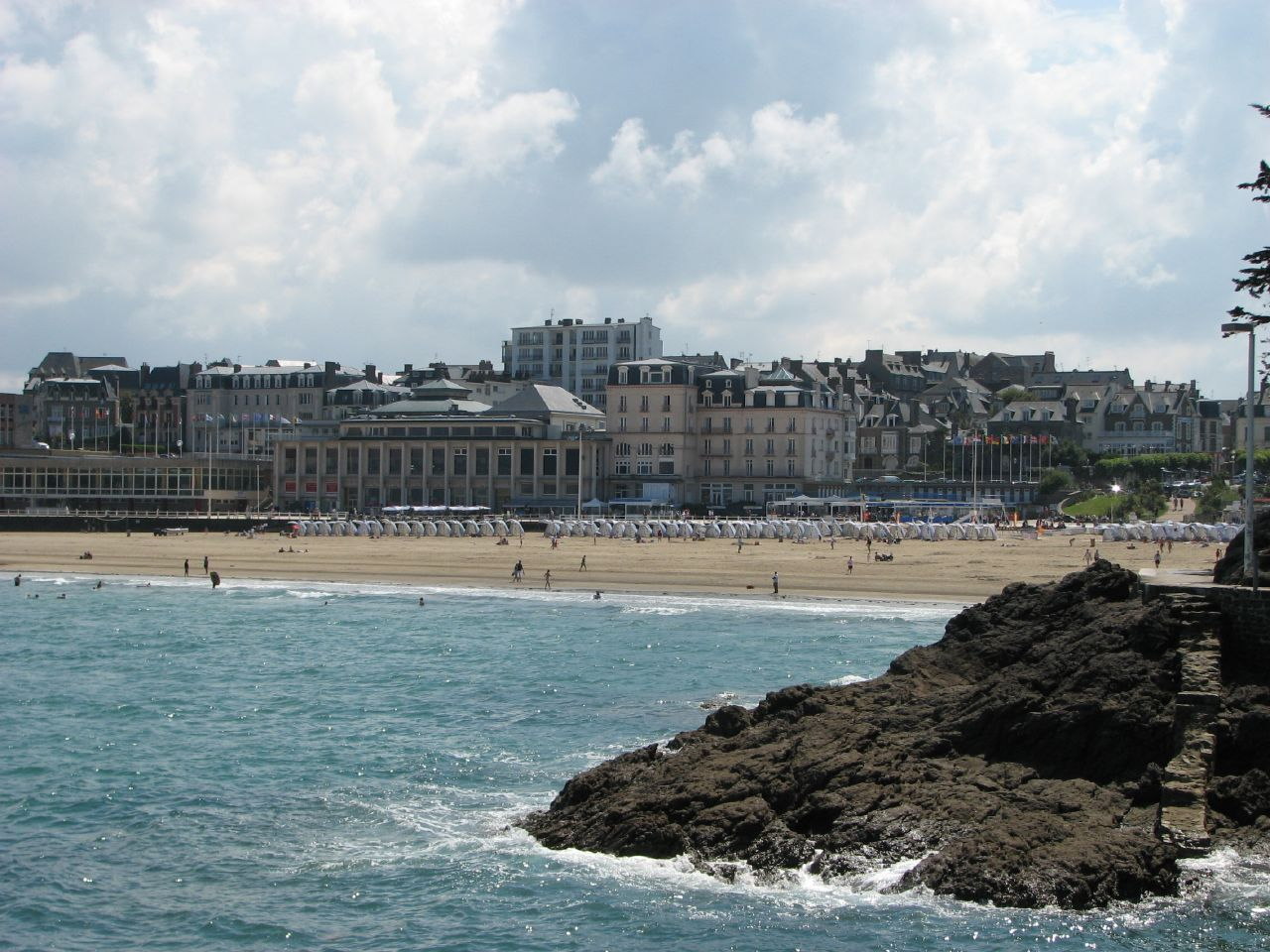
Plage de l'Écluse in Dinard

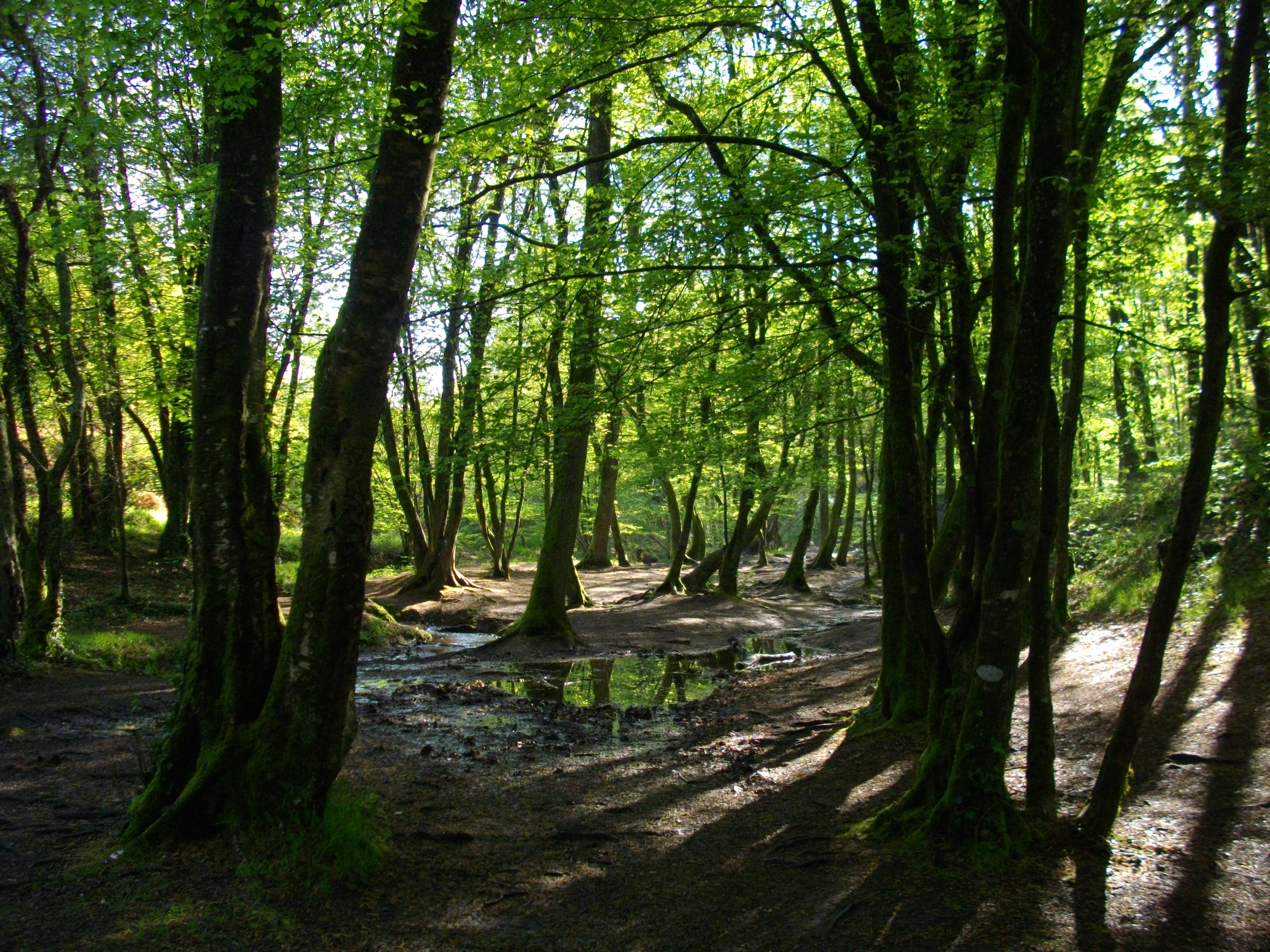
Legendary forest of Brocéliande in Paimpont

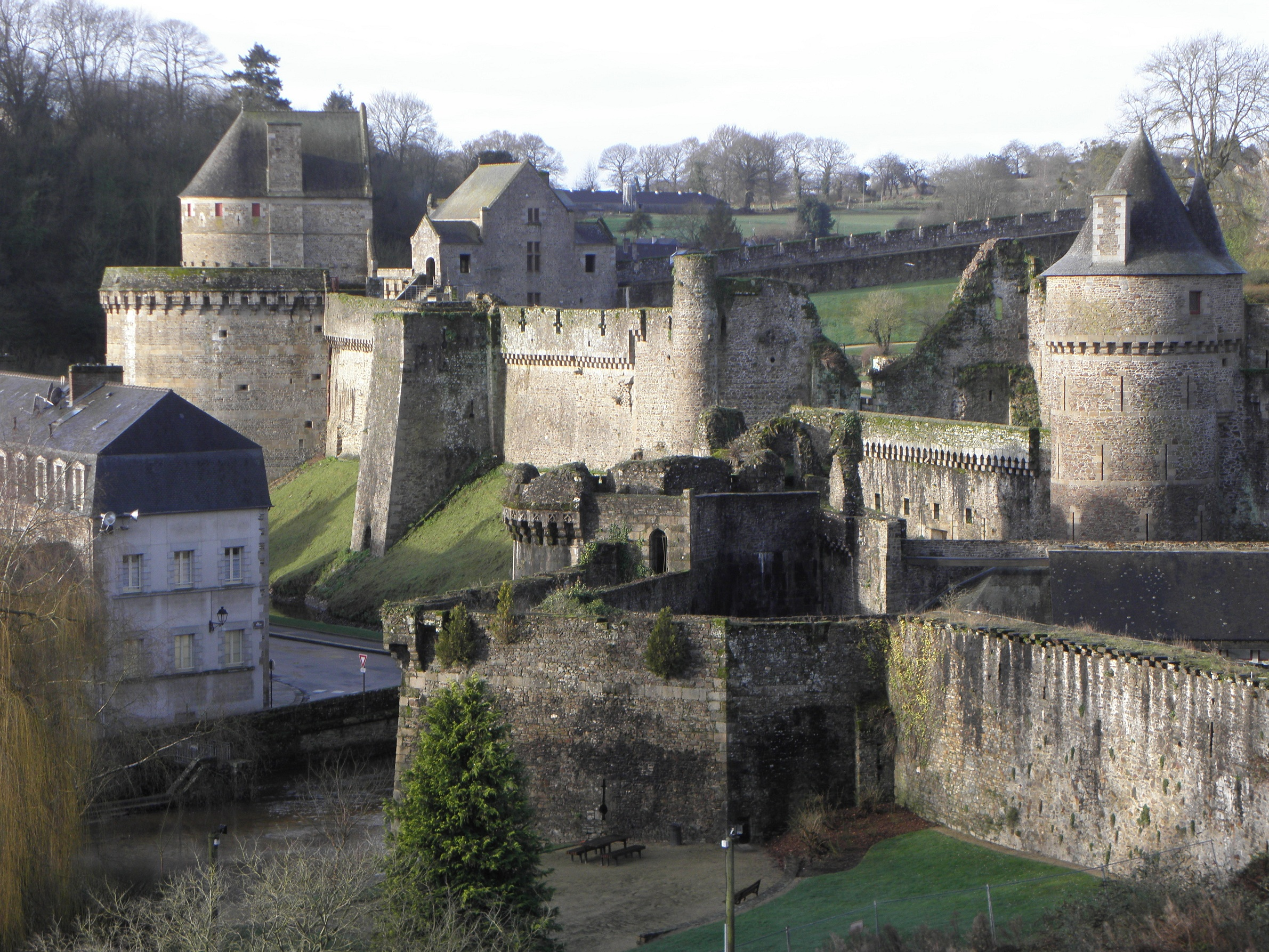
Château de Fougères

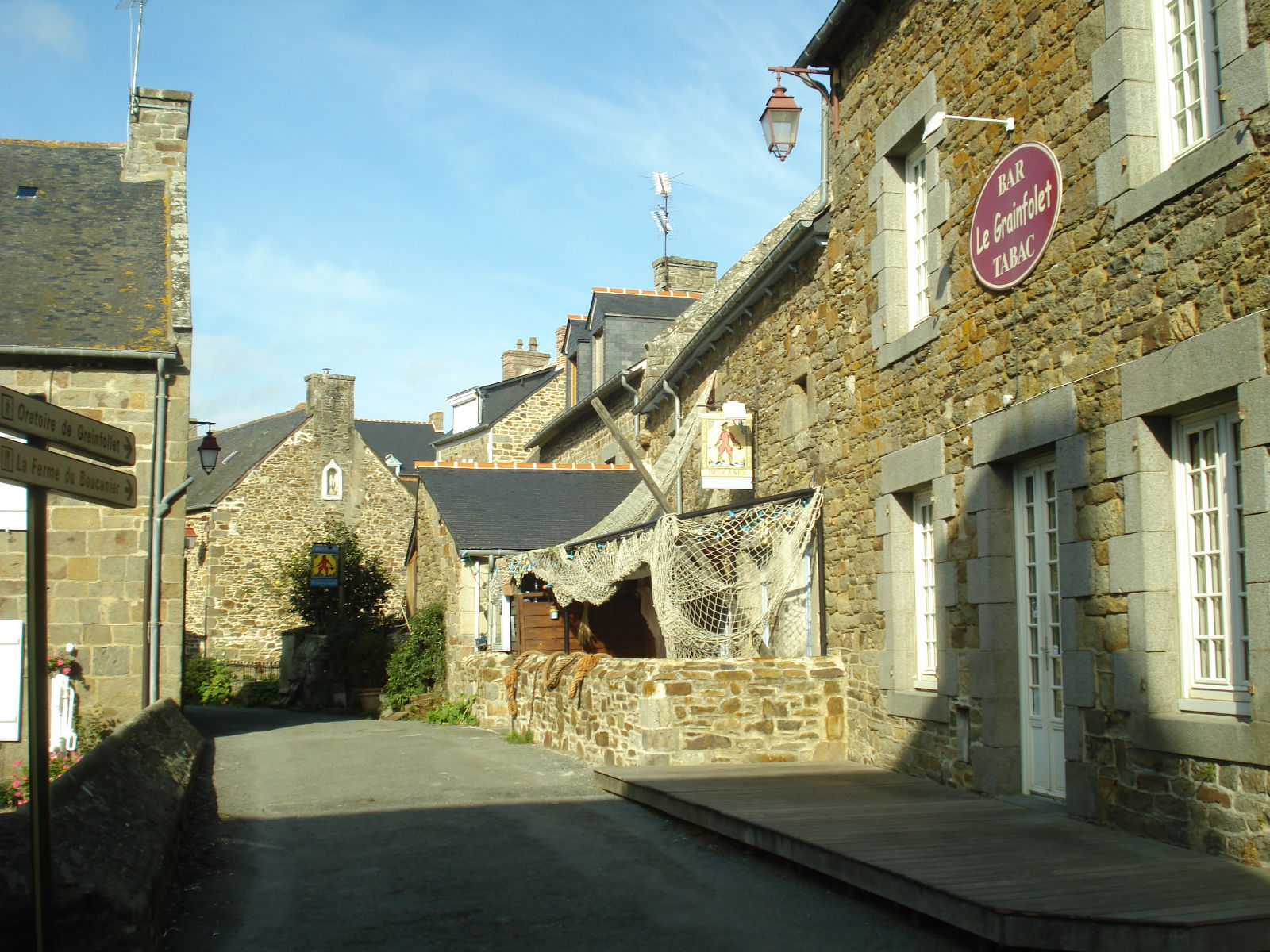
The fishing village of Saint-Suliac

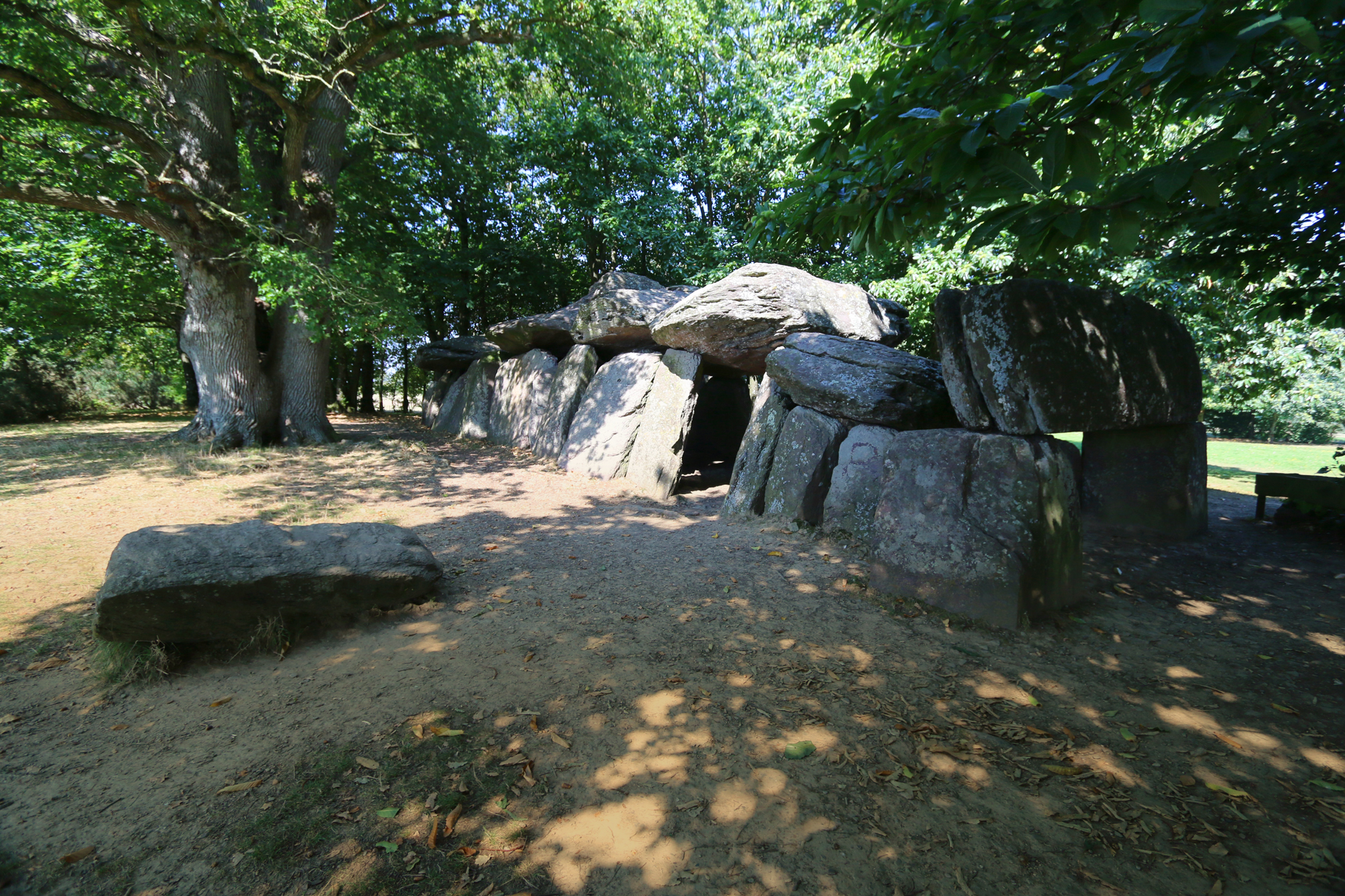
Stone row La Roche aux fées in Essé

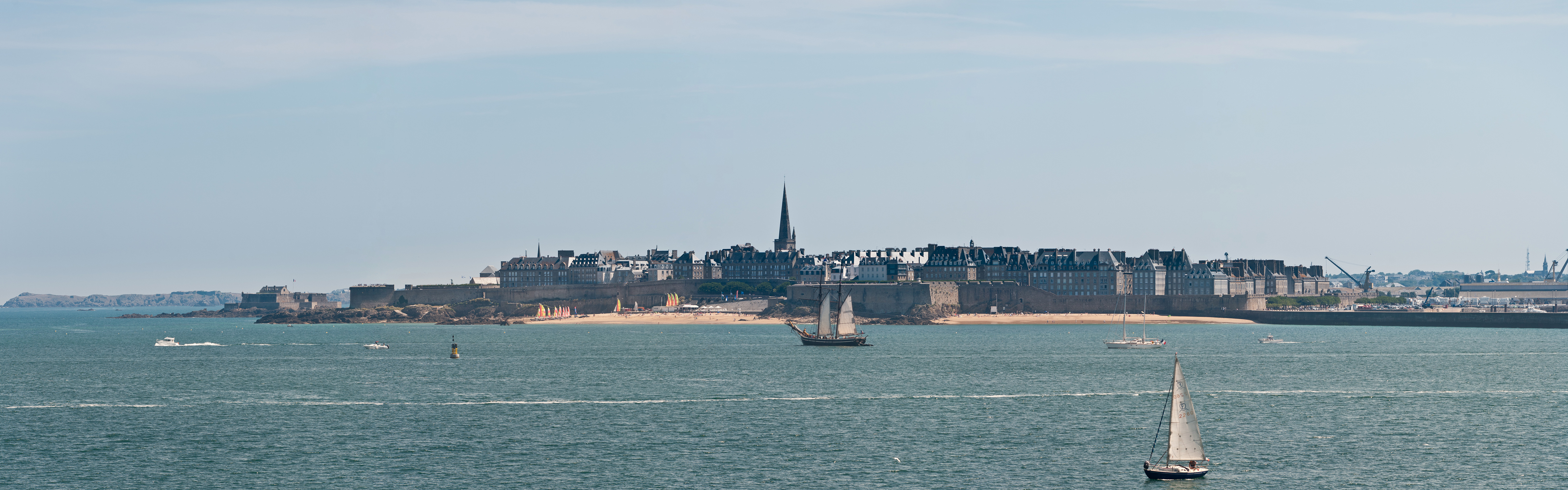
Saint-Malo, the Corsairs' stronghold, view of the walled city from the south-west

== See also ==
- Cantons of the Ille-et-Vilaine department
- Communes of the Ille-et-Vilaine department
- Arrondissements of the Ille-et-Vilaine department
- Saint-Sauveur Abbey Church of Redon
