= Emmanuel-Marie Blain de Saint-Aubin =

Emmanuel-Marie Blain de Saint-Aubin (30 June 1833 – 9 July 1883) was an educator, songwriter, story-teller, and translator. He was born in Rennes, France, and arrived in Canada East probably in 1859.
