= Jean-Marie Valentin =

French architect and sculptor (1823–1896)

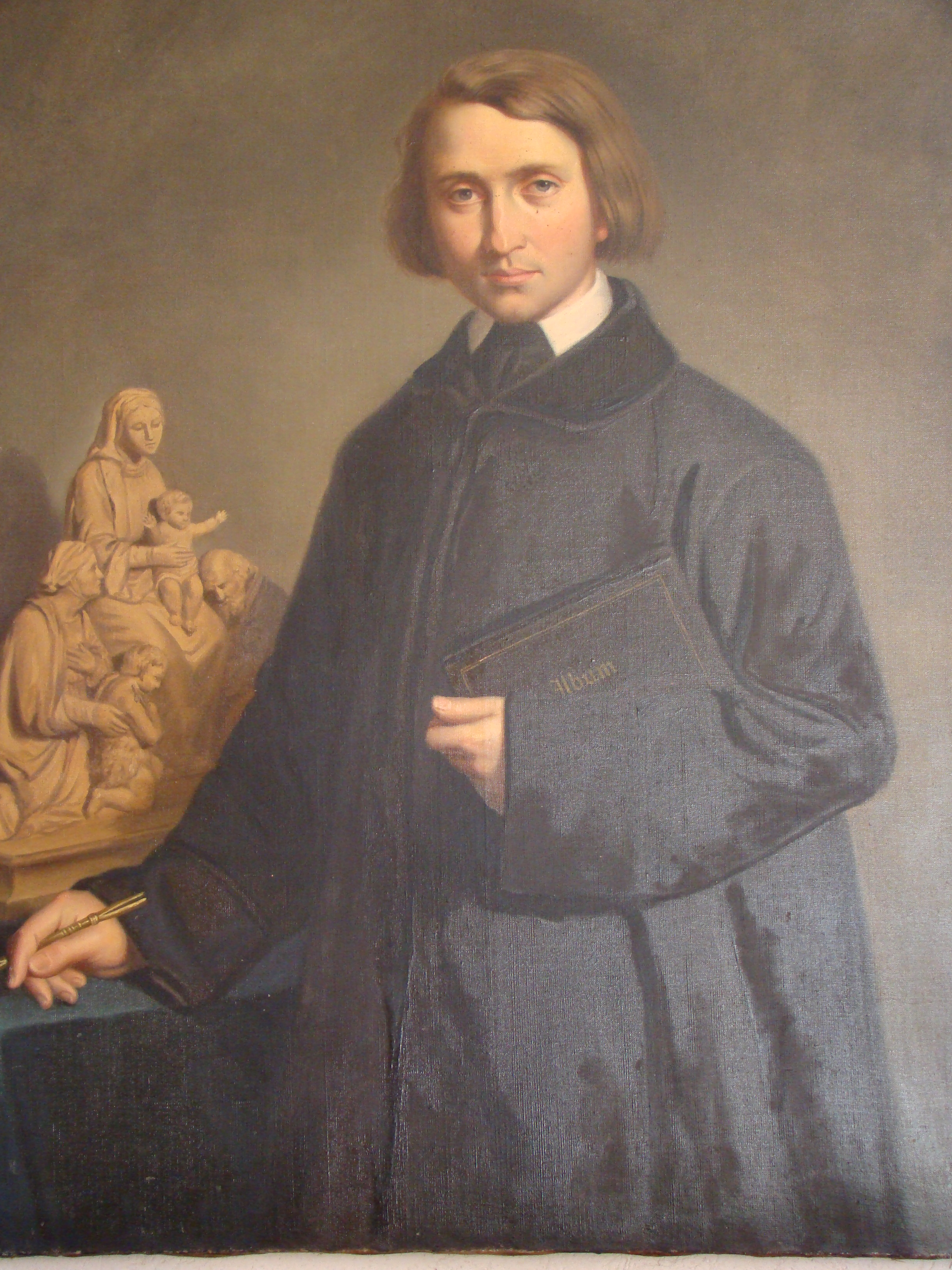
A portrait of Jean-Marie Valentin by Léon Brune

Jean-Marie Valentin (French: [ʒɑ̃maʁi valɑ̃tɛ̃]; 17 October 1823 – 8 August 1896) was a French architect and sculptor specialising in religious furnishings such as pulpits, altars and statues.

Born in Bourg-des-Comptes, Ille-et-Vilaine, he died in the 6th arrondissement of Paris at age 72. His father Antoine Louis Valentin (born 1784) was a master carpenter working mostly in ebony. Jean-Marie first worked at his father's workshop.

In 1842, he studied at the École Municipale de Dessin et Sculpture in Rennes (this became the École Régionale des Beaux-Arts in 1881). He was taught sculpture by Jean-Baptiste Barré. In 1845, he received a bursary from the city of Rennes and travelled to Paris where he worked at a studio together with a Rennes sculptor called François Lanno. He then worked at the studio of François Rude. In around 1850 he settled back in Rennes and started to specialise in church furnishings. His works are numerous and can be seen throughout Ille-et-Vilaine.

His first masterpiece was the pulpit erected in the Église Sainte-Croix à Saint-Servan, a suburb of Saint-Malo). This had been promoted and funded by Napoleon III during his visit to Brittany in 1858. During this visit, the church's curate, Monsieur Huchet, had brought the church to the Emperor's attention, highlighting the fact that it lacked furnishings. The Emperor was generous and the pulpit was the result. Jean-Marie was assisted by his brother Antoine, as was often the case, and the pulpit was indeed signed "Valentin Frères, Architectes et sculpteurs". Many years later Valentin completed the memorial to Huchet in the Saint-Malo cathedral.

Perhaps his best-known work was on the Saint-Yves funeral monument in the cathedral at Tréguier. For this work he received a prize in 1888 from the "Salon des Artistes français" where it was shown before installation in the cathedral.

== Works ==
=== Église paroissiale Saint-Jean-Baptiste ===
For this church in Ercé-près-Liffré's place de l'Eglise, Valentin created the work "Education de la Vierge" in 1861.

=== Cathédrale Saint-Samson, place de la Cathédrale (Dol-de-Bretagne) ===
Valentin executed the altar and altarpiece dedicated to saint Gilduin de Chartres and saint Méen in this cathedral in 1873. The wall behind the altar is painted with medallions in quinconce holding the letters "S.G" and "S.M.", these surrounded by a neo-gothic frieze painted by the Rennes artist Lemoine. The altar includes a bronze reliquary by Placide Poussièlgue-Rusand and a small terra cotta figure of a hermit by an unknown artist. Valentin also worked on the Sacré Coeur altar in the cathedral but not the four statues which form part of the altar. Two of these statues, those of saint Peter and saint Paul, are by the sculptor Robert Froc. Another altar in Dol cathedral by Valentin is that dedicated to saint Gilles and saint Roch and it is thought that the statues of Gilles, Roch and saint Thuriau de Dol are possibly the work of Valentin but this is not clear. Also in the cathedral is Valentin's statue of 1872 entitled "l'Education de la Vierge". This was at one time part of the altar and altarpiece dedicated to Sainte-Anne by the sculptor Augerie executed in 1899 but taken down in 1975. In 1876, Valentin also worked on the cathedral's Saint Michel altar and altarpiece. Apart from the statue of Saint Michel, the work also includes a statue of Saint Louis and Saint Sebastian.

=== Église paroissiale Saint-Martin ===
For this parish church in Hédé, Valentin executed a statue of saint Joseph in 1866.

=== Église paroissiale Sainte-Trinité ===
For this church in Saint-Thual, Jean-Marie Valentin worked on the saint Joseph altar in 1874. Some scholars also attribute Valentin with the works in this church "Saint Joseph et l'Enfant", the statues of Sainte Philomène, saints Méen and Tugdual and the work "Vierge à l'Enfant" but this attribution is not 100% certain.

=== Église paroissiale Saint-Malo ===
For this church in Le Minihic-sur-Rance's place de l' Église rue du Général de Gaulle, Valentin created the main altar in stone in 1867 decorated with a sculpted group in plaster representing the Assumption ("Assomption de la Vierge"). Ten years later Valentin produced a similar composition in stone for the Église Sainte-Croix de Saint-Servan (Saint-Malo). The composition is thought to have been inspired by the painting by Nicolas Poussin.

=== Église Saint-Sulpice ===
For this church in Montreuil-le-Gast, Valentin executed a limestone altarpiece for the main altar. It comprised a cavalry with angels placed on either side. The work dates to 1861. For the same church, Valentin created the altarpiece for the main altar.

=== Chapelle du collège Saint Martin in Rennes ===
Valentin carved the tympanum above the chapel's entrance. It depicts Saint Martin giving his cloak to a beggar.

=== Other works ===
- For the church in Renazé Valentin created the "Saint Rosaire" altar, several statues and two bas-reliefs.
- For the church in Brusvily Valentn created three altars and a pulpit carved from stone.
- For the church in Forges la Forêt Valentin created three altars decorated with statues and bas-reliefs.
- For the church in Brain sur les Marches Valentin created two altars in stone, some bas-reliefs and several statues.

=== Memorials to notable clerics ===
Valentin was commissioned to create several memorial monuments to notable churchmen. These include the memorial to Abbé Huchet in Saint Malo cathedral, to Aubrée in Vitré, to Fouré in La Guerche de Bretagne and to Meslé at the base of the tower of Notre Dame in Rennes. He also executed two memorials to Monseigneur Brossay Saint Marc, one in Bourg des Comptes and the other in Rennes cathedral. He also executed the maquette for the monument to Monseigneur Gonindard in Rennes cathedral. He died before the monument was completed but this was completed by his workshop.

=== Memorial to Abbé Aubrée ===
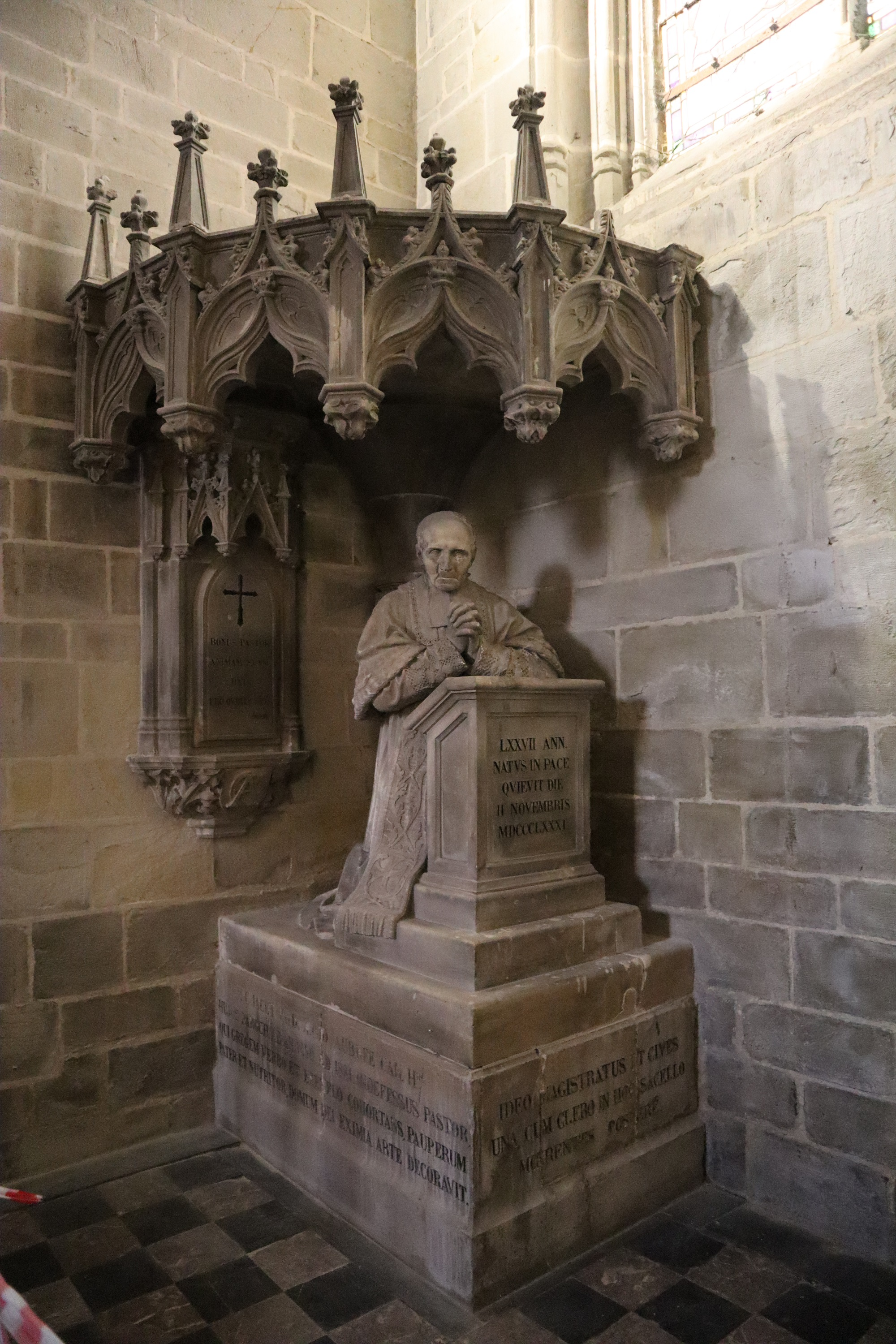
The monument to l'Abbé Aubré by Jean-Marie Valentin

For the Vitré Église Notre-Dame, Valentin created this memorial to Abbé Aubrée.

=== Memorial to Abbé Fourré ===
For the Basilique Notre-Dame-de-l'Assomption de La Guerche-de-Bretagne, Valentin executed the memorial to Abbé Fourré. He also created a large statue of saint Joseph for this church.

=== Memorial to the Vénérable Jean Eudes ===
For the Caen Église de Notre Dame, Valentin executed the memorial to the Vénérable Jean Eudes. This was inaugurated on 23 August 1885. Valentin depicts a kneeling Eudes at the feet of the Holy Virgin who holds the Infant Jesus in her arms.

=== Memorial to Curé Joseph Meslé ===
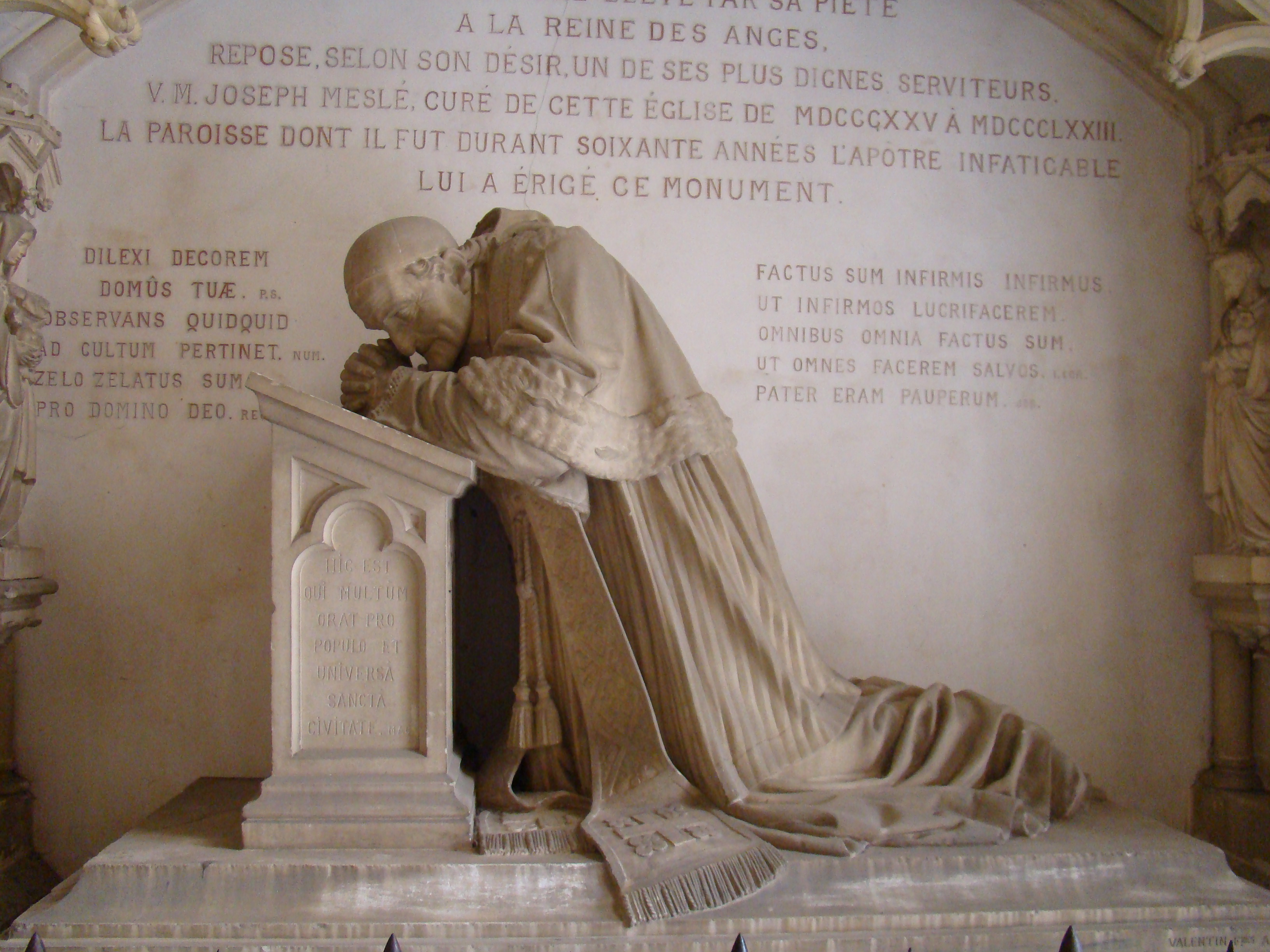
Valentin's monument to Curé Joseph Meslé in the Rennes Église Notre Dame

For the Église Notre Dame en Saint-Melaine in Rennes, Valentin executed a memorial to Curé Joseph Meslé in 1873. For this church Valentin also executed statues of saint Peter and saint Amand which decorate the church's tower.

=== Memorials to Monseigneur Brossay-Saint-Marc ===
Valentin created two memorials to Monseigneur Brossay-Saint-Marc. One is to be found in the Métropole Saint-Pierre Rennes and the other in Bourg-des-Comptes's Notre-Dame church. In the Métropole Saint-Pierre Rennes work, the cardinal is depicted on his knees, his hands clasped together in prayer. The work is in marble. The inauguration took place on 6 May 1884.

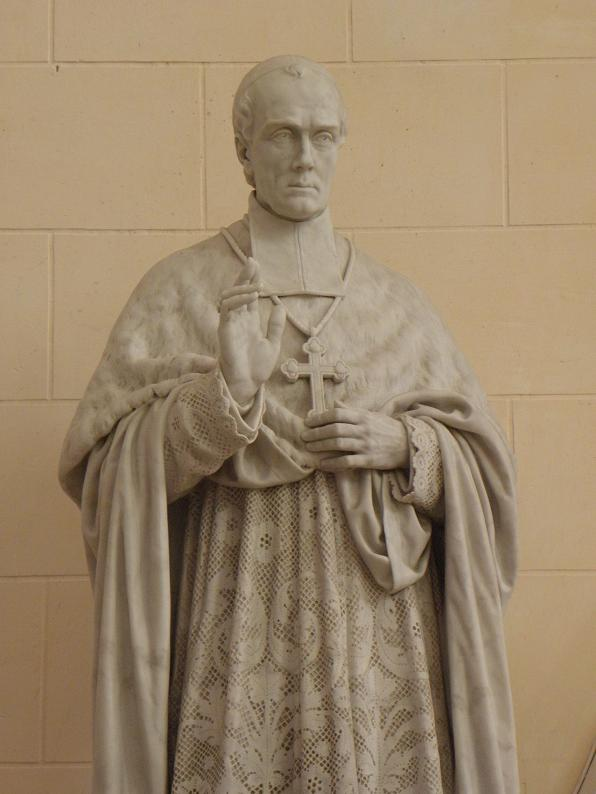
Monseigneur Brossay-Saint-Marc's memorial in Bourg-des-Comptes. This work was inaugurated on 19 September 1880.

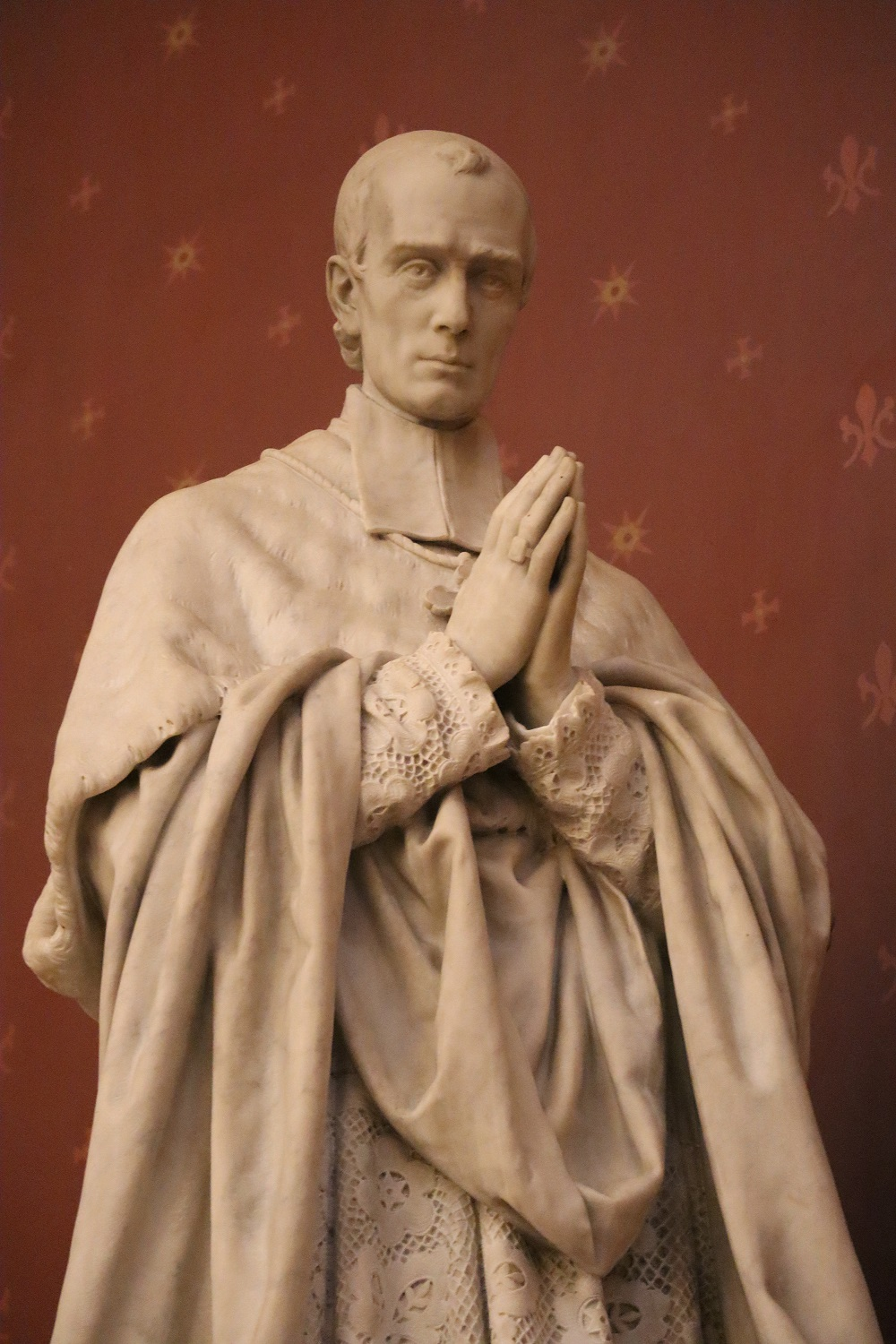
The monument to Monseigneur Brossay-Saint-Marc in Rennes.

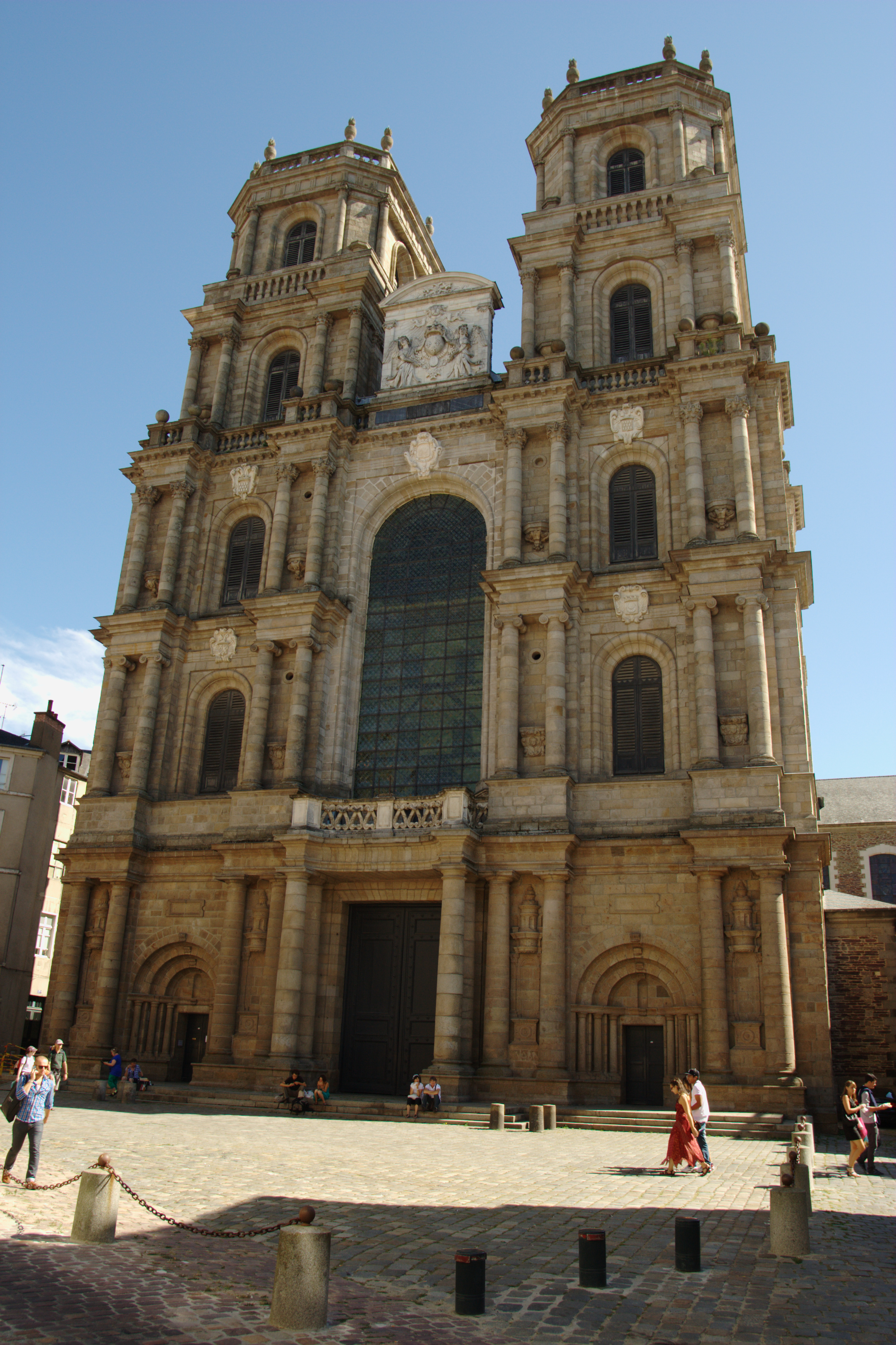
Saint Peter cathedral in Rennes.

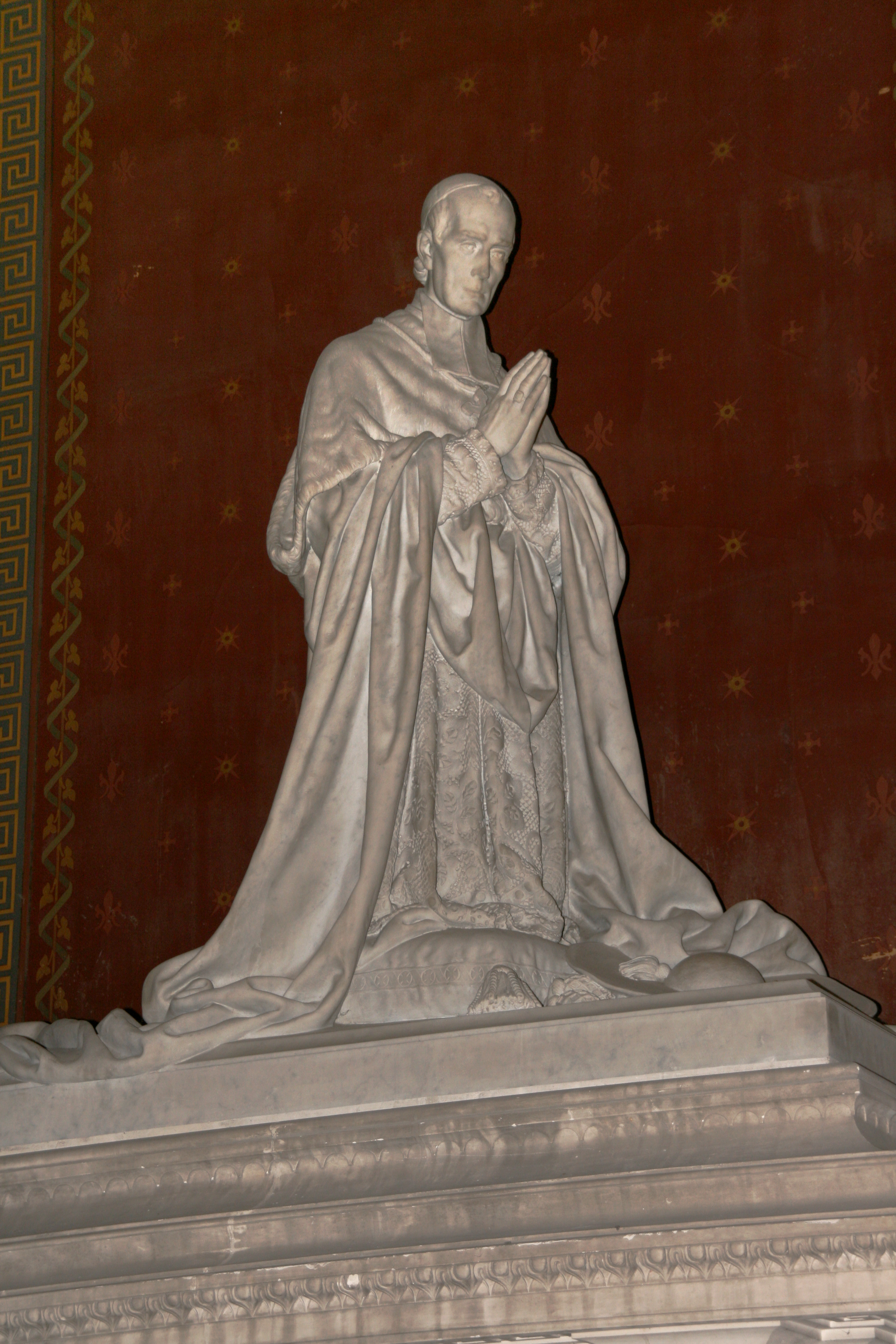
The monument to Monseigneur Brossay-Saint-Marc in Rennes.

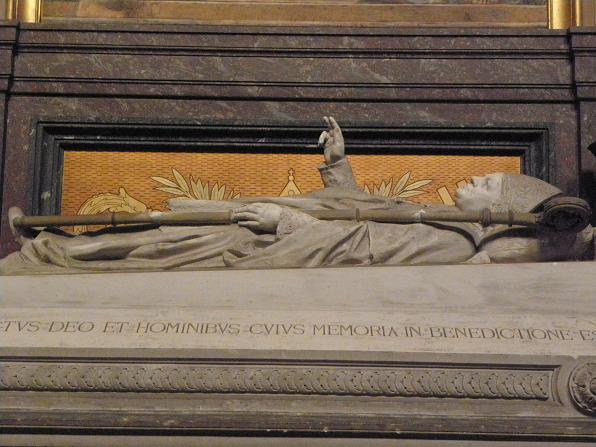
The tomb of Monseigneur Gonindard in Rennes.

=== Bain de Bretagne ===
The pulpit in Bain de Bretagne's church is by Valentin and regarded as one of his finest works. Carved in white stone it is decorated with bas-reliefs and ornate carvings. In the same church Valentin created the main altar with a bas-relief depicting the Last Supper. Side chapels in the church depict the descent from the cross and the "Bon Pasteur".

=== Église paroissiale Saint-Quentin ===
For this parish church in Saint-Ganton, Valentin completed the main altar.

=== Eglise paroissiale Sainte-Trinité, Saint-Augustin ===
This parish church in Plerguer has an altar by Valentin.

=== Église paroissiale Saint-Jean-Baptiste ===
For this parish church in Saint-Jouan-des-Guérets, Valentin executed a pulpit in 1880.

=== The Stations of the Cross in Rennes Cathedral ===
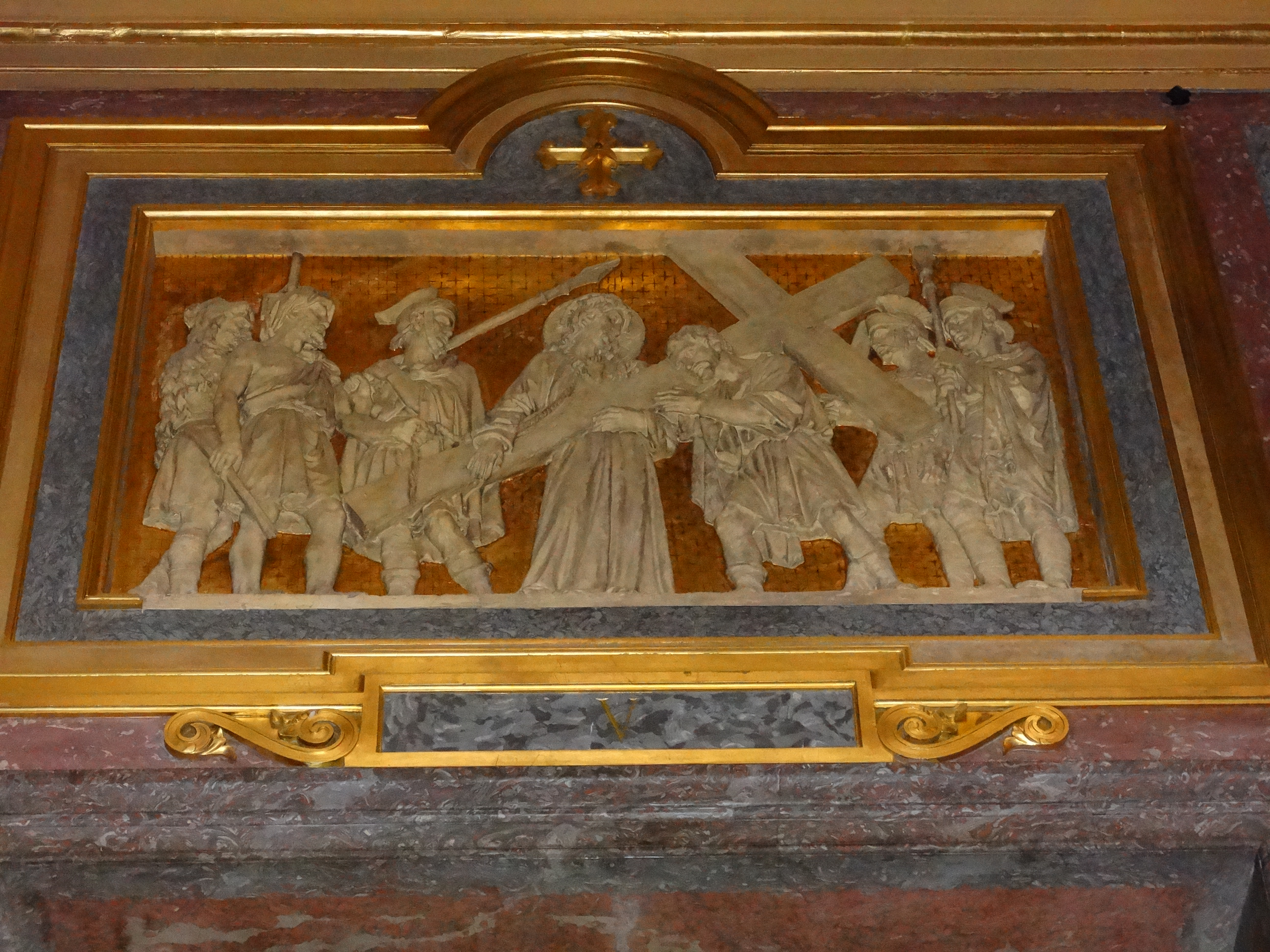
One of Valentin's Stations of the Cross in Rennes Cathedral

In the Rennes Cathedral, Valentin worked on the "Chemin de Croix" ("Stations of the Cross") from 1878 to 1883.

=== Église paroissiale Saint-Pierre ===
For this church in Plélan-le-Grand, Valentin executed many statues including Sainte Marguerite de Cortone, a "Dormition de la Vierge", a "Vierge à l'Enfant", Saint Jean, Saint Joseph, Saint Fiacre, Sainte Anne and the work "Sainte Anne obtient des guérisons". All these works date to 1859 and decorate side altars.

=== Église Sainte-Croix de Saint-Servan (Saint-Malo) ===
For this church and apart from the pulpit mentioned earlier, Valentin completed thirteen statues in 1863. Those in the nave depicted a "Mère des Douleurs", an "Ecce Homo", John the Evangelist, Francis de Sales, saintes Cecilia and Barbe, and saints Étienne and Godefroy, whilst those in the choir included Aaron and Melchisédech.

=== Église Notre Dame d'Emeraude ===
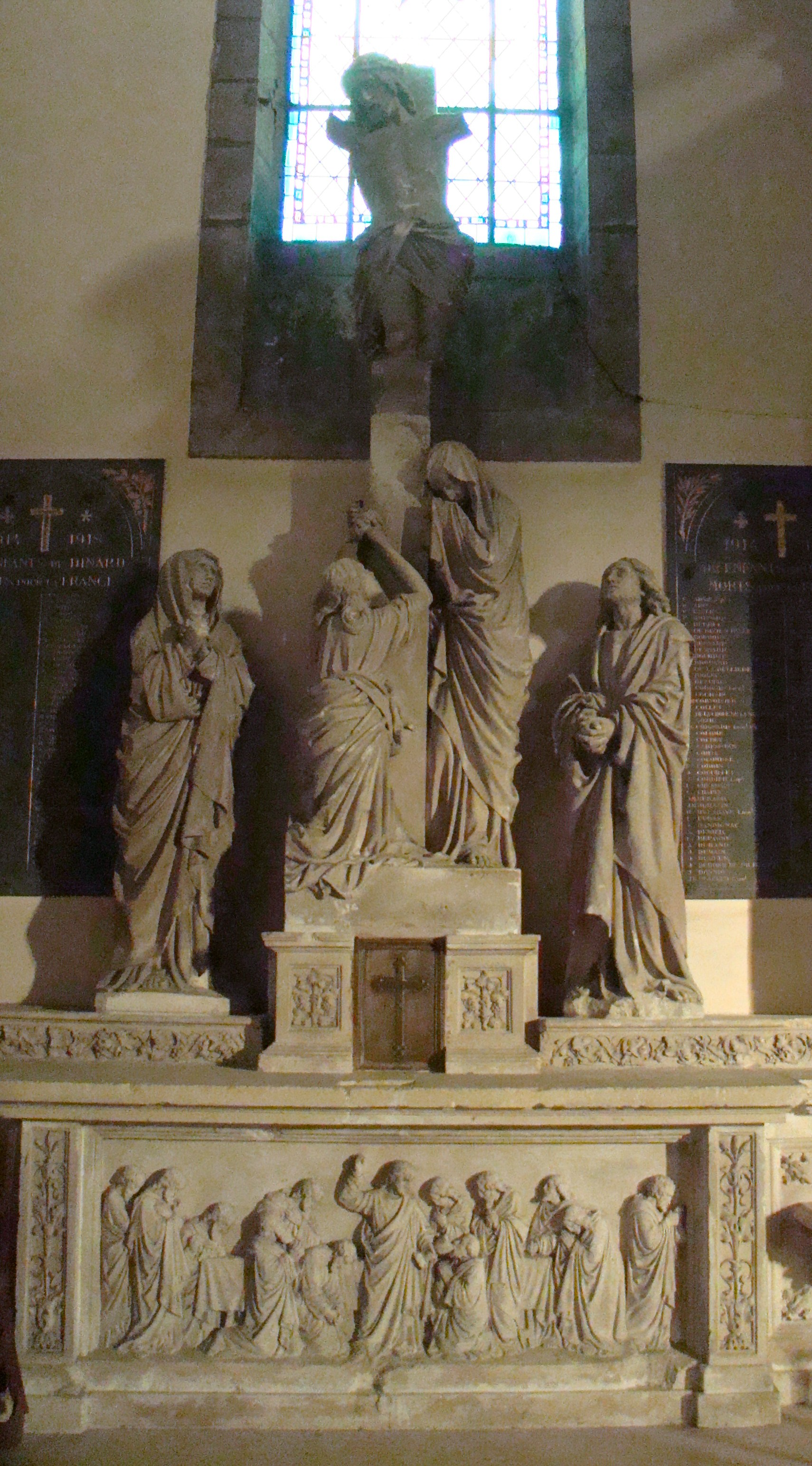
The remnants of Valentin's altar in Dinard's Église Saint-Enogat

For this church in Dinard Valentin created the main altar with a bas-relief depicting Jesus giving communion to his apostles. This was badly damaged during the 1944 bombings but is still kept standing in the church. The composition includes large statues of Saint Enogat and Saint Clément, the patron saints of the parish. For the same church Valentin created the pulpit decorated with three large statues, several statuettes and bas-reliefs.

=== La cathédrale de Tréguier ===
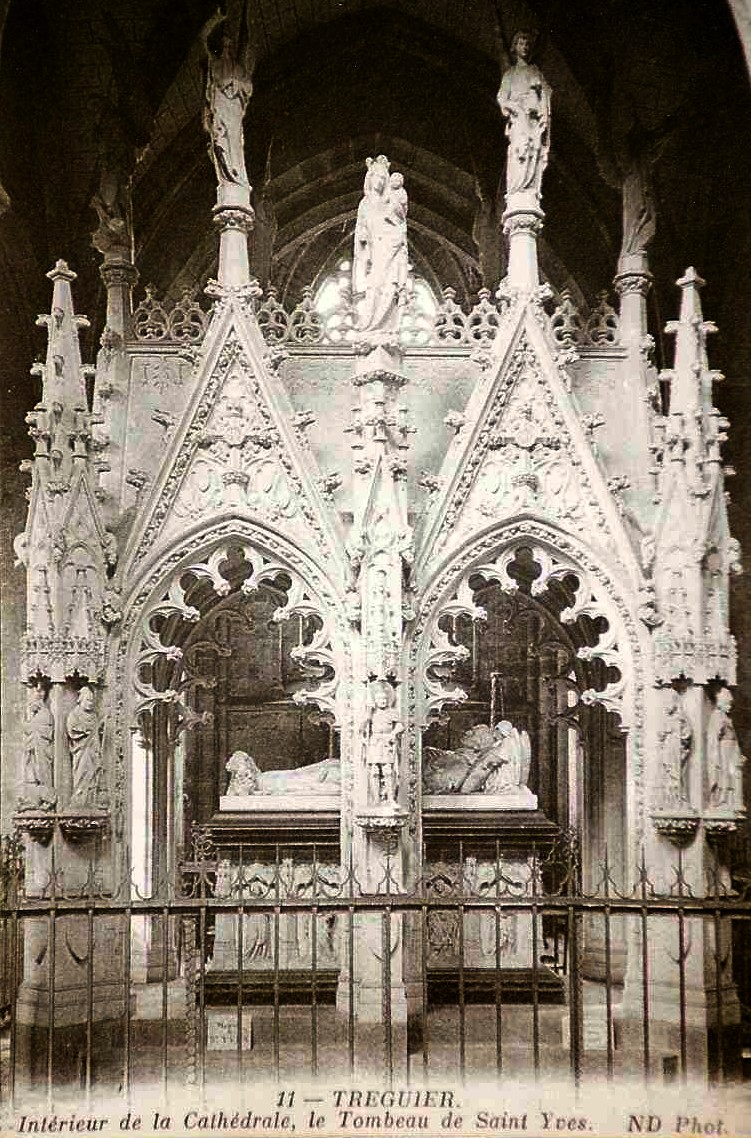
The tomb of Saint Yves by Jean-Maire Valentin

This work of 1890 is perhaps Valentin's most famous work. The original tomb in Tréguier cathedral had been destroyed during the French Revolution. The work is carved from white stone apart from the steps and table which are granite. Saint Yves lies in the centre of the work and around him are more than fifty smaller figures. Yves is presented lying on a chest which serves as a sarcophagus. He is clothed in his great white cloak, his shoulders are covered with his chaperone whilst his head resting on a piece of rock supported by two angels. The surrounding figures include his parents, his friends and followers, Charles de Blois, Philippe de Valois, Clément XI, Jean V. the bishop of Saint Brieuc. Donatun and Rogatun de Nantes, the kings Judicaël and Salomon and Saint Gildas de Ruiz, the first to write the history of the Breton people. The sculpture was shown at the 1888 salon de la société des Artistes Français before being placed in the cathedral.

=== Miscellaneous ===
According to the Abbé Pocquet du Haut Jussé's study " Le Mobilier Religieux au 19ème siècle en Ille-et-Vilaine" there are also works by Valentin in Saint Brieuc, Sainte Anne d'Auray, Pontmain, Saint Meen le Grand, Guingand, Lannion, Sillé le Guillaume and Redon.

He died whilst working on the statue of Monseigneur Godinard the archbishop of Rennes. This work was finished by his sons including Paul Valentin who was born in Rennes on 26 August 1871.
