= Ercé-près-Liffré =

Ercé-près-Liffré Erczaé (Gallo) Herzieg-Liverieg (Breton)
- Commune
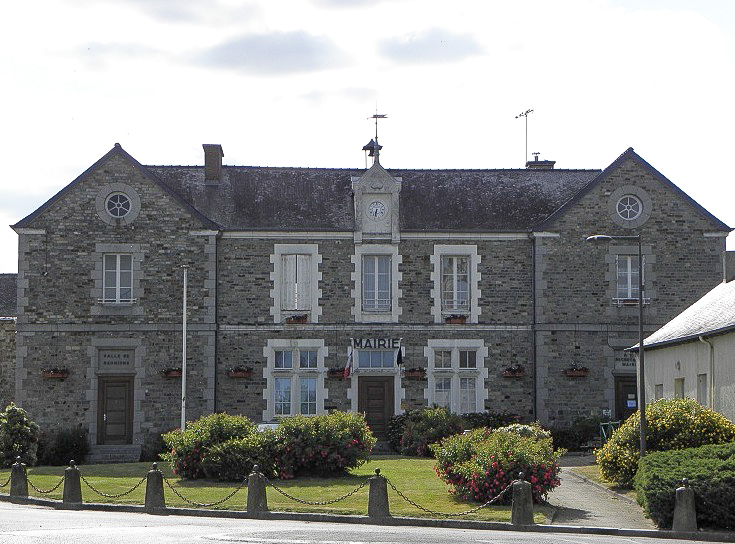
- Town hall
- Location of Ercé-près-Liffré
- Location within France Location within Brittany
- Coordinates: 48°15′22″N 1°30′59″W
- Country: France
- Region: Brittany
- Department: Ille-et-Vilaine
- Arrondissement: Rennes
- Canton: Liffré
- Intercommunality: Liffré-Cormier Communauté

Government
  - Mayor (2020–2026): Bertrand Chevestrier
- Area^{1}: 15.78 km^{2} (6.09 sq mi)
- Highest elevation: 112 m (367 ft)
- Lowest elevation: 46 m (151 ft)
- Population (2023): 2,034
  - Density: 128.9/km^{2} (333.8/sq mi)
- Time zone: UTC+01:00 (CET)
  - Summer (DST): UTC+02:00 (CEST)
- INSEE/Postal code: 35107 /35340
- ^{1} French Land Register data, which excludes lakes, ponds, glaciers > 1 km^{2} (0.386 sq mi or 247 acres) and river estuaries.

Ercé-près-Liffré (French pronunciation: [ɛʁse pʁɛ lifʁe], literally Ercé near Liffré; Breton: Herzieg-Liverieg) is a commune in the Ille-et-Vilaine department in Brittany in northwestern France. It is about 20 km northeast of Rennes.

== Population ==
Inhabitants of Ercé-près-Liffré are called Ercéens in French.

Historical population
Year	Pop.	±% p.a.
1968	813	—
1975	763	−0.90%
1982	1,024	+4.29%
1990	1,122	+1.15%
1999	1,364	+2.19%
2007	1,796	+3.50%
2012	1,759	−0.42%
2017	1,808	+0.55%
2023	2,034	+1.98%
Source: INSEE

== See also ==
- Communes of the Ille-et-Vilaine department
- Jean-Marie Valentin
