= Granville Graving Dock =

- Forme de radoub du port de Granville
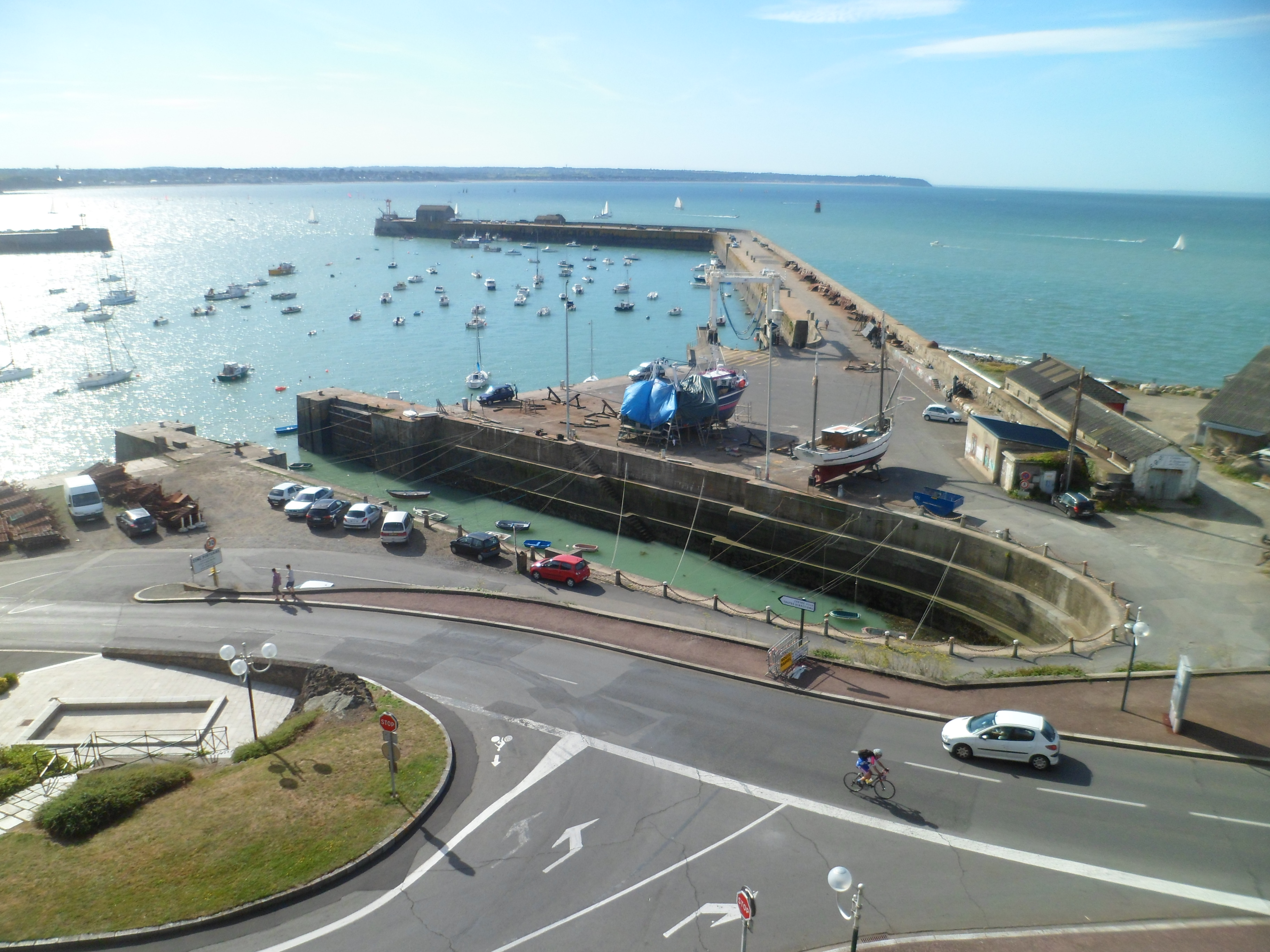
- The dock in 2012
- Interactive map of the Granville Graving Dock area

General information
- Type: Graving Dock
- Location: Granville, Manche, quai du Pan-Coupé, France
- Coordinates: 48.833766°N 1.608294°W
- Construction started: 1882
- Completed: 1888
- Closed: 1975

Granville Graving Dock, in French: Forme de radoub du port de Granville, is a historic dry dock in Granville, France. The dry dock has the rare feature that the local high tidal range meant that it did not require a pumping system.

In 1975, the dock ceased to operate. In 2008, it became a listed building.

== Construction ==
Starting in the second half of the 18th century, many improvements were made to the port of Granville. The mid-19th century would become the heyday of the harbor of Granville. In 1876, the Granville chamber of commerce under president Riotteau demanded the construction of a dry dock. A decree of 22 March 1880 stated that this was in the public interest.

The main purpose of the dry dock was to maintain the vessels of the fr:Terre-neuviers. These fished for Cod on the Grand Banks of Newfoundland.

The project to build Granville Graving Dock was approved in 1880. It called for a dry dock able to service and repair vessels of up 68 m, meaning 1,500 – 2,000t. Work started in 1882, but was interrupted in February 1883. Work was finished in 1888, but final delivery was only on 31 December 1888.

== Characteristics ==
The side walls of Granville Graving Dock are indented by staircases and end in a demi-circle on the land end. The walls are made of granite blocks that are connected with dovetail joints. The side walls have three rows of shoring steps.

Granville Graving Dock is one of a few sizable dry docks that do not have pumps. Due to the tidal range of over 10 m at Granville, the dock can automatically empty itself at ebb by means of a drain pipe.

At the coping level, the dock is 75 m long and 20 m wide. For mariners, the floor length was given as 65 m from the foot of the land end to the rudder pit and 68 m including the rudder pit.

The top of the dock is 1.60 m above spring tide. The total height on the inside is 9.10 m, but this only 8.70 m at the gate. Again, the relevant measures were those given to mariners. The entrance was 14.30 m wide. The level of water above the sill was 7.00 m at spring tide and 3.50 m at neap tide.

== Service ==
Granville Graving Dock was the only drydock between Brest and Cherbourg up about 1910, when the smaller La Landriais Graving Dock was built. From its opening until the end of World War II, it saw heavy use. It was used to maintain the fr:Terre-neuviers between their campaigns, but also for coastal vessels, port service vessels, buiys tenders, etc. Vessels came from places like: Granville, Cancale, Saint Malo and Jersey. The dry dock ceased to operate in 1975.

An order of 28 March 2008 listed the dry dock and its iron gates as a monument historique. In 2009, the Association pour la promotion des ports de Granville (APPG) wanted to put in back in use. Cost was estimated at € 900,000.
