= La Landriais Graving Dock =

- Cale sèche de la Landriais
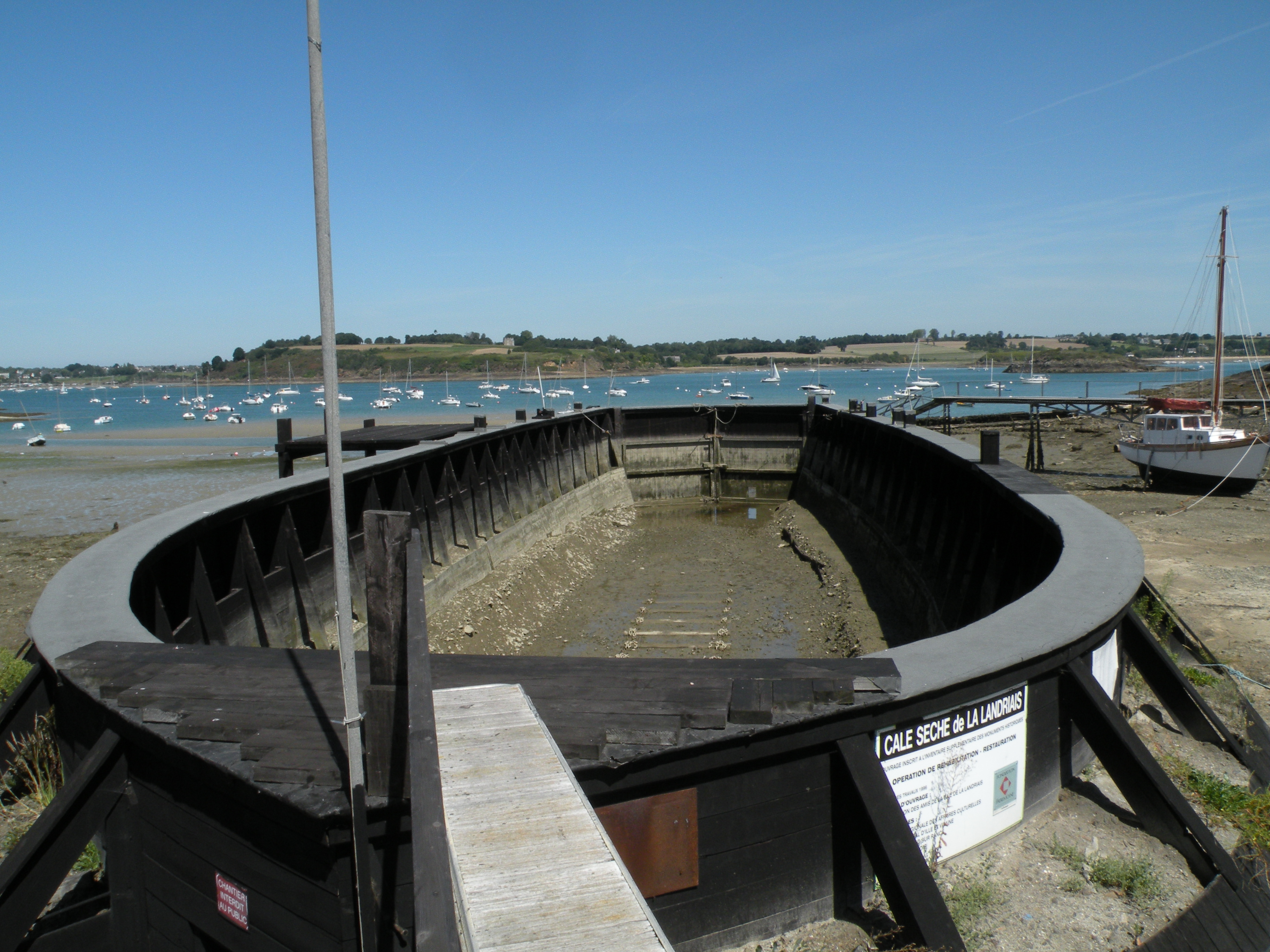
- The dock in 2011
- Interactive map of the La Landriais Graving Dock area

General information
- Type: Graving Dock
- Location: Le Minihic-sur-Rance, La Landriais, France
- Coordinates: 48.582821°N 2.000924°W
- Construction started: 1908
- Completed: 1910

La Landriais Graving Dock (French: Cale sèche de la Landriais) is a historic dry dock in Le Minihic-sur-Rance, France. The drydock is part of an active repair shipyard. In 1996, it became a listed building.

La Landriais Graving Dock is of a very rare, and probably unique construction. It is a wooden box in the form of a ship. It also has the rare feature that the local high tidal range makes that it does not require a pumphouse.

== History ==
The bay of La Landriais at Le Minihic-sur-Rance is located just south of Saint-Malo. It has some properties that made it suitable for shipbuilding and repair. From the late 17th century, sloops and fishing barques were built in the area. By the mid-19th century, La Landriais had eight shipyards, which built all kinds of small vessels. Their primary activity was ship repair. The bay with its beaches and high tidal range was very suitable for careening. The bay was also less than 10 km from Saint-Malo, which was home to many vessels.

Lemarchand Shipyard in La Landriais was founded in 1850. In 1887, it was inherited by the founder's daughter and her husband Captain François Lemarchand (1849-1937). In 1896, he retired as captain and began to expand the shipyard. It was modernized, but continued to build wooden vessels.

François was succeeded by his son Louis, who led the shipyard till 1959. It was then acquired by Mr. and Mrs. Brossellin and built small recreational vessels until 1982. Under Mr. Fabry it ceased all activity due to the introduction of fiberglass hulls. In 2002, the shipyard was acquired by Mr. Campion, manager of the neighboring Tanet yard.

In 1905, François Lemarchand got the idea to build La Landriais Graving Dock. Its primary goal was to service the fr:Terre-neuviers. These fished on cod at the Grand Banks of Newfoundland. Most where operated by companies based in Brittany and Normandy. Granville Graving Dock in nearby Granville had been built for the same purpose two decades earlier.

In two or three years, the dry dock was built. It was built by the proper means of the shipyard and during times that there was less work.

== Characteristics ==
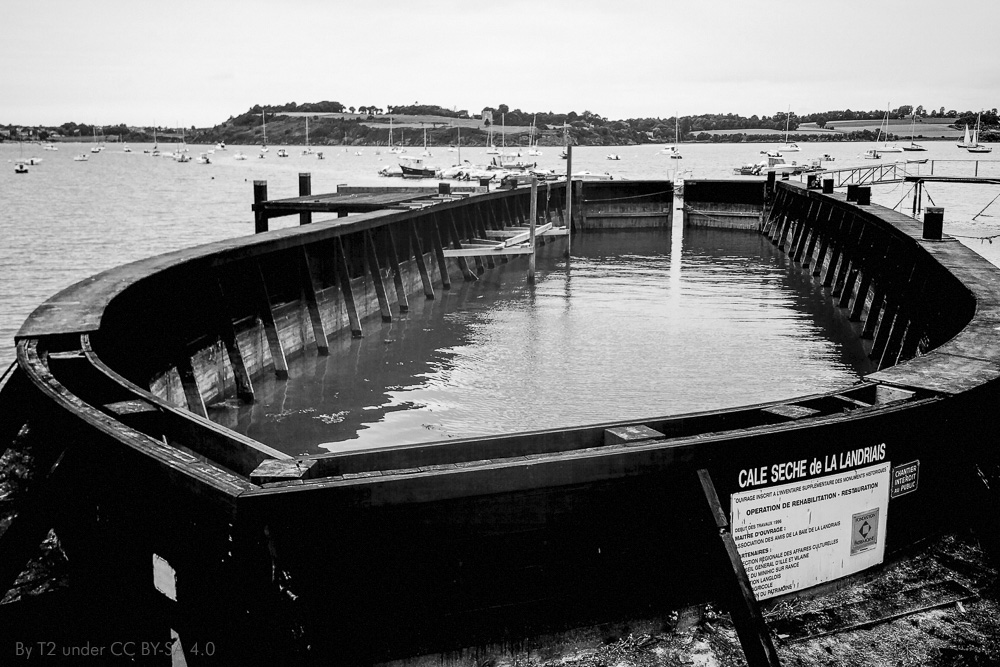
In 2016

La Landriais Graving Dock has the form of a ship's hull. It was built on a lightly inclined beach. The dock's gates are at the low tide line. The dock then digs a bit into the beach. It is closed by mitre gates that point towards the sea. A horse assisted in closing the gates, which weigh 3t each.

45 oak Piles of 7 m by 30*30 cm were driven into the ground, protected by a 2 m long jacket. These were interconnected by fir beams of 22.5 by 7.5 cm. Next a vertical line of planks of 7.5 cm thickness was attached to the beams. This was covered in tar paper. A final horizontal line of planks of 3 cm thickness was also tarred.

On top of the walls, there is a walkway. This can be used to move around, but it also gives access to a series of props on the outside and inside. These allow to fill the spaces between the wooden walls. This increases the strength and watertightness of the entire structure.

La Landriais Graving Dock is one of a few sizable dry docks that do not have pumps. Due to the tidal range at La Landriais, the dock can automatically empty itself at ebb by means of a drain pipe.

Landriais Graving Dock is 45 m long with a width of 10 m and is 5 m high. The effective dimensions of the dry dock are that vessels with a length of 40 m and a draft of 4 m can use it.

== Service ==
La Landriais Graving Dock was the second drydock between Brest and Cherbourg. From 1907 to 1937 it helped to maintain, copper and repair fr:Terre-neuviers, three mast schooners and brigs. Due to the slow decline in ocean fishing, the creation of a dry dock in Saint-Malo, and the creation of the dam, the dry dock fell in disrepair. It closed in 1938.

In 1996, the Association des Amis de la baie de la Landriais began to act to preserve the dry dock. Plans by Professor Jean Le Bot were instrumental in these efforts. In 1997, the Amis opted for a total reconstruction of the dry dock. In 2006 a new pair of gates was placed. On 30 August 2008, the dry dock was reopened for use. Total cost amounted to € 410,000.

An order of 8 August 1996 listed the dry dock and its iron gates as a monument historique. The unique construction of the dock helped to obtain this protection.
