= Thorigné-Fouillard =

Thorigné-Fouillard Toreinyaé-Fólhard (Gallo) Torigneg-Fouilharzh (Breton)
- Commune
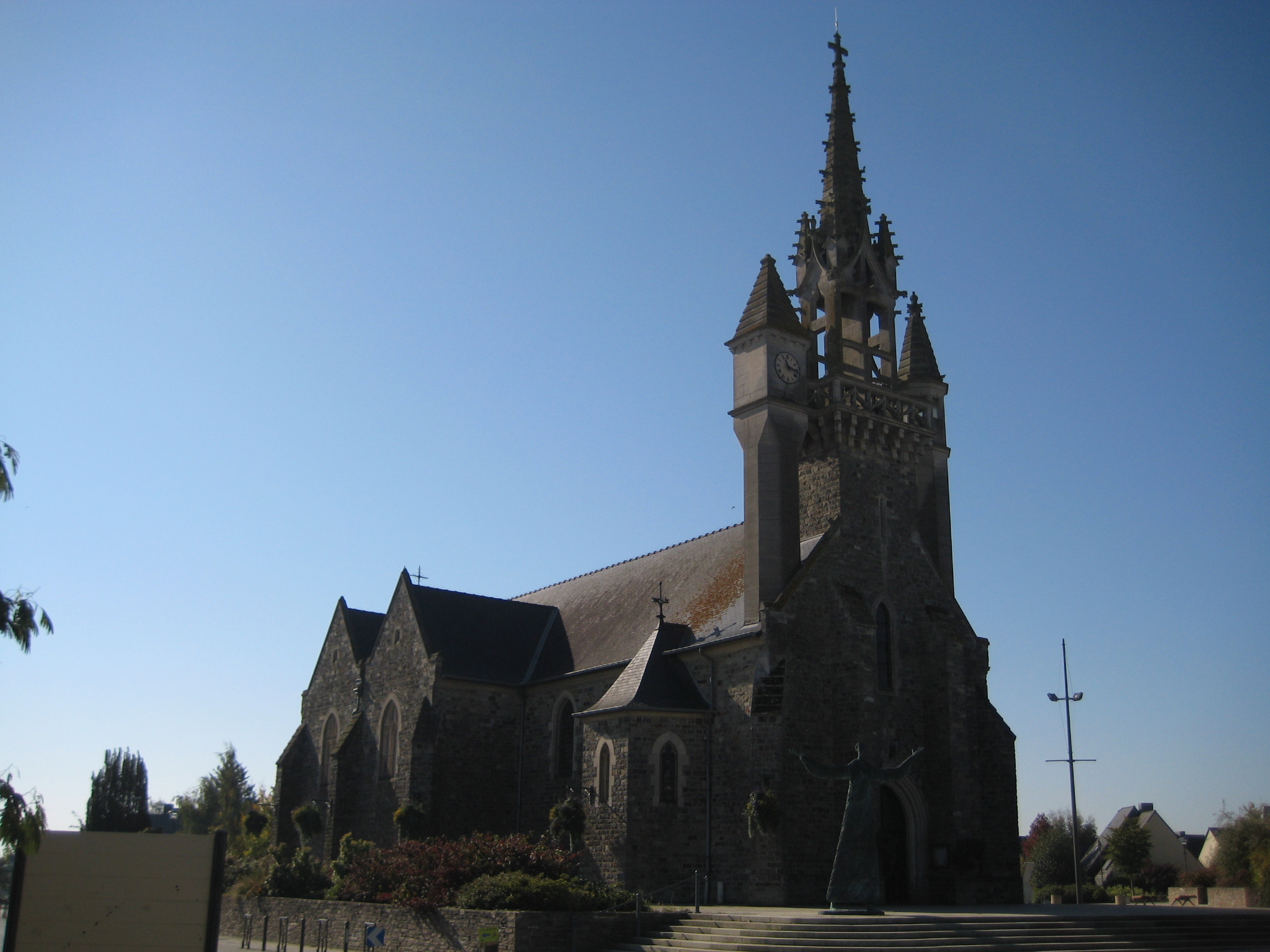
- The church in Thorigné-Fouillard
- Location of Thorigné-Fouillard
- Location within France Location within Brittany
- Coordinates: 48°09′37″N 1°34′43″W
- Country: France
- Region: Brittany
- Department: Ille-et-Vilaine
- Arrondissement: Rennes
- Canton: Liffré
- Intercommunality: Rennes Métropole

Government
  - Mayor (2020–2026): Gaël Lefeuvre
- Area^{1}: 13.58 km^{2} (5.24 sq mi)
- Highest elevation: 89 m (292 ft)
- Lowest elevation: 27 m (89 ft)
- Population (2023): 8,667
  - Density: 638.2/km^{2} (1,653/sq mi)
- Time zone: UTC+01:00 (CET)
  - Summer (DST): UTC+02:00 (CEST)
- INSEE/Postal code: 35334 /35235
- ^{1} French Land Register data, which excludes lakes, ponds, glaciers > 1 km^{2} (0.386 sq mi or 247 acres) and river estuaries.

Thorigné-Fouillard (French pronunciation: [tɔʁiɲe fujaʁ]; Breton: Torigneg-Fouilharzh; Gallo: Toreinyaé-Fólhard, before 1984: Thorigné-sur-Vilaine) is a commune in the Ille-et-Vilaine department in Brittany in northwestern France.

== Population ==
Inhabitants of Thorigné-Fouillard are called Thoréfoléens in French.

Historical population
Year	Pop.	±% p.a.
1968	892	—
1975	2,048	+12.61%
1982	3,591	+8.35%
1990	5,257	+4.88%
1999	6,625	+2.60%
2007	6,932	+0.57%
2012	7,526	+1.66%
2017	8,463	+2.37%
2023	8,667	+0.40%
Source: INSEE

== See also ==
- Communes of the Ille-et-Vilaine department
