= Dourdain =

Dourdain Dórdaen (Gallo) Dourdan (Breton)
- Commune
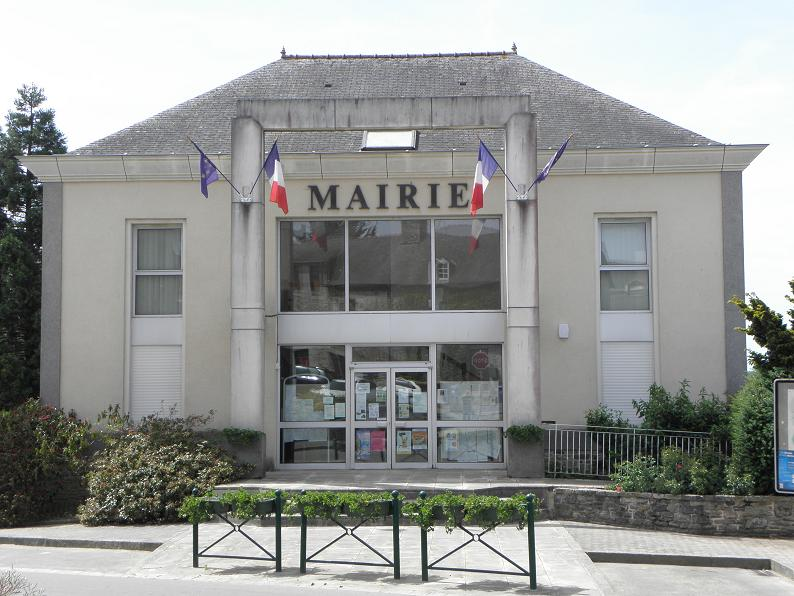
- Town hall
- Location of Dourdain
- Location within France Location within Brittany
- Coordinates: 48°11′38″N 1°22′06″W
- Country: France
- Region: Brittany
- Department: Ille-et-Vilaine
- Arrondissement: Rennes
- Canton: Liffré
- Intercommunality: Liffré-Cormier Communauté

Government
  - Mayor (2023–2026): Michel Maillard
- Area^{1}: 13.80 km^{2} (5.33 sq mi)
- Highest elevation: 112 m (367 ft)
- Lowest elevation: 52 m (171 ft)
- Population (2023): 1,237
  - Density: 89.64/km^{2} (232.2/sq mi)
- Time zone: UTC+01:00 (CET)
  - Summer (DST): UTC+02:00 (CEST)
- INSEE/Postal code: 35101 /35450
- ^{1} French Land Register data, which excludes lakes, ponds, glaciers > 1 km^{2} (0.386 sq mi or 247 acres) and river estuaries.

Dourdain (French pronunciation: [duʁdɛ̃]; Breton: Dourdan; Gallo: Dórdaen) is a commune in the Ille-et-Vilaine department in Brittany in northwestern France.

== Population ==
Inhabitants of Dourdain are called Dourdanais in French.

Historical population
Year	Pop.	±% p.a.
1968	680	—
1975	588	−2.06%
1982	560	−0.69%
1990	594	+0.74%
1999	706	+1.94%
2007	987	+4.28%
2012	1,087	+1.95%
2017	1,159	+1.29%
2023	1,237	+1.09%
Source: INSEE

== See also ==
- Communes of the Ille-et-Vilaine department
