= Chasné-sur-Illet =

Chasné-sur-Illet Chasnaé (Gallo) Kadeneg (Breton)
- Commune
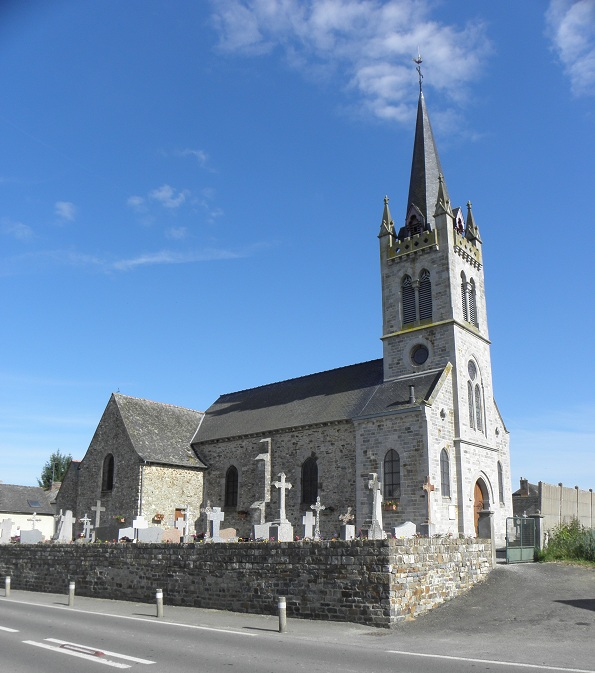
- Saint Martin church

- Coat of arms
- Location of Chasné-sur-Illet
- Location within France Location within Brittany
- Coordinates: 48°14′32″N 1°33′37″W
- Country: France
- Region: Brittany
- Department: Ille-et-Vilaine
- Arrondissement: Rennes
- Canton: Liffré
- Intercommunality: Liffré-Cormier Communauté

Government
  - Mayor (2025–2026): Benoît Michot
- Area^{1}: 9.47 km^{2} (3.66 sq mi)
- Highest elevation: 81 m (266 ft)
- Lowest elevation: 39 m (128 ft)
- Population (2023): 1,744
  - Density: 184/km^{2} (477/sq mi)
- Time zone: UTC+01:00 (CET)
  - Summer (DST): UTC+02:00 (CEST)
- INSEE/Postal code: 35067 /35250
- ^{1} French Land Register data, which excludes lakes, ponds, glaciers > 1 km^{2} (0.386 sq mi or 247 acres) and river estuaries.

Chasné-sur-Illet (French pronunciation: [ʃane syʁ ilɛ]; Gallo: Chasnaé, Breton: Kadeneg) is a commune in the Ille-et-Vilaine department in Brittany in northwestern France.

== Population ==
Inhabitants of Chasné-sur-Illet are called Chasnéens in French.

Historical population
Year	Pop.	±% p.a.
1968	415	—
1975	540	+3.83%
1982	866	+6.98%
1990	882	+0.23%
1999	1,139	+2.88%
2007	1,394	+2.56%
2012	1,476	+1.15%
2017	1,537	+0.81%
2023	1,744	+2.13%
Source: INSEE

== See also ==
- Communes of the Ille-et-Vilaine department
