= Canton of Liffré =

Coordinates: 48.21°N 1.51°W

- Canton
- Country: France
- Region: Brittany
- Department: Ille-et-Vilaine
- No. of communes: {{{nbcomm}}}
- Established: 15 February 1790
- Population (2023): 38,374
- INSEE code: 35 13

The canton of Liffré is an administrative division of the Ille-et-Vilaine department, in northwestern France. At the French canton reorganisation which came into effect in March 2015, it was expanded from 8 to 9 communes. Its seat is in Liffré.

== Composition ==
=== Composition since 2015 ===
Since the 2015 departmental elections, the canton of Liffré has re-grouped nine communes in their entirety:

List of communes of the canton of Liffré since 2015
Commune	INSEE code	Intercommunality	Area (km^{2})	Population (2020)	Density (per km^{2})
Liffré (seat)	35152	Liffré-Cormier Communauté	66.86	8,129	122
Acigné	35001	Rennes Métropole	29.55	6,865	232
La Bouëxière	35031	Liffré-Cormier Communauté	49.68	4,546	92
Brécé	35039	Rennes Métropole	7.16	2,040	285
Chasné-sur-Illet	35067	Liffré-Cormier Communauté	9.47	1,628	172
Dourdain	35101	Liffré-Cormier Communauté	13.80	1,212	88
Ercé-près-Liffré	35107	Liffré-Cormier Communauté	15.78	1,965	125
Saint-Sulpice-la-Forêt	35315	Rennes Métropole	6.72	1,440	214
Thorigné-Fouillard	35334	Rennes Métropole	13.58	8,548	632
Canton of Liffré	35 13	—	212.60	36,409	171

== See also ==
- Cantons of the Ille-et-Vilaine department
