= Brécé =

Brécé Berczaé (Gallo) Brec'heg (Breton)
- Commune
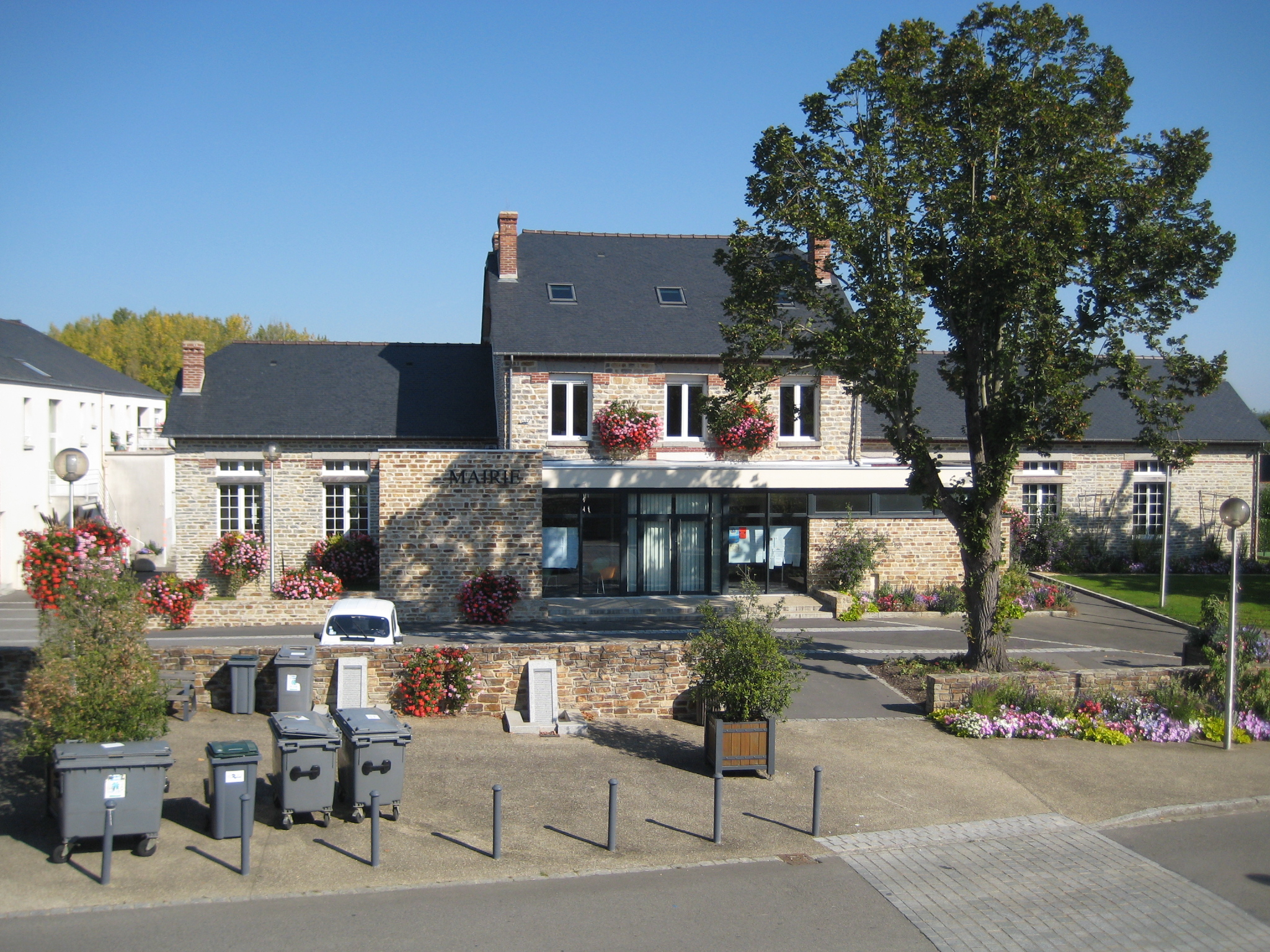
- Town hall
- Location of Brécé
- Location within France Location within Brittany
- Coordinates: 48°06′34″N 1°28′51″W
- Country: France
- Region: Brittany
- Department: Ille-et-Vilaine
- Arrondissement: Rennes
- Canton: Liffré
- Intercommunality: Rennes Métropole

Government
  - Mayor (2020–2026): Christophe Chevance
- Area^{1}: 7.16 km^{2} (2.76 sq mi)
- Highest elevation: 73 m (240 ft)
- Lowest elevation: 32 m (105 ft)
- Population (2023): 2,232
  - Density: 312/km^{2} (807/sq mi)
- Time zone: UTC+01:00 (CET)
  - Summer (DST): UTC+02:00 (CEST)
- INSEE/Postal code: 35039 /35530
- ^{1} French Land Register data, which excludes lakes, ponds, glaciers > 1 km^{2} (0.386 sq mi or 247 acres) and river estuaries.

Brécé (French pronunciation: [bʁese]; Breton: Brec'heg; Gallo: Berczaé) is a commune in the Ille-et-Vilaine department in Brittany in northwestern France.

== Population ==
Inhabitants of Brécé are called Brécéens in French.

Historical population
Year	Pop.	±% p.a.
1968	454	—
1975	630	+4.79%
1982	835	+4.11%
1990	1,128	+3.83%
1999	1,561	+3.68%
2007	1,760	+1.51%
2012	2,005	+2.64%
2017	2,106	+0.99%
2023	2,232	+0.97%
Source: INSEE

== See also ==
- Communes of the Ille-et-Vilaine department
