= Saint-Sulpice-la-Forêt =

Saint-Sulpice-la-Forêt Sant-Suleg-ar-C'hoad
- Commune
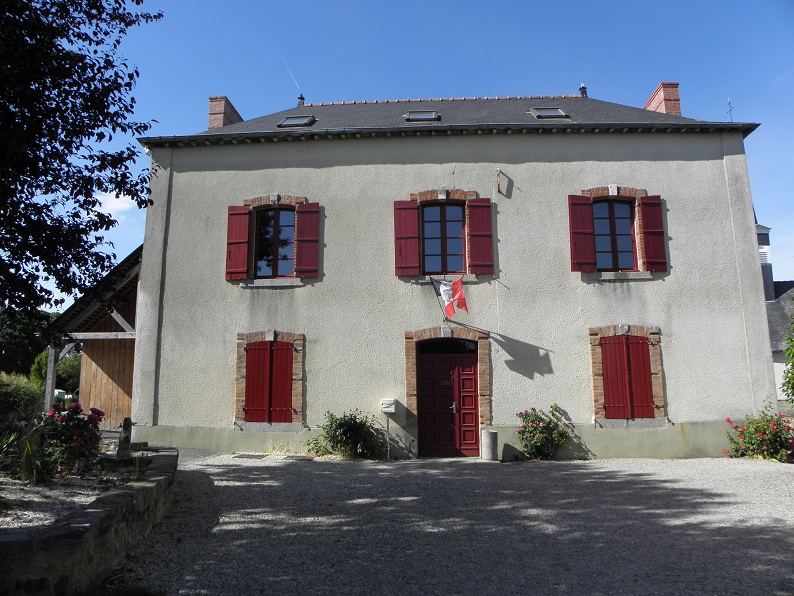
- The town hall of Saint-Sulpice-la-Forêt

- Coat of arms
- Location of Saint-Sulpice-la-Forêt
- Location within France Location within Brittany
- Coordinates: 48°13′08″N 1°34′41″W
- Country: France
- Region: Brittany
- Department: Ille-et-Vilaine
- Arrondissement: Rennes
- Canton: Liffré
- Intercommunality: Rennes Métropole

Government
  - Mayor (2020–2026): Yann Huaumé
- Area^{1}: 6.72 km^{2} (2.59 sq mi)
- Highest elevation: 92 m (302 ft)
- Lowest elevation: 46 m (151 ft)
- Population (2023): 1,580
  - Density: 235/km^{2} (609/sq mi)
- Time zone: UTC+01:00 (CET)
  - Summer (DST): UTC+02:00 (CEST)
- INSEE/Postal code: 35315 /35250
- ^{1} French Land Register data, which excludes lakes, ponds, glaciers > 1 km^{2} (0.386 sq mi or 247 acres) and river estuaries.

Saint-Sulpice-la-Forêt (French pronunciation: [sɛ̃ sylpis la fɔʁɛ]; Breton: Sant-Suleg-ar-C'hoad) is a commune in the Ille-et-Vilaine department in Brittany in northwestern France.

== Population ==
Inhabitants of Saint-Sulpice-la-Forêt are called Sulpiciens in French.

Historical population
Year	Pop.	±% p.a.
1968	325	—
1975	509	+6.62%
1982	731	+5.31%
1990	1,064	+4.80%
1999	1,307	+2.31%
2007	1,416	+1.01%
2012	1,427	+0.15%
2017	1,332	−1.37%
2023	1,580	+2.89%
Source: INSEE

== See also ==
- Communes of the Ille-et-Vilaine department
