= Le Minihic-sur-Rance =

Le Minihic-sur-Rance Le Minic (Gallo) Minic'hi-Poudour (Breton)
- Commune
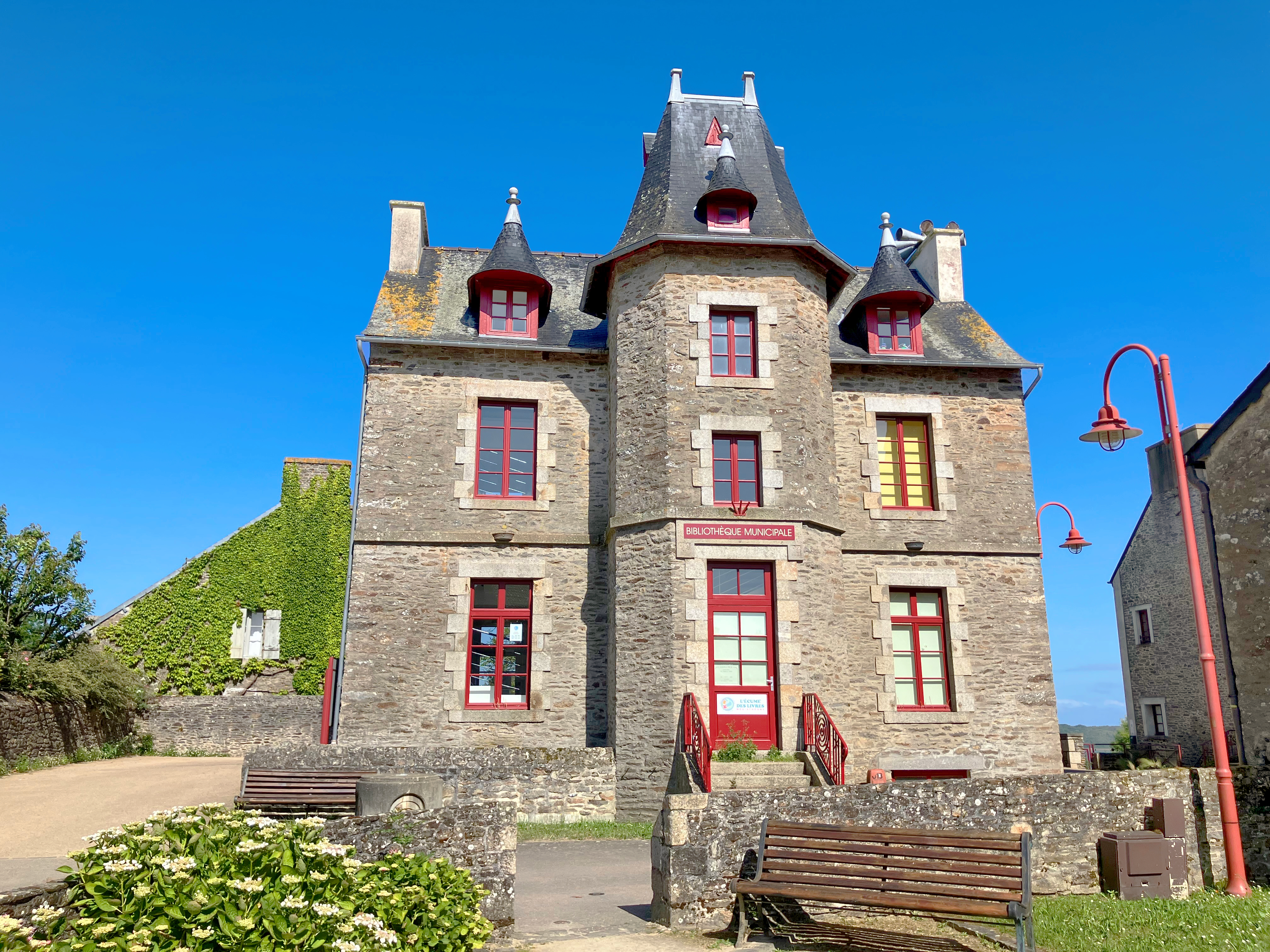
- The municipal library of Le Minihic-sur-Rance
- Location of Le Minihic-sur-Rance
- Location within France Location within Brittany
- Coordinates: 48°34′39″N 2°00′41″W
- Country: France
- Region: Brittany
- Department: Ille-et-Vilaine
- Arrondissement: Saint-Malo
- Canton: Saint-Malo-2
- Intercommunality: Côte d'Emeraude

Government
  - Mayor (2020–2026): Sylvie Sardin
- Area^{1}: 3.91 km^{2} (1.51 sq mi)
- Highest elevation: 61 m (200 ft)
- Lowest elevation: 0 m (0 ft)
- Population (2023): 1,524
  - Density: 390/km^{2} (1,010/sq mi)
- Time zone: UTC+01:00 (CET)
  - Summer (DST): UTC+02:00 (CEST)
- INSEE/Postal code: 35181 /35870
- ^{1} French Land Register data, which excludes lakes, ponds, glaciers > 1 km^{2} (0.386 sq mi or 247 acres) and river estuaries.

Le Minihic-sur-Rance (French pronunciation: [lə mini.ik syʁ ʁɑ̃s], literally Le Minihic on Rance; Gallo: Le Minic, Breton: Minic'hi-Poudour) is a commune in the Ille-et-Vilaine department in Brittany in northwestern France.

== Population ==
Inhabitants of Le Minihic-sur-Rance are called Minihicois in French.

Historical population
Year	Pop.	±% p.a.
1968	721	—
1975	791	+1.33%
1982	978	+3.08%
1990	1,148	+2.02%
1999	1,267	+1.10%
2007	1,327	+0.58%
2012	1,421	+1.38%
2017	1,449	+0.39%
2023	1,524	+0.84%
Source: INSEE

== Culture and heritage ==
The municipality has three listed buildings which have national protection, Monument historiques.

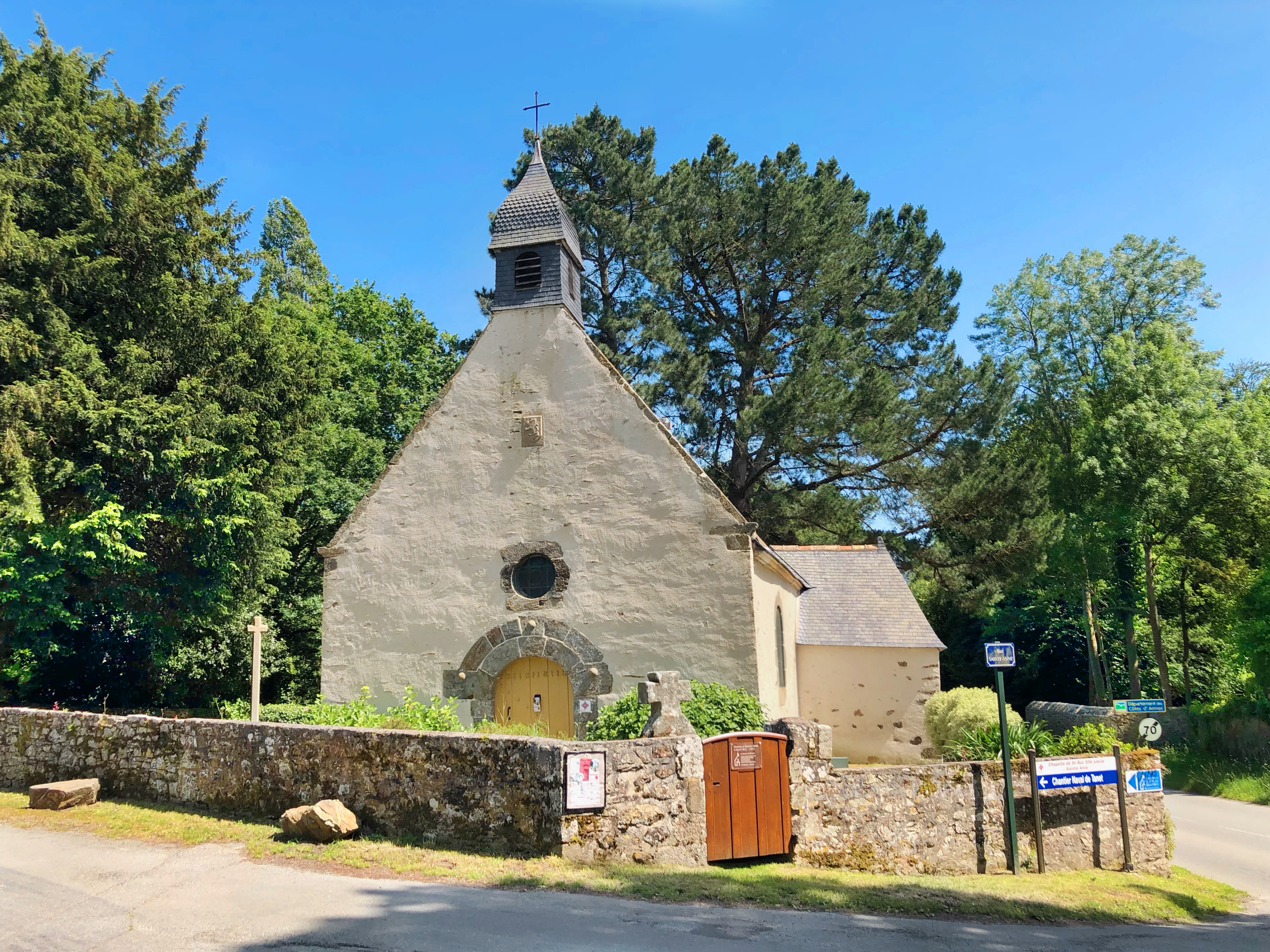
Sainte-Anne's Chappel

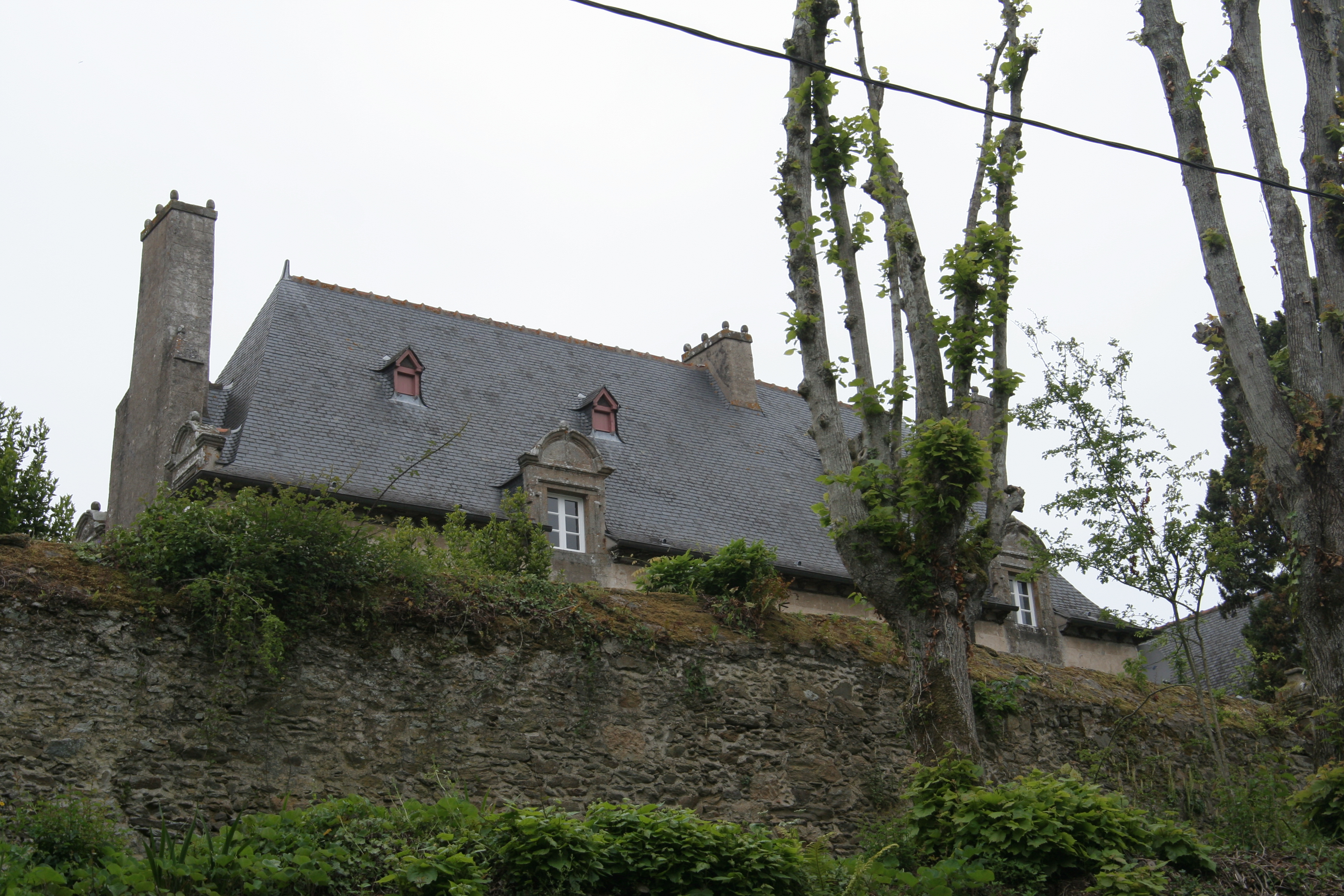
Le Houx Manor.

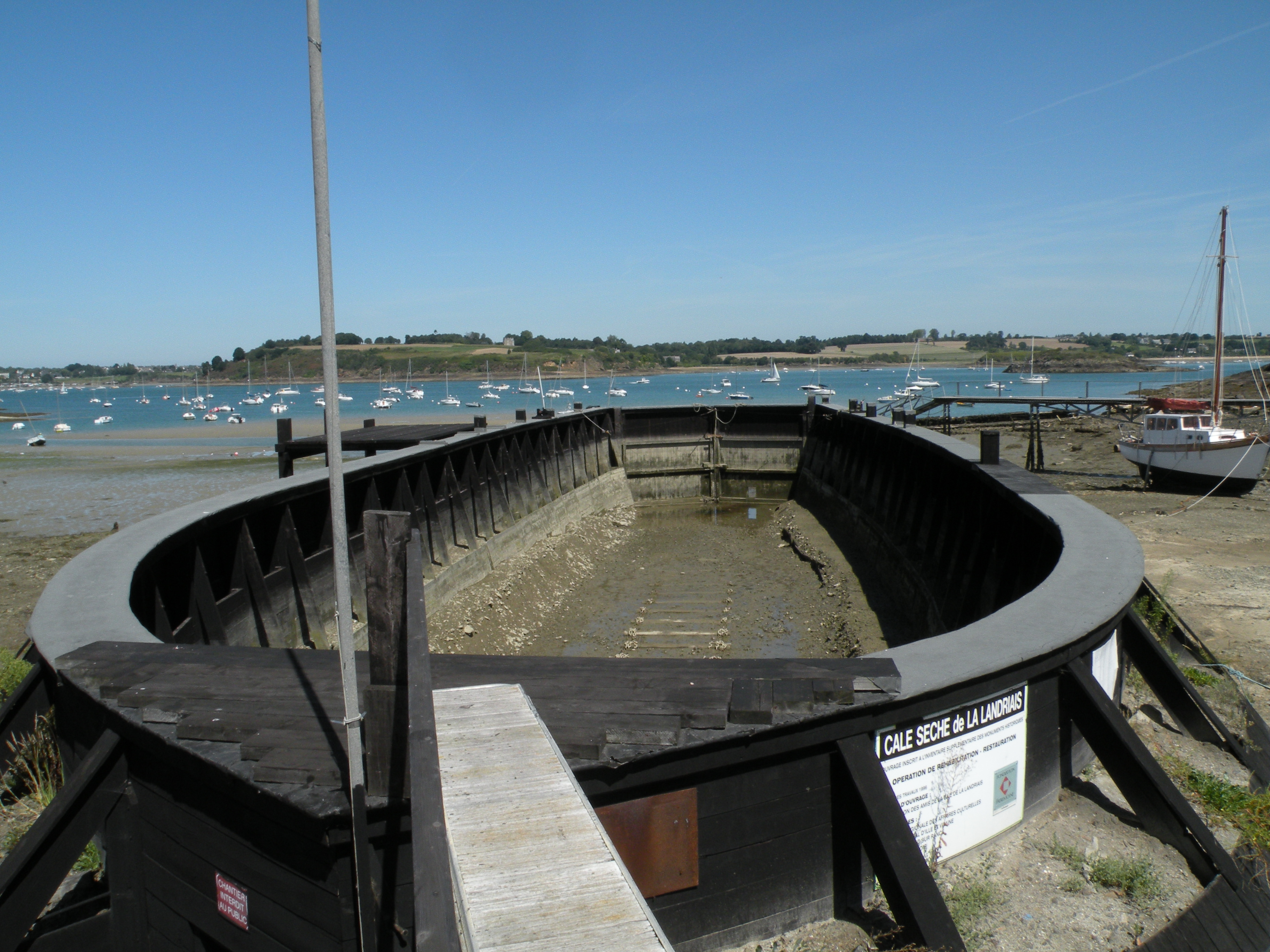
La Landriais Graving Dock

Some other monuments are:

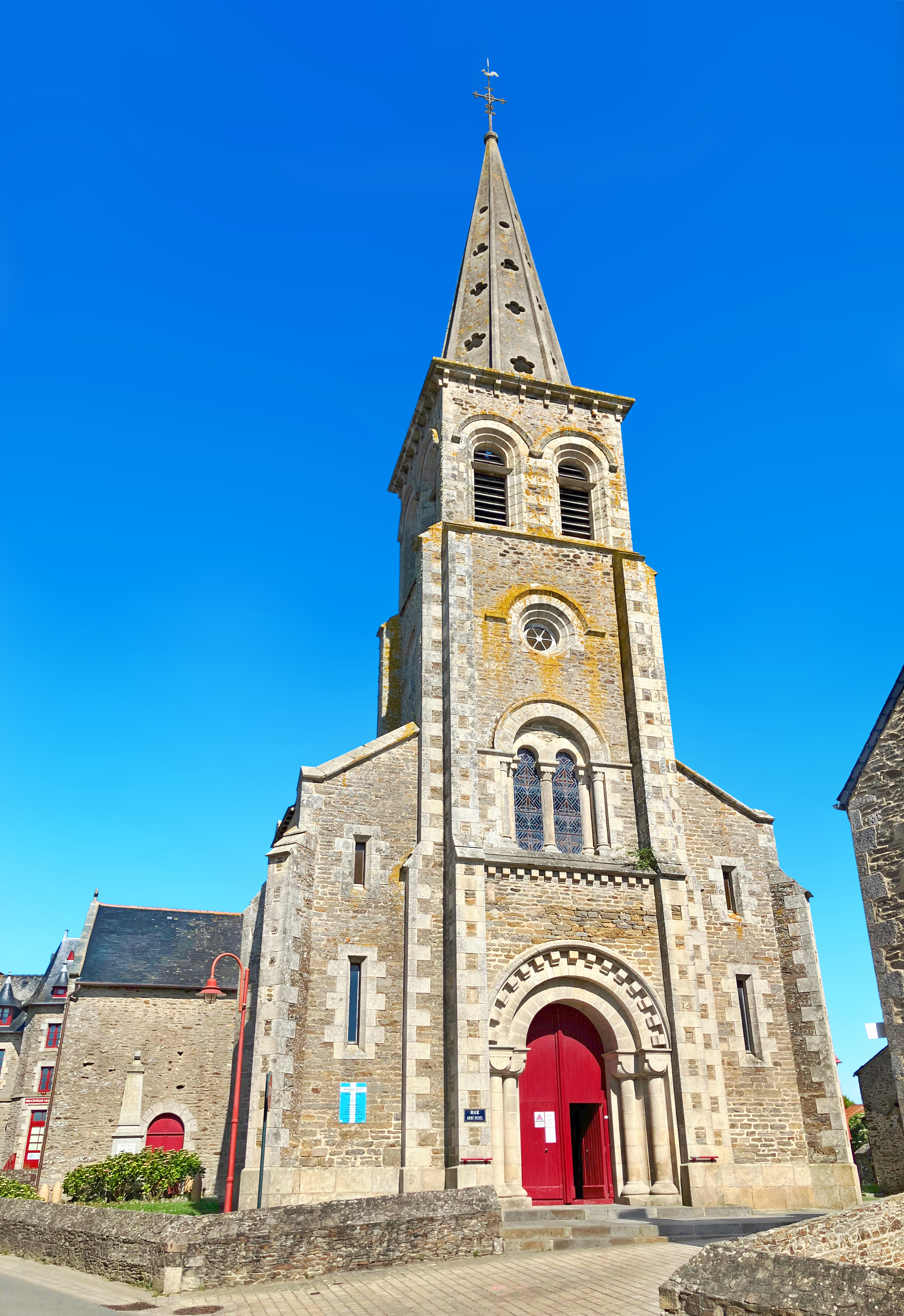
Saint-Malo Church, its façade, ...

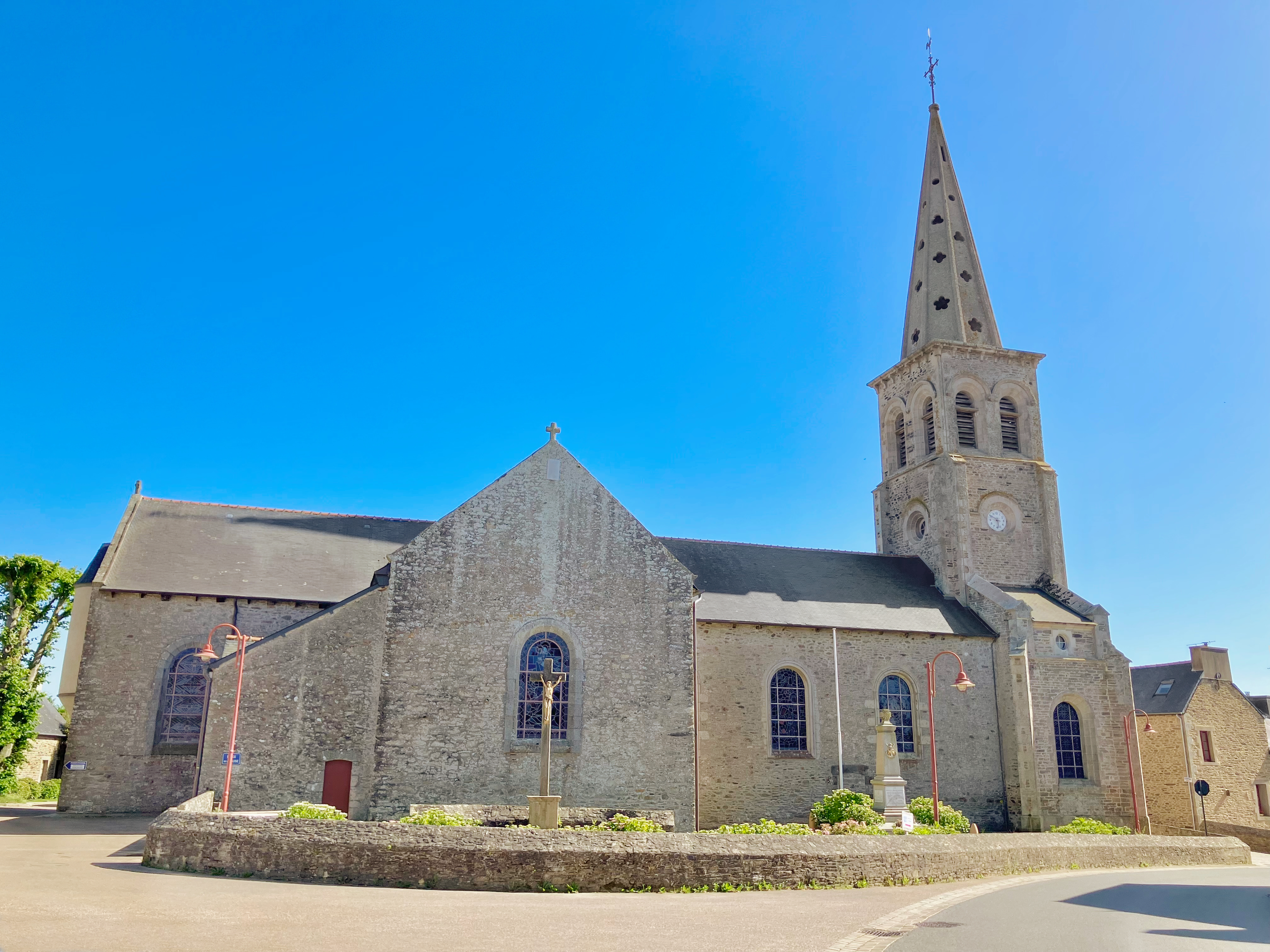
... the Jean-Moulin parish close, the calvary, the war memorial, ...

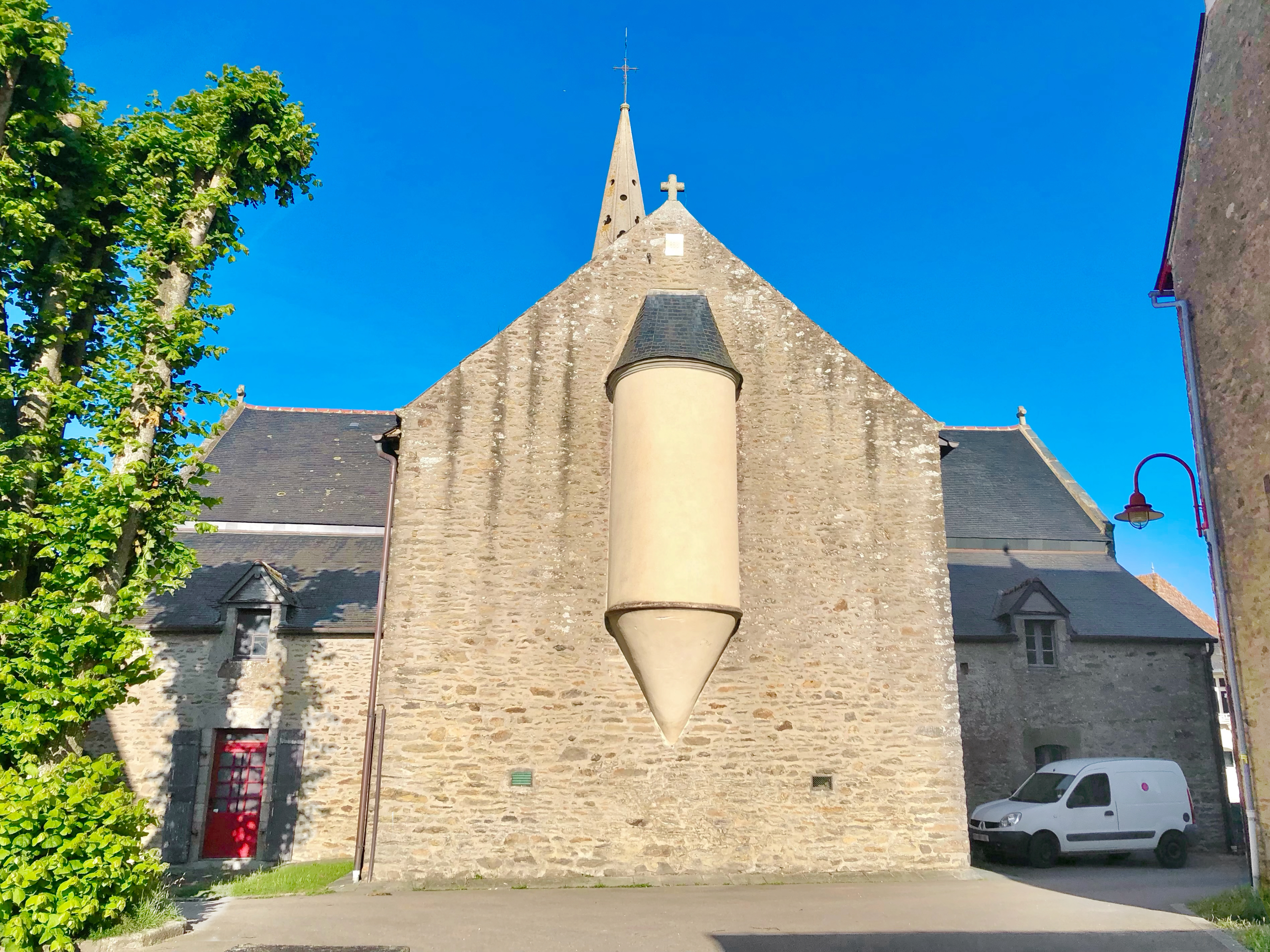
... and the flat east end featuring a niche with an opening to the sky.

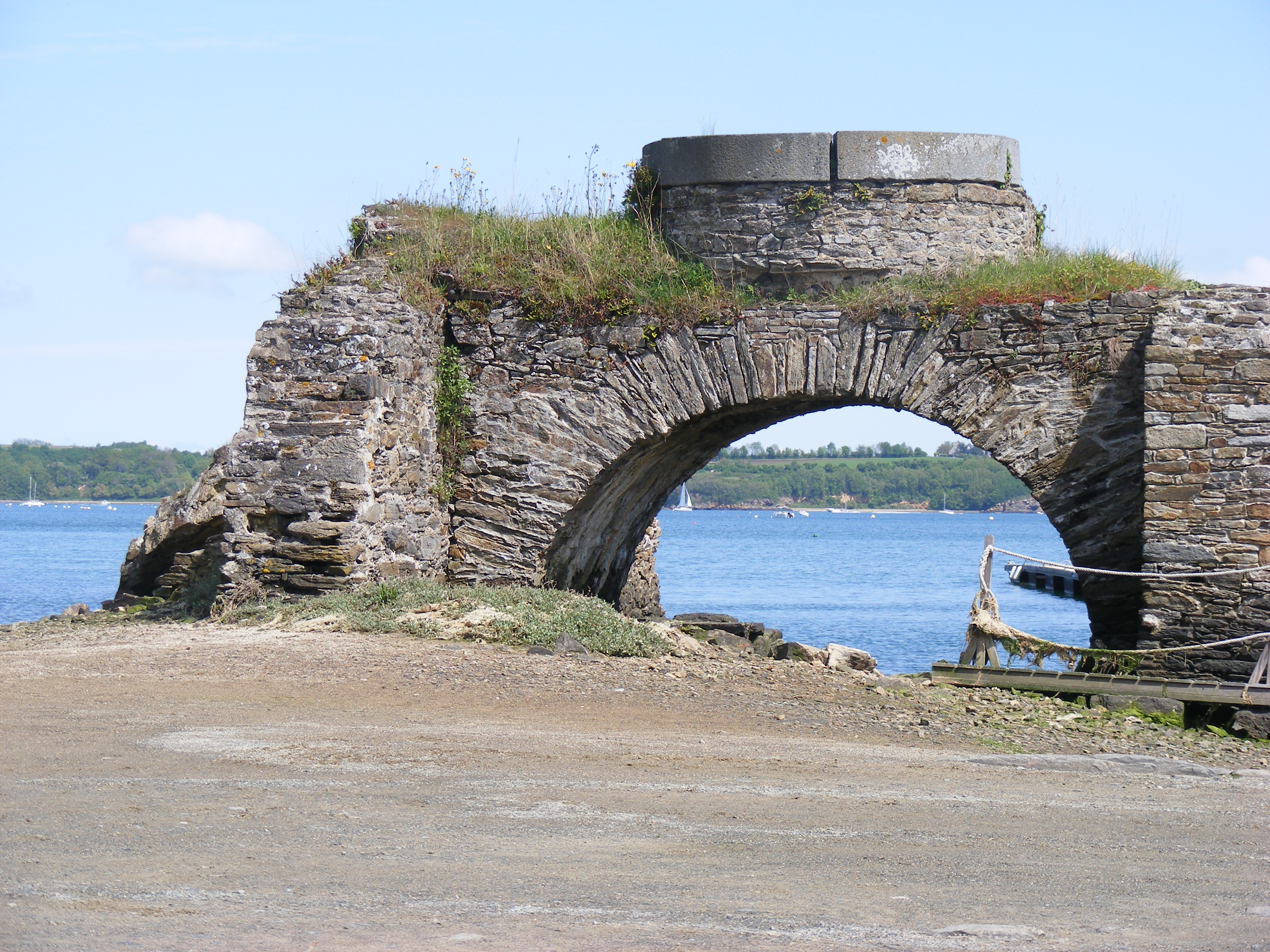
The tidal mill ruins

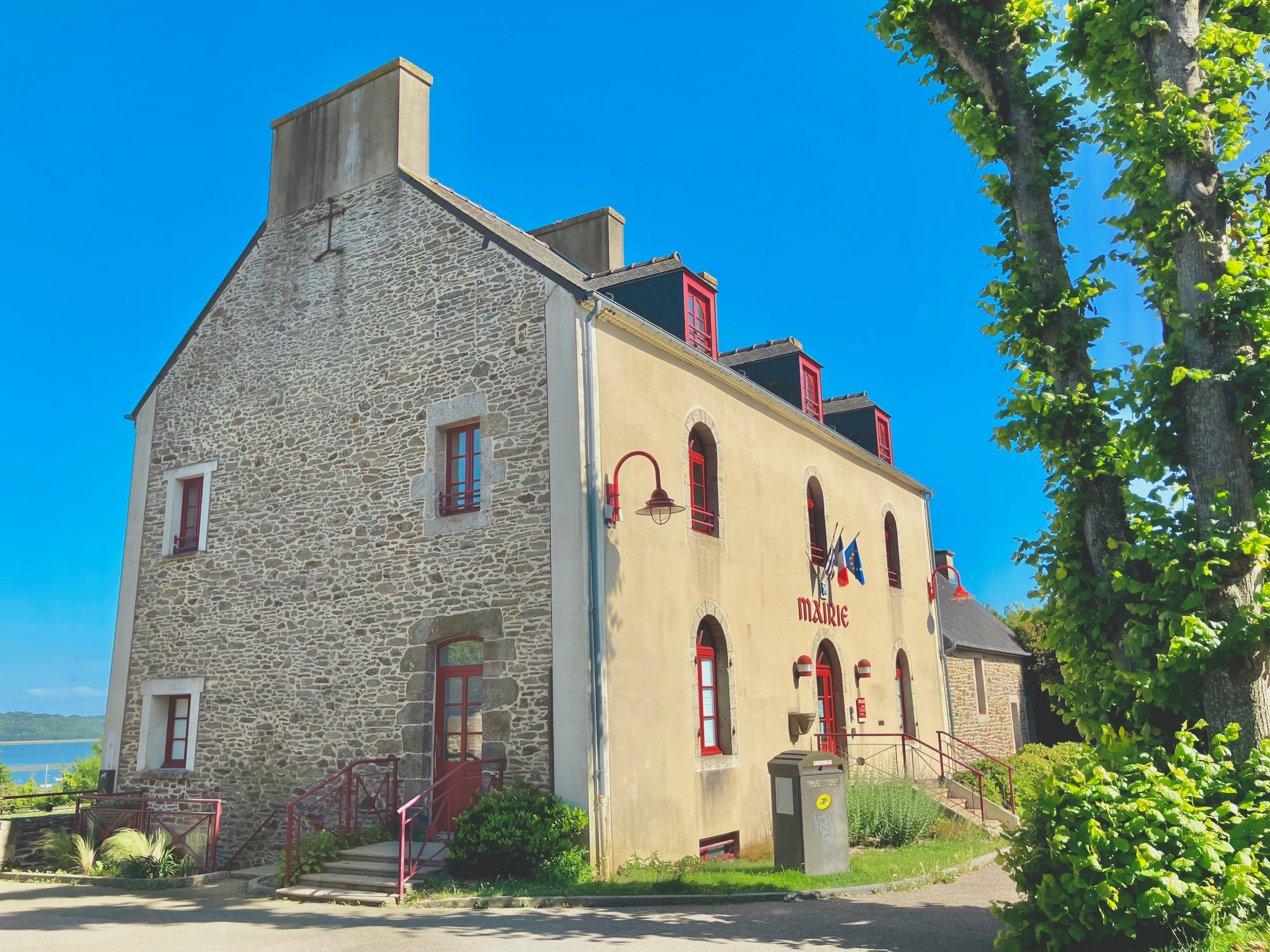
The town hall.

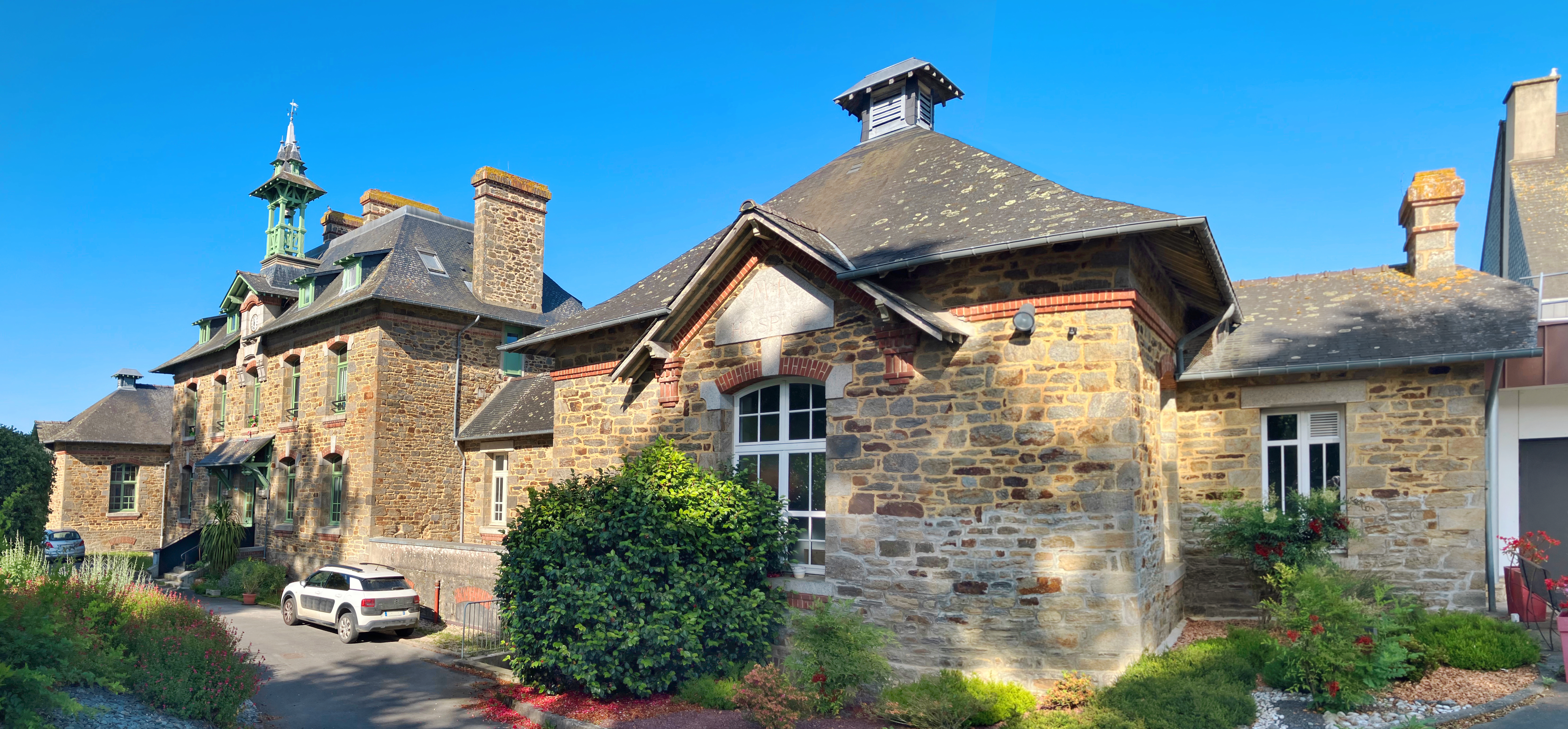
The former Hospital-Hospice.

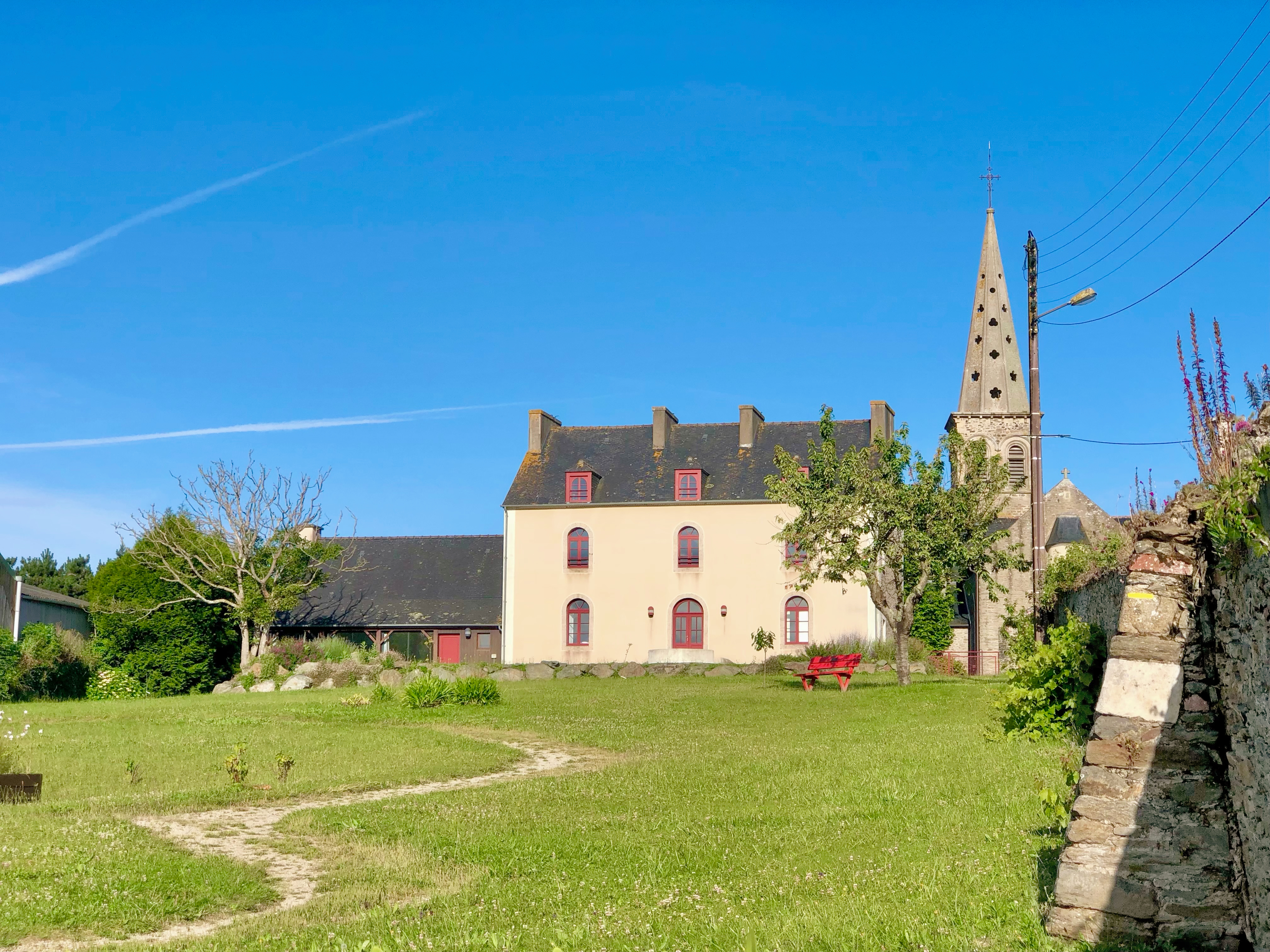
The eastern facade of the town hall and the municipal garden.

== See also ==
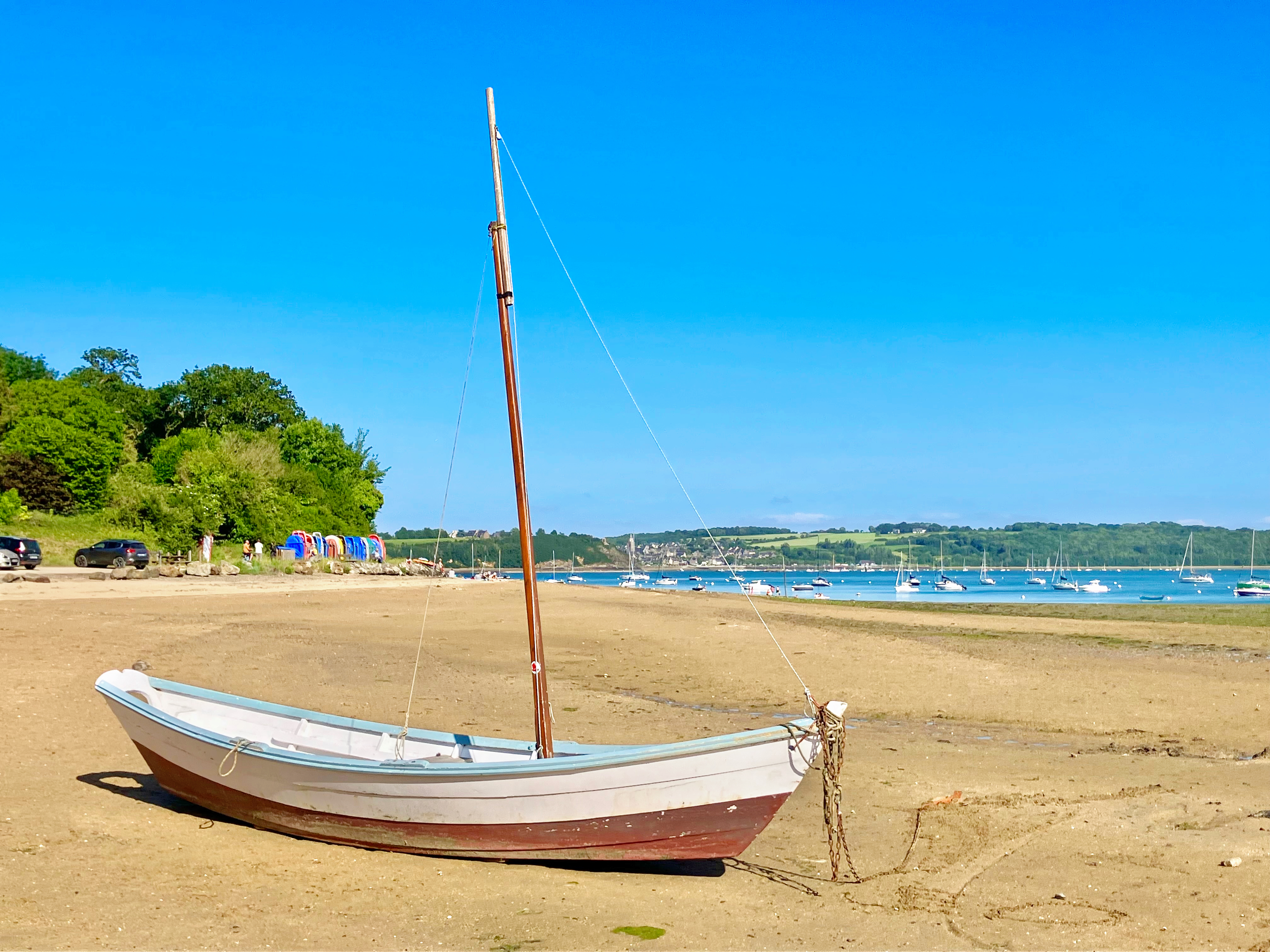
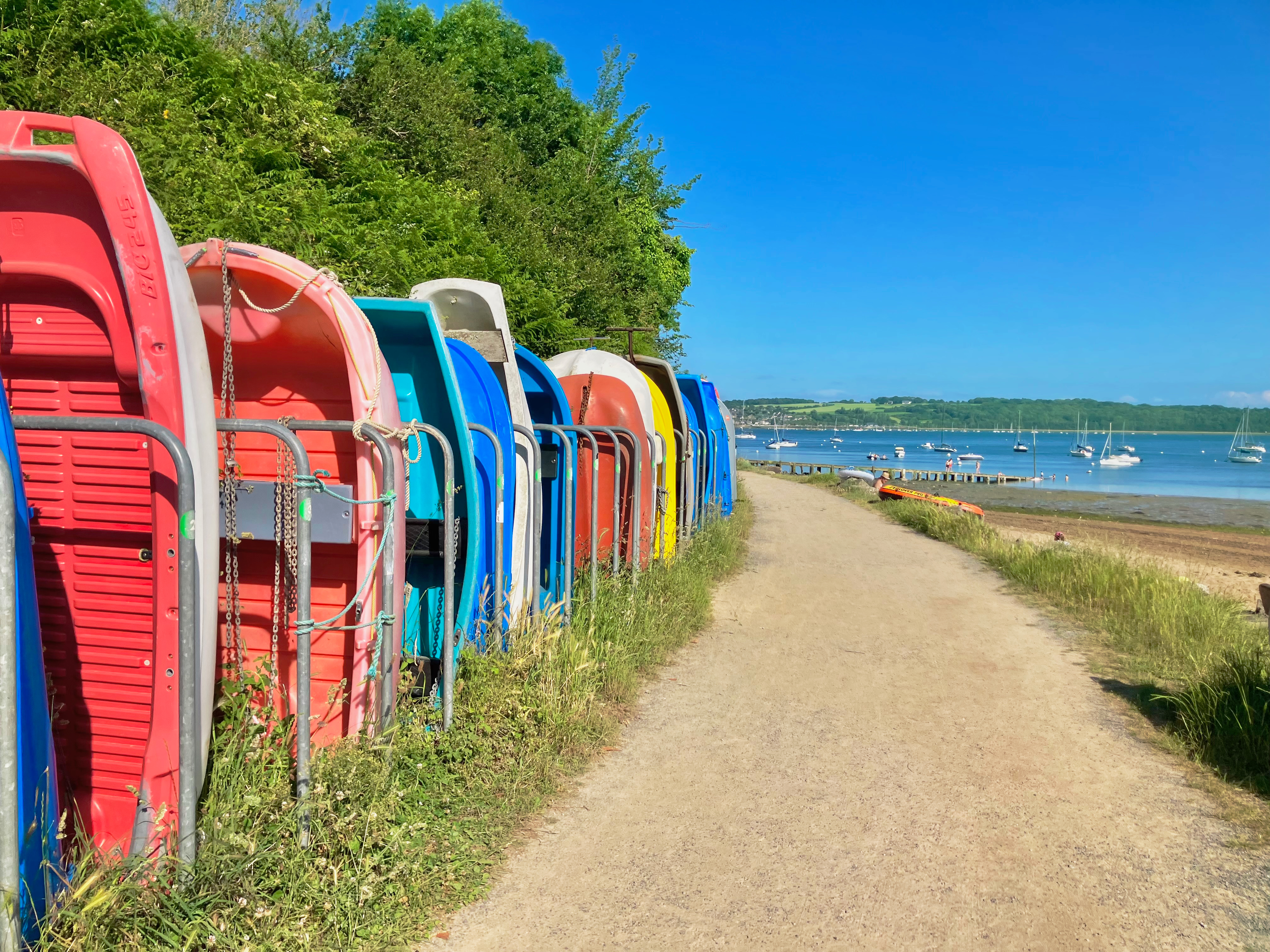
Garel's beach.
- Communes of the Ille-et-Vilaine department
