= Liffré =

Liffré Lifrei (Gallo) Liverieg (Breton)
- Commune
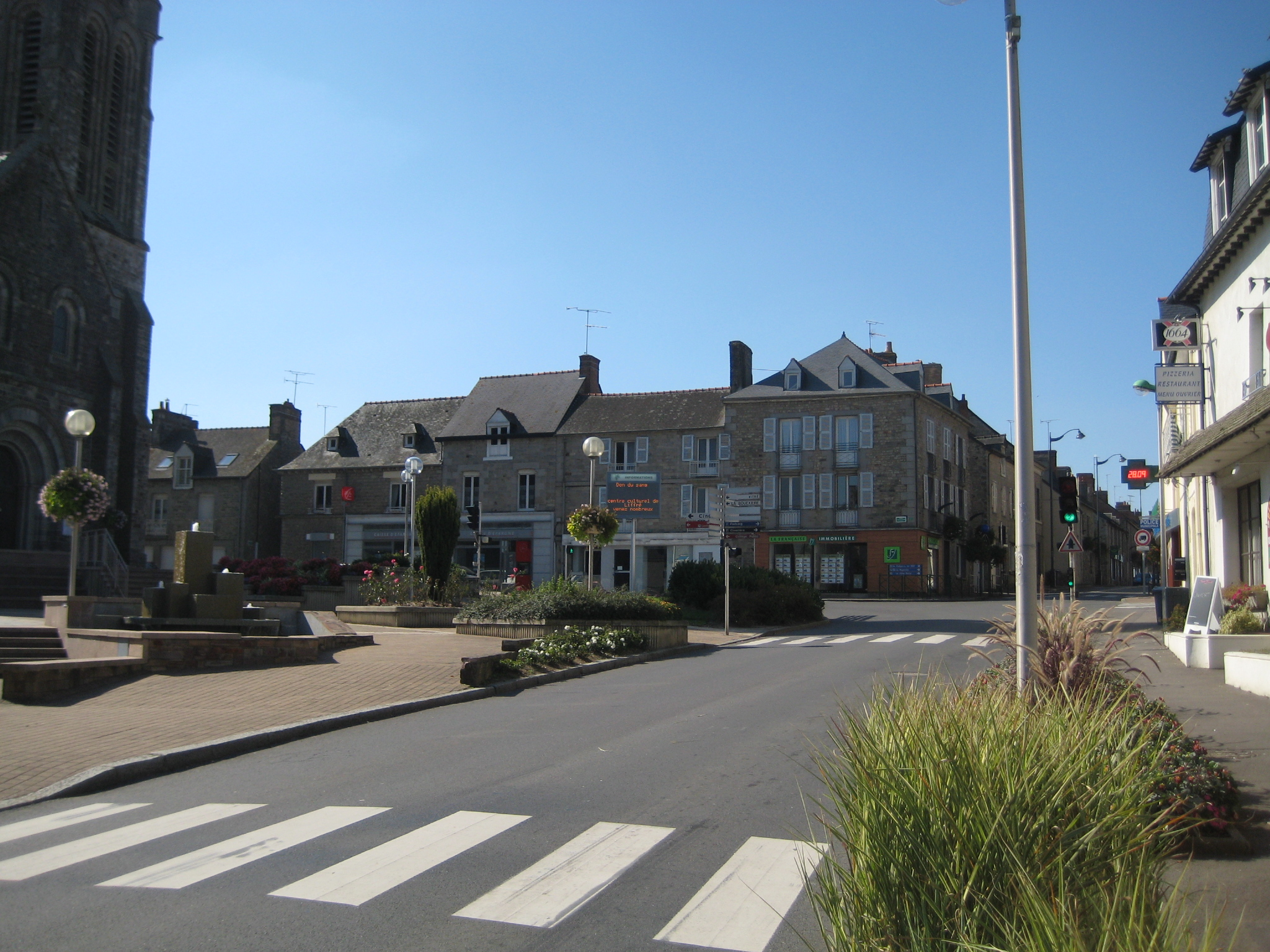
- The town centre of Liffré

- Coat of arms
- Location of Liffré
- Location within France Location within Brittany
- Coordinates: 48°12′51″N 1°30′24″W
- Country: France
- Region: Brittany
- Department: Ille-et-Vilaine
- Arrondissement: Rennes
- Canton: Liffré
- Intercommunality: Liffré-Cormier

Government
  - Mayor (2020–2026): Guillaume Bégué
- Area^{1}: 66.86 km^{2} (25.81 sq mi)
- Elevation: 95 m (312 ft)
- Highest elevation: 113 m (371 ft)
- Lowest elevation: 40 m (130 ft)
- Population (2023): 9,339
  - Density: 139.7/km^{2} (361.8/sq mi)
- Demonym(s): Liffréens, Liffréennes
- Time zone: UTC+01:00 (CET)
  - Summer (DST): UTC+02:00 (CEST)
- INSEE/Postal code: 35152 /35340
- ^{1} French Land Register data, which excludes lakes, ponds, glaciers > 1 km^{2} (0.386 sq mi or 247 acres) and river estuaries.

Liffré (French pronunciation: [lifʁe]; Breton: Liverieg; Gallo: Lifrei) is a commune in the Ille-et-Vilaine department in Brittany in northwestern France. It is in the center of the region.

== Politics and administration ==
List of successive mayors of Liffré since 1945
In office		Name	Party	Capacity	Ref.
?	?	Émile Planty	SFIO		
May 1953	March 1965	Jean Vincent	UNR	General councillor of the Canton of Liffré (1961–1965)	
March 1965	March 1971	Jean Touffet			
March 1971	March 1983	Louis Lorant	DVD	Substitute Deputy for Jacques Cressard (1973–1978)	
March 1983	March 2008	Clément Théaudin	PS	Deputy of Ille-et-Vilaine's 1st constituency (1981–1986) Deputy of Ille-et-Vilaine (1986–1988) General councillor of the Canton of Liffré (1978—1992 then 1998–2015) President of the CC du Pays de Liffré (2000–2008)	
March 2008	22 June 2017 (Resigned)	Loïg Chesnais-Girard	PS	Regional councillor of Brittany (2010—) President of the Regional Council of Brittany (2017—present) President of the Liffré-Cormier Communauté (2008–2020)	
23 September 2017	Incumbent	Guillaume Bégué	PS	Vice-president of the Liffré-Cormier Communauté (2016—present) Interim mayor between 22 June and 23 September 2017.	

== Population ==
Inhabitants of Liffré are called Liffréens in French.

Historical population
Year	Pop.	±% p.a.
1968	2,322	—
1975	3,237	+4.86%
1982	4,205	+3.81%
1990	5,659	+3.78%
1999	6,454	+1.47%
2007	6,611	+0.30%
2012	7,041	+1.27%
2017	7,609	+1.56%
2023	9,339	+3.47%
Source: INSEE

== Twin towns ==
Liffré is twinned with:

- (United Kingdom) Wendover, England
- Piéla, Burkina Faso
- Beniel, Spain

== See also ==
- Communes of the Ille-et-Vilaine department
