= Canton of Saint-Brice-en-Coglès =

Coordinates: 48°24′03″N 1°20′33″W

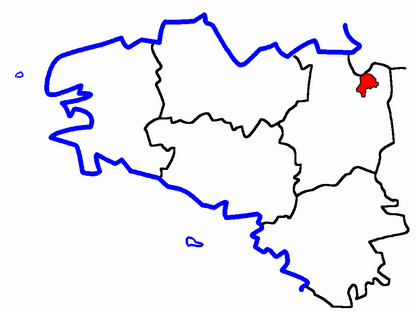

The canton of Saint-Brice-en-Coglès is a former canton of France, located in the arrondissement of Fougères-Vitré, in the Ille-et-Vilaine département, Brittany région. It had 12,106 inhabitants (2012). It was disbanded following the French canton reorganisation which came into effect in March 2015. It consisted of 11 communes, which joined the canton of Antrain in 2015.

== Composition ==
The canton comprised the following communes:

- Baillé
- Le Châtellier
- Coglès
- Montours
- Saint-Brice-en-Coglès
- Saint-Étienne-en-Coglès
- Saint-Hilaire-des-Landes
- Saint-Germain-en-Coglès
- Saint-Marc-le-Blanc
- La Selle-en-Coglès
- Le Tiercent
