= Saint-Brice-en-Coglès =

Saint-Brice-en-Coglès Sant-Brizh-Gougleiz
- Part of Maen Roch
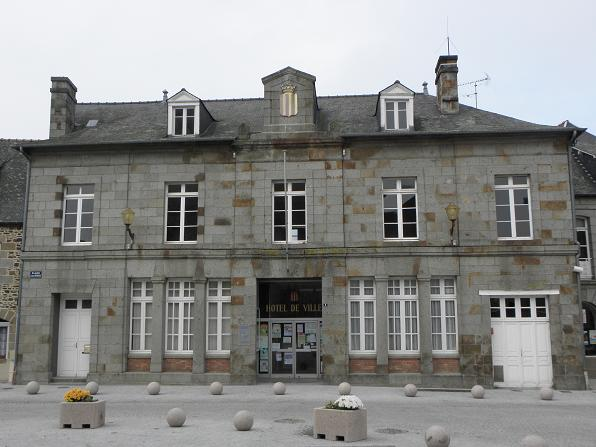
- Town hall

- Coat of arms
- Location of Saint-Brice-en-Coglès
- Location within France Location within Brittany
- Coordinates: 48°24′41″N 1°21′57″W
- Country: France
- Region: Brittany
- Department: Ille-et-Vilaine
- Arrondissement: Fougères-Vitré
- Canton: Antrain
- Commune: Maen Roch
- Area^{1}: 16.46 km^{2} (6.36 sq mi)
- Highest elevation: 124 m (407 ft)
- Lowest elevation: 80 m (260 ft)
- Population (2022): 3,110
  - Density: 189/km^{2} (489/sq mi)
- Time zone: UTC+01:00 (CET)
  - Summer (DST): UTC+02:00 (CEST)
- Postal code: 35460
- ^{1} French Land Register data, which excludes lakes, ponds, glaciers > 1 km^{2} (0.386 sq mi or 247 acres) and river estuaries.

Saint-Brice-en-Coglès (French pronunciation: [sɛ̃ bʁis ɑ̃ kɔɡl], pronounced as Saint-Brice-en-Cogles; Breton: Sant-Brizh-Gougleiz) is a former commune in the Ille-et-Vilaine department in Brittany in northwestern France. On 1 January 2017, it was merged into the new commune Maen Roch.

== Geography ==
Saint-Brice-en-Coglès is located at 46 km (29 mi) northeast of Rennes and 29 km (18 mi) south of Mont Saint-Michel. The neighboring communes are Coglès, La Selle-en-Coglès, Saint-Étienne-en-Coglès, Baillé, Saint-Marc-le-Blanc, and Tremblay.

== Population ==
Inhabitants of Saint-Brice-en-Coglès are called briçois in French.

Historical population
| Year | Pop. | ±% p.a. |
|---|---|---|
| 1962 | 1,962 | — |
| 1968 | 2,045 | +0.69% |
| 1975 | 2,403 | +2.33% |
| 1982 | 2,477 | +0.43% |
| 1990 | 2,484 | +0.04% |
| 1999 | 2,395 | −0.40% |
| 2022 | 3,110 | +1.14% |
Source: EHESS and INSEE

== See also ==
- Communes of the Ille-et-Vilaine department
