= Vieux-Vy-sur-Couesnon =

Vieux-Vy-sur-Couesnon Vioez-Vic (Gallo) Henwig-ar-C'houenon (Breton)
- Commune
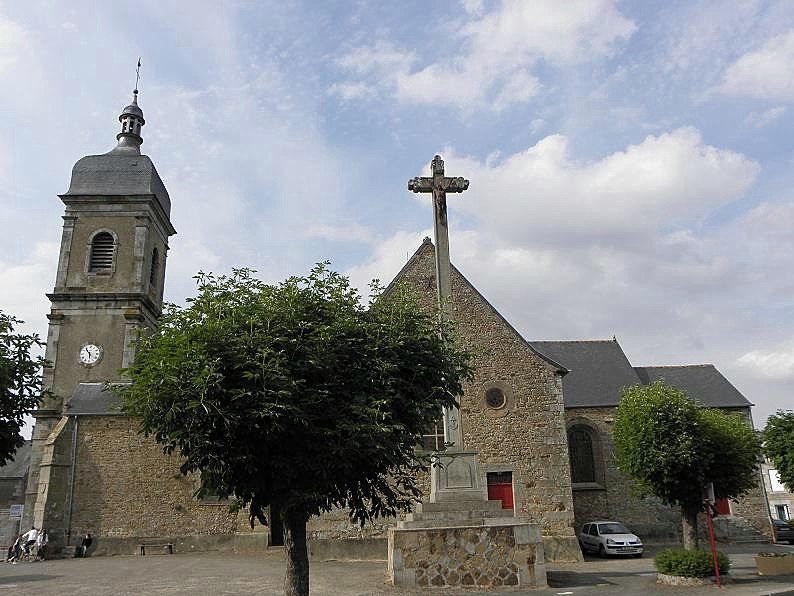
- The church in Vieux-Vy-sur-Couesnon
- Location of Vieux-Vy-sur-Couesnon
- Location within France Location within Brittany
- Coordinates: 48°20′33″N 1°29′18″W
- Country: France
- Region: Brittany
- Department: Ille-et-Vilaine
- Arrondissement: Rennes
- Canton: Val-Couesnon

Government
  - Mayor (2020–2026): Pascal Dewasmes
- Area^{1}: 21.56 km^{2} (8.32 sq mi)
- Highest elevation: 107 m (351 ft)
- Lowest elevation: 22 m (72 ft)
- Population (2023): 1,286
  - Density: 59.65/km^{2} (154.5/sq mi)
- Time zone: UTC+01:00 (CET)
  - Summer (DST): UTC+02:00 (CEST)
- INSEE/Postal code: 35355 /35490
- ^{1} French Land Register data, which excludes lakes, ponds, glaciers > 1 km^{2} (0.386 sq mi or 247 acres) and river estuaries.

Vieux-Vy-sur-Couesnon (French pronunciation: [vjø vi syʁ kwenɔ̃], literally Vieux-Vy on Couesnon; Breton: Henwig-ar-C'houenon; Gallo: Vioez-Vic) is a commune in the Ille-et-Vilaine department in Brittany in northwestern France.

== Geography ==
Vieux-Vy-sur-Couesnon is located on the Couesnon River 33 km northeast of Rennes and 35 km (22 mi) south of Mont Saint-Michel.

The neighboring communes are Romazy, Chauvigné, Saint-Christophe-de-Valains, Saint-Ouen-des-Alleux, Mézières-sur-Couesnon, Gahard, and Sens-de-Bretagne.

== History ==
The name Vieux-Vy-sur-Couesnon probably comes from the Latin Vetus Victus, "old market town." The settlement has had this name since at least 1063.

== Economy ==
Industries:

- Silver-lead ore was mined in the 19th century at a place called Brais. The mine was closed in 1956.
- A granite quarry is still in operation in the northeast, not far from the former mine site.

== Population ==
Inhabitants of Vieux-Vy-sur-Couesnon are called Vieuxviciens in French.

Historical population
Year	Pop.	±% p.a.
1968	941	—
1975	928	−0.20%
1982	835	−1.50%
1990	863	+0.41%
1999	861	−0.03%
2007	1,069	+2.74%
2012	1,119	+0.92%
2017	1,216	+1.68%
2023	1,286	+0.94%
Source: INSEE

== Transportation ==
The village is served by just one bus route, the Rennes/Antrain line.

== Sights ==
- The Saint-Germain church, most of which dates from the seventeenth century, although certain parts date from the eleventh century. The organ was installed in 1883.
- The Chateau of Moulinet, dating from the nineteenth century.
- The Grotto of Brais (dedicated to the Virgin Mary).
- Within the village boundaries there are seven watermills on the Couesnon river. These are mainly paper mills.
- The cyclopean Wall of Orange (from the Iron Age).
- A trough-shaped granite sarcophagus, first mentioned in 1020, located at the door to the church.

== See also ==
- Communes of the Ille-et-Vilaine department
