= Chauvigné =

Chauvigné Chauveinyaé (Gallo) Kelvinieg (Breton)
- Commune
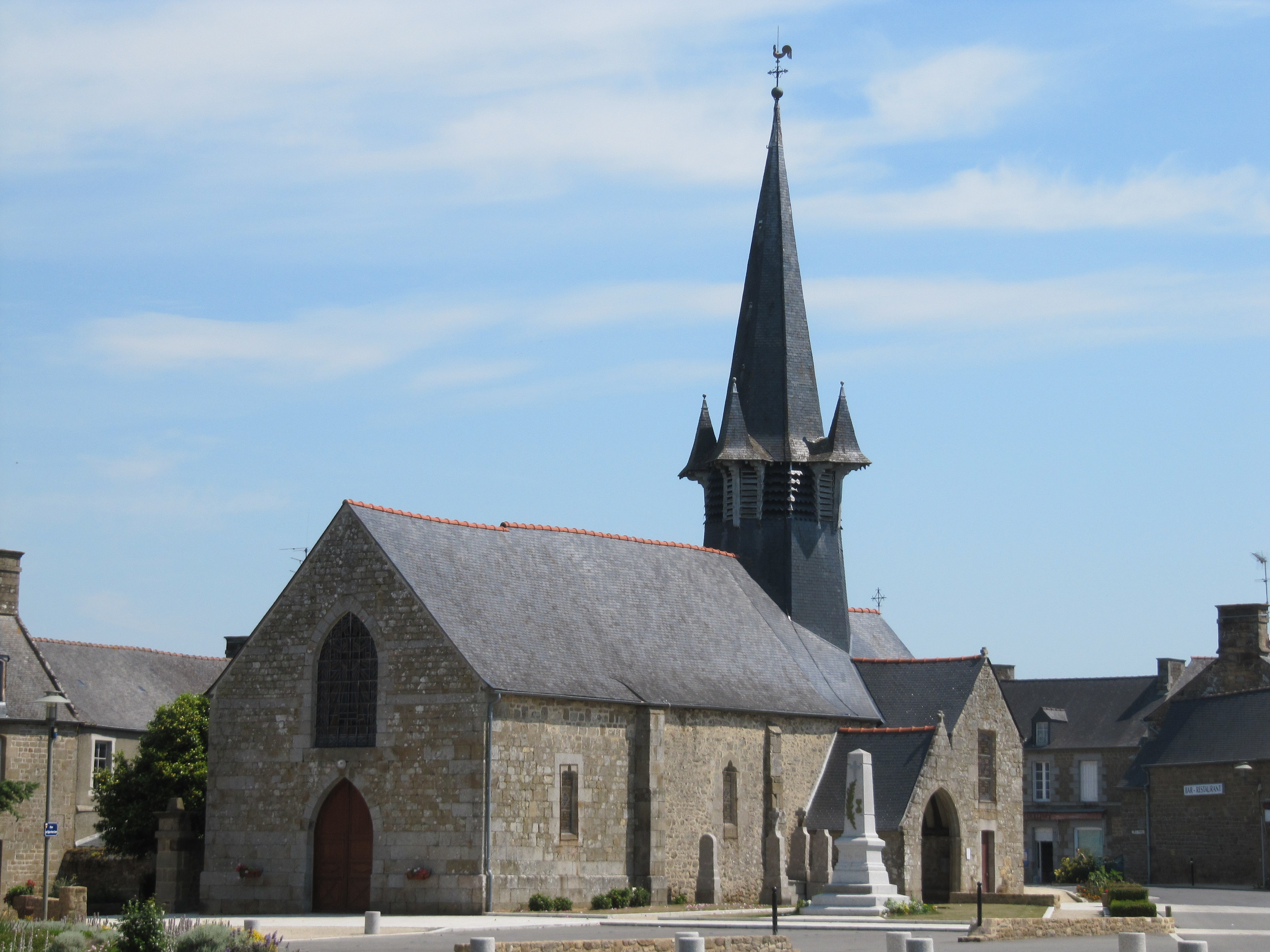
- The church of Chauvigné

- Coat of arms
- Location of Chauvigné
- Location within France Location within Brittany
- Coordinates: 48°22′36″N 1°27′32″W
- Country: France
- Region: Brittany
- Department: Ille-et-Vilaine
- Arrondissement: Fougères-Vitré
- Canton: Val-Couesnon

Government
  - Mayor (2020–2026): Henri Rault
- Area^{1}: 17.71 km^{2} (6.84 sq mi)
- Highest elevation: 107 m (351 ft)
- Lowest elevation: 30 m (98 ft)
- Population (2023): 810
  - Density: 46/km^{2} (120/sq mi)
- Time zone: UTC+01:00 (CET)
  - Summer (DST): UTC+02:00 (CEST)
- INSEE/Postal code: 35075 /35490
- ^{1} French Land Register data, which excludes lakes, ponds, glaciers > 1 km^{2} (0.386 sq mi or 247 acres) and river estuaries.

Chauvigné (French pronunciation: [ʃoviɲe]; Breton: Kelvinieg; Gallo: Chauveinyaé) is a commune in the Ille-et-Vilaine department in Brittany in northwestern France.

== Geography ==
Chauvigné is located at 38 km (24 mi) northeast of Rennes and 30 km (19 mi) south of the Mont Saint-Michel.

The communes bordering are Tremblay, Saint-Marc-le-Blanc, Le Tiercent, Saint-Christophe-de-Valains, Vieux-Vy-sur-Couesnon and Romazy.

== Population ==
Historical population
Year	Pop.	±% p.a.
1968	741	—
1975	704	−0.73%
1982	617	−1.87%
1990	566	−1.07%
1999	575	+0.18%
2007	730	+3.03%
2012	804	+1.95%
2017	845	+1.00%
2023	810	−0.70%
Source: INSEE

Inhabitants of Chauvigné are called Chauvignéens in French.

== See also ==
- Communes of the Ille-et-Vilaine department
