= Saint-Hilaire-des-Landes =

Saint-Hilaire-des-Landes Sant-Eler-al-Lann (Breton)
- Commune
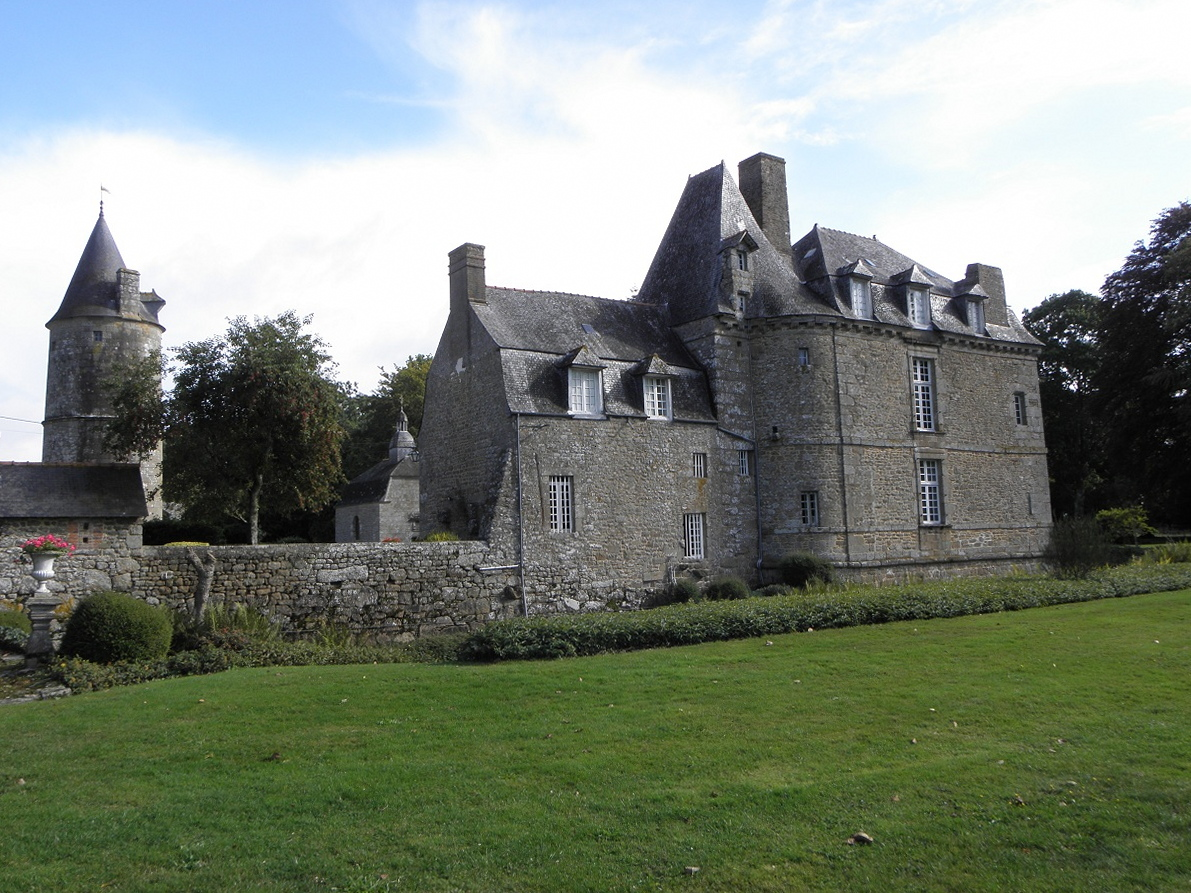
- The Château de La Haye, in Saint-Hilaire-des-Landes

- Coat of arms
- Location of Saint-Hilaire-des-Landes
- Location within France Location within Brittany
- Coordinates: 48°21′08″N 1°21′24″W
- Country: France
- Region: Brittany
- Department: Ille-et-Vilaine
- Arrondissement: Fougères-Vitré
- Canton: Val-Couesnon

Government
  - Mayor (2020–2026): Claude Hamard
- Area^{1}: 18.27 km^{2} (7.05 sq mi)
- Elevation: 115 m (377 ft)
- Highest elevation: 117 m (384 ft)
- Lowest elevation: 54 m (177 ft)
- Population (2023): 1,037
  - Density: 56.76/km^{2} (147.0/sq mi)
- Time zone: UTC+01:00 (CET)
  - Summer (DST): UTC+02:00 (CEST)
- INSEE/Postal code: 35280 /35140
- ^{1} French Land Register data, which excludes lakes, ponds, glaciers > 1 km^{2} (0.386 sq mi or 247 acres) and river estuaries.

Saint-Hilaire-des-Landes (French pronunciation: [sɛ̃.t‿ilɛʁ de lɑ̃d]; Breton: Sant-Eler-al-Lann) is a commune in the Ille-et-Vilaine department in Brittany in northwestern France.

== Geography ==
Saint-Hilaire-des-Landes is located 41 km (25 mi) northeast of Rennes and 37 km (23 mi) south of Mont Saint-Michel.

The adjacent communes are Le Tiercent, Baillé, Saint-Étienne-en-Coglès, Saint-Sauveur-des-Landes, Saint-Marc-sur-Couesnon, and Saint-Ouen-des-Alleux.

== Population ==
Historical population
| Year | Pop. | ±% p.a. |
|---|---|---|
| 1968 | 1,010 | — |
| 1975 | 807 | −3.15% |
| 1982 | 756 | −0.93% |
| 1990 | 893 | +2.10% |
| 1999 | 922 | +0.36% |
| 2007 | 993 | +0.93% |
| 2012 | 1,005 | +0.24% |
| 2017 | 1,038 | +0.65% |
| 2023 | 1,037 | −0.02% |
Source: INSEE

== See also ==
- Communes of the Ille-et-Vilaine department
