= Noyal-sous-Bazouges =

Noyal-sous-Bazouges Noal-Bazeleg (Breton)
- Commune
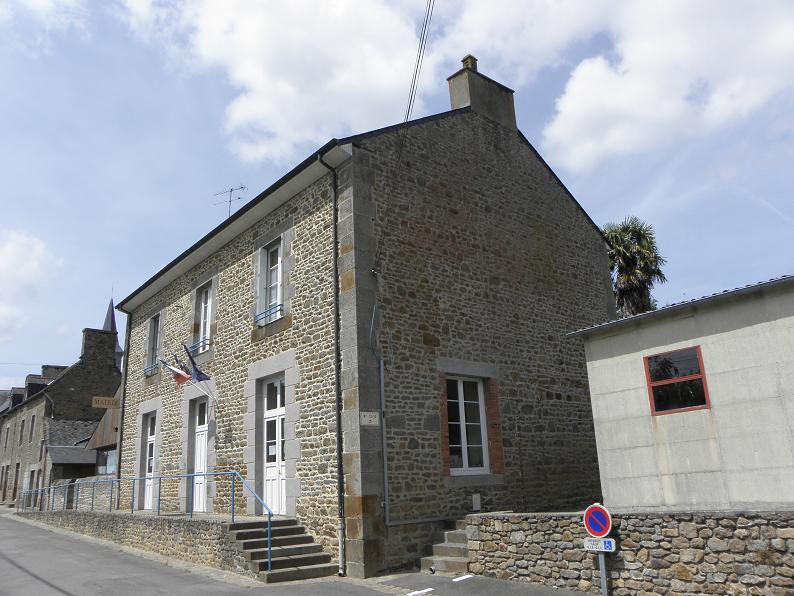
- The town hall of Noyal-sous-Bazouges
- Location of Noyal-sous-Bazouges
- Location within France Location within Brittany
- Coordinates: 48°24′51″N 1°37′23″W
- Country: France
- Region: Brittany
- Department: Ille-et-Vilaine
- Arrondissement: Fougères-Vitré
- Canton: Val-Couesnon

Government
  - Mayor (2020–2026): Bertrand Mallet
- Area^{1}: 14.83 km^{2} (5.73 sq mi)
- Highest elevation: 109 m (358 ft)
- Lowest elevation: 25 m (82 ft)
- Population (2023): 392
  - Density: 26.4/km^{2} (68.5/sq mi)
- Time zone: UTC+01:00 (CET)
  - Summer (DST): UTC+02:00 (CEST)
- INSEE/Postal code: 35205 /35560
- ^{1} French Land Register data, which excludes lakes, ponds, glaciers > 1 km^{2} (0.386 sq mi or 247 acres) and river estuaries.

Noyal-sous-Bazouges (French pronunciation: [nwajal su bazuʒ], literally Noyal under Bazouges; Breton: Noal-Bazeleg) is a commune in the Ille-et-Vilaine department in Brittany in northwestern France.

== Population ==
Inhabitants of Noyal-sous-Bazouges are called Noyalais in French.

Historical population
Year	Pop.	±% p.a.
1968	520	—
1975	502	−0.50%
1982	447	−1.64%
1990	378	−2.07%
1999	379	+0.03%
2007	374	−0.17%
2012	385	+0.58%
2017	385	+0.00%
2023	392	+0.30%
Source: INSEE

== See also ==
- Communes of the Ille-et-Vilaine department
