= Les Portes du Coglais =

Les Portes du Coglais Dorioù-ar-Gougleiz (Breton)
- Commune
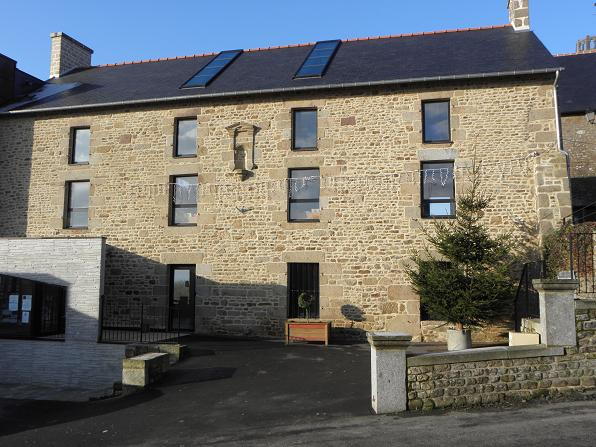
- The town hall of Les Portes du Coglais
- Location of Les Portes du Coglais
- Location within France Location within Brittany
- Coordinates: 48°26′38″N 1°18′29″W
- Country: France
- Region: Brittany
- Department: Ille-et-Vilaine
- Arrondissement: Fougères-Vitré
- Canton: Val-Couesnon
- Intercommunality: Couesnon Marches de Bretagne

Government
  - Mayor (2020–2026): Aymar de Gouvion Saint-Cyr
- Area^{1}: 40.71 km^{2} (15.72 sq mi)
- Population (2023): 2,208
  - Density: 54.24/km^{2} (140.5/sq mi)
- Time zone: UTC+01:00 (CET)
  - Summer (DST): UTC+02:00 (CEST)
- INSEE/Postal code: 35191 /35460
- ^{1} French Land Register data, which excludes lakes, ponds, glaciers > 1 km^{2} (0.386 sq mi or 247 acres) and river estuaries.

Les Portes du Coglais (French pronunciation: [le pɔʁt dy kɔɡlɛ]; Breton: Dorioù-ar-Gougleiz) is a commune in the department of Ille-et-Vilaine, western France. The municipality was established on 1 January 2017 by merger of the former communes of Montours (the seat), Coglès and La Selle-en-Coglès.

== Population ==
Population data refer to the commune in its geography as of January 2025.

Historical population
Year	Pop.	±% p.a.
1968	2,415	—
1975	2,180	−1.45%
1982	1,950	−1.58%
1990	1,880	−0.46%
1999	1,819	−0.37%
2007	2,129	+1.99%
2012	2,317	+1.71%
2017	2,391	+0.63%
2023	2,208	−1.32%
Source: INSEE

== See also ==
- Communes of the Ille-et-Vilaine department
