= Marcillé-Raoul =

Marcillé-Raoul Marcilhae-Raóll (Gallo) Marc'helleg-Raoul (Breton)
- Commune
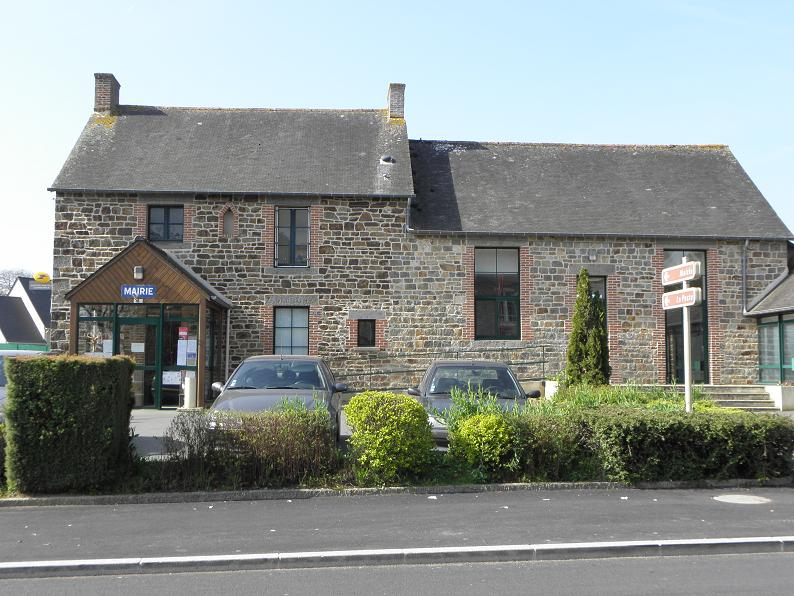
- The town hall in Marcillé-Raoul
- Location of Marcillé-Raoul
- Location within France Location within Brittany
- Coordinates: 48°23′16″N 1°36′17″W
- Country: France
- Region: Brittany
- Department: Ille-et-Vilaine
- Arrondissement: Fougères-Vitré
- Canton: Val-Couesnon

Government
  - Mayor (2020–2026): Jean-Claude Boulmer
- Area^{1}: 22.41 km^{2} (8.65 sq mi)
- Highest elevation: 91 m (299 ft)
- Lowest elevation: 25 m (82 ft)
- Population (2023): 749
  - Density: 33.4/km^{2} (86.6/sq mi)
- Time zone: UTC+01:00 (CET)
  - Summer (DST): UTC+02:00 (CEST)
- INSEE/Postal code: 35164 /35560
- ^{1} French Land Register data, which excludes lakes, ponds, glaciers > 1 km^{2} (0.386 sq mi or 247 acres) and river estuaries.

Marcillé-Raoul (French pronunciation: [maʁsije ʁaul]; Breton: Marc'helleg-Raoul; Gallo: Marcilhae-Raóll) is a commune in the Ille-et-Vilaine department in Brittany in northwestern France.

== Population ==
Inhabitants of Marcillé-Raoul are called Marcilléens in French.

Historical population
| Year | Pop. | ±% p.a. |
|---|---|---|
| 1968 | 712 | — |
| 1975 | 755 | +0.84% |
| 1982 | 677 | −1.55% |
| 1990 | 683 | +0.11% |
| 1999 | 660 | −0.38% |
| 2007 | 801 | +2.45% |
| 2012 | 809 | +0.20% |
| 2017 | 766 | −1.09% |
| 2023 | 749 | −0.37% |
Source: INSEE

== See also ==
- Communes of the Ille-et-Vilaine department
