= Le Châtellier, Ille-et-Vilaine =

Le Châtellier Le Chastelier (Gallo) Kasteller (Breton)
- Commune
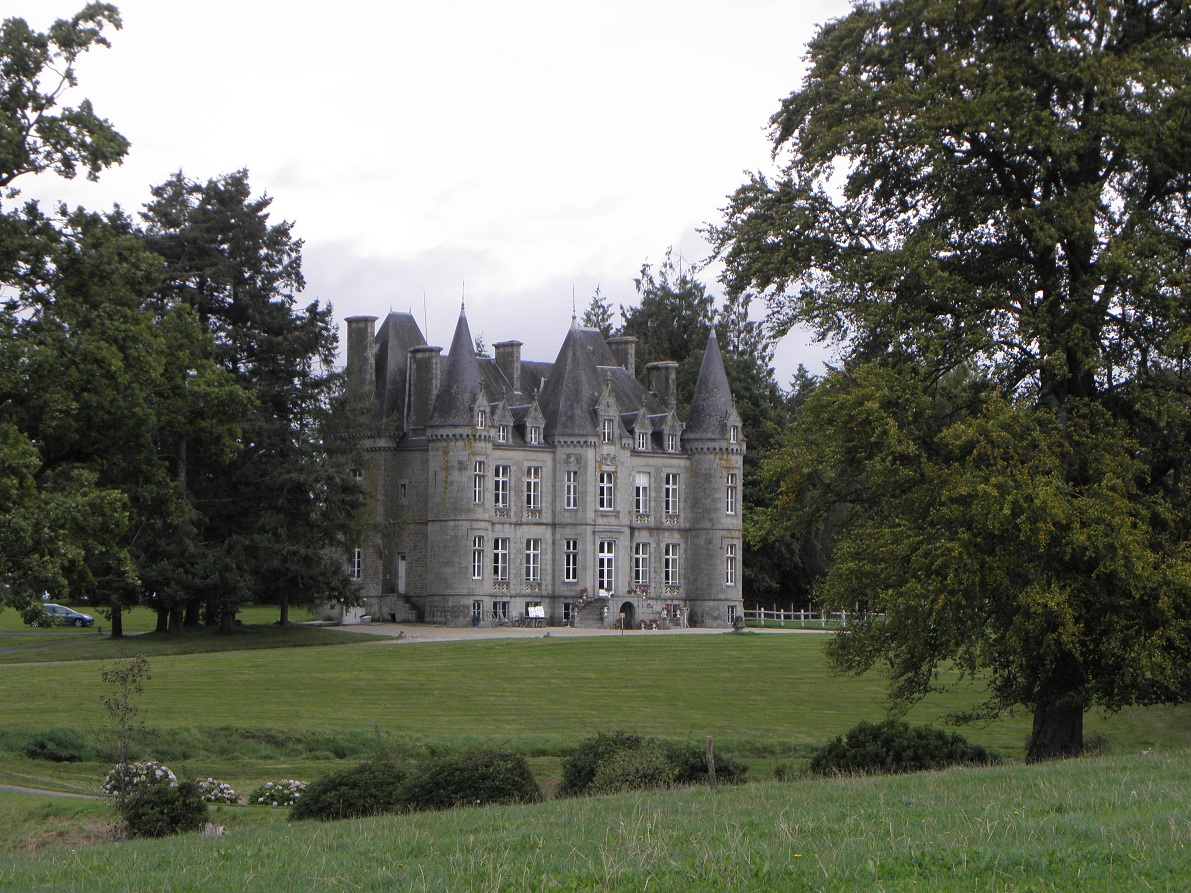
- Château de La Vieuville

- Coat of arms
- Location of Le Châtellier
- Location within France Location within Brittany
- Coordinates: 48°25′00″N 1°15′10″W
- Country: France
- Region: Brittany
- Department: Ille-et-Vilaine
- Arrondissement: Fougères-Vitré
- Canton: Val-Couesnon

Government
  - Mayor (2020–2026): Pierre Sourdin
- Area^{1}: 13.43 km^{2} (5.19 sq mi)
- Highest elevation: 183 m (600 ft)
- Lowest elevation: 119 m (390 ft)
- Population (2023): 430
  - Density: 32/km^{2} (83/sq mi)
- Time zone: UTC+01:00 (CET)
  - Summer (DST): UTC+02:00 (CEST)
- INSEE/Postal code: 35071 /35133
- ^{1} French Land Register data, which excludes lakes, ponds, glaciers > 1 km^{2} (0.386 sq mi or 247 acres) and river estuaries.

Le Châtellier (French pronunciation: [lə ʃatəlje]; Breton: Kasteller; Gallo: Le Chastelier) is a commune in the Ille-et-Vilaine Department in Brittany in northwestern France.

== Population ==
Inhabitants of Le Châtellier are called Castellérois or Castellégiens in French.

Historical population
Year	Pop.	±% p.a.
1968	501	—
1975	444	−1.71%
1982	407	−1.24%
1990	407	+0.00%
1999	393	−0.39%
2007	380	−0.42%
2012	376	−0.21%
2017	427	+2.58%
2023	430	+0.12%
Source: INSEE

== Horticulture ==
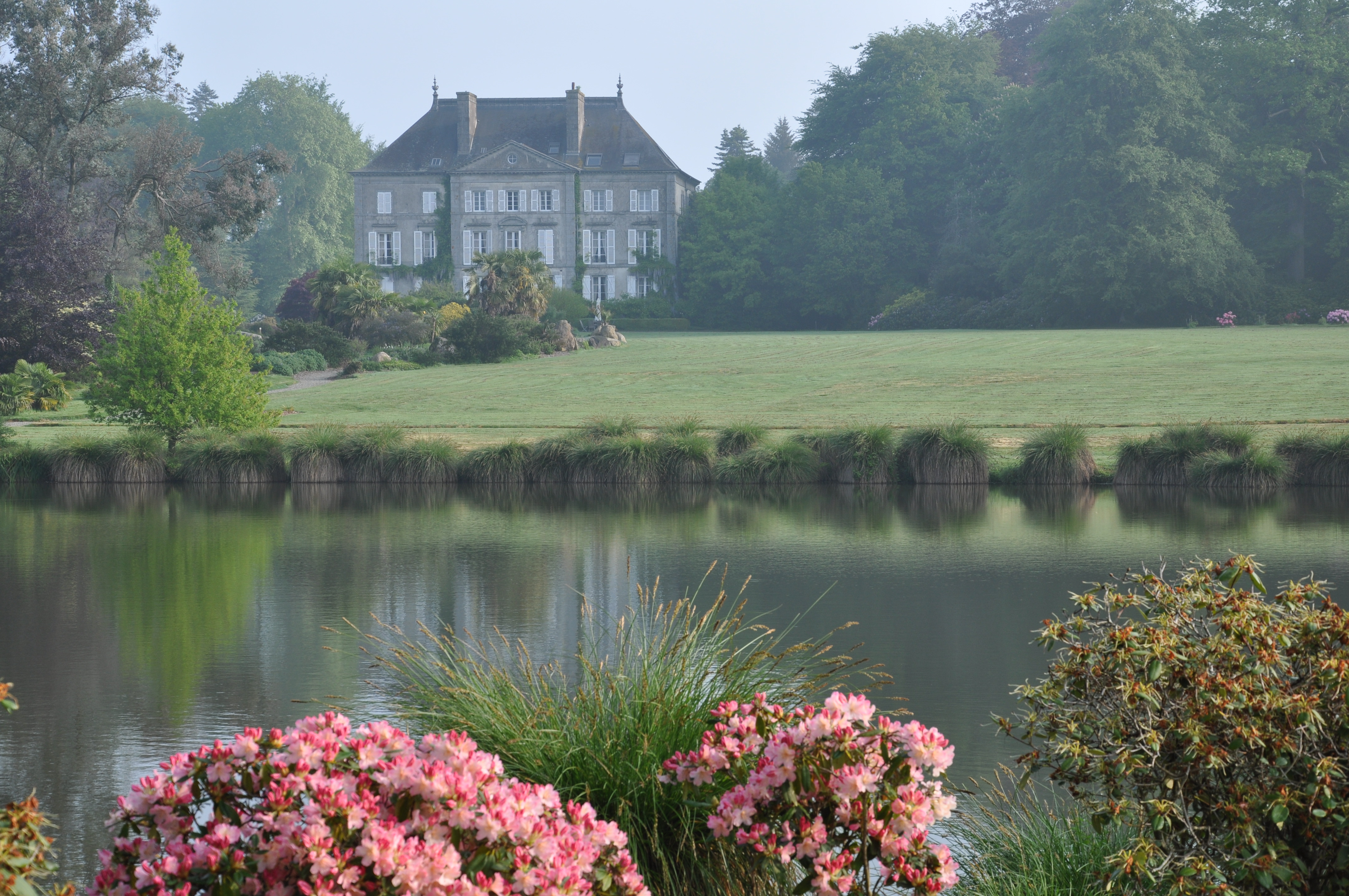
Botanical garden of Haute-Bretagne

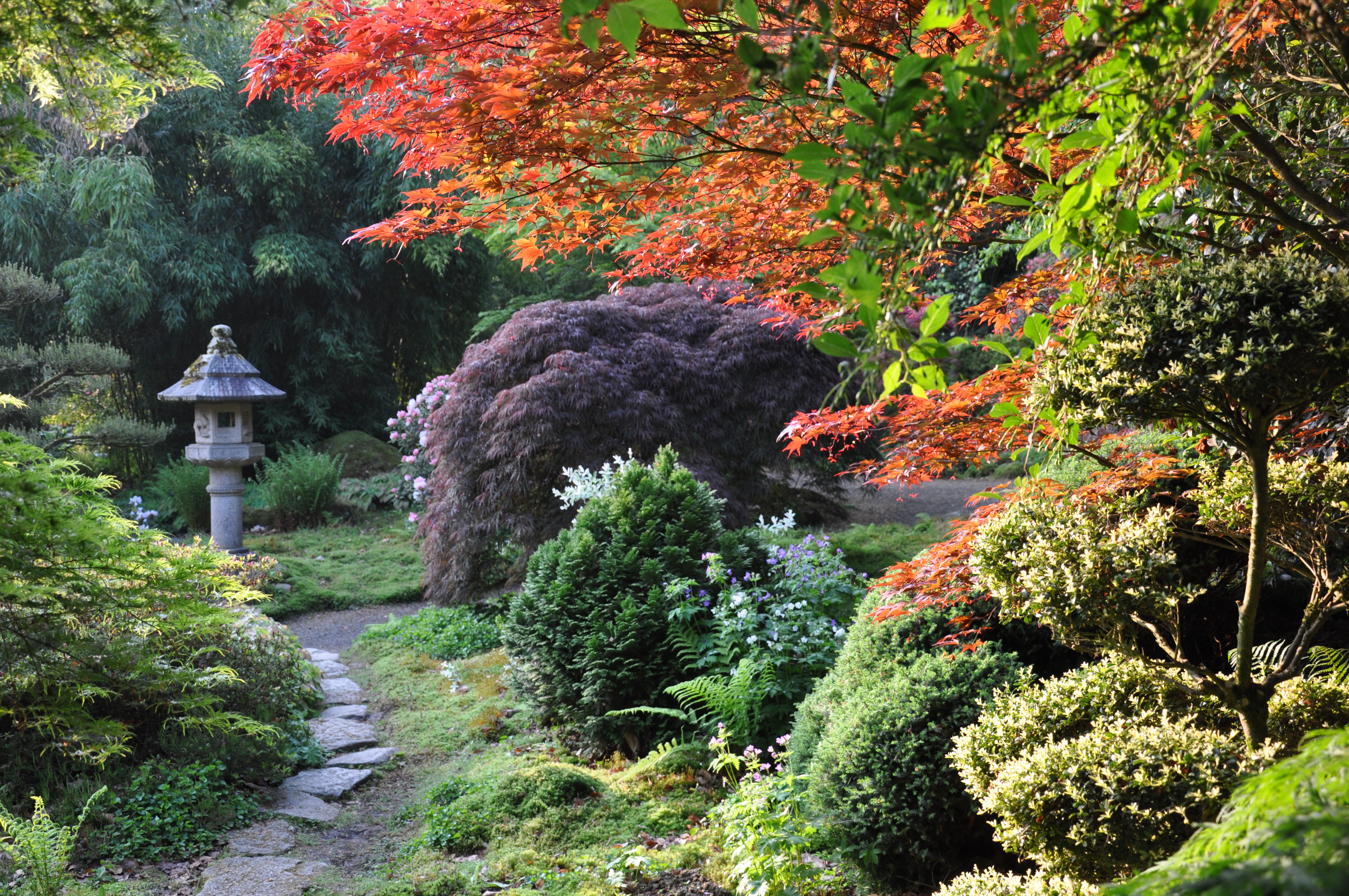
The garden of the rising sun

The Botanical garden of Upper Brittany is located in Le Châtellier.

== See also ==
- Communes of the Ille-et-Vilaine department
