= Le Tiercent =

Le Tiercent Le Tierczant (Gallo) An Tergant (Breton)
- Commune
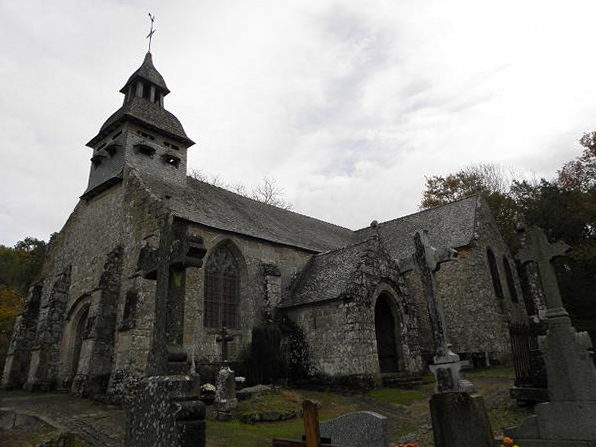
- The church in Le Tiercent

- Coat of arms
- Location of Le Tiercent
- Location within France Location within Brittany
- Coordinates: 48°21′00″N 1°24′18″W
- Country: France
- Region: Brittany
- Department: Ille-et-Vilaine
- Arrondissement: Fougères-Vitré
- Canton: Val-Couesnon

Government
  - Mayor (2020–2026): Christian Hubert
- Area^{1}: 3.70 km^{2} (1.43 sq mi)
- Highest elevation: 98 m (322 ft)
- Lowest elevation: 50 m (160 ft)
- Population (2023): 199
  - Density: 53.8/km^{2} (139/sq mi)
- Time zone: UTC+01:00 (CET)
  - Summer (DST): UTC+02:00 (CEST)
- INSEE/Postal code: 35336 /35460
- ^{1} French Land Register data, which excludes lakes, ponds, glaciers > 1 km^{2} (0.386 sq mi or 247 acres) and river estuaries.

Le Tiercent (French pronunciation: [lə tjɛʁsɑ̃]; Gallo: Le Tierczant, Breton: An Tergant) is a commune in the Ille-et-Vilaine department in Brittany in northwestern France.

== Geography ==
Le Tiercent is located 37 km (23 mi) northeast of Rennes and 35 km (22 mi) south of Mont Saint-Michel.

The neighboring communes are Chauvigné, Saint-Marc-le-Blanc, Baillé, Saint-Hilaire-des-Landes, Saint-Ouen-des-Alleux, and Saint-Christophe-de-Valains.

== Population ==
Inhabitants of Le Tiercent are called Tiercentois in French.

Historical population
| Year | Pop. | ±% p.a. |
|---|---|---|
| 1968 | 229 | — |
| 1975 | 220 | −0.57% |
| 1982 | 218 | −0.13% |
| 1990 | 184 | −2.10% |
| 1999 | 162 | −1.40% |
| 2007 | 172 | +0.75% |
| 2012 | 172 | +0.00% |
| 2017 | 174 | +0.23% |
| 2023 | 199 | +2.26% |
Source: INSEE

== See also ==
- Communes of the Ille-et-Vilaine department
