= Mouazé =

Mouazé Móazae (Gallo) Moezeg (Breton)
- Commune
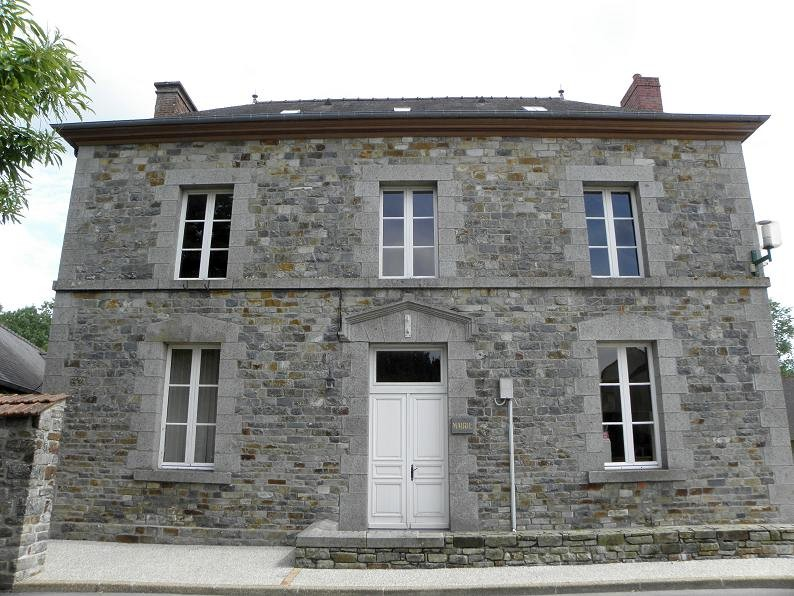
- The town hall of Mouazé

- Coat of arms
- Location of Mouazé
- Location within France Location within Brittany
- Coordinates: 48°13′57″N 1°36′30″W
- Country: France
- Region: Brittany
- Department: Ille-et-Vilaine
- Arrondissement: Rennes
- Canton: Val-Couesnon
- Intercommunality: Val d'Ille-Aubigné

Government
  - Mayor (2020–2026): Frédéric Bougeot
- Area^{1}: 8.39 km^{2} (3.24 sq mi)
- Population (2023): 1,712
  - Density: 204/km^{2} (528/sq mi)
- Time zone: UTC+01:00 (CET)
  - Summer (DST): UTC+02:00 (CEST)
- INSEE/Postal code: 35197 /35250
- Elevation: 32–77 m (105–253 ft)
- ^{1} French Land Register data, which excludes lakes, ponds, glaciers > 1 km^{2} (0.386 sq mi or 247 acres) and river estuaries.

Mouazé (French pronunciation: [mwaze]; Breton: Moezeg; Gallo: Móazae) is a commune in the Ille-et-Vilaine department in Brittany in northwestern France.

== Population ==
Inhabitants of Mouazé are called Mouazéens in French.

Historical population
Year	Pop.	±% p.a.
1968	388	—
1975	553	+5.19%
1982	723	+3.90%
1990	809	+1.41%
1999	917	+1.40%
2007	984	+0.89%
2012	1,201	+4.07%
2017	1,586	+5.72%
2023	1,712	+1.28%
Source: INSEE

== See also ==
- Communes of the Ille-et-Vilaine department
