= Rimou =

Rimou Rivoù (Breton)
- Commune
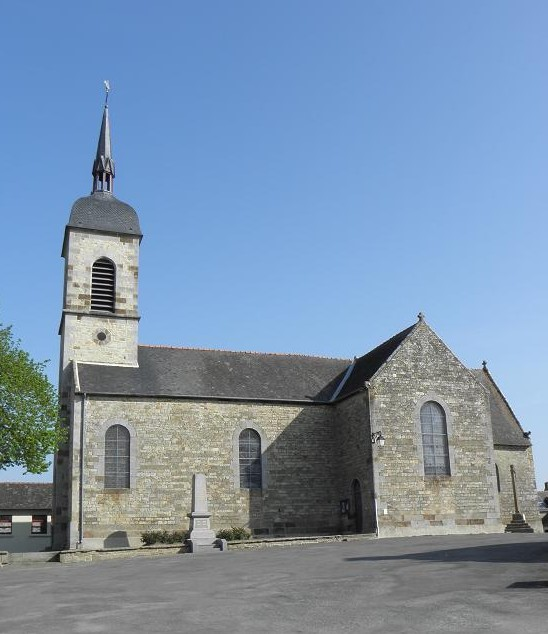
- The church of Notre-Dame, in Rimou
- Location of Rimou
- Location within France Location within Brittany
- Coordinates: 48°24′01″N 1°30′40″W
- Country: France
- Region: Brittany
- Department: Ille-et-Vilaine
- Arrondissement: Fougères-Vitré
- Canton: Val-Couesnon

Government
  - Mayor (2020–2026): Fernande-Raymonde Lohier
- Area^{1}: 13.28 km^{2} (5.13 sq mi)
- Highest elevation: 83 m (272 ft)
- Lowest elevation: 14 m (46 ft)
- Population (2023): 357
  - Density: 26.9/km^{2} (69.6/sq mi)
- Time zone: UTC+01:00 (CET)
  - Summer (DST): UTC+02:00 (CEST)
- INSEE/Postal code: 35242 /35560
- ^{1} French Land Register data, which excludes lakes, ponds, glaciers > 1 km^{2} (0.386 sq mi or 247 acres) and river estuaries.

Rimou (French pronunciation: [ʁimu]; Breton: Rivoù; Gallo: Rimou, before 1989: Rimoux) is a commune in the Ille-et-Vilaine department of Brittany in northwestern France.

== Population ==
Inhabitants of Rimou are called rimois in French.

Historical population
| Year | Pop. | ±% p.a. |
|---|---|---|
| 1968 | 447 | — |
| 1975 | 415 | −1.06% |
| 1982 | 386 | −1.03% |
| 1990 | 351 | −1.18% |
| 1999 | 305 | −1.55% |
| 2007 | 348 | +1.66% |
| 2012 | 346 | −0.12% |
| 2017 | 336 | −0.58% |
| 2023 | 357 | +1.02% |
Source: INSEE

== See also ==
- Communes of the Ille-et-Vilaine department
