= Andouillé-Neuville =

Andouillé-Neuville Andólhae (Gallo & Breton)
- Commune
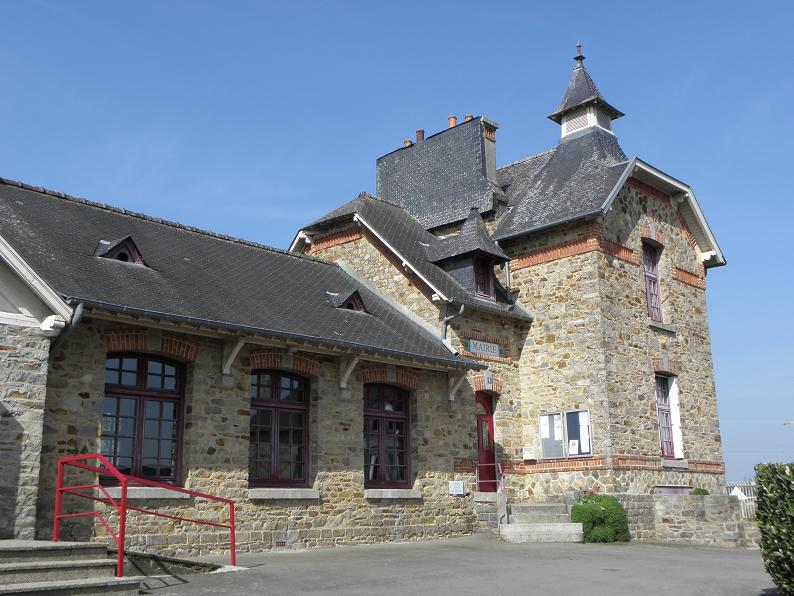
- Town hall
- Location of Andouillé-Neuville
- Location within France Location within Brittany
- Coordinates: 48°17′40″N 1°35′20″W
- Country: France
- Region: Brittany
- Department: Ille-et-Vilaine
- Arrondissement: Rennes
- Canton: Val-Couesnon
- Intercommunality: Val d'Ille-Aubigné

Government
  - Mayor (2021–2026): Aurore Gely-Pernot
- Area^{1}: 12.61 km^{2} (4.87 sq mi)
- Elevation: 60 m (200 ft)
- Highest elevation: 111 m (364 ft)
- Lowest elevation: 52 m (171 ft)
- Population (2023): 1,017
  - Density: 80.65/km^{2} (208.9/sq mi)
- Time zone: UTC+01:00 (CET)
  - Summer (DST): UTC+02:00 (CEST)
- INSEE/Postal code: 35003 /35250
- ^{1} French Land Register data, which excludes lakes, ponds, glaciers > 1 km^{2} (0.386 sq mi or 247 acres) and river estuaries.

Andouillé-Neuville (French pronunciation: [ɑ̃duje nøvil]; Breton: Andólhae; Gallo: Andólhae) is a commune in the Ille-et-Vilaine department in Brittany in northwestern France.

== Population ==
Inhabitants of Andouillé-Neuville are called Andoléens.

Historical population
Year	Pop.	±% p.a.
1968	428	—
1975	398	−1.03%
1982	365	−1.23%
1990	423	+1.86%
1999	504	+1.97%
2007	703	+4.25%
2012	825	+3.25%
2017	886	+1.44%
2023	1,017	+2.32%
Source: INSEE

== Sights ==
The Château de la Magnanne is a local chateau built in the 17th century. The roof has been replaced as a result of a fire in 1893. The departmental archives have preserved the archives of the chateau for the years 1389 to 1790.

== See also ==
- Communes of the Ille-et-Vilaine department
