= Saint-Ouen-des-Alleux =

Saint-Ouen-des-Alleux Sant-Owen-an-Alloz (Breton)
- Commune
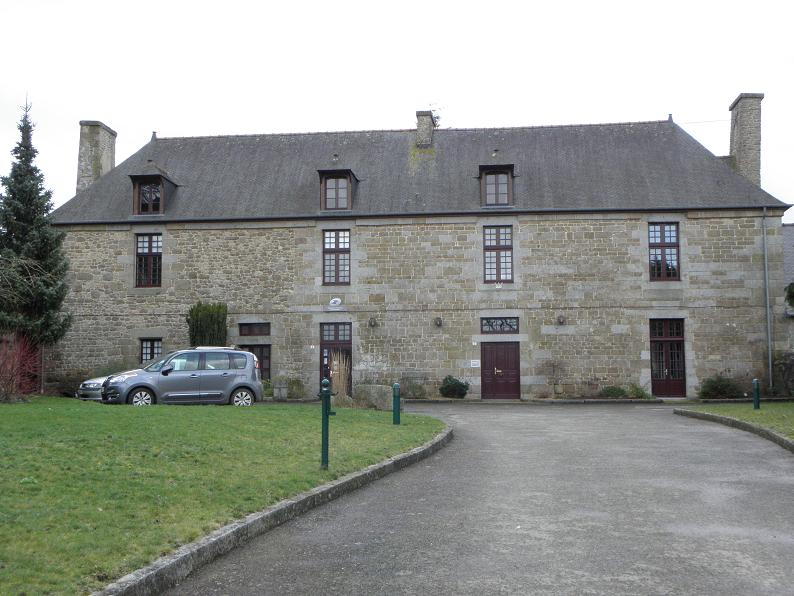
- The town hall of Saint-Ouen-des-Alleux
- Location of Saint-Ouen-des-Alleux
- Location within France Location within Brittany
- Coordinates: 48°19′45″N 1°25′28″W
- Country: France
- Region: Brittany
- Department: Ille-et-Vilaine
- Arrondissement: Fougères-Vitré
- Canton: Fougères-1
- Intercommunality: Fougères Agglomération

Government
  - Mayor (2020–2026): Pierre Thomas
- Area^{1}: 15.20 km^{2} (5.87 sq mi)
- Highest elevation: 106 m (348 ft)
- Lowest elevation: 32 m (105 ft)
- Population (2023): 1,326
  - Density: 87.24/km^{2} (225.9/sq mi)
- Time zone: UTC+01:00 (CET)
  - Summer (DST): UTC+02:00 (CEST)
- INSEE/Postal code: 35304 /35140
- ^{1} French Land Register data, which excludes lakes, ponds, glaciers > 1 km^{2} (0.386 sq mi or 247 acres) and river estuaries.

Saint-Ouen-des-Alleux (French pronunciation: [sɛ̃.t‿wɛ̃ de.z‿alø]; Breton: Sant-Owen-an-Alloz) is a commune in the Ille-et-Vilaine department in Brittany in northwestern France.

== Geography ==
Saint-Ouen-des-Alleux is located 34 km (21 mi) northeast of Rennes and 38 km (24 mi) south of Mont Saint-Michel.

The adjacent communes are Saint-Christophe-de-Valains, Le Tiercent, Saint-Hilaire-des-Landes, Saint-Marc-sur-Couesnon, Mézières-sur-Couesnon, and Vieux-Vy-sur-Couesnon.

== Population ==
Inhabitants of Saint-Ouen-des-Alleux are called audonniens in French.

Historical population
Year	Pop.	±% p.a.
1968	829	—
1975	738	−1.65%
1982	729	−0.18%
1990	797	+1.12%
1999	923	+1.64%
2007	1,229	+3.64%
2012	1,307	+1.24%
2017	1,296	−0.17%
2023	1,326	+0.38%
Source: INSEE

== International relations ==
Saint-Ouen-des-Alleux is twinned with:

- (United Kingdom) St Gennys, Cornwall, England

== See also ==
- Communes of the Ille-et-Vilaine department
