= Feins =

Feins Finioú (Breton)
- Commune
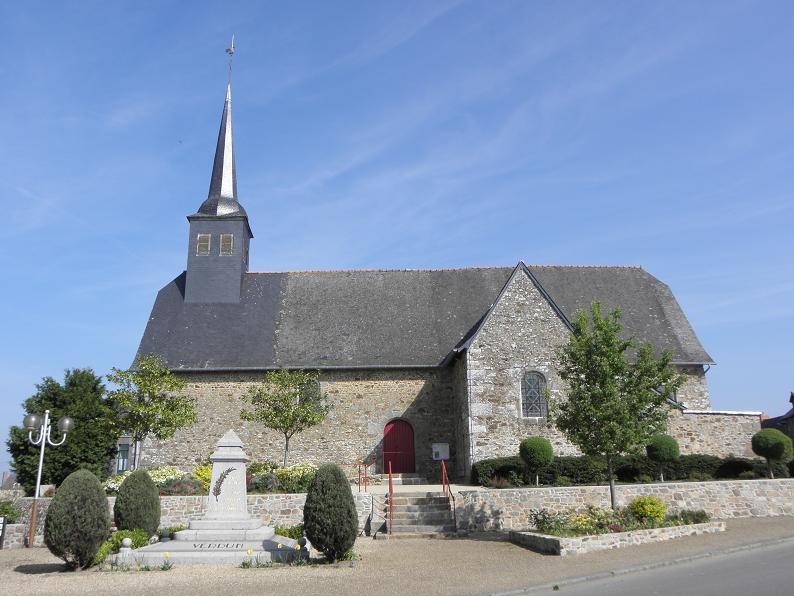
- Saint Martin de Tours church
- Location of Feins
- Location within France Location within Brittany
- Coordinates: 48°19′47″N 1°38′19″W
- Country: France
- Region: Brittany
- Department: Ille-et-Vilaine
- Arrondissement: Rennes
- Canton: Val-Couesnon

Government
  - Mayor (2020–2026): Alain Fouglé
- Area^{1}: 20.35 km^{2} (7.86 sq mi)
- Highest elevation: 104 m (341 ft)
- Lowest elevation: 56 m (184 ft)
- Population (2023): 1,074
  - Density: 52.78/km^{2} (136.7/sq mi)
- Time zone: UTC+01:00 (CET)
  - Summer (DST): UTC+02:00 (CEST)
- INSEE/Postal code: 35110 /35440
- ^{1} French Land Register data, which excludes lakes, ponds, glaciers > 1 km^{2} (0.386 sq mi or 247 acres) and river estuaries.

Feins (Breton: Finioù, Gallo: Feins) is a commune in the Ille-et-Vilaine department in Brittany in northwestern France.

== Population ==
Inhabitants of Feins are called Finésiens in French.

Historical population
Year	Pop.	±% p.a.
1968	659	—
1975	606	−1.19%
1982	601	−0.12%
1990	658	+1.14%
1999	710	+0.85%
2007	780	+1.18%
2012	888	+2.63%
2017	977	+1.93%
2023	1,074	+1.59%
Source: INSEE

== See also ==
- Communes of the Ille-et-Vilaine department
