= Saint-Rémy-du-Plain =

Saint-Rémy-du-Plain Sant-Revig-ar-Plaen (Breton)
- Commune
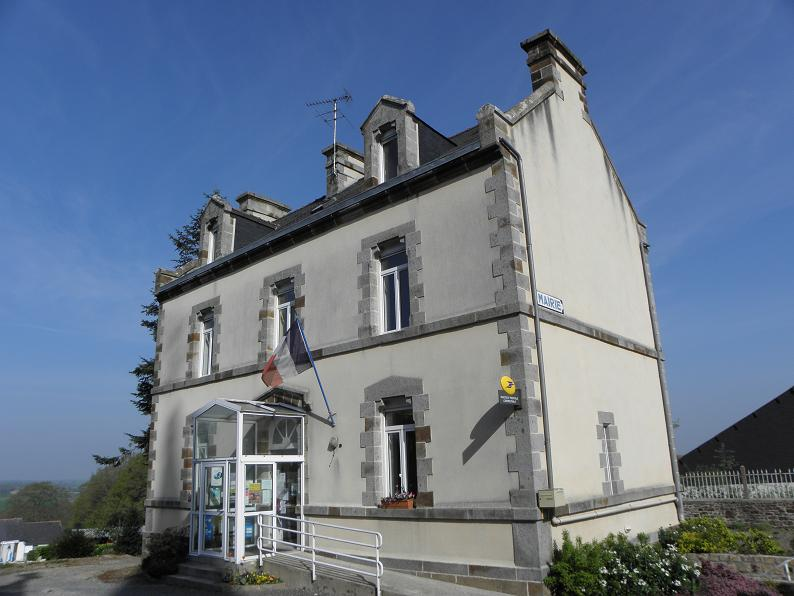
- The town hall of Saint-Rémy-du-Plain
- Location of Saint-Rémy-du-Plain
- Location within France Location within Brittany
- Coordinates: 48°22′16″N 1°34′13″W
- Country: France
- Region: Brittany
- Department: Ille-et-Vilaine
- Arrondissement: Fougères-Vitré
- Canton: Val-Couesnon

Government
  - Mayor (2020–2026): Dominique Prioul
- Area^{1}: 14.87 km^{2} (5.74 sq mi)
- Highest elevation: 105 m (344 ft)
- Lowest elevation: 23 m (75 ft)
- Population (2023): 818
  - Density: 55.0/km^{2} (142/sq mi)
- Time zone: UTC+01:00 (CET)
  - Summer (DST): UTC+02:00 (CEST)
- INSEE/Postal code: 35309 /35560
- ^{1} French Land Register data, which excludes lakes, ponds, glaciers > 1 km^{2} (0.386 sq mi or 247 acres) and river estuaries.

Saint-Rémy-du-Plain (French pronunciation: [sɛ̃ ʁemi dy plɛ̃]; Breton: Sant-Revig-ar-Plaen) is a commune in the Ille-et-Vilaine department in Brittany in northwestern France.

== Population ==
Inhabitants of Saint-Rémy-du-Plain are called rémois in French.

Historical population
Year	Pop.	±% p.a.
1968	561	—
1975	561	+0.00%
1982	548	−0.33%
1990	590	+0.93%
1999	580	−0.19%
2007	704	+2.45%
2012	839	+3.57%
2017	828	−0.26%
2023	818	−0.20%
Source: INSEE

== See also ==
- Communes of the Ille-et-Vilaine department
