= Maen Roch =

Maen Roch Maen Roc'h (Breton)
- Commune
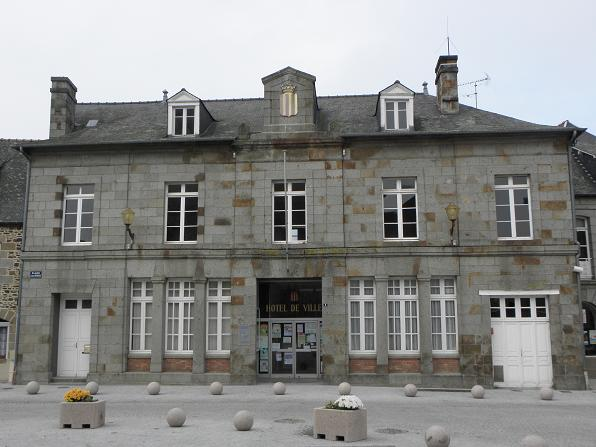
- The town hall of Saint-Brice-en-Coglès
- Location of Maen Roch
- Location within France Location within Brittany
- Coordinates: 48°24′40″N 1°21′58″W
- Country: France
- Region: Brittany
- Department: Ille-et-Vilaine
- Arrondissement: Fougères-Vitré
- Canton: Val-Couesnon
- Intercommunality: Couesnon Marches de Bretagne

Government
  - Mayor (2020–2026): Thomas Janvier
- Area^{1}: 39.11 km^{2} (15.10 sq mi)
- Population (2023): 5,088
  - Density: 130.1/km^{2} (336.9/sq mi)
- Time zone: UTC+01:00 (CET)
  - Summer (DST): UTC+02:00 (CEST)
- INSEE/Postal code: 35257 /35460
- ^{1} French Land Register data, which excludes lakes, ponds, glaciers > 1 km^{2} (0.386 sq mi or 247 acres) and river estuaries.

Maen Roch (French pronunciation: [mɛn ʁɔk]; literally meaning "Rock Rock" in both Gallo and Breton; Breton: Maen Roc'h) is a commune in the department of Ille-et-Vilaine, western France. The municipality was established on 1 January 2017 by merger of the former communes of Saint-Brice-en-Coglès (the seat) and Saint-Étienne-en-Coglès.

Saint-Brice-en-Coglèse is listed as a Village étape.

== Population ==
Population data refer to the commune in its geography as of January 2025.

Historical population
Year	Pop.	±% p.a.
1968	3,475	—
1975	3,742	+1.06%
1982	3,899	+0.59%
1990	3,945	+0.15%
1999	3,825	−0.34%
2007	4,312	+1.51%
2012	4,592	+1.27%
2017	4,850	+1.10%
2023	5,088	+0.80%
Source: INSEE

== See also ==
- Communes of the Ille-et-Vilaine department
