= Montours =

Montours Montourz
- Part of Les Portes du Coglais
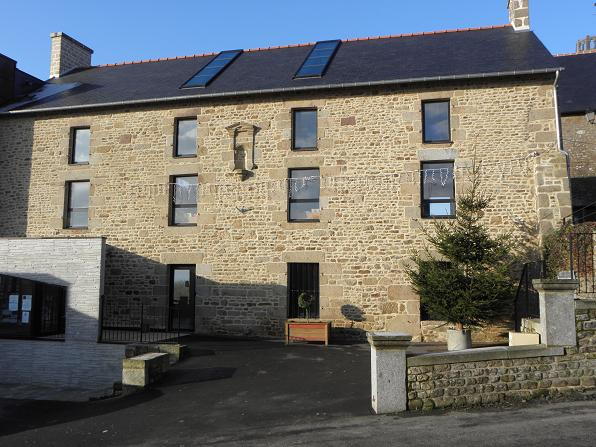
- The town hall of Montours
- Location of Montours
- Location within France Location within Brittany
- Coordinates: 48°26′37″N 1°18′28″W
- Country: France
- Region: Brittany
- Department: Ille-et-Vilaine
- Arrondissement: Fougères-Vitré
- Canton: Antrain
- Commune: Les Portes du Coglais
- Area^{1}: 15.27 km^{2} (5.90 sq mi)
- Highest elevation: 184 m (604 ft)
- Lowest elevation: 108 m (354 ft)
- Population (2022): 1,045
  - Density: 68.43/km^{2} (177.2/sq mi)
- Time zone: UTC+01:00 (CET)
  - Summer (DST): UTC+02:00 (CEST)
- Postal code: 35460
- ^{1} French Land Register data, which excludes lakes, ponds, glaciers > 1 km^{2} (0.386 sq mi or 247 acres) and river estuaries.

Montours (French pronunciation: [mɔ̃tuʁ]; Breton: Montourz; Gallo: Montórs) is a former commune in the Ille-et-Vilaine department of Brittany in northwestern France. On 1 January 2017, it was merged into the new commune Les Portes du Coglais.

== Population ==
Inhabitants of Montours are called Montourois in French.

Historical population
Year	Pop.	±% p.a.
1962	1,088	—
1968	1,040	−0.75%
1975	940	−1.43%
1982	807	−2.16%
1990	810	+0.05%
1999	806	−0.05%
2022	1,045	+1.14%
Source: EHESS and INSEE

== See also ==
- Communes of the Ille-et-Vilaine department
