= Saint-Christophe-de-Valains =

Saint-Christophe-de-Valains Sant-Kristol-Gwalen (Breton)
- Commune
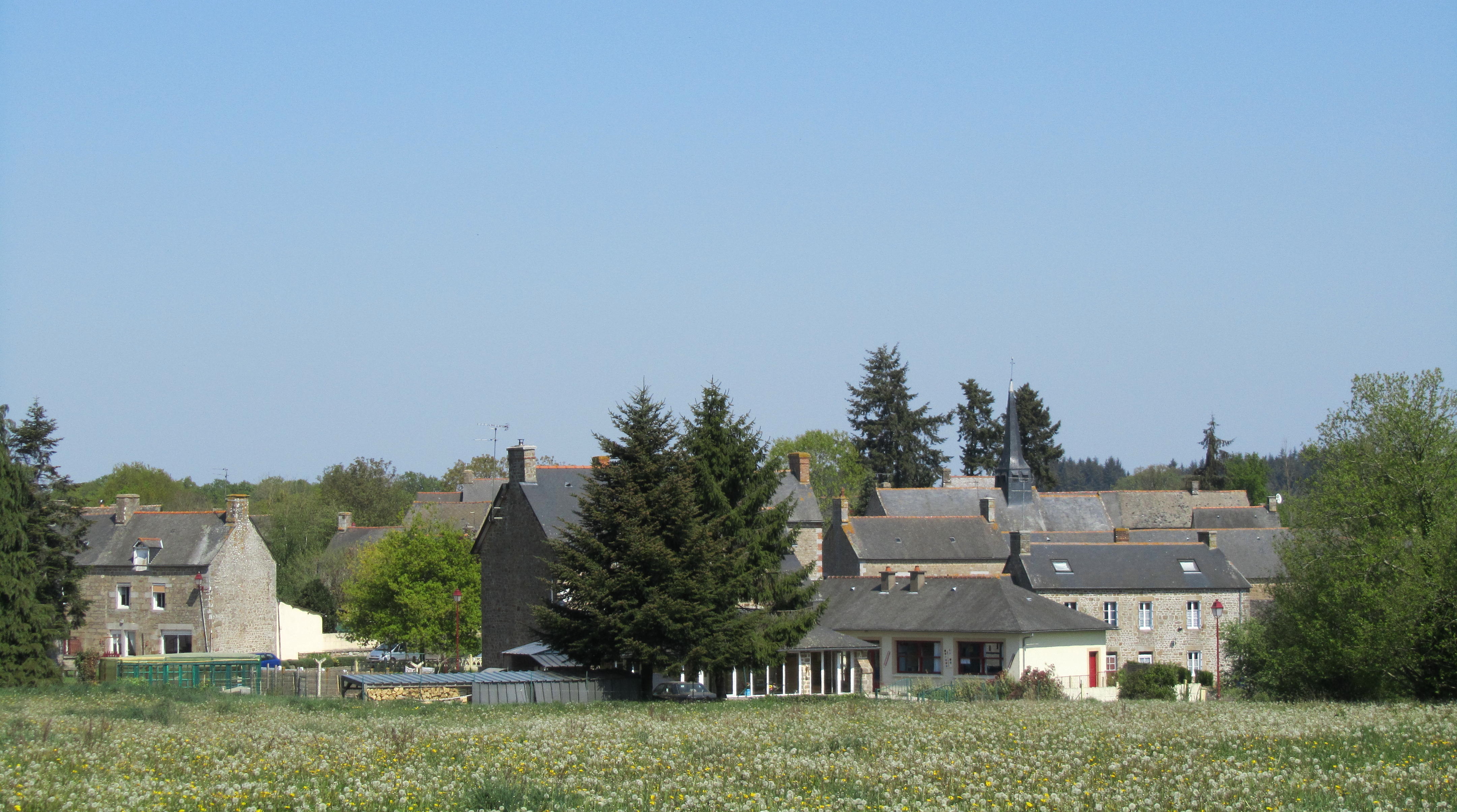
- A general view of Saint-Christophe-de-Valains
- Location of Saint-Christophe-de-Valains
- Location within France Location within Brittany
- Coordinates: 48°20′37″N 1°26′46″W
- Country: France
- Region: Brittany
- Department: Ille-et-Vilaine
- Arrondissement: Fougères-Vitré
- Canton: Fougères-1
- Intercommunality: Fougères Agglomération

Government
  - Mayor (2020–2026): Michelle Garavaglia
- Area^{1}: 3.27 km^{2} (1.26 sq mi)
- Elevation: 75 m (246 ft)
- Highest elevation: 104 m (341 ft)
- Lowest elevation: 35 m (115 ft)
- Population (2023): 231
  - Density: 70.6/km^{2} (183/sq mi)
- Time zone: UTC+01:00 (CET)
  - Summer (DST): UTC+02:00 (CEST)
- INSEE/Postal code: 35261 /35140
- ^{1} French Land Register data, which excludes lakes, ponds, glaciers > 1 km^{2} (0.386 sq mi or 247 acres) and river estuaries.

Saint-Christophe-de-Valains (French pronunciation: [sɛ̃ kʁistɔf də valɛ̃]; Breton: Sant-Kristol-Gwalen) is a commune in the Ille-et-Vilaine department in Brittany in northwestern France.

Saint-Christophe-de-Valains comes from Saint Christopher, patron saint of travelers and Valains, fief of Vieux-Vy-sur-Couesnon.

== Population ==
Historical population
Year	Pop.	±% p.a.
1968	151	—
1975	129	−2.22%
1982	107	−2.64%
1990	106	−0.12%
1999	138	+2.97%
2007	161	+1.95%
2012	225	+6.92%
2017	225	+0.00%
2023	231	+0.44%
Source: INSEE

== Geography ==
Saint-Christophe-de-Valains is located 37 km (23 mi) to the northeast of Rennes and 35 km (22 mi) to the south of the Mont Saint-Michel.

The neighboring communes are Chauvigné, Le Tiercent, Saint-Ouen-des-Alleux, and Vieux-Vy-sur-Couesnon.

== Sights ==
- Parish Church of the 15th century.
- Castle of La Bélinaye 17th century.
- Liberty Oak in La Basse-Haye.
- Valley of "La Minette".
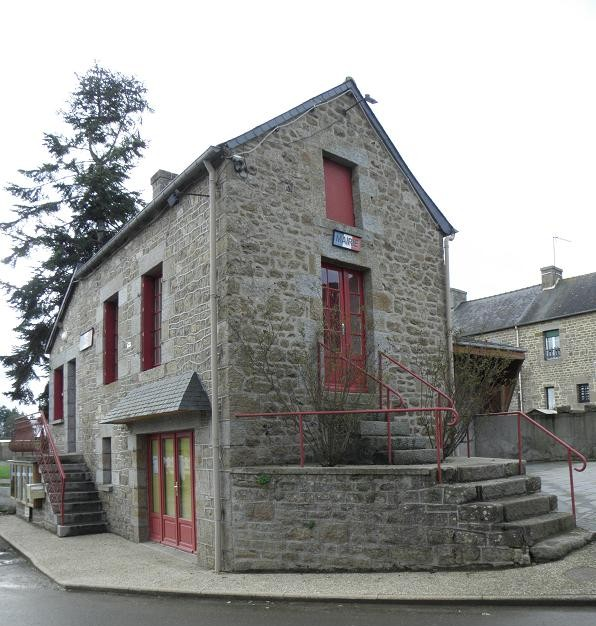
Town hall of Saint-Christophe-de-Valains.

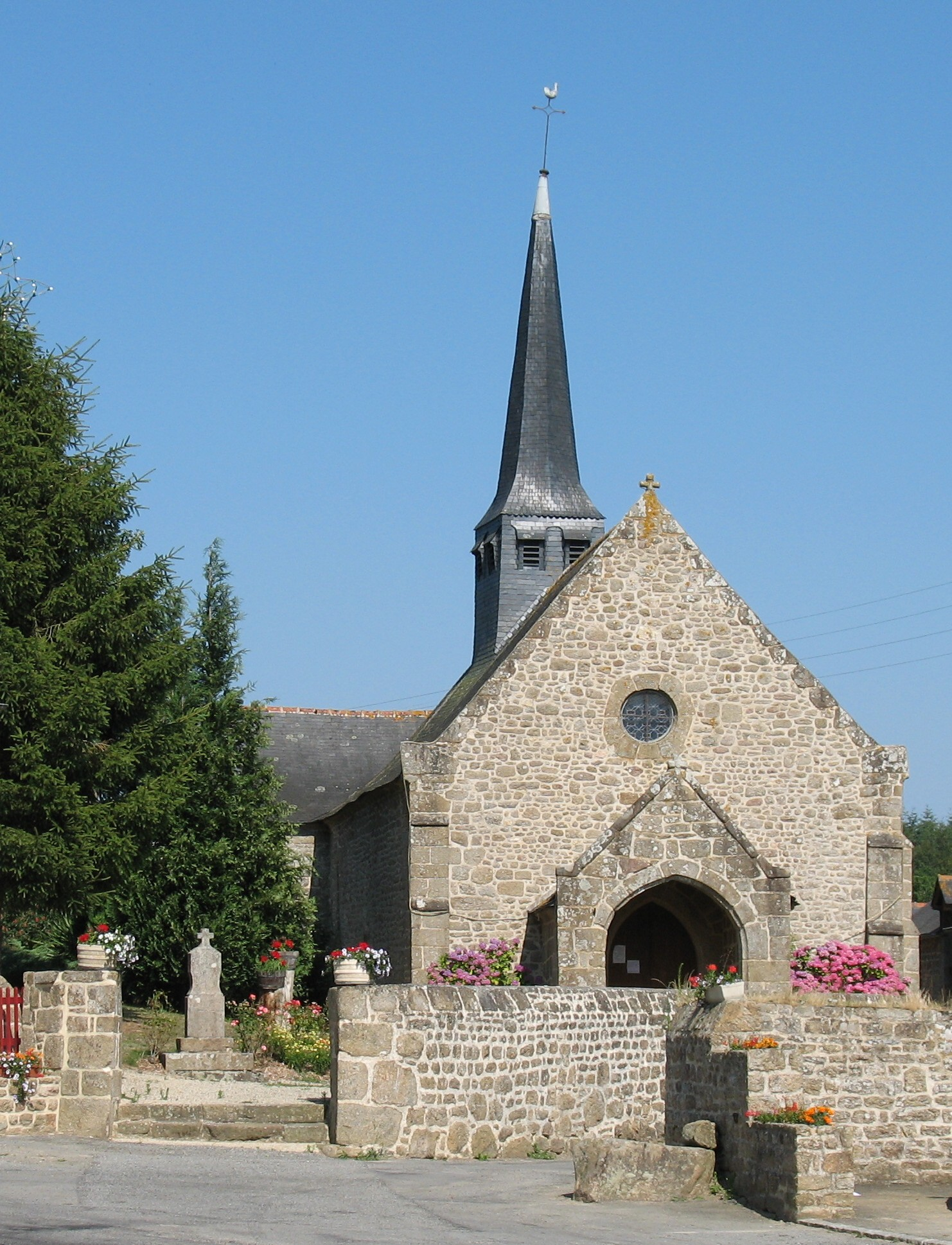
Church of Saint-Christophe-de-Valains

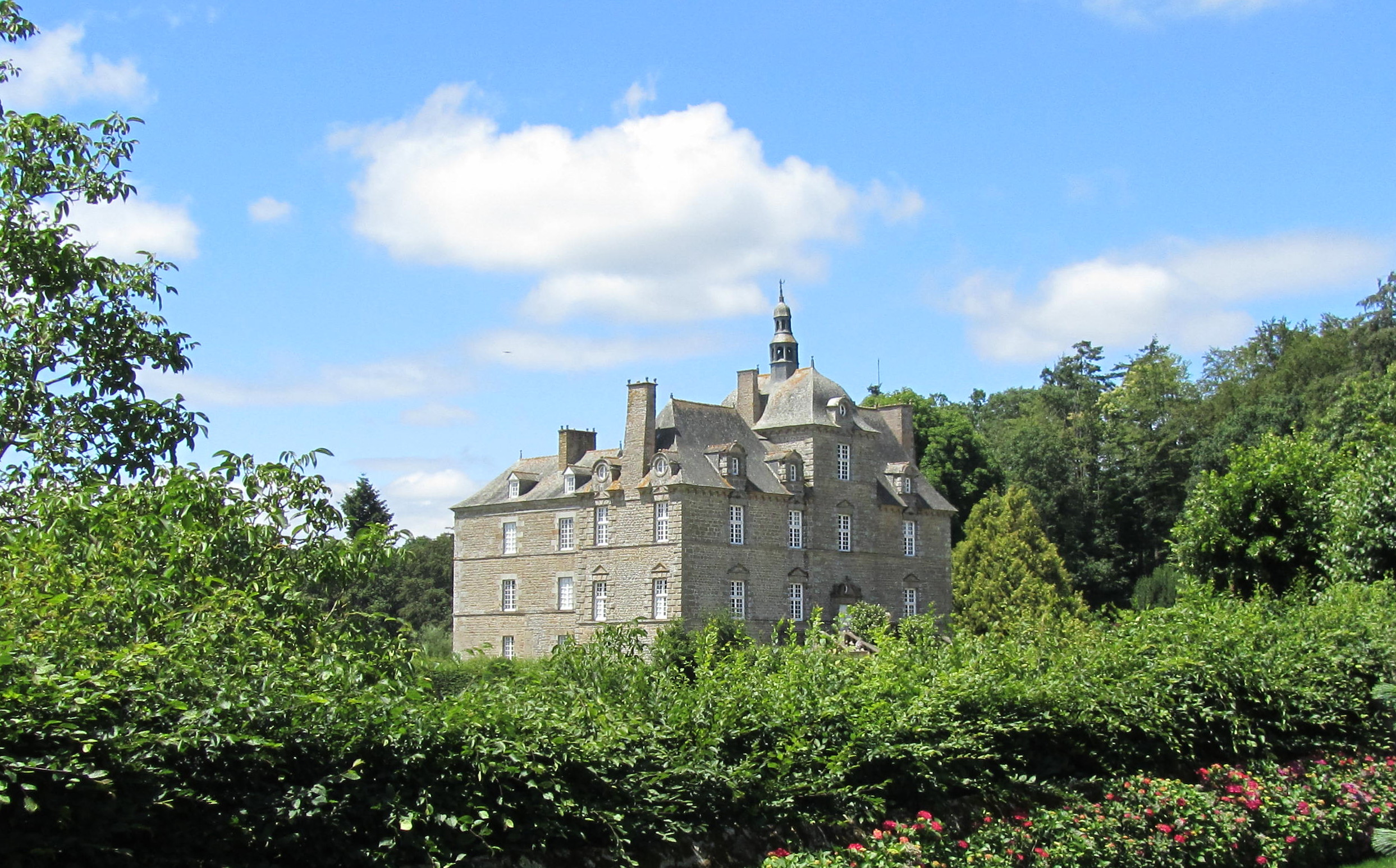
Castle of La Bélinaye 17th century.

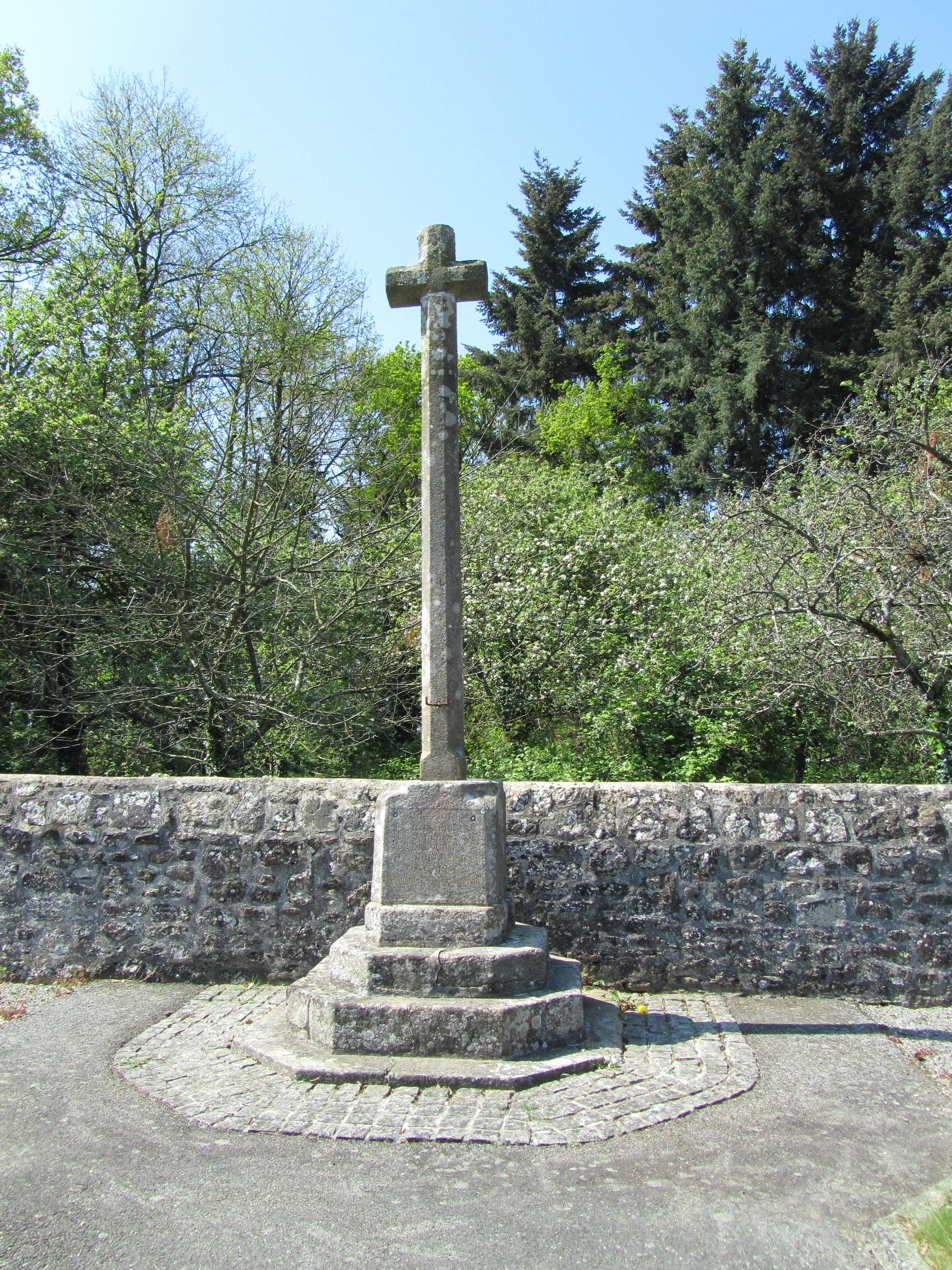
The war memorial.

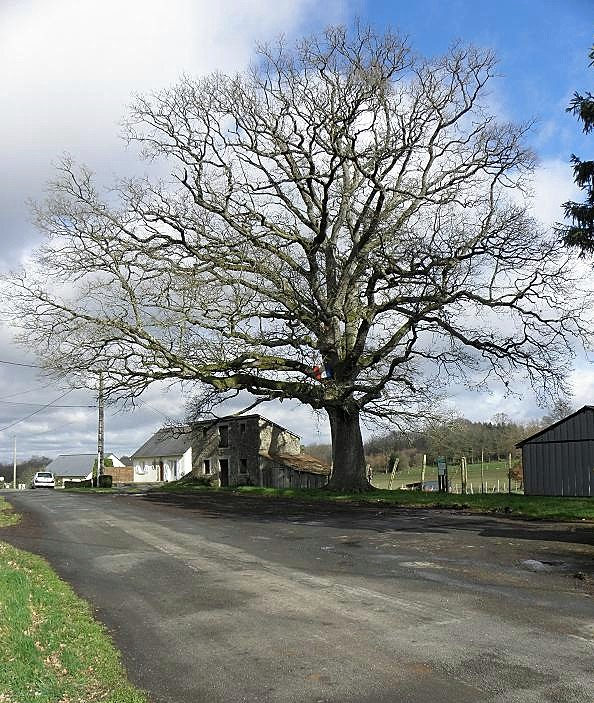
The Liberty Oak.

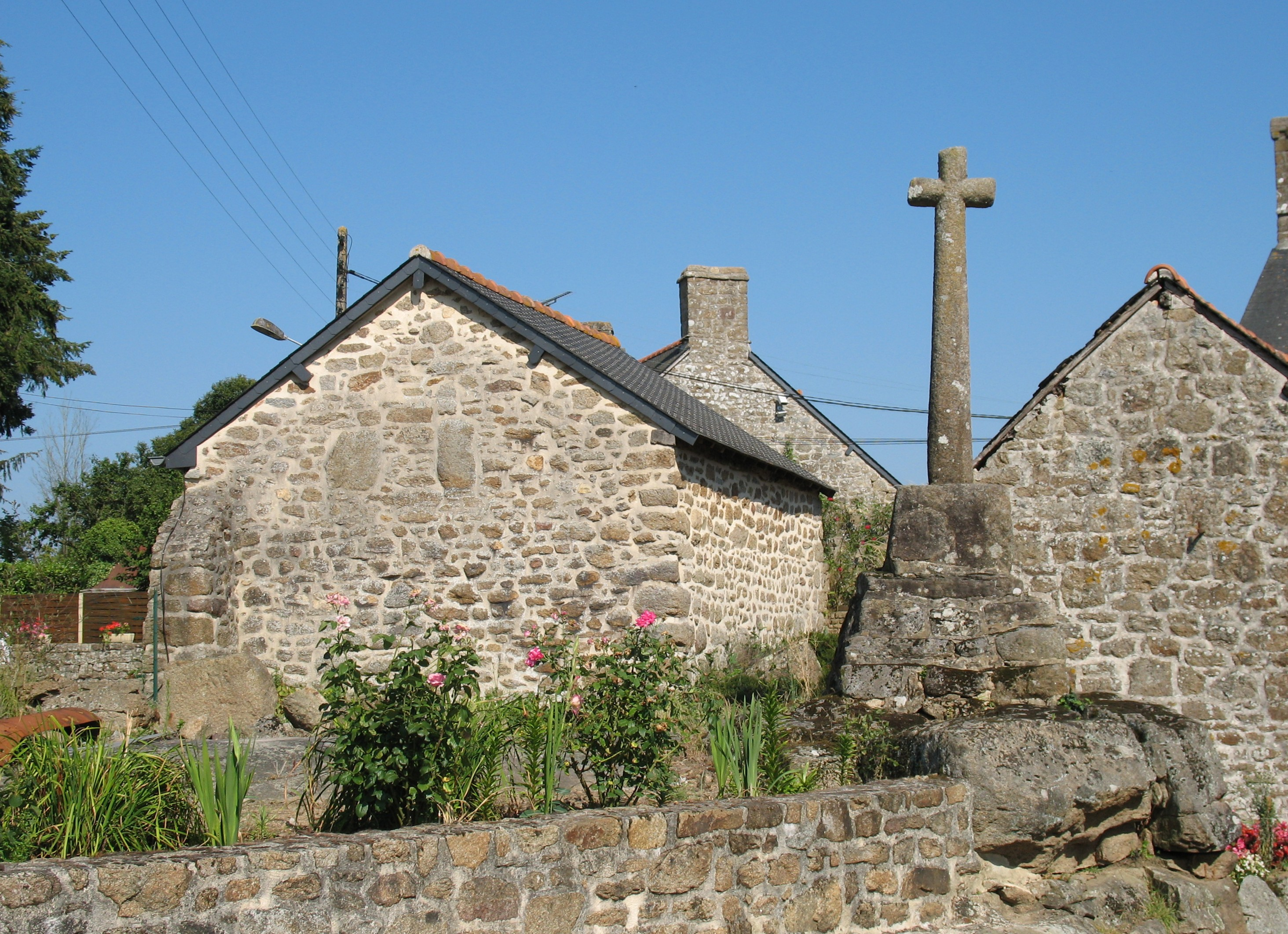
Saint-Christophe-de-Valains

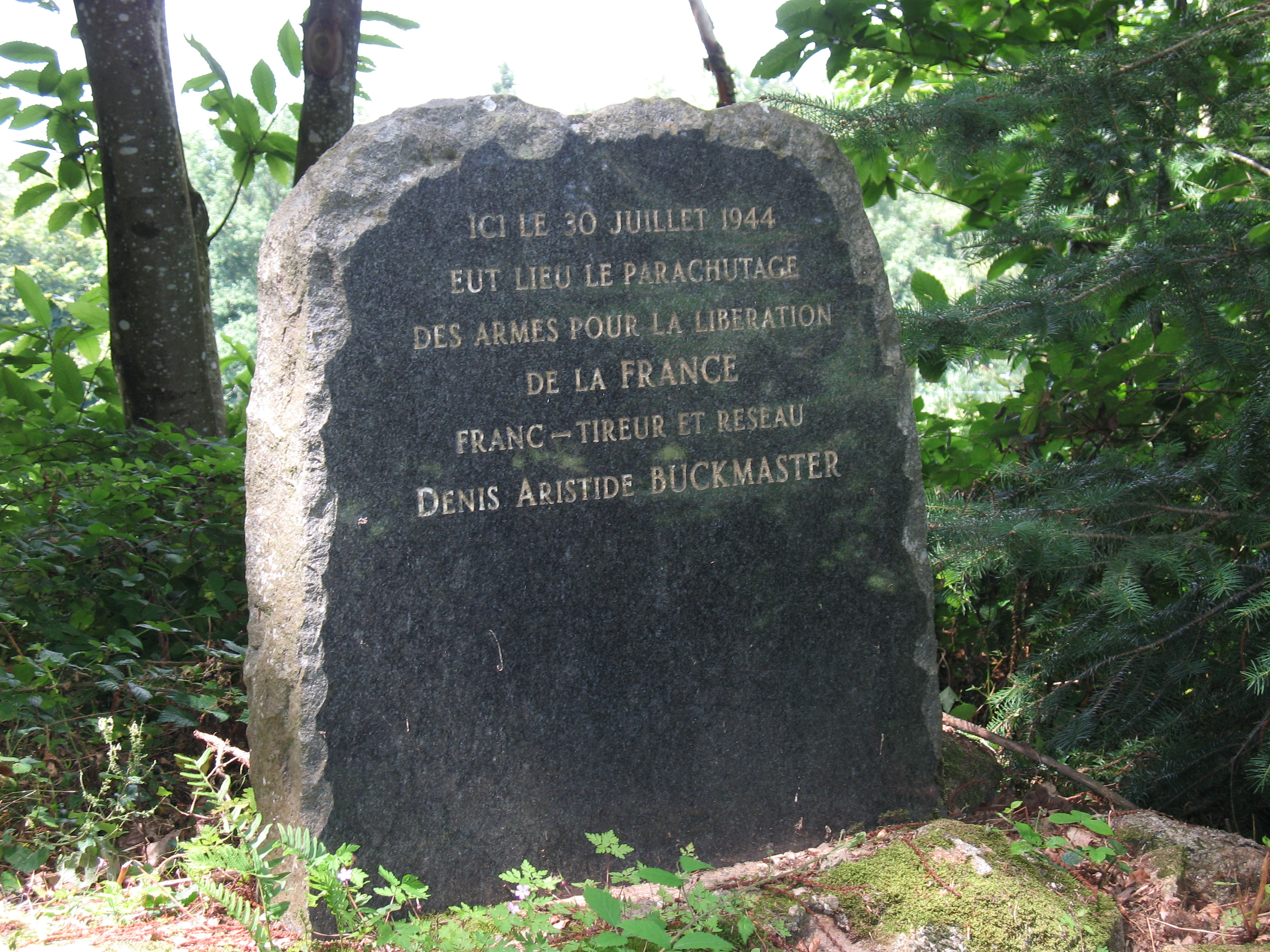
Memorial stone.

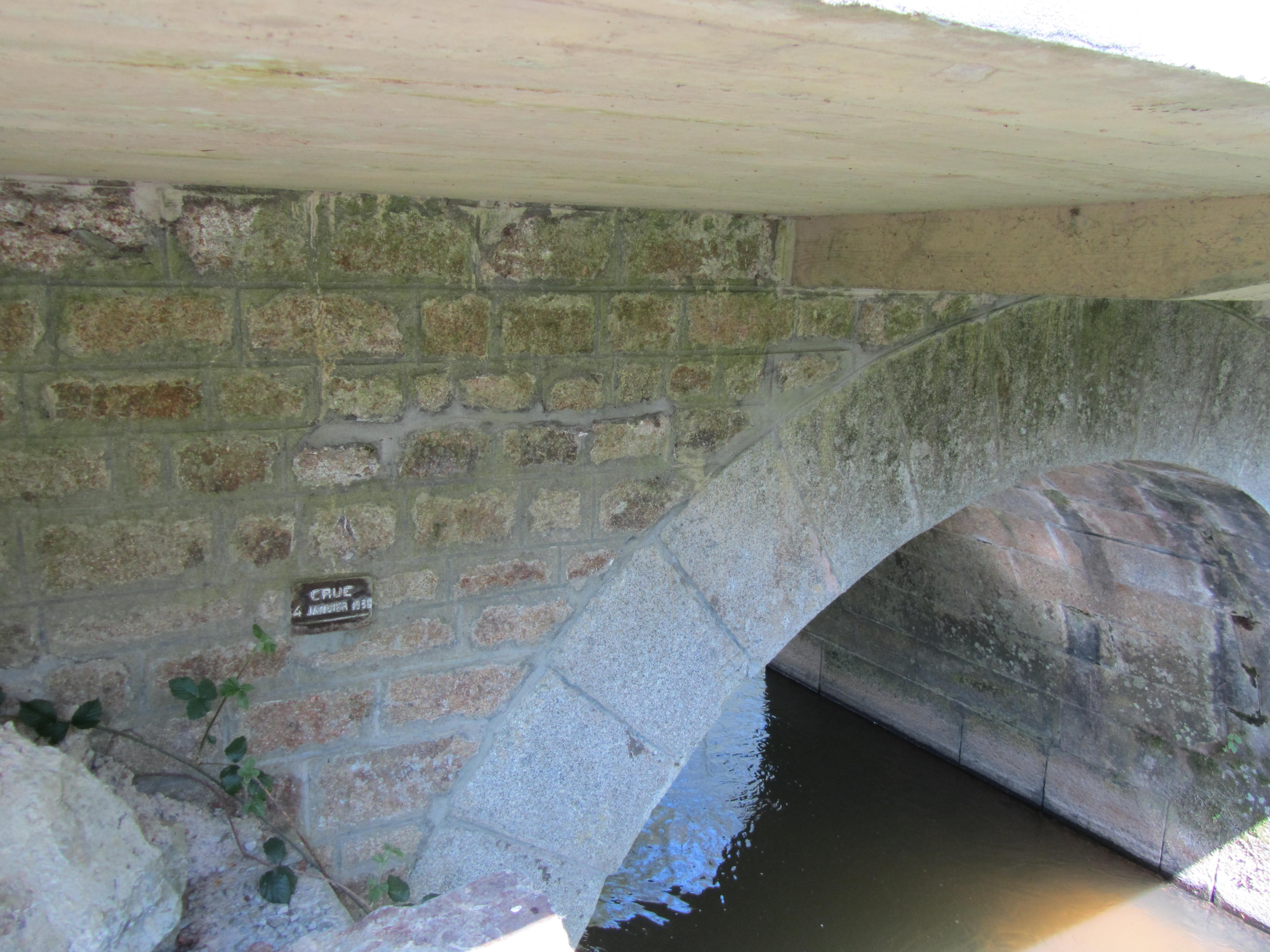
Flood of January 4, 1936.

== Events ==
Ball every 14 July under the Liberty Oak.

== See also ==
- Communes of the Ille-et-Vilaine department
