= Bazouges-la-Pérouse =

Bazouges-la-Pérouse Bazój-la-Pérózz (Gallo) Bazeleg-ar-Veineg (Breton)
- Commune
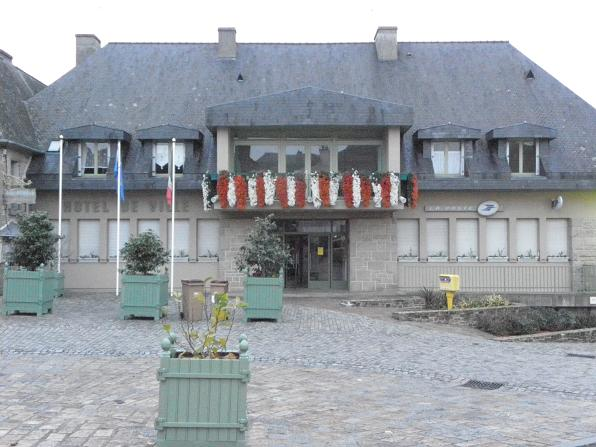
- The town hall of Bazouges la Pérouse

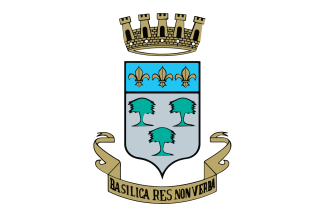
- Flag Coat of arms
- Location of Bazouges-la-Pérouse
- Location within France Location within Brittany
- Coordinates: 48°25′37″N 1°34′23″W
- Country: France
- Region: Brittany
- Department: Ille-et-Vilaine
- Arrondissement: Fougères-Vitré
- Canton: Val-Couesnon

Government
  - Mayor (2020–2026): Pascal Hervé
- Area^{1}: 58.18 km^{2} (22.46 sq mi)
- Highest elevation: 116 m (381 ft)
- Lowest elevation: 10 m (33 ft)
- Population (2023): 1,877
  - Density: 32.26/km^{2} (83.56/sq mi)
- Time zone: UTC+01:00 (CET)
  - Summer (DST): UTC+02:00 (CEST)
- INSEE/Postal code: 35019 /35560
- ^{1} French Land Register data, which excludes lakes, ponds, glaciers > 1 km^{2} (0.386 sq mi or 247 acres) and river estuaries.

Bazouges-la-Pérouse (French pronunciation: [bazuʒ la peʁuz]; Breton: Bazeleg-ar-Veineg; Gallo: Bazój-la-Pérózz) is a commune in the Ille-et-Vilaine department in Brittany in northwestern France.

== Population ==
Historical population
Year	Pop.	±% p.a.
1968	2,055	—
1975	1,999	−0.39%
1982	2,029	+0.21%
1990	1,951	−0.49%
1999	1,854	−0.57%
2007	1,853	−0.01%
2012	1,844	−0.10%
2017	1,808	−0.39%
2023	1,877	+0.63%
Source: INSEE

Inhabitants of Bazouges-la-Pérouse are called Bazougeais in French.

== Sights ==
There are three historical monuments :

The Château de la Ballue is now a hotel. A house which dates from 1604. A half-timbered house (17th century)

== See also ==
- Communes of the Ille-et-Vilaine department
