= La Selle-en-Coglès =

La Selle-en-Coglès Kell-Gougleiz
- Part of Les Portes du Coglais
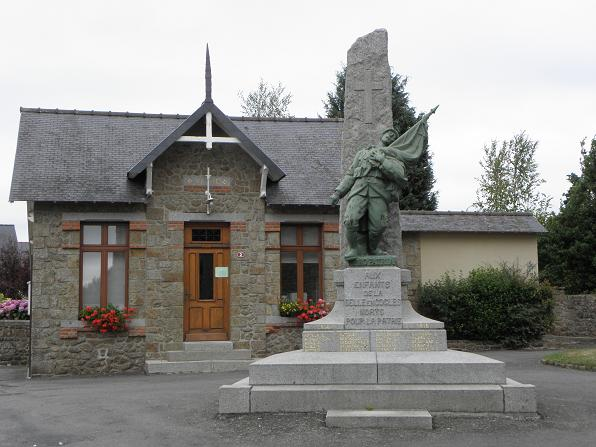
- The town hall of La Selle-en-Coglès
- Location of La Selle-en-Coglès
- Location within France Location within Brittany
- Coordinates: 48°26′18″N 1°20′36″W
- Country: France
- Region: Brittany
- Department: Ille-et-Vilaine
- Arrondissement: Fougères-Vitré
- Canton: Antrain
- Commune: Les Portes du Coglais
- Area^{1}: 8.23 km^{2} (3.18 sq mi)
- Highest elevation: 138 m (453 ft)
- Lowest elevation: 93 m (305 ft)
- Population (2023): 554
  - Density: 67.3/km^{2} (174/sq mi)
- Time zone: UTC+01:00 (CET)
  - Summer (DST): UTC+02:00 (CEST)
- Postal code: 35460
- ^{1} French Land Register data, which excludes lakes, ponds, glaciers > 1 km^{2} (0.386 sq mi or 247 acres) and river estuaries.

La Selle-en-Coglès (French pronunciation: [la sɛl ɑ̃ kɔɡl], pronounced as La Selle-en-Cogles; Breton: Kell-Gougleiz) is a former commune in the Ille-et-Vilaine department in Brittany in northwestern France. On 1 January 2017, it was merged into the new commune Les Portes du Coglais. Inhabitants of La Selle-en-Coglès are called Cellois in French.

== See also ==
- Communes of the Ille-et-Vilaine department
