= Saint-Germain-en-Coglès =

Saint-Germain-en-Coglès Sant-Jermen-Cougleiz (Breton)
- Commune
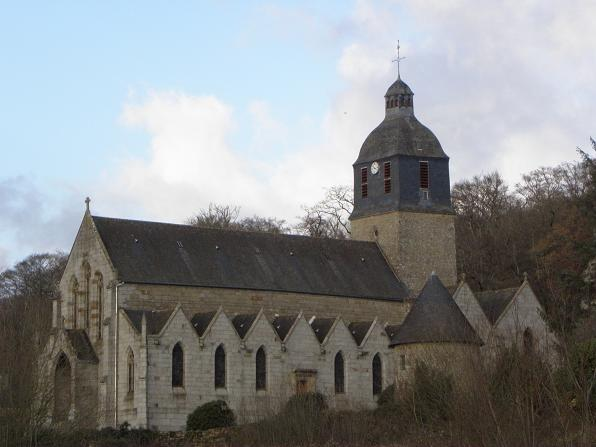
- The church of Saint-Germain-d'Auxerre, in Saint-Germain-en-Coglès
- Location of Saint-Germain-en-Coglès
- Location within France Location within Brittany
- Coordinates: 48°24′24″N 1°15′44″W
- Country: France
- Region: Brittany
- Department: Ille-et-Vilaine
- Arrondissement: Fougères-Vitré
- Canton: Val-Couesnon

Government
  - Mayor (2023–2026): Daniel Helbert
- Area^{1}: 32.09 km^{2} (12.39 sq mi)
- Highest elevation: 194 m (636 ft)
- Lowest elevation: 105 m (344 ft)
- Population (2023): 2,096
  - Density: 65.32/km^{2} (169.2/sq mi)
- Time zone: UTC+01:00 (CET)
  - Summer (DST): UTC+02:00 (CEST)
- INSEE/Postal code: 35273 /35133
- ^{1} French Land Register data, which excludes lakes, ponds, glaciers > 1 km^{2} (0.386 sq mi or 247 acres) and river estuaries.

Saint-Germain-en-Coglès (French pronunciation: [sɛ̃ ʒɛʁmɛ̃ ɑ̃ kɔɡl], pronounced as Saint-Germain-en-Cogles; Breton: Sant-Jermen-Gougleiz) is a commune in the Ille-et-Vilaine department of Brittany in northwestern France.

== Population ==
Inhabitants of Saint-Germain-en-Coglès are called germanais in French.

Historical population
Year	Pop.	±% p.a.
1968	1,911	—
1975	1,815	−0.73%
1982	1,781	−0.27%
1990	1,794	+0.09%
1999	1,773	−0.13%
2007	1,986	+1.43%
2012	2,033	+0.47%
2017	2,051	+0.18%
2023	2,096	+0.36%
Source: INSEE

== History ==
The parish is named after Germanus of Auxerre in the fifth century. In the twelfth century, it belonged to the abbey of Saint-Florent de Saumur before being united to the diocese of Rennes XIV. The present church retains some elements of Romanesque tombstones of the previous building. Bertrand Saulnier (twelfth century), Pierre Loupvelaye (1550), Isaac Lachesnais (1590), Leonard Tréhu (1613), Valentin Chevetel (1706) and Pierre Pougeolle (1779) were rectors of the parish.

== See also ==
- Communes of the Ille-et-Vilaine department
