= Botanical garden of Upper Brittany =

Private estate in Brittany, France

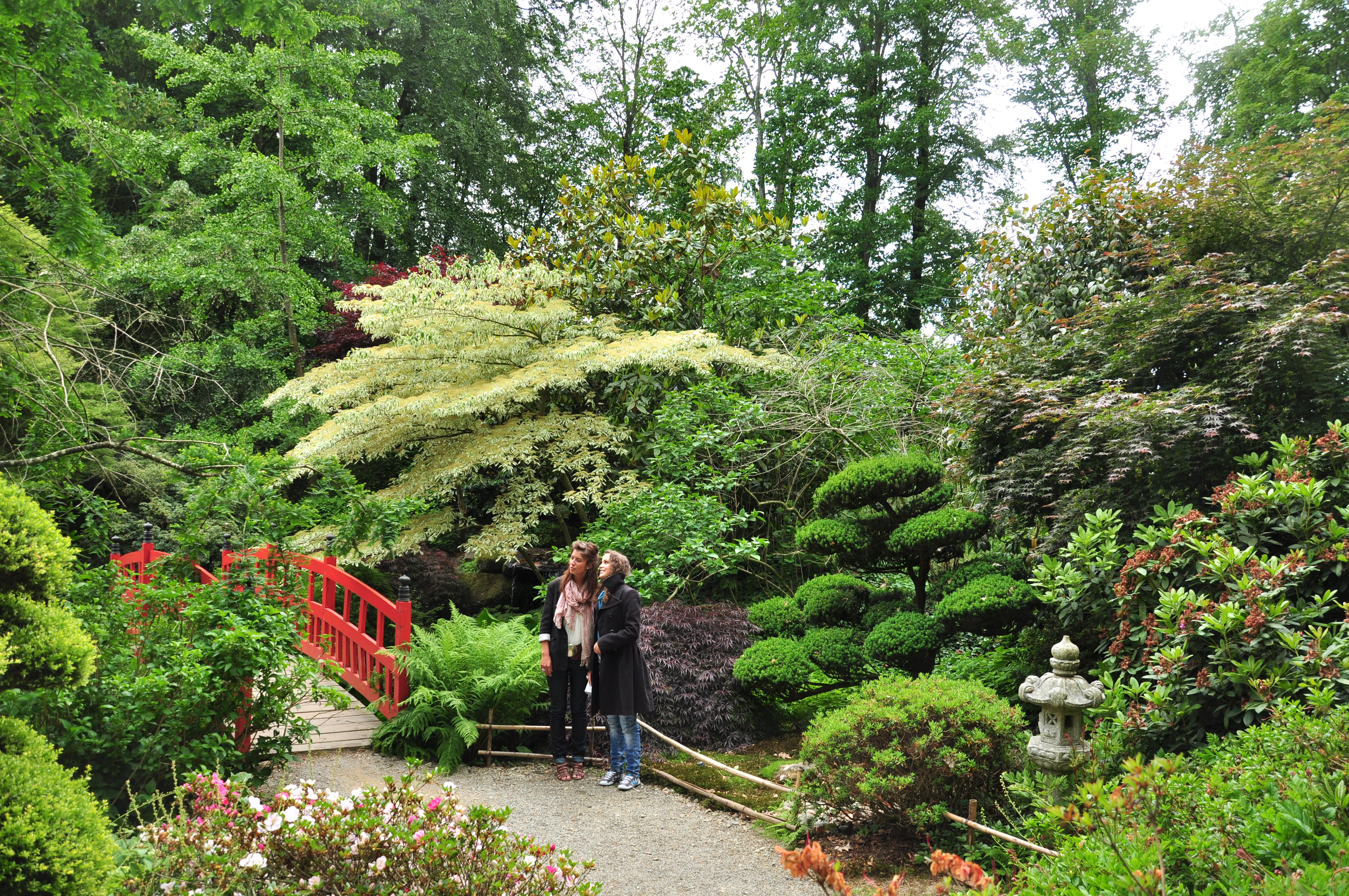
- Interactive map of Botanical garden of Upper Brittany
- Type: botanical garden, English landscape garden, French formal garden, Japanese garden.
- Location: Upper Brittany, France
- Coordinates: 48°25′47″N 1°15′39″W
- Area: 25 hectares (62 acres)

The Botanical garden of Upper Brittany (French: Jardin botanique de Haute-Bretagne; Breton: Liorzh louzawouriezh Breizh-Uhel) is a private estate with an area of 25 hectares (62 acres), located in the Ille-et-Vilaine department of Brittany, near the medieval city of Fougères. The park is part of the estate of La Foltière, where stands the Château de la Foltière built in 1847.

== Location ==
The Botanical garden of Upper Brittany is located on the village of Le Châtellier (Ille-et-Vilaine), approximately 10 kilometres (6.2 mi) from the city of Fougères, between Rennes and the Mont Saint-Michel, near the A84 motorway.

== History ==
Foltiere is the name of the estate, which means "ground where beech trees grow", with the word fou being ancient French for "beech tree". The park was created in 1847, around the Château de la Foltière. In 1796, the old manor house was the headquarters of an uprising against the government of the French Republic led by Count Joseph de Puisaye. In 1820, the Estate of La Foltière was bought by the family Frontin des Buffards. In 1847, the land surrounding the pond in the park was redesigned as an English romantic landscape garden. It featured paths that follow the terrain, and a view of the lawn in front of the house and the church tower in the village.

== Quality label ==
The French Ministry of Culture classified the Parc botanique de Haute-Bretagne as a Jardin remarquable, notable gardens of France. The French Ministry of Tourism awarded the botanical garden the label Qualité Tourisme in 2011.
