= Sens-de-Bretagne =

Sens-de-Bretagne Senn (Gallo) Sen (Breton)
- Commune
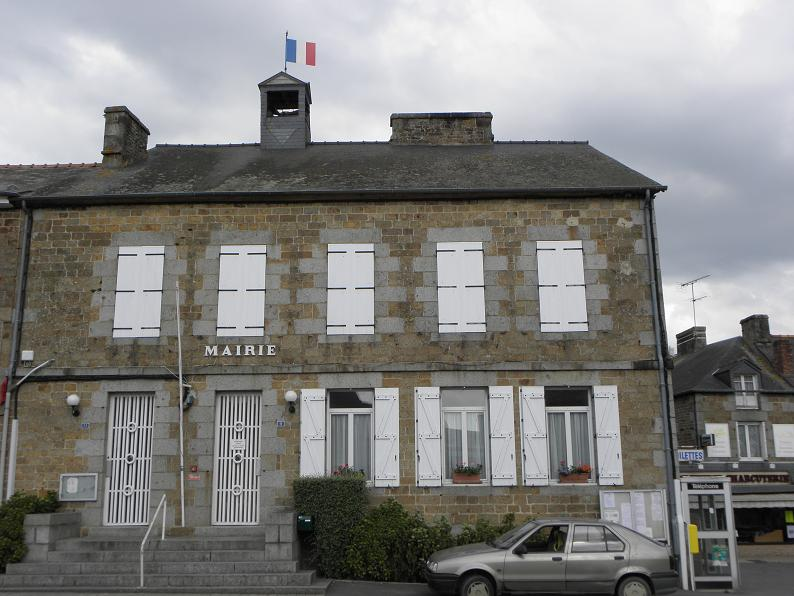
- The town hall of Sens-de-Bretagne

- Coat of arms
- Location of Sens-de-Bretagne
- Location within France Location within Brittany
- Coordinates: 48°20′03″N 1°32′06″W
- Country: France
- Region: Brittany
- Department: Ille-et-Vilaine
- Arrondissement: Rennes
- Canton: Val-Couesnon
- Intercommunality: Val d'Ille-Aubigné

Government
  - Mayor (2021–2026): Gérard Morel
- Area^{1}: 30.82 km^{2} (11.90 sq mi)
- Highest elevation: 107 m (351 ft)
- Lowest elevation: 16 m (52 ft)
- Population (2023): 2,592
  - Density: 84.10/km^{2} (217.8/sq mi)
- Time zone: UTC+01:00 (CET)
  - Summer (DST): UTC+02:00 (CEST)
- INSEE/Postal code: 35326 /35490
- ^{1} French Land Register data, which excludes lakes, ponds, glaciers > 1 km^{2} (0.386 sq mi or 247 acres) and river estuaries.

Sens-de-Bretagne (French pronunciation: [sɑ̃s də bʁətaɲ]; Breton: Sen) is a commune in the Ille-et-Vilaine department in Brittany in northwestern France.

== Population ==
Inhabitants of Sens-de-Bretagne are called Senonais in French.

Historical population
Year	Pop.	±% p.a.
1968	1,409	—
1975	1,426	+0.17%
1982	1,374	−0.53%
1990	1,393	+0.17%
1999	1,515	+0.94%
2007	2,125	+4.32%
2012	2,582	+3.97%
2017	2,554	−0.22%
2023	2,592	+0.25%
Source: INSEE

== See also ==
- Communes of the Ille-et-Vilaine department
