= Gahard =

Gahard Gahard (Gallo) Gwaharzh (Breton)
- Commune
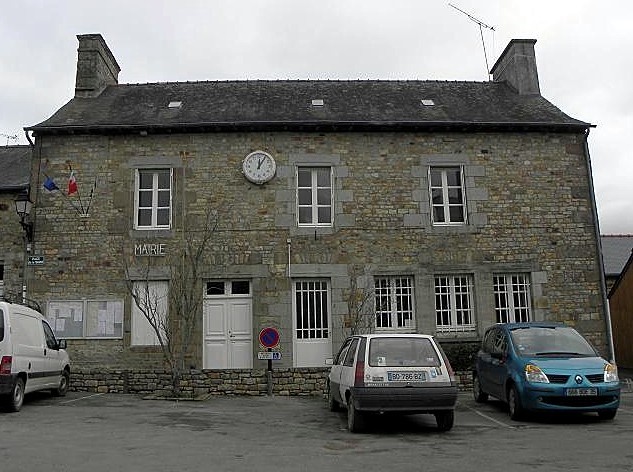
- Town hall

- Coat of arms
- Location of Gahard
- Location within France Location within Brittany
- Coordinates: 48°17′51″N 1°31′05″W
- Country: France
- Region: Brittany
- Department: Ille-et-Vilaine
- Arrondissement: Rennes
- Canton: Val-Couesnon

Government
  - Mayor (2020–2026): Isabelle Lavastre
- Area^{1}: 24.96 km^{2} (9.64 sq mi)
- Highest elevation: 112 m (367 ft)
- Lowest elevation: 45 m (148 ft)
- Population (2023): 1,523
  - Density: 61.02/km^{2} (158.0/sq mi)
- Time zone: UTC+01:00 (CET)
  - Summer (DST): UTC+02:00 (CEST)
- INSEE/Postal code: 35118 /35490
- ^{1} French Land Register data, which excludes lakes, ponds, glaciers > 1 km^{2} (0.386 sq mi or 247 acres) and river estuaries.

Gahard (French pronunciation: [ɡa.aʁ]; Breton: Gwaharzh; Gallo: Gahard) is a commune in the Ille-et-Vilaine department in Brittany in northwestern France.

== Population ==
Inhabitants of Gahard are called Gahardais in French.

Historical population
Year	Pop.	±% p.a.
1968	865	—
1975	792	−1.25%
1982	813	+0.37%
1990	890	+1.14%
1999	920	+0.37%
2007	1,148	+2.81%
2012	1,347	+3.25%
2017	1,467	+1.72%
2023	1,523	+0.63%
Source: INSEE

== See also ==
- Communes of the Ille-et-Vilaine department
