= Saint-Marc-le-Blanc =

Saint-Marc-le-Blanc Saent-Mard-le-Blaunc (Gallo) Sant-Mezar-Elvinieg (Breton)
- Commune
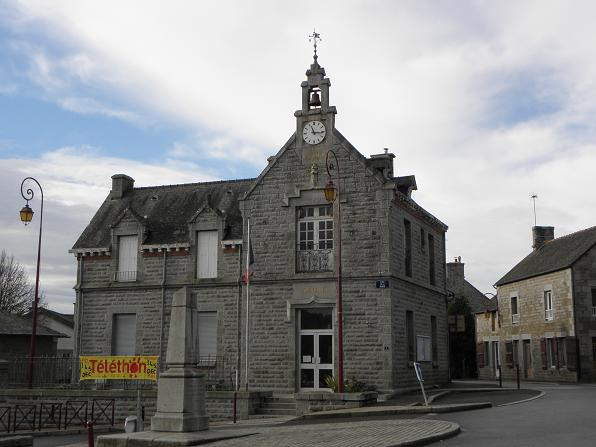
- The town hall of Saint-Marc-le-Blanc
- Location of Saint-Marc-le-Blanc
- Location within France Location within Brittany
- Coordinates: 48°21′55″N 1°24′30″W
- Country: France
- Region: Brittany
- Department: Ille-et-Vilaine
- Arrondissement: Fougères-Vitré
- Canton: Val-Couesnon
- Intercommunality: Couesnon Marches de Bretagne

Government
  - Mayor (2020–2026): Olivier Gaigne
- Area^{1}: 22.76 km^{2} (8.79 sq mi)
- Highest elevation: 121 m (397 ft)
- Lowest elevation: 60 m (200 ft)
- Population (2023): 1,553
  - Density: 68.23/km^{2} (176.7/sq mi)
- Time zone: UTC+01:00 (CET)
  - Summer (DST): UTC+02:00 (CEST)
- INSEE/Postal code: 35292 /35460
- ^{1} French Land Register data, which excludes lakes, ponds, glaciers > 1 km^{2} (0.386 sq mi or 247 acres) and river estuaries.

Saint-Marc-le-Blanc (French pronunciation: [sɛ̃ maʁ lə blɑ̃]; Gallo: Saent-Mard-le-Blaunc, Breton: Sant-Mezar-Elvinieg) is a commune in the Ille-et-Vilaine department in Brittany in northwestern France. On 1 January 2019, the former commune Baillé was merged into Saint-Marc-le-Blanc.

== Geography ==
Saint-Marc-le-Blanc is located 39 km (24 mi) northeast of Rennes and 33 km (21 mi) south of Mont Saint-Michel.

The adjacent communes are Saint-Brice-en-Coglès, Baillé, Le Tiercent, Chauvigné, and Tremblay.

== Population ==
Inhabitants of Saint-Marc-le-Blanc are called marcblaisiens in French.

Historical population
Year	Pop.	±% p.a.
1968	1,496	—
1975	1,382	−1.13%
1982	1,400	+0.19%
1990	1,393	−0.06%
1999	1,401	+0.06%
2007	1,528	+1.09%
2012	1,611	+1.06%
2017	1,689	+0.95%
2023	1,553	−1.39%
Source: Population in geography as of January 2025, INSEE

== See also ==
- Communes of the Ille-et-Vilaine department
