= Coglès =

Coglès Gougleiz
- Part of Les Portes du Coglais
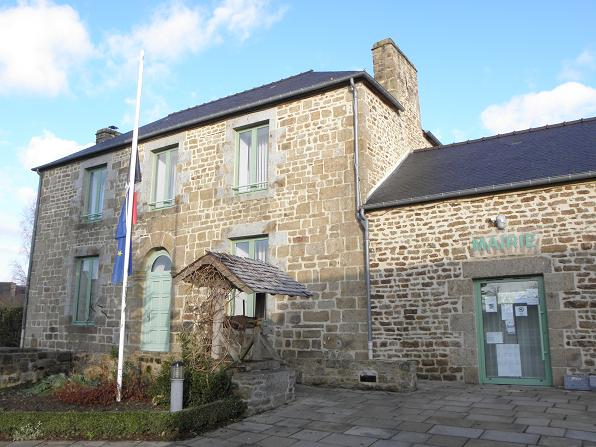
- Town hall

- Coat of arms
- Location of Coglès
- Location within France Location within Brittany
- Coordinates: 48°27′38″N 1°21′45″W
- Country: France
- Region: Brittany
- Department: Ille-et-Vilaine
- Arrondissement: Fougères-Vitré
- Canton: Antrain
- Commune: Les Portes du Coglais
- Area^{1}: 17.21 km^{2} (6.64 sq mi)
- Highest elevation: 142 m (466 ft)
- Lowest elevation: 70 m (230 ft)
- Population (2022): 629
  - Density: 36.5/km^{2} (94.7/sq mi)
- Time zone: UTC+01:00 (CET)
  - Summer (DST): UTC+02:00 (CEST)
- Postal code: 35460
- ^{1} French Land Register data, which excludes lakes, ponds, glaciers > 1 km^{2} (0.386 sq mi or 247 acres) and river estuaries.

Coglès (French pronunciation: [kɔɡl], pronounced as Cogles; Breton: Gougleiz, north) is a former commune in the Ille-et-Vilaine department of Brittany in northwestern France. On 1 January 2017, it was merged into the new commune Les Portes du Coglais.

== Population ==
Historical population

Year	Pop.	±% p.a.
1793	1,569	—
1821	1,415	−0.37%
1846	1,286	−0.38%
1872	1,250	−0.11%
1901	983	−0.83%
1926	914	−0.29%
1946	870	−0.25%
1962	856	−0.10%

Year	Pop.	±% p.a.
1968	795	−1.22%
1975	730	−1.21%
1982	652	−1.60%
1990	609	−0.85%
1999	566	−0.81%
2006	604	+0.93%
2022	629	+0.25%

Source: EHESS and INSEE

== See also ==
- Communes of the Ille-et-Vilaine department
