= Romazy =

Romazy Rovazil (Breton)
- Commune
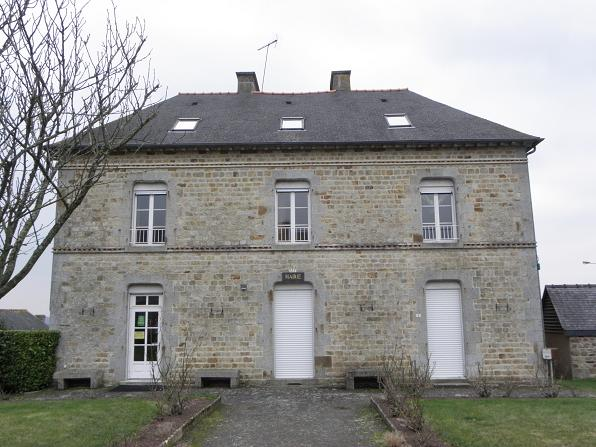
- The town hall in Romazy
- Location of Romazy
- Location within France Location within Brittany
- Coordinates: 48°22′34″N 1°29′45″W
- Country: France
- Region: Brittany
- Department: Ille-et-Vilaine
- Arrondissement: Fougères-Vitré
- Canton: Val-Couesnon
- Intercommunality: Couesnon Marches de Bretagne

Government
  - Mayor (2020–2026): Patrick Besnard
- Area^{1}: 7.18 km^{2} (2.77 sq mi)
- Highest elevation: 85 m (279 ft)
- Lowest elevation: 14 m (46 ft)
- Population (2023): 277
  - Density: 38.6/km^{2} (99.9/sq mi)
- Time zone: UTC+01:00 (CET)
  - Summer (DST): UTC+02:00 (CEST)
- INSEE/Postal code: 35244 /35490
- ^{1} French Land Register data, which excludes lakes, ponds, glaciers > 1 km^{2} (0.386 sq mi or 247 acres) and river estuaries.

Romazy (French pronunciation: [ʁɔmazi]; Breton: Rovazil) is a commune in the Ille-et-Vilaine department in Brittany in northwestern France.

== Populations ==
Inhabitants of Romazy are called romaziens in French.

Historical population
Year	Pop.	±% p.a.
1968	294	—
1975	238	−2.97%
1982	239	+0.06%
1990	263	+1.20%
1999	237	−1.15%
2007	270	+1.64%
2012	292	+1.58%
2017	254	−2.75%
2023	277	+1.46%
Source: INSEE

== See also ==
- Communes of the Ille-et-Vilaine department
