= Saint-Étienne-en-Coglès =

Saint-Étienne-en-Coglès Sant-Stefan-Gougleiz
- Part of Maen Roch
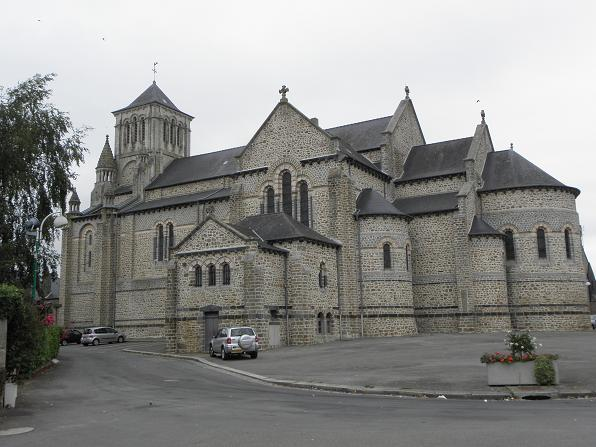
- The church of Saint-Étienne
- Location of Saint-Étienne-en-Coglès
- Location within France Location within Brittany
- Coordinates: 48°24′15″N 1°19′24″W
- Country: France
- Region: Brittany
- Department: Ille-et-Vilaine
- Arrondissement: Fougères-Vitré
- Canton: Antrain
- Commune: Maen Roch
- Area^{1}: 22.65 km^{2} (8.75 sq mi)
- Highest elevation: 155 m (509 ft)
- Lowest elevation: 73 m (240 ft)
- Population (2022): 1,983
  - Density: 87.55/km^{2} (226.8/sq mi)
- Time zone: UTC+01:00 (CET)
  - Summer (DST): UTC+02:00 (CEST)
- Postal code: 35460
- ^{1} French Land Register data, which excludes lakes, ponds, glaciers > 1 km^{2} (0.386 sq mi or 247 acres) and river estuaries.

Saint-Étienne-en-Coglès (French pronunciation: [sɛ̃.t‿etjɛn ɑ̃ kɔɡl], pronounced as Saint-Étienne-en-Cogles; Breton: Sant-Stefan-Gougleiz) is a former commune in the Ille-et-Vilaine department of Brittany in northwestern France. On 1 January 2017, it was merged into the new commune Maen Roch.

== Population ==
Inhabitants of Saint-Étienne-en-Coglès are called stéphanais in French.

Historical population
Year	Pop.	±% p.a.
1962	1,448	—
1968	1,430	−0.21%
1975	1,339	−0.93%
1982	1,422	+0.86%
1990	1,461	+0.34%
1999	1,430	−0.24%
2022	1,983	+1.43%
Source: EHESS and INSEE

== See also ==
- Communes of the Ille-et-Vilaine department
