= Baillé =

Baillé Balieg
- Part of Saint-Marc-le-Blanc
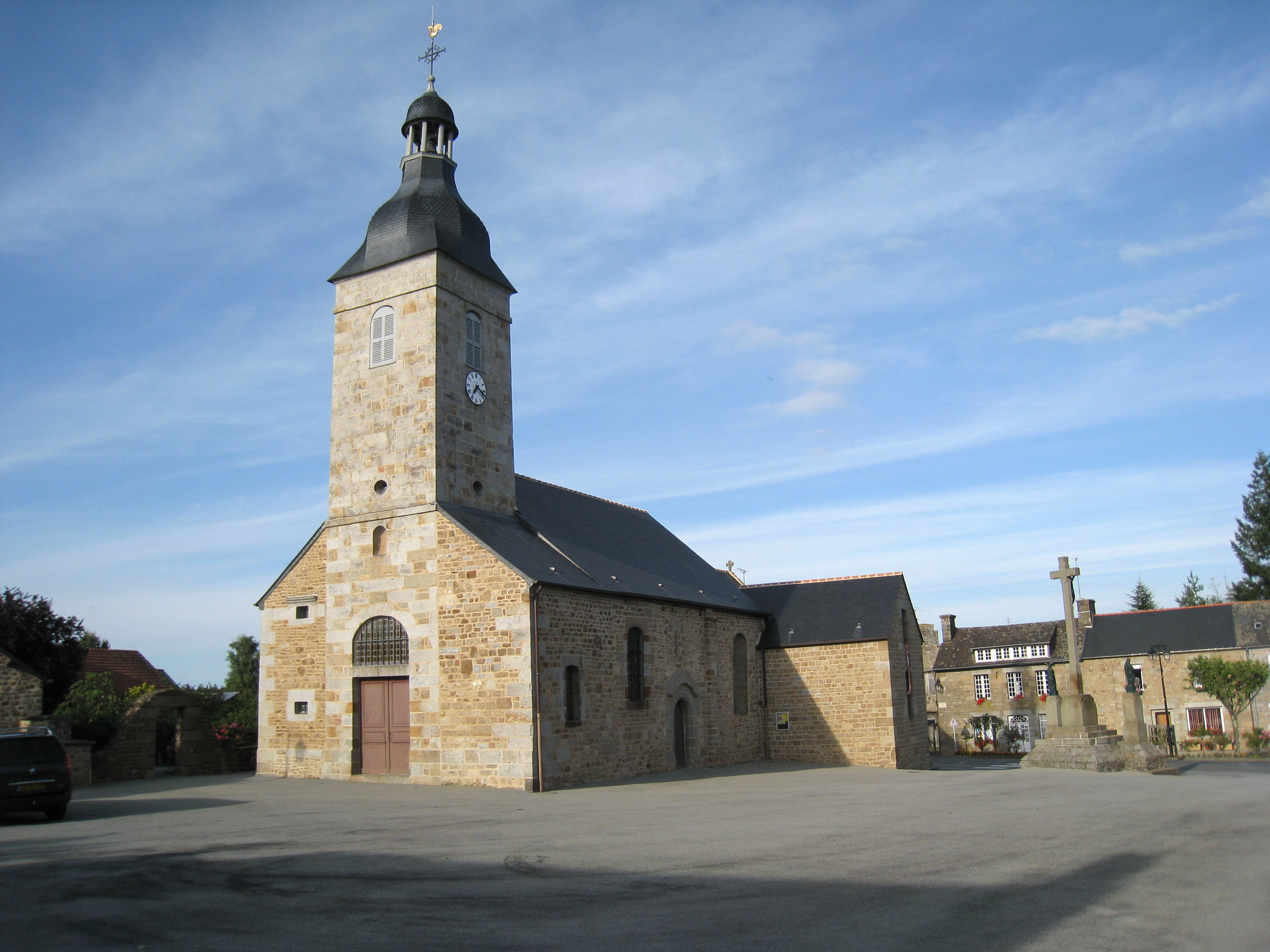
- The church of Baillé
- Location of Baillé
- Location within France Location within Brittany
- Coordinates: 48°21′37″N 1°22′50″W
- Country: France
- Region: Brittany
- Department: Ille-et-Vilaine
- Arrondissement: Fougères-Vitré
- Canton: Antrain
- Commune: Saint-Marc-le-Blanc
- Area^{1}: 5.23 km^{2} (2.02 sq mi)
- Highest elevation: 111 m (364 ft)
- Lowest elevation: 60 m (200 ft)
- Population (2023): 265
  - Density: 50.7/km^{2} (131/sq mi)
- Time zone: UTC+01:00 (CET)
  - Summer (DST): UTC+02:00 (CEST)
- Postal code: 35460
- ^{1} French Land Register data, which excludes lakes, ponds, glaciers > 1 km^{2} (0.386 sq mi or 247 acres) and river estuaries.

Baillé (French pronunciation: [baje]; Breton: Balieg; Gallo: Balhae) is a former commune in the Ille-et-Vilaine department in Brittany in northwestern France. On 1 January 2019, it was merged into the commune Saint-Marc-le-Blanc. Inhabitants of Baillé are called Baillochins in French.

== See also ==
- Communes of the Ille-et-Vilaine department
