= Canton of Val-Couesnon =

Coordinates: 48°25′10″N 1°31′27″W

Val-Couesnon
- Canton
- Interactive map of Val-Couesnon
- Country: France
- Region: Brittany
- Department: Ille-et-Vilaine
- No. of communes: {{{nbcomm}}}

Government
  - Representatives (2021–2028): Aymar de Gouvion Saint Cyr; Aline Guiblin
- Area: 557.10 km^{2} (215.10 sq mi)
- Population (2023): 38,344
  - Density: 68.828/km^{2} (178.26/sq mi)
- INSEE code: 35 01

The Canton of Val-Couesnon (before March 2020: canton of Antrain) is a canton of France, in the Ille-et-Vilaine département, located in the northeast of the department.

At the French canton reorganisation which came into effect in March 2015, the canton was expanded from 10 to 31 communes (11 of which merged into the new communes Maen Roch, Les Portes du Coglais, Saint-Marc-le-Blanc and Val-Couesnon).

== Composition ==
It consists of the following communes:

- Andouillé-Neuville
- Aubigné
- Bazouges-la-Pérouse
- Le Châtellier
- Chauvigné
- Feins
- Gahard
- Maen Roch
- Marcillé-Raoul
- Montreuil-sur-Ille
- Mouazé
- Noyal-sous-Bazouges
- Les Portes du Coglais
- Rimou
- Romazy
- Saint-Aubin-d'Aubigné
- Saint-Germain-en-Coglès
- Saint-Hilaire-des-Landes
- Saint-Marc-le-Blanc
- Saint-Rémy-du-Plain
- Sens-de-Bretagne
- Le Tiercent
- Val-Couesnon
- Vieux-Vy-sur-Couesnon

== Councillors ==
Election	Councillors	Party	Occupation
2015	Aymar de Gouvion Saint Cyr	UMP	Mayor of Coglès
2015	Laëtitia Meignan	DVD	Councillor of Saint-Rémy-du-Plain

== Pictures of the canton ==
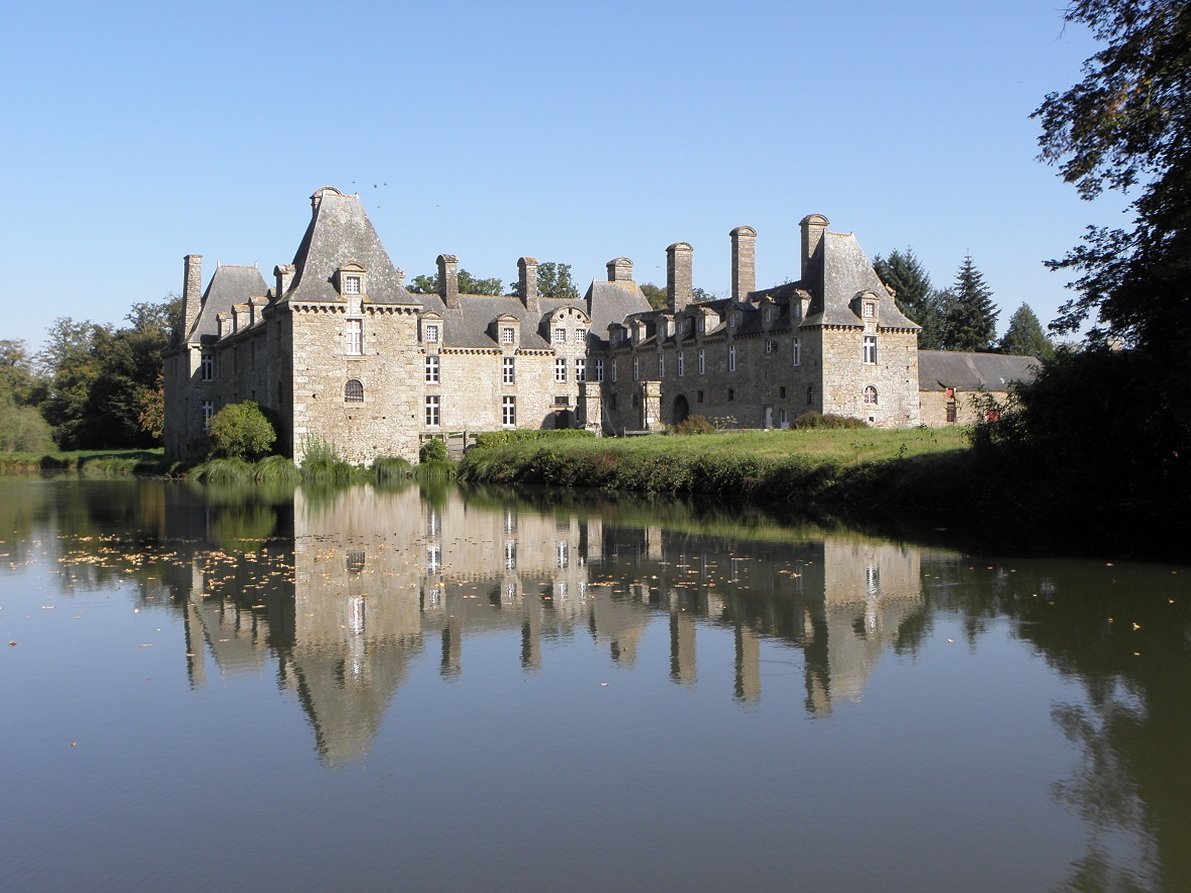
Rocher-Portail's castle in Maen Roch

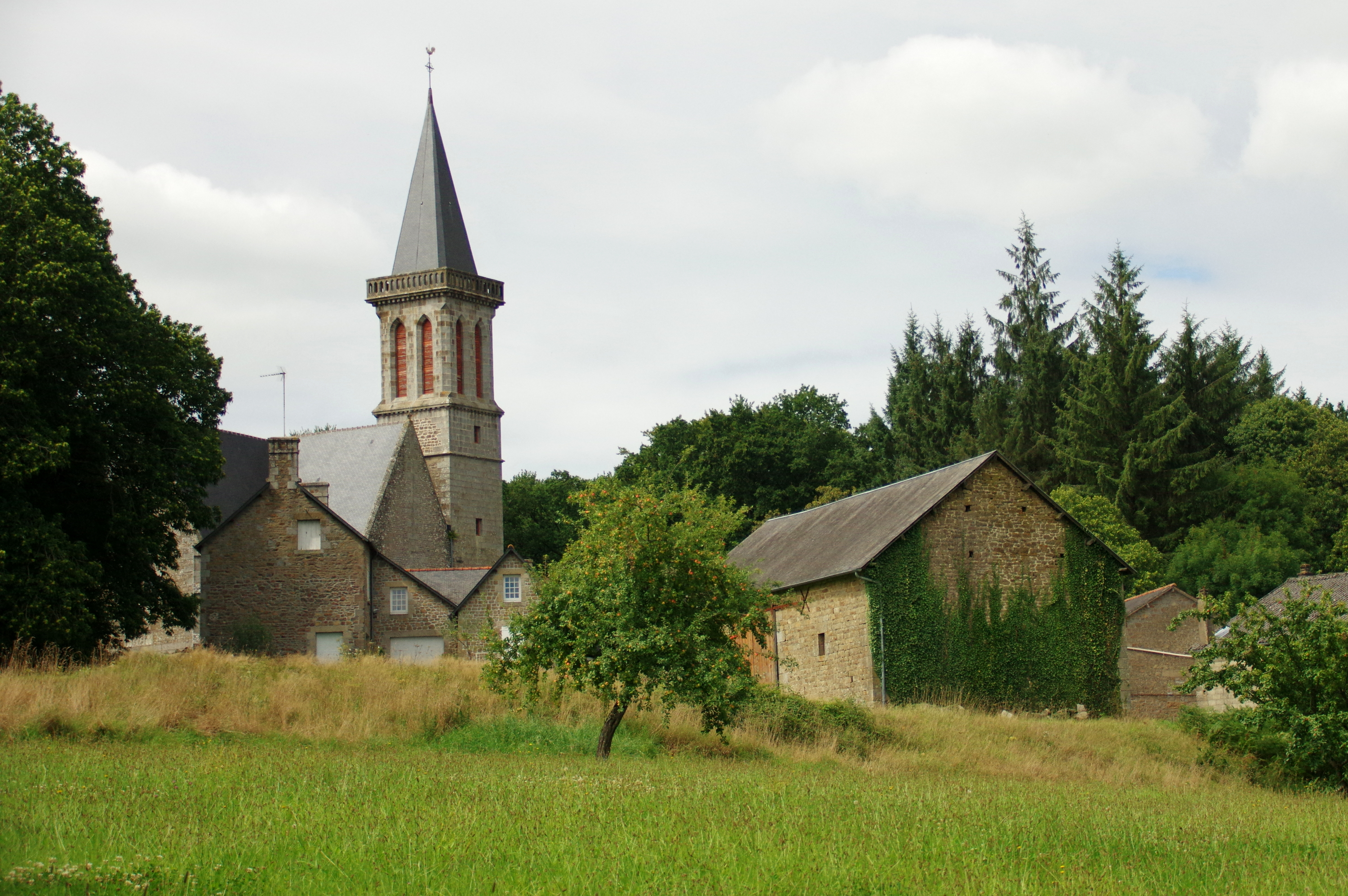
View of Le Châtellier

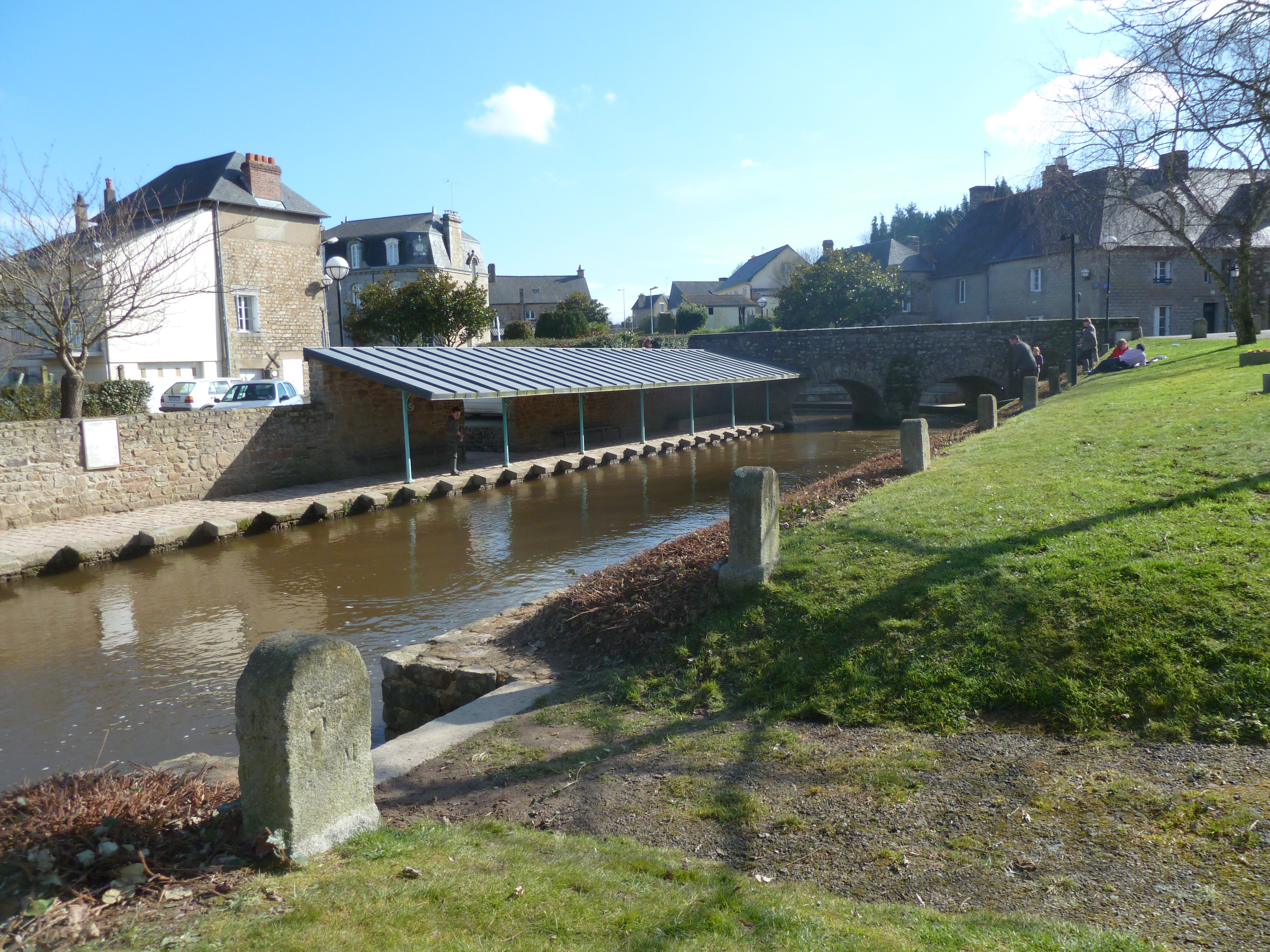
View of Val-Couesnon
