= Canton of Dinard =

Coordinates: 48°36′33″N 2°04′02″W

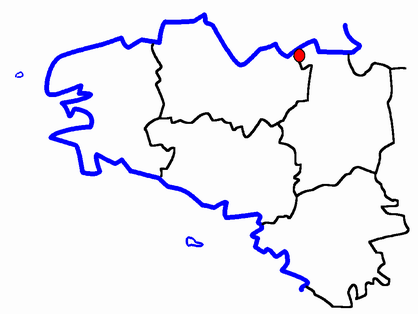

The canton of Dinard is a former canton of France, located in the arrondissement of Saint-Malo, in the Ille-et-Vilaine département, Brittany région. It had 24,417 inhabitants (2012). It was disbanded following the French canton reorganisation which came into effect in March 2015. It consisted of 6 communes, which joined the canton of Saint-Malo-2 in 2015.

== Composition ==
The canton comprised the following communes:

- Dinard
- Le Minihic-sur-Rance
- Pleurtuit
- La Richardais
- Saint-Briac-sur-Mer
- Saint-Lunaire

== Election results ==
=== 2008 ===
Cantonale Election 2008: Dinard
Party	Candidate	Votes	%	±%
PRG	Michel Penhouet	4,806	36.70	
DVD	Jean-Michel Raynard	3,182	24.30	
DVD	Gerard Legrand	2,918	22.28	
PCF	Claude Pondemer	1,585	12.10	
FN	Patrick Le Guillou	605	4.62	
Turnout		13,438	66.51	
PRG	Michel Penhouet	6,862	59.20	
DVD	Jean-Michel Raynard	4,729	40.80	
Turnout		12,129	60.03	
PRG gain from DVD		Swing		

=== 2001 ===
Party	candidate	Votes	% (first round)	Votes	% (second round)
Miscellaneous Right	Charles Thépaut	4,000	34.87%	6,337	62.50%
Miscellaneous Right	Mallet	3,322	28.96%		
PS	Lajus	2,406	20.97%	3,802	37.50%
FN	Corfmat	515	4.49%		
RPF	Mahot	451	3.93%		
PCF	Pondemer	434	3.78%		
MNR	Josseaume	343	2.99%		
