= Saint-Jouan-des-Guérets =

Saint-Jouan-des-Guérets Sant-Yowan-an-Havreg (Breton)
- Commune
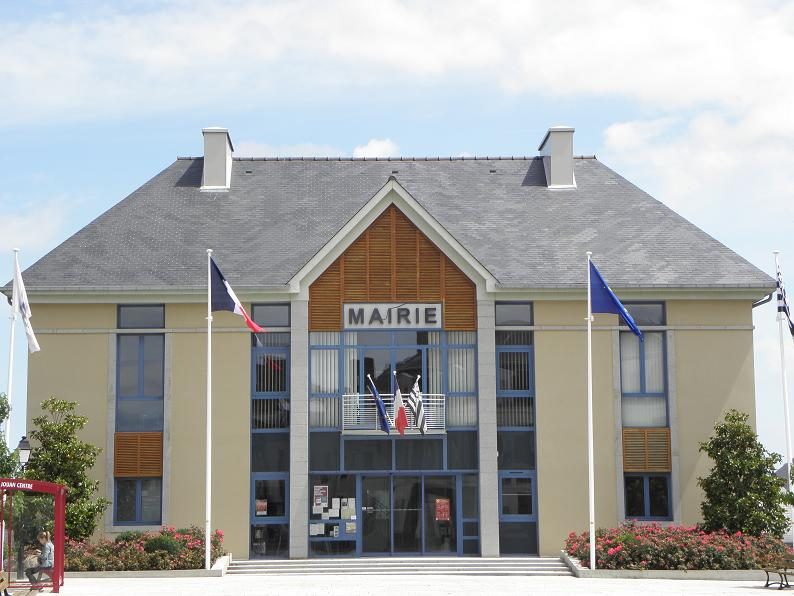
- The town hall of Saint-Jouan-des-Guérets

- Coat of arms
- Location of Saint-Jouan-des-Guérets
- Location within France Location within Brittany
- Coordinates: 48°35′57″N 1°58′19″W
- Country: France
- Region: Brittany
- Department: Ille-et-Vilaine
- Arrondissement: Saint-Malo
- Canton: Saint-Malo-2
- Intercommunality: CA Pays de Saint-Malo

Government
  - Mayor (2020–2026): Marie-France Ferret
- Area^{1}: 9.24 km^{2} (3.57 sq mi)
- Highest elevation: 61 m (200 ft)
- Lowest elevation: 0 m (0 ft)
- Population (2023): 2,847
  - Density: 308/km^{2} (798/sq mi)
- Time zone: UTC+01:00 (CET)
  - Summer (DST): UTC+02:00 (CEST)
- INSEE/Postal code: 35284 /35430
- ^{1} French Land Register data, which excludes lakes, ponds, glaciers > 1 km^{2} (0.386 sq mi or 247 acres) and river estuaries.

Saint-Jouan-des-Guérets (French pronunciation: [sɛ̃ ʒwɑ̃ de ɡeʁɛ]; Breton: Sant-Yowan-an-Havreg) is a commune in the Ille-et-Vilaine department of Brittany in northwestern France.

== Population ==
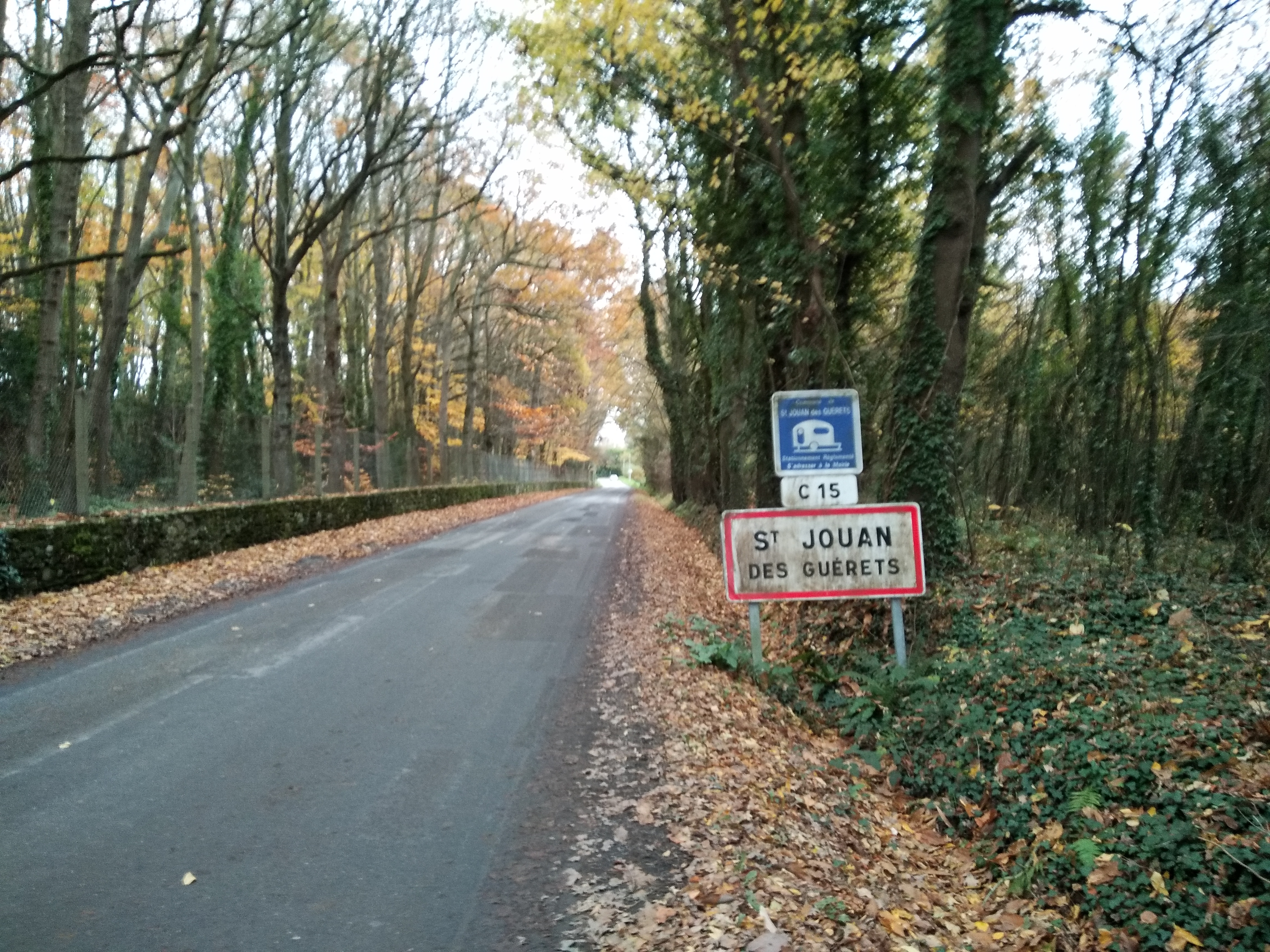
City limit sign along the C15 road.

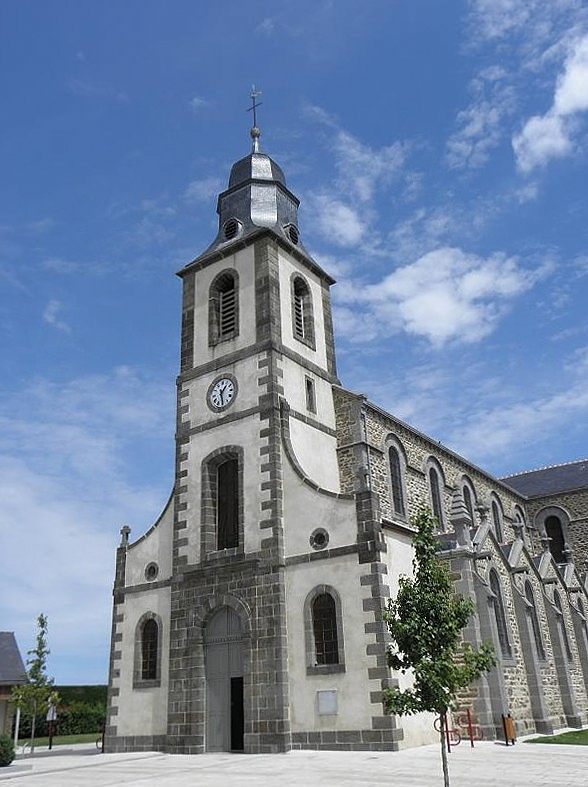
Saint-Jean-Baptiste church.

Inhabitants of Saint-Jouan-des-Guérets are called jouannais in French.

Historical population
Year	Pop.	±% p.a.
1968	1,025	—
1975	1,236	+2.71%
1982	1,406	+1.86%
1990	2,221	+5.88%
1999	2,484	+1.25%
2007	2,686	+0.98%
2012	2,603	−0.63%
2017	2,646	+0.33%
2023	2,847	+1.23%
Source: INSEE

== See also ==
- Communes of the Ille-et-Vilaine department
- Jean-Marie Valentin
