= Dinard =

Town in Brittany, France

Dinard Dinarzh (Breton)
- Commune
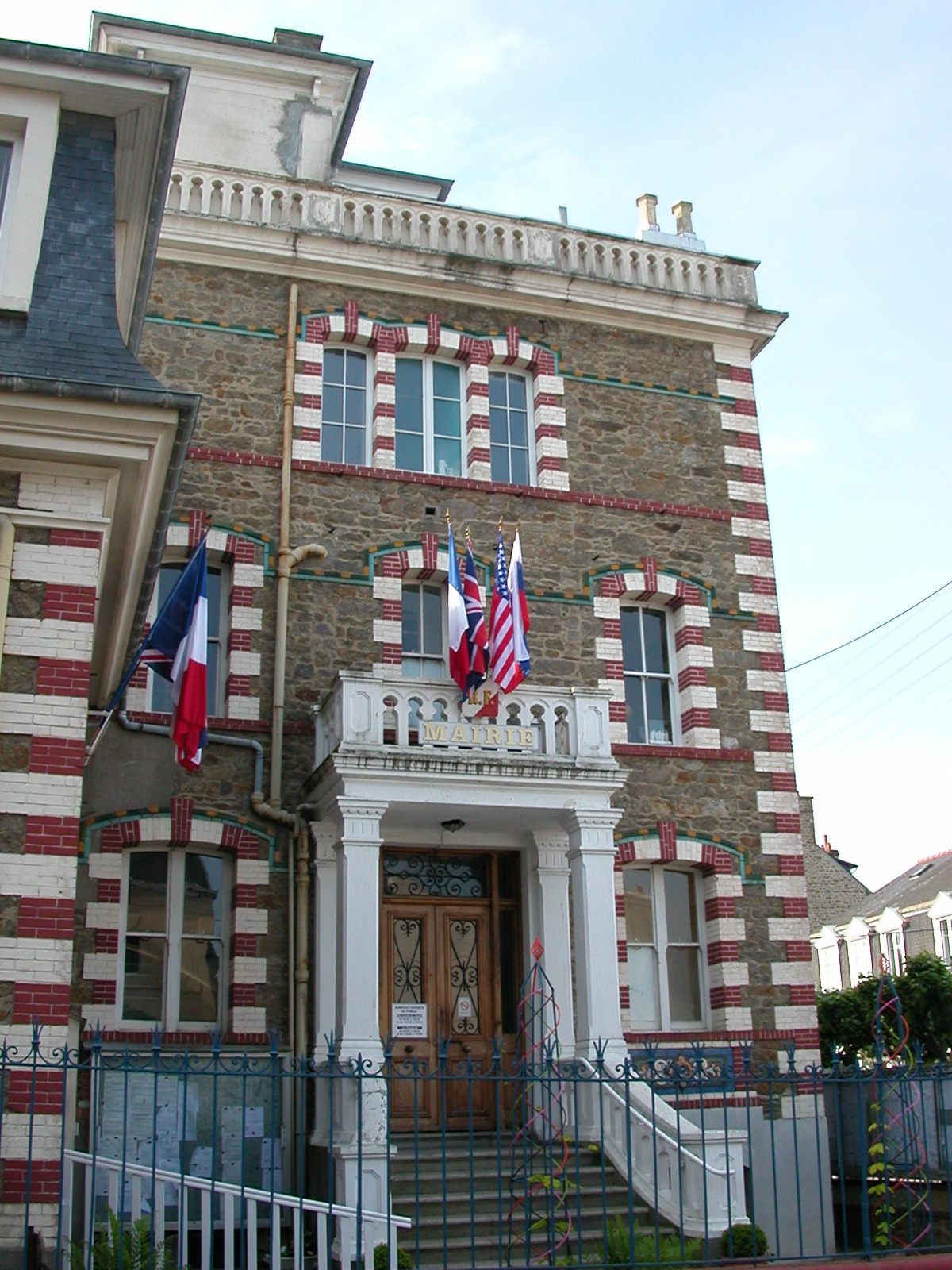
- Town hall

- Flag Coat of arms
- Location of Dinard
- Location within France Location within Brittany
- Coordinates: 48°38′N 2°04′W
- Country: France
- Region: Brittany
- Department: Ille-et-Vilaine
- Arrondissement: Saint-Malo
- Canton: Saint-Malo-2

Government
  - Mayor (2020–2026): Arnaud Salmon
- Area^{1}: 8 km^{2} (3.1 sq mi)
- Elevation: 28 m (92 ft)
- Highest elevation: 56 m (184 ft)
- Lowest elevation: 0 m (0 ft)
- Population (2023): 10,772
  - Density: 1,300/km^{2} (3,500/sq mi)
- Time zone: UTC+01:00 (CET)
  - Summer (DST): UTC+02:00 (CEST)
- INSEE/Postal code: 35093 /35800
- ^{1} French Land Register data, which excludes lakes, ponds, glaciers > 1 km^{2} (0.386 sq mi or 247 acres) and river estuaries.

Dinard (French pronunciation: [dinaʁ]; Breton: Dinarzh, [ˈdiːnars]; Gallo: Dinard) is a commune in the Ille-et-Vilaine department, Brittany, northwestern France.

Dinard is on Brittany's Côte d'Émeraude. Its beaches and mild climate make it a holiday destination, and the town has had various famous visitors and residents. The towns of Pleurtuit and Saint-Malo are nearby and the Dinard–Pleurtuit–Saint-Malo Airport is about 4 km to the south.

With its international film festival, villas, sumptuous hotels and casino, Dinard is regarded as one of France's most prestigious seaside resorts.

The town's official name was Saint-Énogat until 1879, Dinard-Saint-Énogat from 1879 to 1921, and Dinard since 1921. Saint-Énogat is still a district of the city, close to the sea and home to many small shops.

The city also has a football club, FCD (Football Club Dinardais), which includes categories from U6 to Senior. The club is backed by the town hall and the city of Dinard, which helps with equipment, transport, grounds, and organization.

Dinard hosts the Jumping Internationnale in show jumping every year.

== History ==
In modern history Dinard was first settled by Saint-Malo's shipping merchants, who built some of the town's larger houses, very few of which survive. In the late 19th century, American and British aristocrats made Dinard a fashionable summer resort and built stunning villas on the cliff tops and exclusive hotels such as Le Grand Hotel on the seafront during the Belle Époque.

The name Dinard comes from the words "Din" ("hill"/"fort") and Ard/Art ("fortified"). It has been claimed, probably erroneously, that the second element means "bear"/"Arthur"); in Celtic mythology, bears symbolize sovereignty. The town council is in the process of removing the bear from the municipal flag, a decision the former mayor opposes.

Originally, Dinard was part of the parish of Saint-Énogat. In the late 19th century, the resort became popular with wealthy British nationals, who built villas on the coast. Dinard rapidly expanded. It began to decline in the 1930s, when the fashionable social set started preferring the Côte d'Azur. Today, Dinard is considered one of the most "British" of France's coastal resorts. It has 407 listed villas.

U.S. forces liberated Dinard in August 1944, during the Battle of Saint-Malo.

== Population ==
Dinard's inhabitants are called Dinardais.

Historical population
Year	Pop.	±% p.a.
1968	9,052	—
1975	9,234	+0.28%
1982	9,590	+0.54%
1990	9,918	+0.42%
1999	10,430	+0.56%
2007	10,643	+0.25%
2012	10,141	−0.96%
2017	10,027	−0.23%
2023	10,772	+1.20%
Source: INSEE

== Climate ==
Dinard lies on the Gulf Stream and has a warm climate, several degrees warmer than the surrounding areas. The yacht club has fine examples of tropical palms and plants, which stretch round the coast on the Promenade du Clair de Lune.

Climate data for Dinard (1991–2020 normals), extremes 1950–present
Month	Jan	Feb	Mar	Apr	May	Jun	Jul	Aug	Sep	Oct	Nov	Dec	Year
Record high °C (°F)	16.4 (61.5)	20.9 (69.6)	23.7 (74.7)	27.1 (80.8)	29.2 (84.6)	36.1 (97.0)	40.0 (104.0)	39.4 (102.9)	33.1 (91.6)	28.9 (84.0)	20.6 (69.1)	17.6 (63.7)	40.0 (104.0)
Mean daily maximum °C (°F)	9.1 (48.4)	9.8 (49.6)	12.2 (54.0)	14.5 (58.1)	17.3 (63.1)	20.2 (68.4)	22.1 (71.8)	22.3 (72.1)	20.3 (68.5)	16.5 (61.7)	12.4 (54.3)	9.7 (49.5)	15.5 (59.9)
Daily mean °C (°F)	6.5 (43.7)	6.7 (44.1)	8.5 (47.3)	10.3 (50.5)	13.2 (55.8)	16.0 (60.8)	17.8 (64.0)	18.0 (64.4)	16.0 (60.8)	13.1 (55.6)	9.5 (49.1)	6.9 (44.4)	11.9 (53.4)
Mean daily minimum °C (°F)	3.8 (38.8)	3.6 (38.5)	4.9 (40.8)	6.2 (43.2)	9.1 (48.4)	11.8 (53.2)	13.6 (56.5)	13.7 (56.7)	11.8 (53.2)	9.7 (49.5)	6.5 (43.7)	4.2 (39.6)	8.2 (46.8)
Record low °C (°F)	−13.7 (7.3)	−11.7 (10.9)	−6.2 (20.8)	−2.8 (27.0)	−0.2 (31.6)	3.6 (38.5)	6.7 (44.1)	5.0 (41.0)	2.3 (36.1)	−4.2 (24.4)	−5.9 (21.4)	−9.6 (14.7)	−13.7 (7.3)
Average precipitation mm (inches)	64.0 (2.52)	56.0 (2.20)	47.6 (1.87)	53.9 (2.12)	56.0 (2.20)	54.1 (2.13)	46.1 (1.81)	58.3 (2.30)	60.2 (2.37)	81.3 (3.20)	89.0 (3.50)	85.5 (3.37)	752.0 (29.61)
Average precipitation days (≥ 1.0 mm)	11.8	11.3	10.1	10.4	9.0	8.4	7.6	9.0	9.4	13.1	14.0	13.8	127.9
Average relative humidity (%)	84	81	79	79	79	81	81	81	82	85	84	85	81.8
Mean monthly sunshine hours	68.7	91.2	132.7	178.9	202.6	207.5	220.7	201.4	170.1	114.2	79.6	65.8	1,733.4
Source: Meteo France Infoclimat.fr (humidity 1961–1990), and Meteociel

== Hotels ==
Dinard's town center with its roundabout around which are several restaurants and pubs, a hotel and a cinema

The most exclusive hotels are the Grand Hôtel Barrière (5-star), which overlooks the Rance Estuary, and Castelbrac (5-star), the former Villa "Bric à Brac". Other notable hotels are the Royal, which sits next to the Casino above the main Esplanade, and the Hotel de la Reine Hortense, with a direct view of the Ecluse beach and Saint Malo. Further round the coast in the Saint-Énogat area is the Thalassa Dinard and Villas de La Falaise. This exclusive seawater therapy centre is one of only a few in Europe. Its architecture is sympathetic with the coastline, and from some angles becomes at one with the cliffside.

In summer, the population swells to over 40,000 with the influx of vacationers.

== Visitors ==
Dinard's reputation as the "Cannes of the North" has attracted a wide variety of stars. Joan Collins is a frequent visitor, and Winston Churchill enjoyed holidaying on the River Rance. T. E. Lawrence lived in Dinard as a child and Picasso painted there in the 1920s. Debussy is supposed to have had the idea for La Mer during a visit to Saint-Énogat in 1902. In 1996, Éric Rohmer filmed parts of A Summer's Tale in Dinard. Oscar Wilde also visited, and mentions it in De Profundis. Welsh singer-songwriter Iwan Rheon's first studio album is named after Dinard.

The Wales national football team used Dinard as its base during UEFA Euro 2016.

== Attractions ==
Dinard has little nightlife, but many bars and fine restaurants. The abundant beaches and consistently sunny weather attract many visitors during summer holidays. Attractions include a casino with a restaurant facing the sea and a hall that hosts many expositions.

The nearby towns of Saint-Briac-sur-Mer and Saint-Lunaire have a fairly large golf course and the beach of Longchamp, renowned as a "surfers' spot".

== Film festivals ==
=== Dinard Francophone Film Festival ===
The Dinard Francophone Film Festival, originally called the Festival international du film d'expression française (International French-language Film Festival), also known as the Festival du film et d'échanges francophones (FIFEF; Festival of Francophone Film and Exchanges) in 1973, was a Francophone film festival inaugurated on 9 July 1969. Its last edition was in 1974.

=== Dinard British Film Festival ===
In early October, Dinard hosts the Dinard British Film Festival, a festival of British and Irish cinema. Founded in 1989 by Thierry de la Fournière, the festival has become an important vector for films wishing to conquer the European market.

== Educational facilities ==
Dinard has many educational facilities, mostly elementary and primary schools and two secondary schools. The most popular, the Collège Le Bocage, is a state school (the other is private) and has an estimated 700 pupils from Dinard and its vicinity. From there, children go on to lycée, the closest being the Lycée Jacques Cartier in Saint-Malo.

== Beaches ==
Dinard has several beaches, all of them sandy, clean and large. The main beach is Plage de l'Écluse and the second-largest are Saint-Énogat and Prieuré. Dinard also has small beaches near the city center, which offer another view of Dinard. They are all reachable by a path along the sea called «le chemin de ronde»

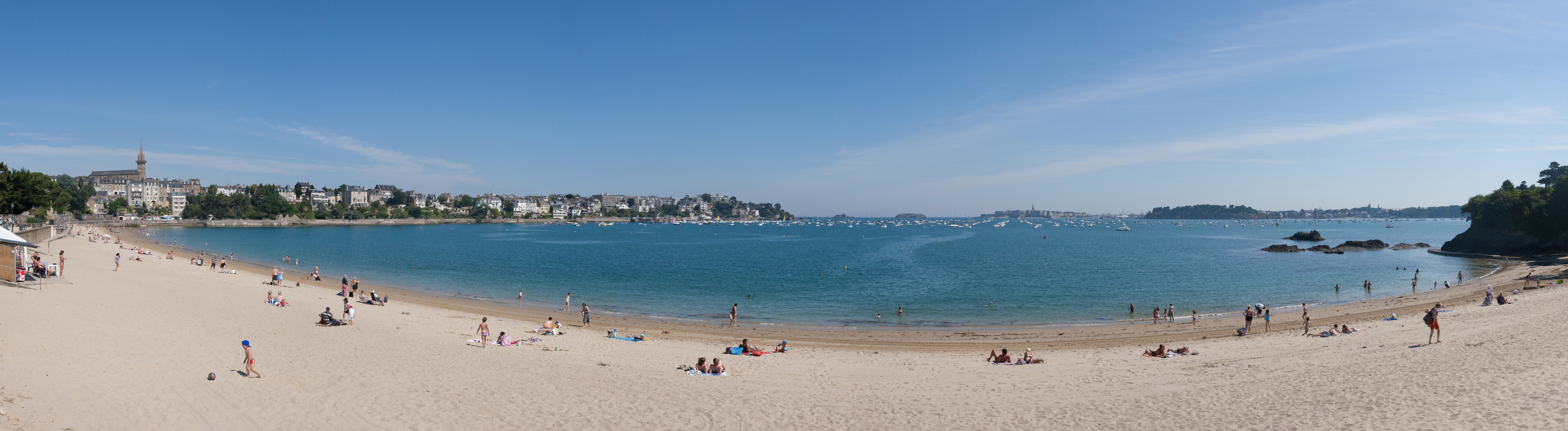
A panoramic view of Dinard in Brittany, France as viewed from the south-west.

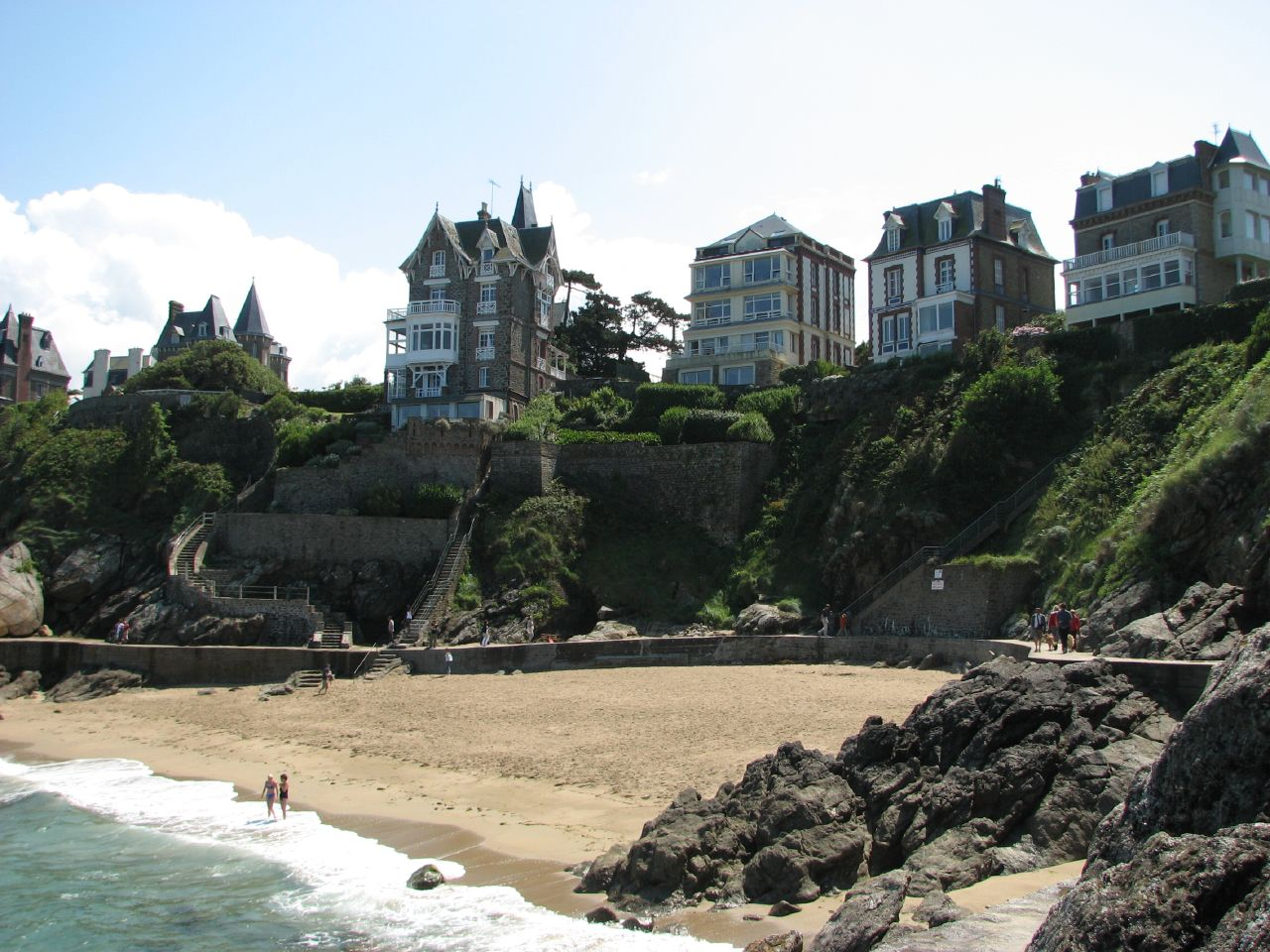
Villas seen from the Malouine beach of Dinard on 8 August 2007.

== International relations ==
Dinard is twinned with:

- Newquay, United Kingdom (since 1986)
- Starnberg, Germany (since 1977)

== Notable residents ==
- Captain Philippe Koenigswerther, French Resistance fighter, Chevalier de la Légion d'Honneur, executed by the Nazis, born in Dinard in 1918,
- Virginia d'Albert-Lake, French Resistance fighter
- Robert W. Service, Scottish poet who spent winters in Dinard from 1913 to 1929.
- Florence Delaage, classical pianist, was born in Dinard.

== Gallery ==
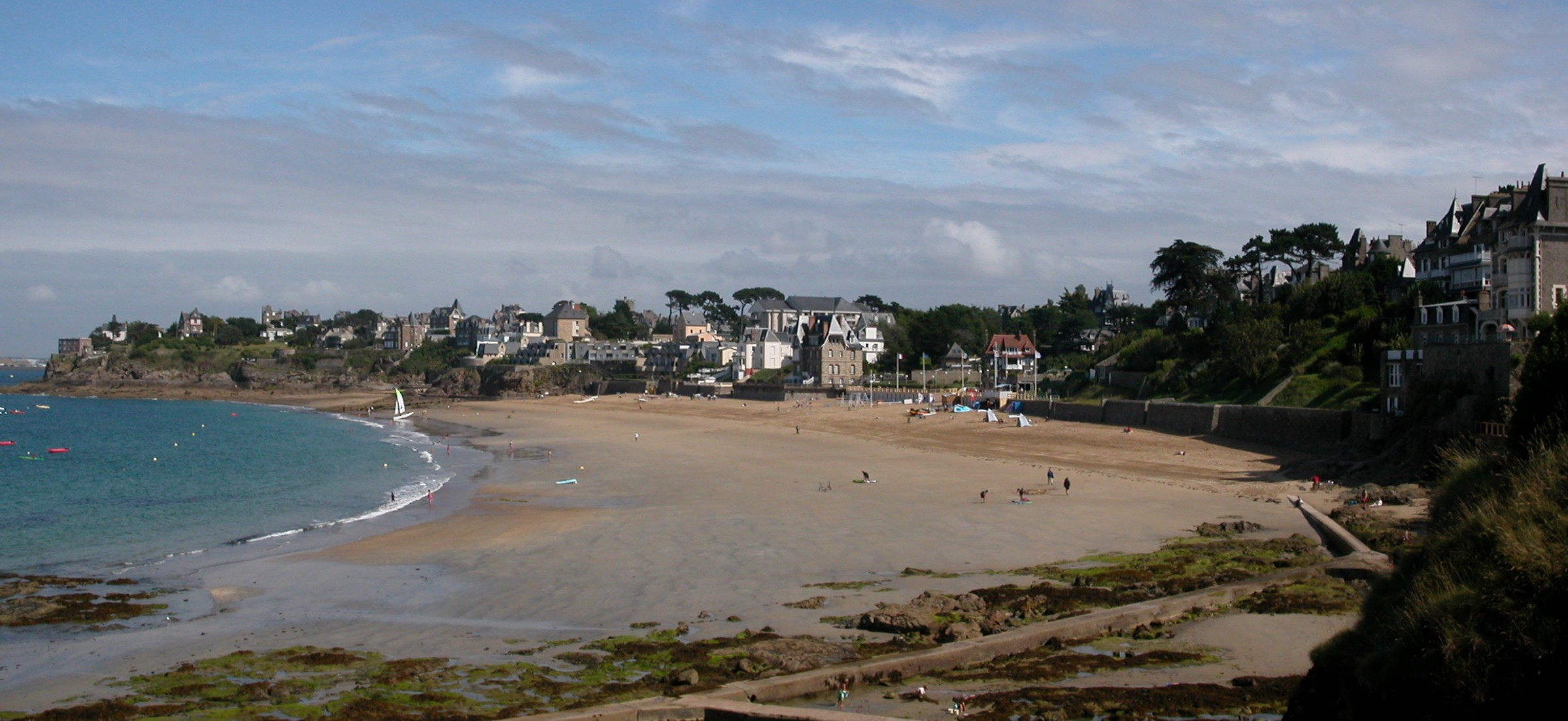
Saint-Énogat's beach, one of Dinard's four main beaches

Plage de L'Écluse

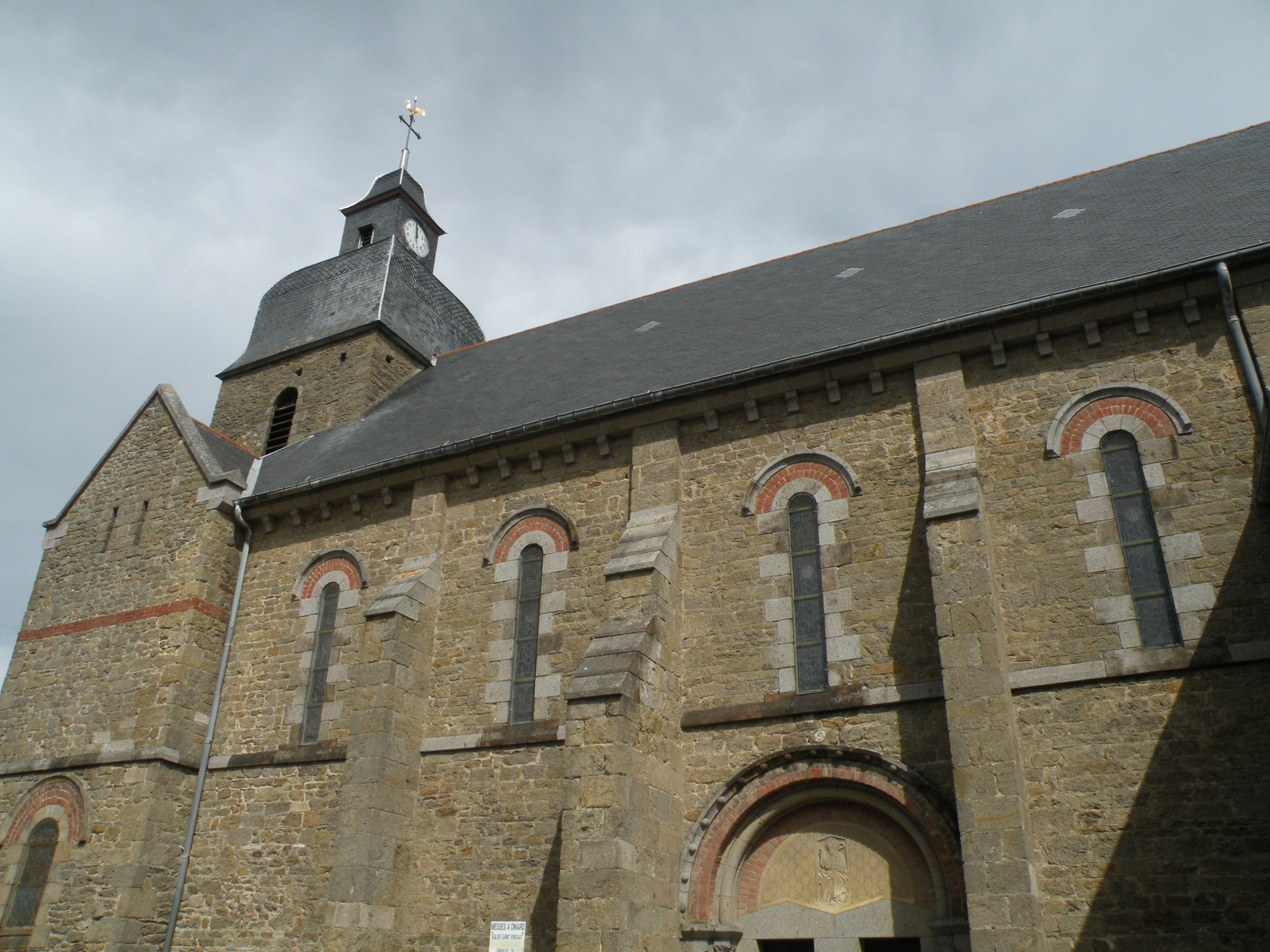
Saint Énogat church

== See also ==
- Communes of the Ille-et-Vilaine department
- Jean-Marie Valentin
