= Dinard–Pleurtuit–Saint-Malo Airport =

Airport serving St-Malo, France

Dinard–Pleurtuit–Saint-Malo Airport Aéroport de Dinard – Pleurtuit – Saint-Malo
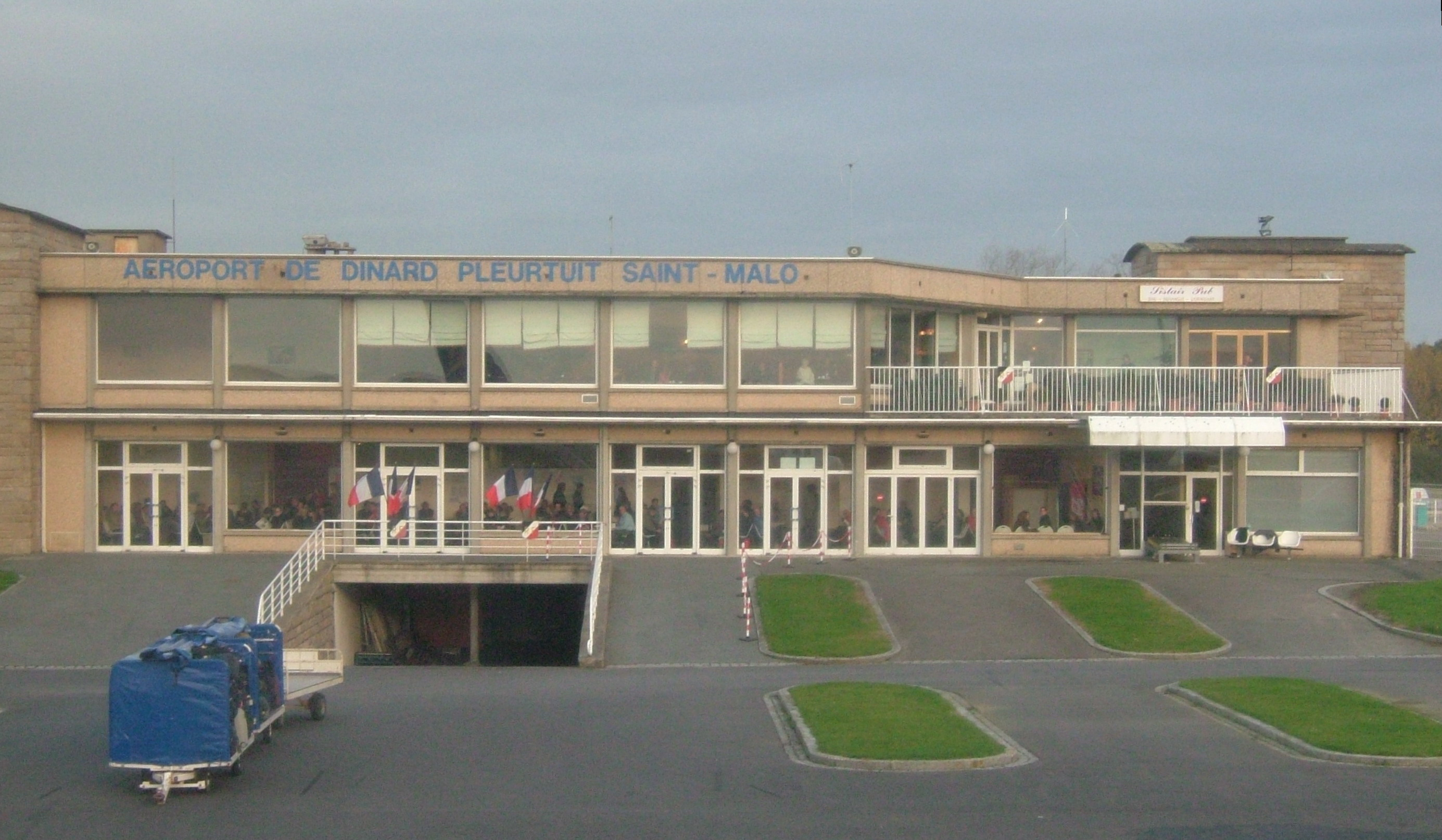
- IATA: DNR; ICAO: LFRD

Summary
- Airport type: Public
- Operator: CCI du Pays de Saint-Malo
- Serves: Saint-Malo
- Location: Pleurtuit
- Elevation AMSL: 219 ft / 67 m
- Coordinates: 48°35′16″N 002°04′48″W
- Website: Official website

Map
- Location of Dinard–Pleurtuit–Saint-Malo Airport LFRD (France)

Runways
Direction	Length		Surface
Direction	m	ft	Surface
17/35	2,200	7,218	Asphalt concrete
12/30	1,445	4,741	Asphalt concrete
17R/35L	180	591	Grass

Statistics (2017)
- Passengers: 114,016
- Passenger Change 16-17: ▲10.2%
- Source: French AIP

Dinard–Pleurtuit–Saint-Malo Airport or Aéroport de Dinard – Pleurtuit – Saint-Malo (IATA: DNR, ICAO: LFRD) is an airport serving the city of Saint-Malo, France. It is located 5 km (3.1 mi) south-southwest of Dinard in Pleurtuit, a commune of the département of Ille-et-Vilaine. It was the base of regional operator Rousseau Aviation

In 2017, Dinard-Pleurtuit-Saint-Malo airport handled 121.697 passengers, an increase of 10.2% over 2016.

== Côte d'Emeraude Flying Club ==
The flying club is located on the northeast of the 12/30 runway. It currently has four planes: a Robin DR400-180cv NM, a DR400-160cv HK, a DR221-100cv ZO and a Tecnam P2002JF CE. It is possible to get a PPL licence and an EASA LAPL (A) licence.

== Access ==
The airport is located a short distance from the major tourist cities (by car):

15 minutes from Dinard city center.
20 minutes from Dinan.
25 minutes from Saint-Malo.
55 minutes from Rennes via the N137 dual carriageway.

Taxis and car rental are available from inside of the terminal.
