= Florence Delaage =

French classical pianist

Florence Delaage is a French contemporary classical pianist.

== Biography ==
Born in Dinard of an architect father and a musician mother, Delaage played at a very young age in front of Alfred Cortot who offered to become her private teacher. Resigning from the Conservatoire de Paris, where she had just been unanimously received in first position, she followed the teaching of the master, famous co-founder of the École normale de musique de Paris. A friend of Dino Ciani, a young Italian pianist who died prematurely, she also received technical advice from György Cziffra, before pursuing a career as an international concert performer.

Although she performed in Paris, salle Gaveau, salle Pleyel and at the Théâtre des Champs-Élysées, she performed mainly and more extensively outside France, in particular in Germany, Austria, Italy, Argentina and the United States, where she regularly gives masterclasses. Every year she plays Wagner-Liszt's transcriptions at Bayreuth. Although for a long time there were few recordings available, a concert she gave in 2001 at the New Theatre of Turin was the subject of a CD, with pieces by Chopin, Ravel and Debussy. In addition, several reference CDs were produced in early 2010. This pianist, whom György Cziffra considered an "exceptional artist", is renowned for her great musicality and extreme delicacy.

Alfred Cortot bequeathed to her his pianos, after saying of her: "If I had a daughter, she would have been Florence Delaage".

On 11 March 2008, she gave a recital in Paris, Salle Gaveau, with works by Beethoven, Chopin and Wagner-Liszt.

On the occasion of the disappearance fifty years ago of Alfred Cortot, she gave a concert on 15 June 2012 at the Temple Saint Marcel, in the 5th arrondissement of Paris.

On 9 April 2014, she performed Salle Gaveau in Paris, with works by Schubert, Liszt and Chopin.

By decree of 30 December 2016 of the Presidency of the French Republic, she was appointed, on the report of the Prime Minister, chevalier of the Légion d'honneur.

== Selected discography ==
- Florence Delaage joue sur le piano d'Alfred Cortot, 2 CDs, Piano Anthology, IndéSens, 2010, INDE020
- Frédéric Chopin, 24 Préludes sur le piano d'Alfred Cortot, Piano Anthology, IndéSens, 2011, INDE031
- Liszt, Chopin, Wagner, Verdi, The Paris Concert, Hommage à Alfred Cortot, Calliope, 2013, CAL1316
- Endless Wagner (Richard Wagner in transcriptions by Liszt and von Bülow), Melism Records, 2017

== See also ==
- "Florence Delaage : Jouer avec l'orchestre, c'est un accord parfait", in Piano ma non solo, Jean-Pierre Thiollet, Paris, Anagramme éditions, 2012, p. 80-81.
- "Florence Delaage : Pour une parcelle de rêve étoilé...", in 88 notes pour piano solo, Jean-Pierre Thiollet, Paris, Neva éditions, 2015, p. 187-188. ISBN 978 2 3505 5192 0
- Four autograph letters by Florence Delaage to Nadia Boulanger (1887–1979) are available at the Bibliothèque nationale de France.
