= La Richardais =

La Richardais Kerricharzh-an-Arvor (Breton)
- Commune
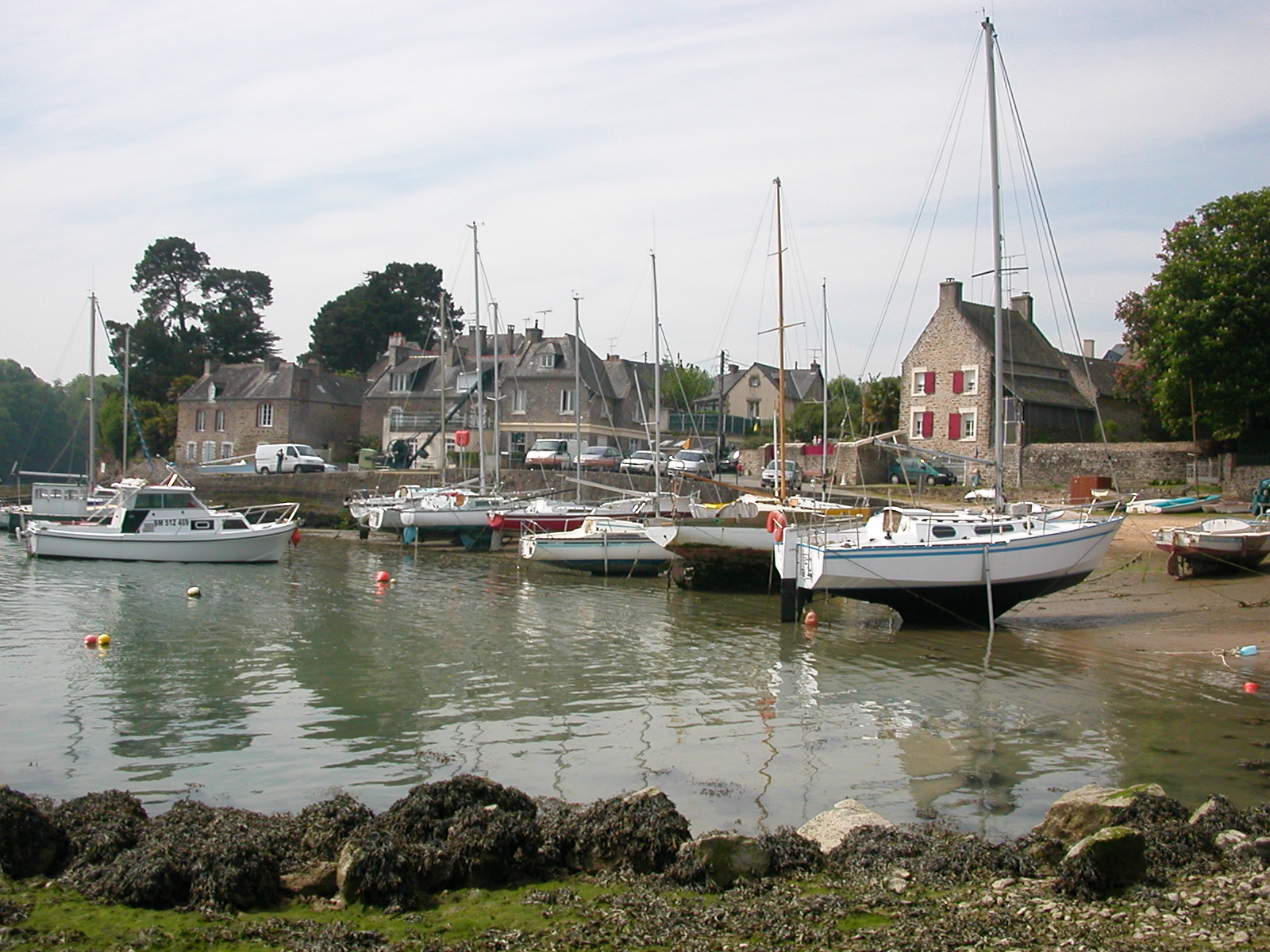
- Harbour

- Coat of arms
- Location of La Richardais
- Location within France Location within Brittany
- Coordinates: 48°36′26″N 2°02′02″W
- Country: France
- Region: Brittany
- Department: Ille-et-Vilaine
- Arrondissement: Saint-Malo
- Canton: Saint-Malo-2
- Intercommunality: Côte d'Emeraude

Government
  - Mayor (2020–2026): Pierre Contin
- Area^{1}: 3.14 km^{2} (1.21 sq mi)
- Highest elevation: 55 m (180 ft)
- Lowest elevation: 0 m (0 ft)
- Population (2023): 2,664
  - Density: 848/km^{2} (2,200/sq mi)
- Time zone: UTC+01:00 (CET)
  - Summer (DST): UTC+02:00 (CEST)
- INSEE/Postal code: 35241 /35780
- ^{1} French Land Register data, which excludes lakes, ponds, glaciers > 1 km^{2} (0.386 sq mi or 247 acres) and river estuaries.

La Richardais (French pronunciation: [la ʁiʃaʁdɛ]; Breton: Kerricharzh-an-Arvor) is a commune in the Ille-et-Vilaine department of Brittany in northwestern France.

== Population ==
Inhabitants of La Richardais are called richardaisiens in French.

Historical population
Year	Pop.	±% p.a.
1968	972	—
1975	1,222	+3.32%
1982	1,381	+1.76%
1990	1,801	+3.37%
1999	2,120	+1.83%
2007	2,287	+0.95%
2012	2,347	+0.52%
2017	2,295	−0.45%
2023	2,664	+2.52%
Source: INSEE

== See also ==
- Communes of the Ille-et-Vilaine department
