= Canton of Saint-Malo-2 =

Coordinates: 48.63°N 2.01°W

- Canton
- Country: France
- Region: Brittany
- Department: Ille-et-Vilaine
- No. of communes: {{{nbcomm}}}
- Population (2023): 46,623
- INSEE code: 35 26

The canton of Saint-Malo-2 is an administrative division of the Ille-et-Vilaine department, in northwestern France. It was created at the French canton reorganisation which came into effect in March 2015. Its seat is in Saint-Malo.

It consists of the following communes:

1. Dinard
2. Le Minihic-sur-Rance
3. Pleurtuit
4. La Richardais
5. Saint-Briac-sur-Mer
6. Saint-Jouan-des-Guérets
7. Saint-Lunaire
8. Saint-Malo (partly)
