= Saint-Lunaire =

Saint-Lunaire Sant-Luner (Breton)
- Commune
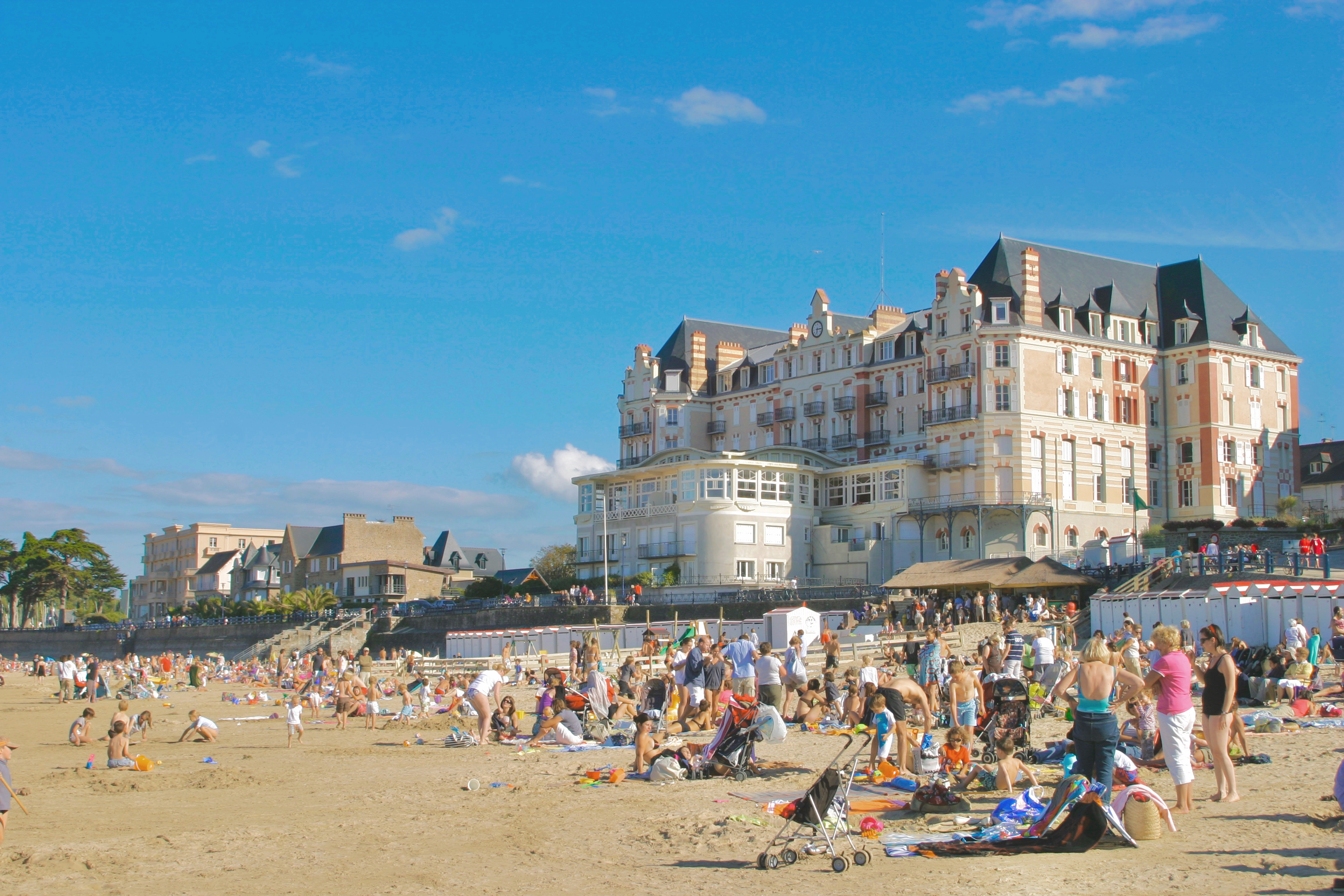
- Grand Hotel

- Coat of arms
- Location of Saint-Lunaire
- Location within France Location within Brittany
- Coordinates: 48°38′07″N 2°06′27″W
- Country: France
- Region: Brittany
- Department: Ille-et-Vilaine
- Arrondissement: Saint-Malo
- Canton: Saint-Malo-2
- Intercommunality: Côte d'Emeraude

Government
  - Mayor (2020–2026): Michel Penhouët
- Area^{1}: 10.27 km^{2} (3.97 sq mi)
- Elevation: 21 m (69 ft)
- Highest elevation: 64 m (210 ft)
- Lowest elevation: 0 m (0 ft)
- Population (2023): 2,768
  - Density: 269.5/km^{2} (698.1/sq mi)
- Time zone: UTC+01:00 (CET)
  - Summer (DST): UTC+02:00 (CEST)
- INSEE/Postal code: 35287 /35800
- ^{1} French Land Register data, which excludes lakes, ponds, glaciers > 1 km^{2} (0.386 sq mi or 247 acres) and river estuaries.

Saint-Lunaire (French pronunciation: [sɛ̃ lynɛʁ]; Breton: Sant-Luner) is a commune in the Ille-et-Vilaine department in Brittany in northwestern France.

Fantastic viewpoints on the Pointe du Décollé, hill of La Garde Guérin and the Pointe du Nick.

== History ==
Evidence of Neolithic settlement remains in the form of a stone path (dolmen) (2000–5000 BC) at Plate-Roche.

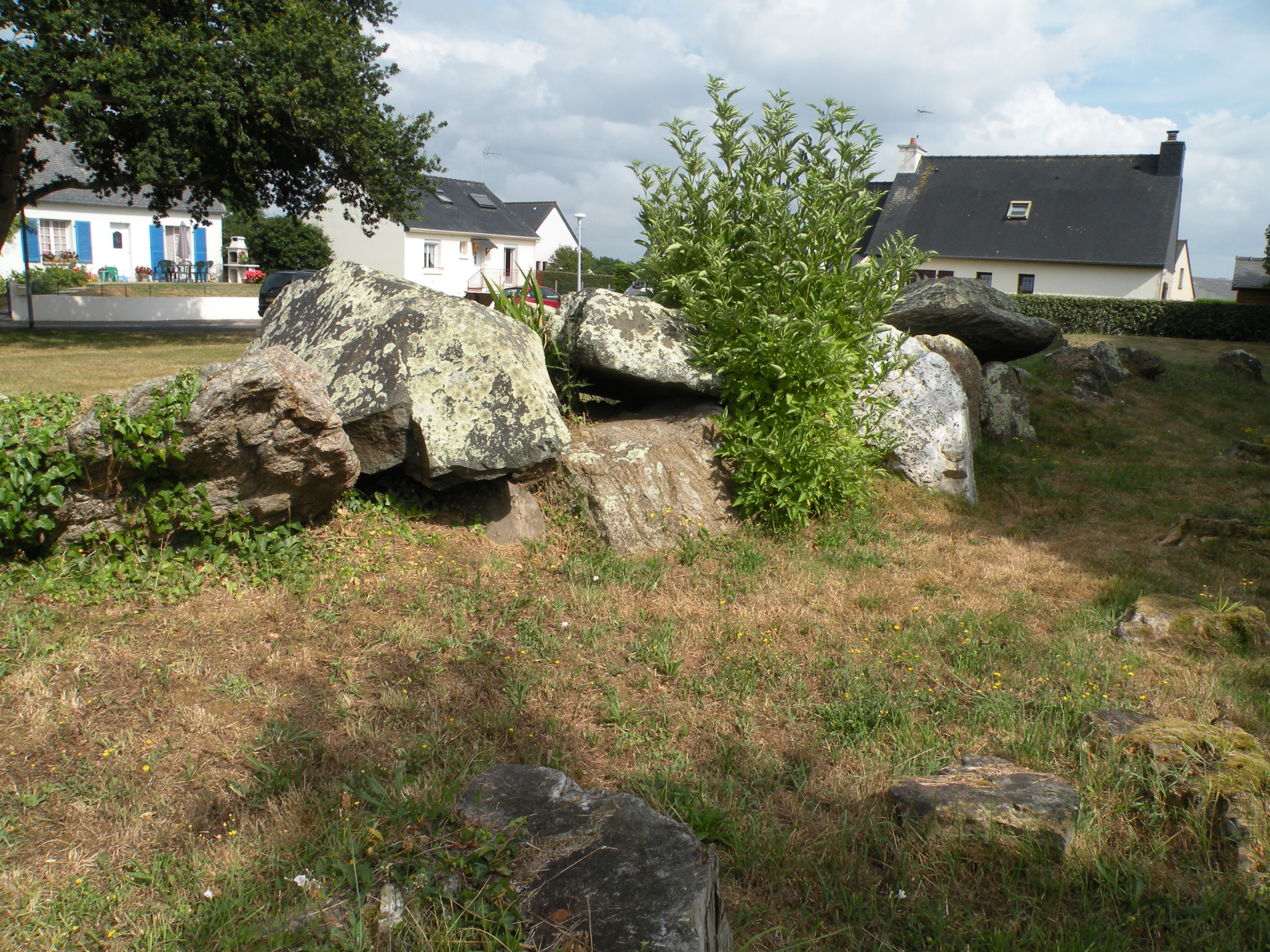
Neolithic remains at Plate Roche.

The Roman conquest had little impact on the ancient settlement of farmer-fishermen. Far greater changes occurred several centuries later, with the Saxons and Frisons invasions in the early sixth century. In 513, the new King of Armorica, Hoël I, landed on the island of Cézembre. This new regime favoured the settlement of missionaries from Cornwall, and in particular one of King Hoël's sons, Saint Lunarius (or Léonor), together with Saint Pompeius (or Coupaia), Saint Tugdual's brother, or Saint Sève and numerous monks and secular priests, who started clearing the local forest of Ponthul and erected a first chapel on the location of the present "Old Church".

According to one story, the local bishop granted a bell to St Lunarius and, with it, authority over all the hamlets lying within the sound of the bell. This area roughly corresponds to the old feudal lordship of Ponthual and, later, the municipality of Saint-Lunaire. The legend states that the inhabitants of a hamlet on the eastern edge of this area tried to maintain their independence by denying that they had heard the bell. This might explain the origins of the name of the suburb of "La Fourberie" ('Deceit' or 'Cunning'), next to Dinard.

Saint-Léonor thus became the main borough of the lordship of Ponthual, surrounded by various dependent hamlets. During the eleventh century, the family of Ponthual built the Old Church ("la Vieille Eglise"), which is one of the relatively rare romanesque churches of Brittany.

The town's name changed to "Saint-Léonaire de Ponthual" at the end of the seventeenth century and then to "Saint-Lunaire de Ponthual".

In February 1790, the revolutionary authorities established the first modern municipality with the name of "Port-Lunaire". This name lasted until 1803 when it was definitively changed to "Saint-Lunaire". The town slowly expanded during the first half of the 19th century. When Victor Hugo visited the area with Juliette Drouet, he might well have visited the little fishing port whilst preparing his novel on local fishermen, Toilers of the Sea(1866) - in which a murder is committed at the end of Saint-Lunaire's Decolle promontory.

Saint-Lunaire had changed radically by the end of the twentieth century. The local population grew with the development of Saint-Malo's fishing industry, particularly in the waters off Newfoundland. A model ship hanging from the ceiling of the new church serves as a reminder of Saint-Lunaire's many sailors. The local economy was later boosted by the development of the town as a fashionable sea resort.

Following the creation of Dinard in the 1860s, a couple of holiday houses were built along the Decollé promontory, starting with "La Trinité" by an Italian artist or one of several built by Baron de Kerpezdron.

Speculators later erected the sea front on the main beach and the Grand Hotel with its casino. Many private houses and luxury hotels were constructed around the turn of the century. This period was Saint-Lunaire's heyday, when many celebrities, artists and intellectuals came to visit.

Saint-Lunaire never quite recovered its former standing after the Second World War, but Saint-Lunaire and its neighbour Saint-Briac-sur-Mer are still considered to be two of Brittany's most elegant resorts.

== Population ==
Inhabitants of Saint-Lunaire are called lunairiens in French.

Historical population
Year	Pop.	±% p.a.
1968	1,578	—
1975	1,585	+0.06%
1982	2,020	+3.53%
1990	2,163	+0.86%
1999	2,250	+0.44%
2007	2,315	+0.36%
2012	2,301	−0.12%
2017	2,356	+0.47%
2023	2,768	+2.72%
Source: INSEE

== Sights ==
=== Historical monuments ===
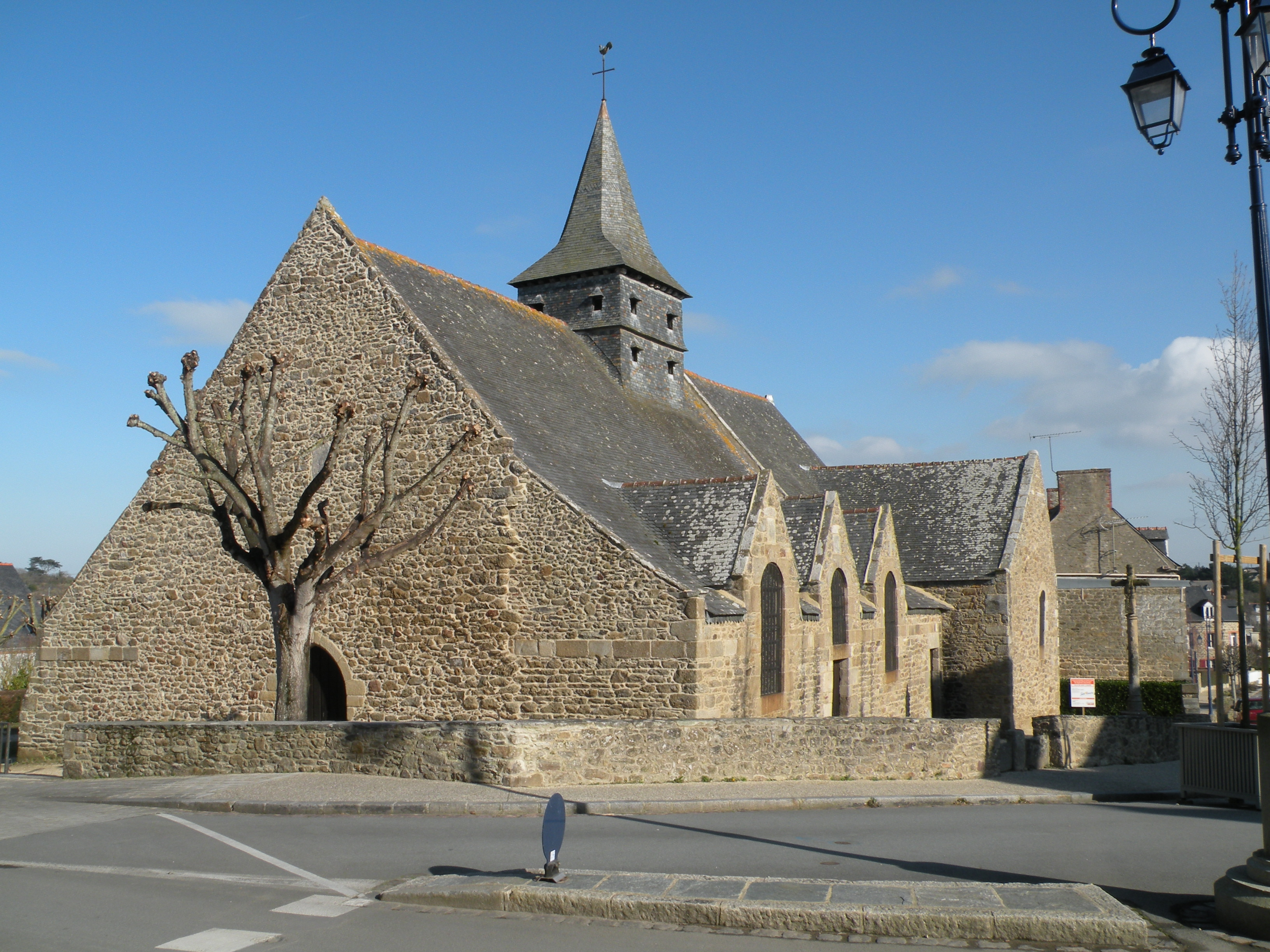
La vieille église (the Old Church).

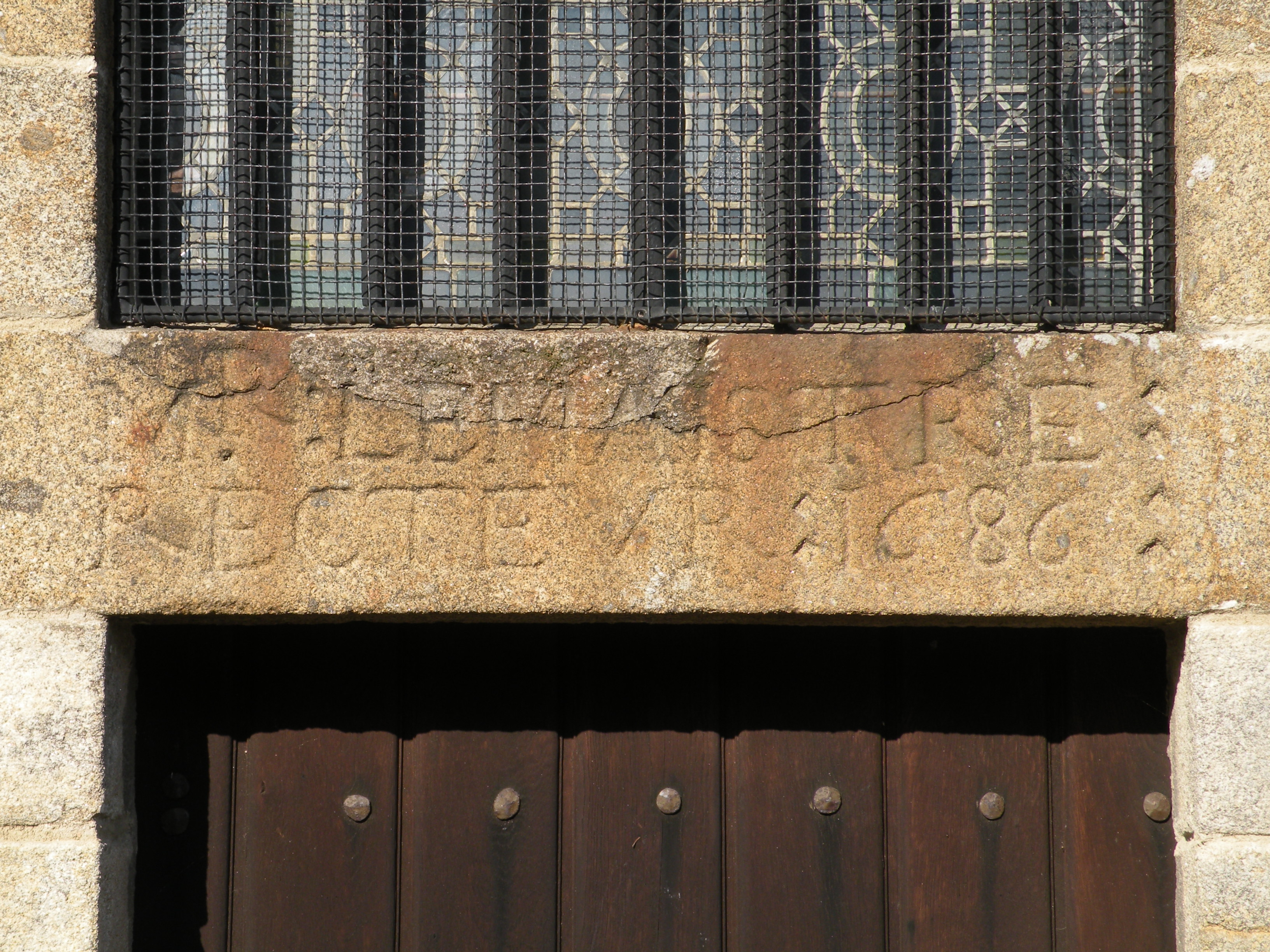
Lintel above the entrance door of the Old Church.

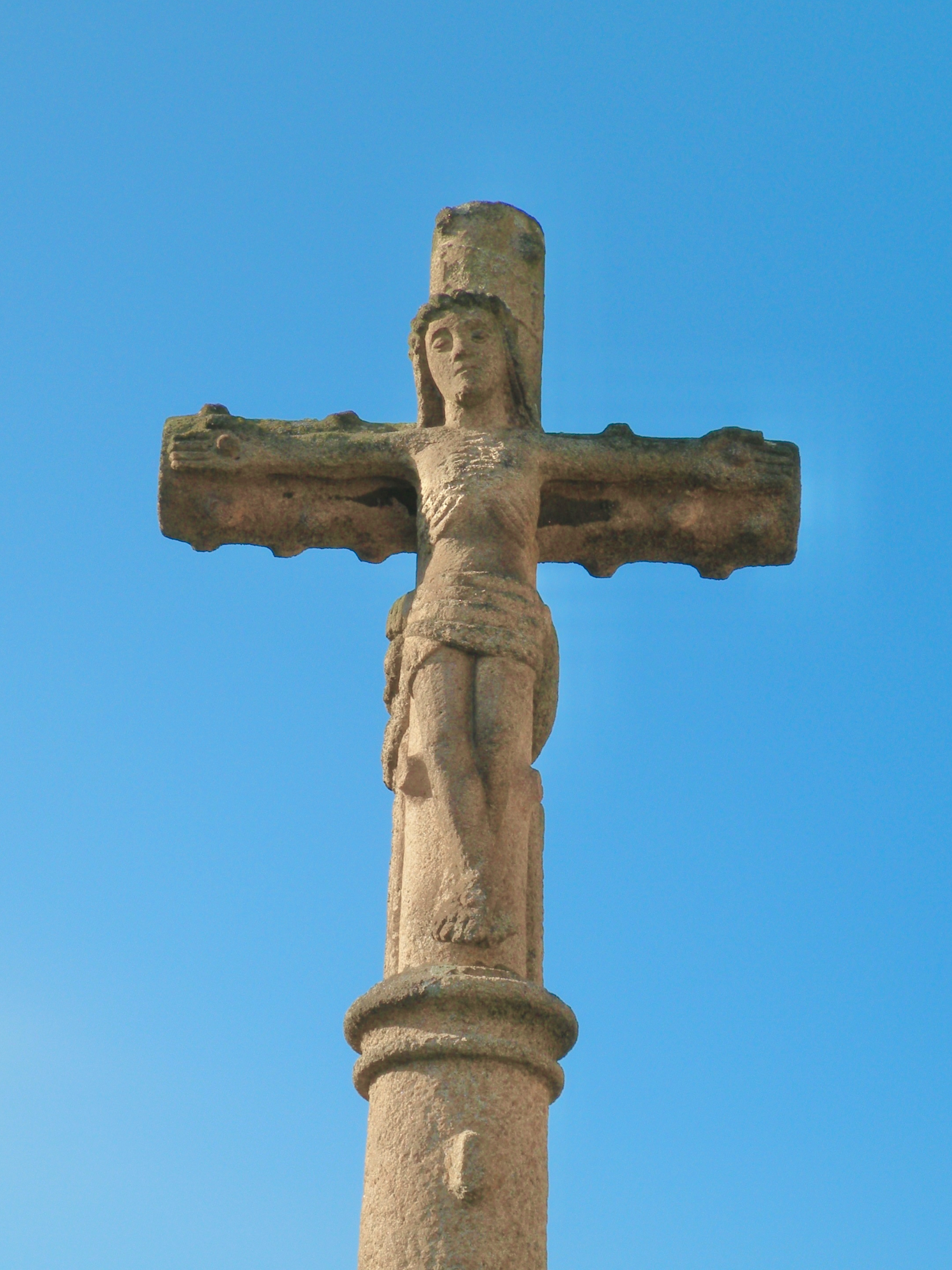
Calvary, East side with the Christ.

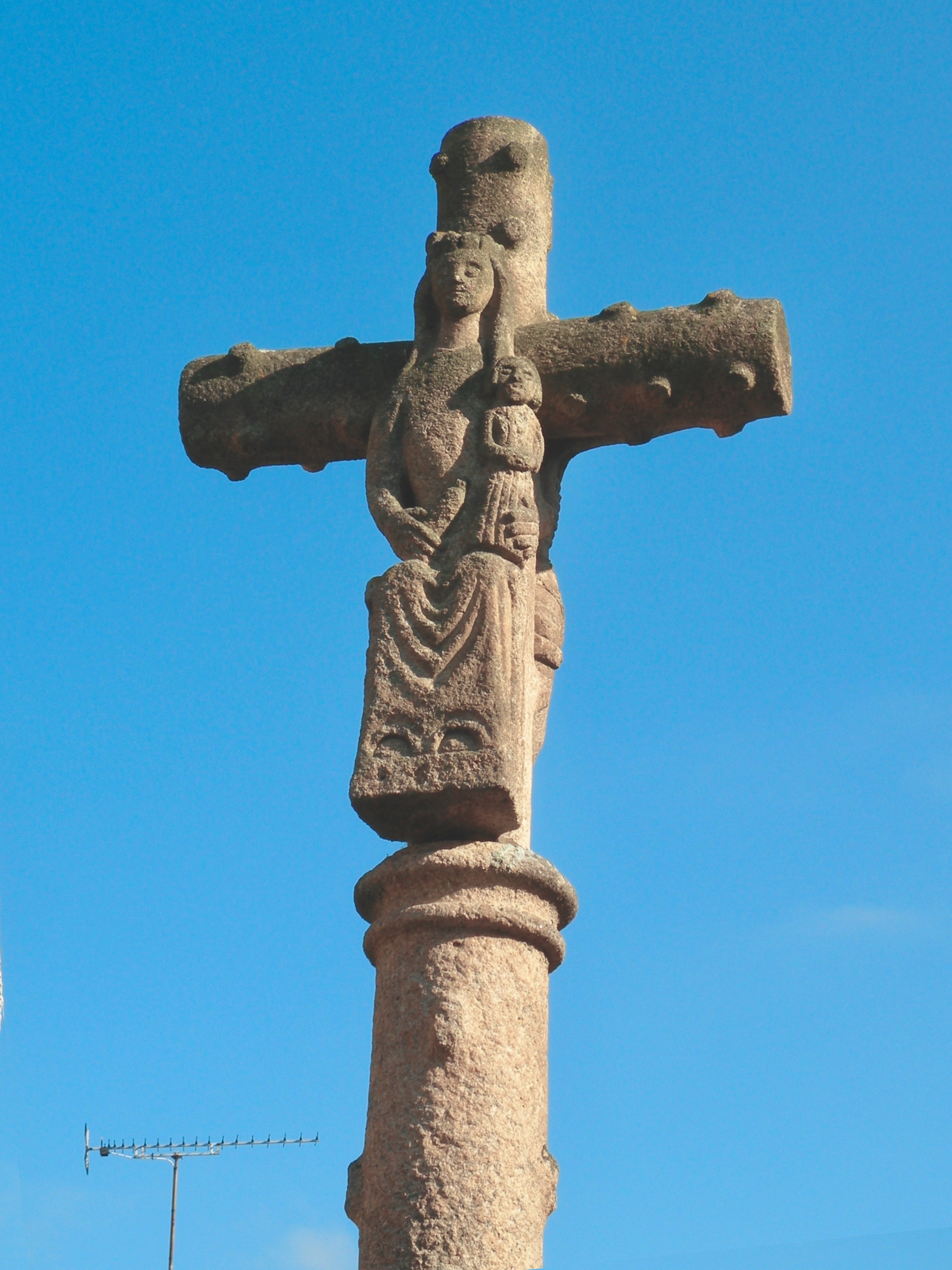
Calvary, West side, with Holy Mary and her Son.

Two historical monuments are registered in Saint-Lunaire:

- La vieille église, the Old Church, was restored in 1954. The 11th century nave is surrounded with two smaller sides, and joins the choir (sole Gothic part of this Roman style church) by a triumphant arch. Side chapels host the graves of local lords, the Pontual and Pontbriand families. In the middle of the nave a Gallo-Roman sarcophagus with an engraved lid is presumed Saint-Lunaire's grave (although buried in various other locations), and folk traditions used to see bride and grooms roll under the grave for good luck.
- As always, the old church was surrounded by the graveyard. But the latter was removed in the 1950s, and the 16th calvary only remains on the south side of the church, with two noticeable sides, the Christ on the east side and the holy Mary with her son on the west one.

=== Natural sites ===
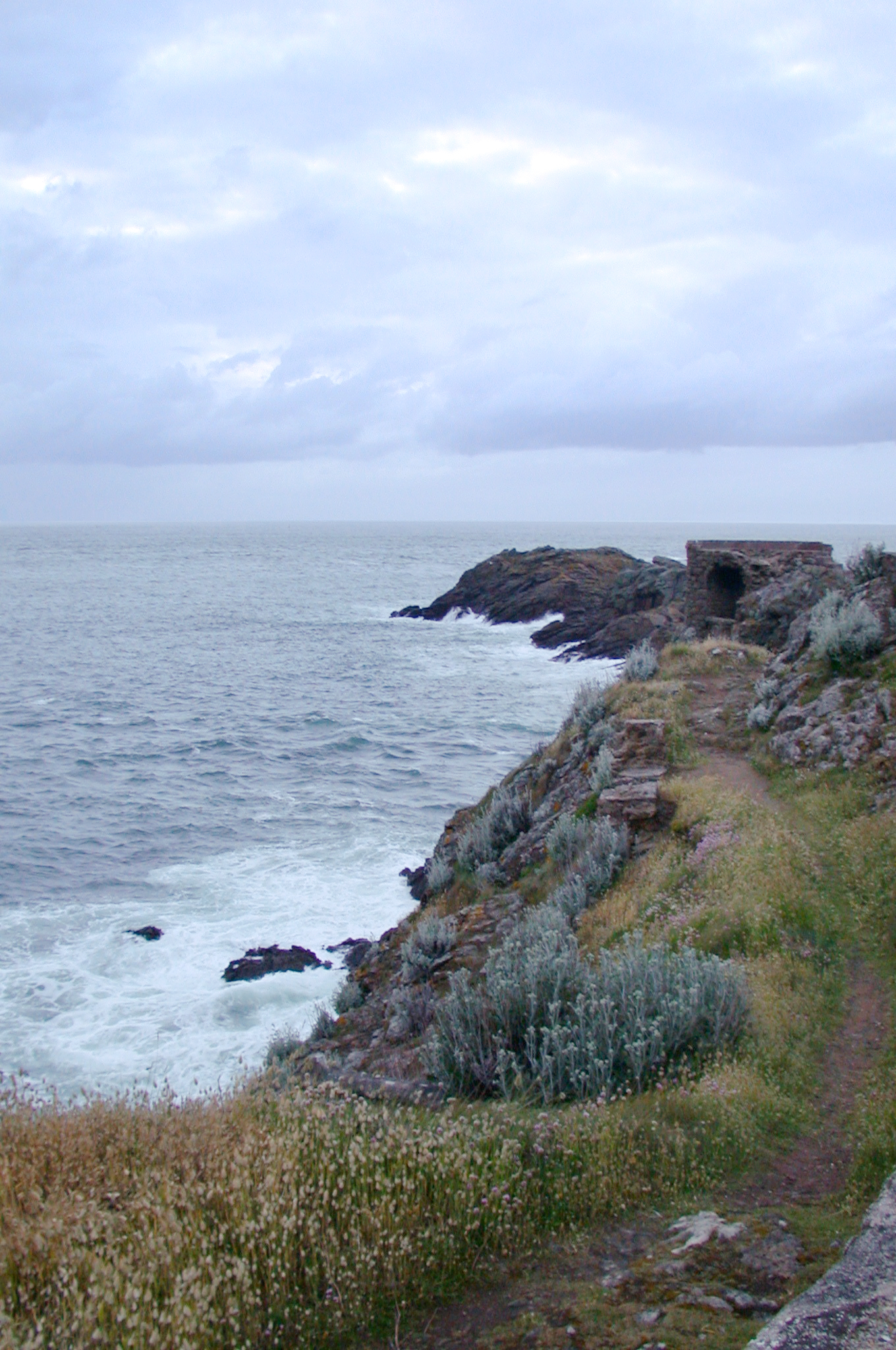
End of the Decolle peninsula

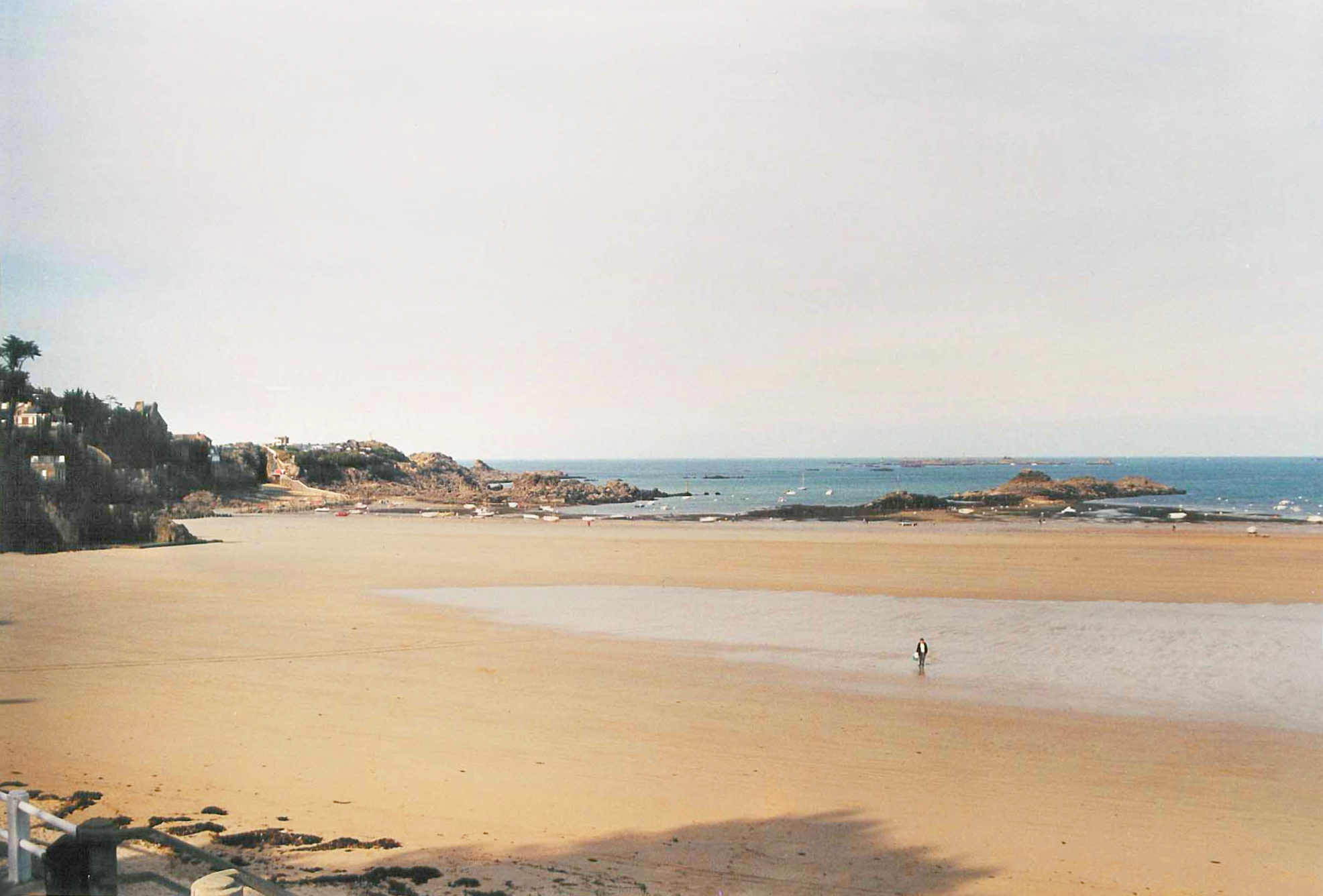
Grand' Plage at low tide

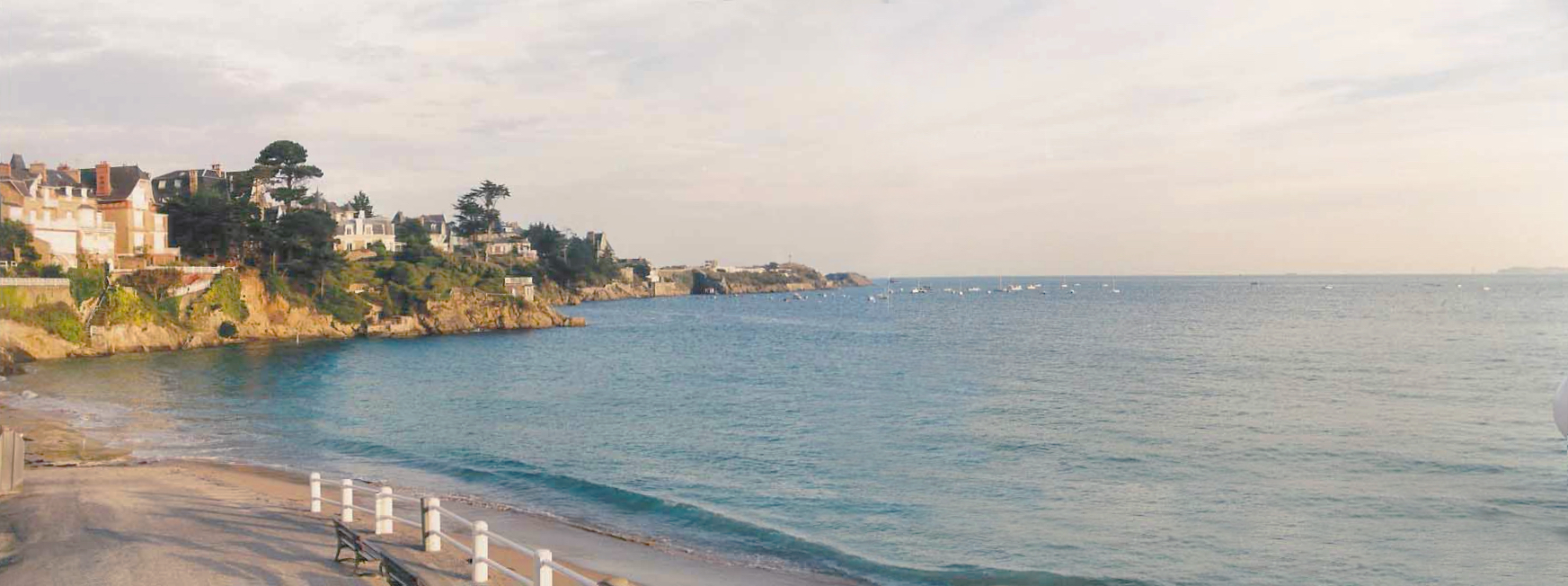
Grand' Plage at high tide

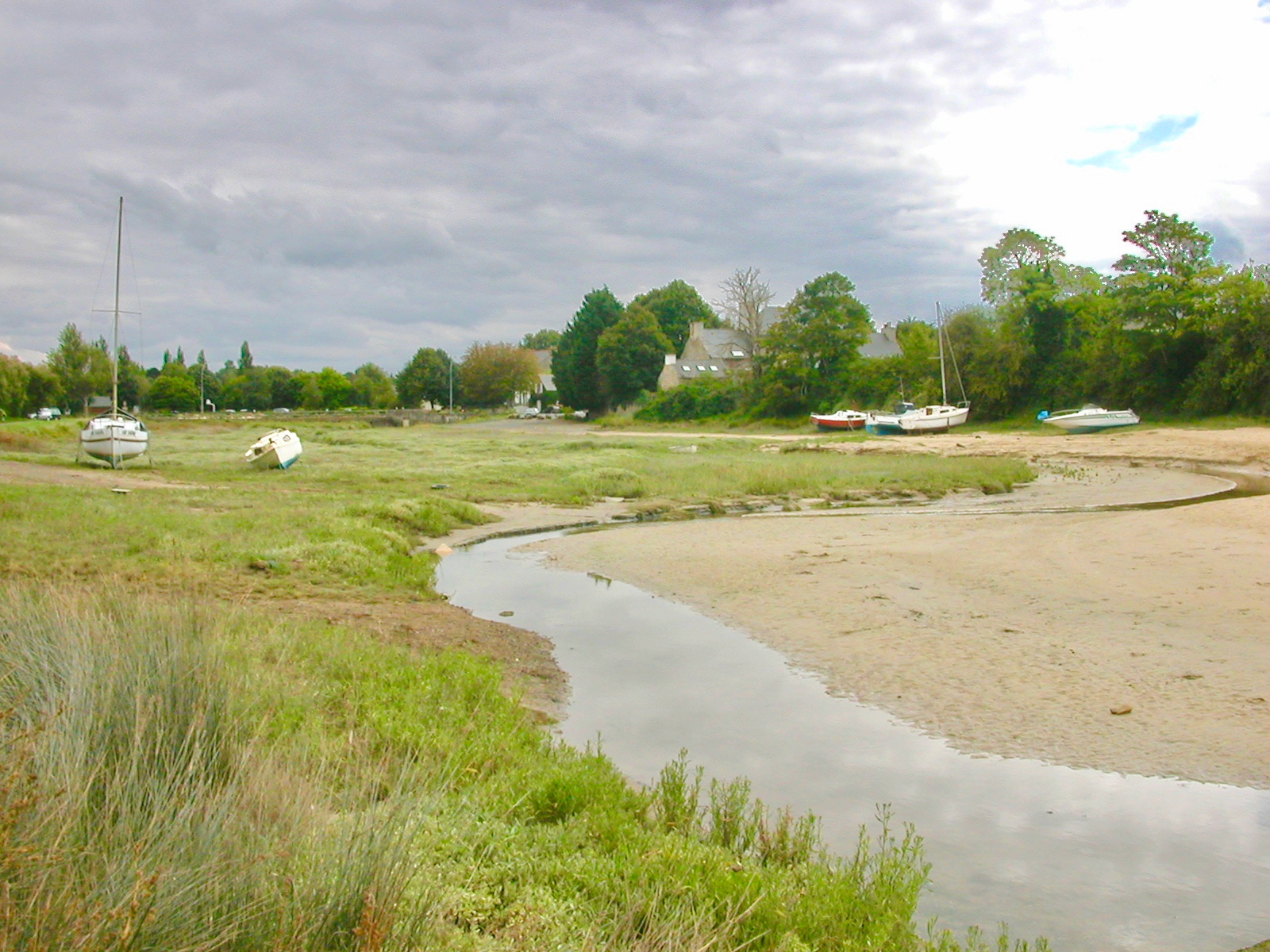
Le Goulet at low tide

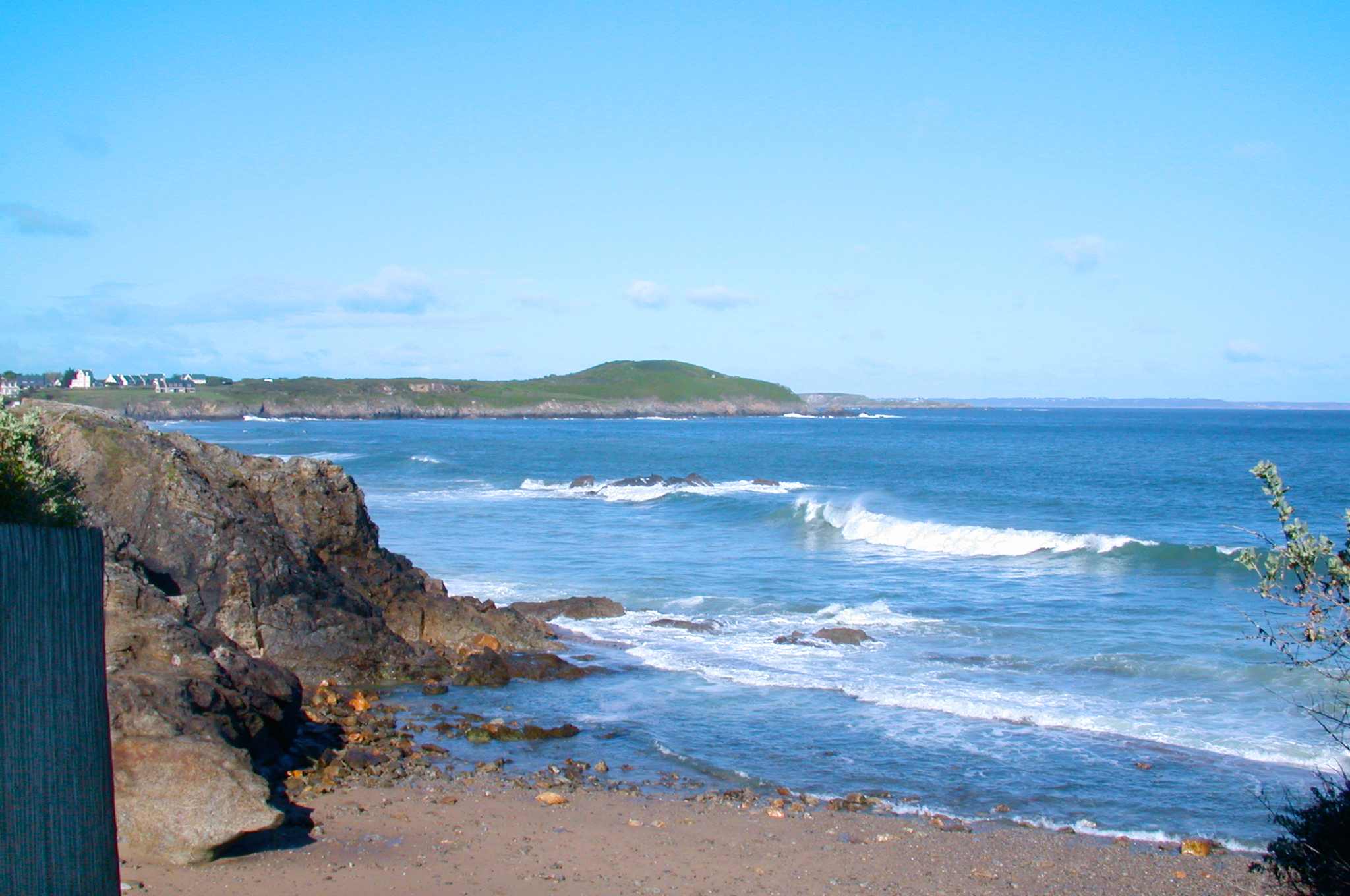
Plage de Longchamp towards Garde Guérin (Saint-Briac) and Fréhel peninsula

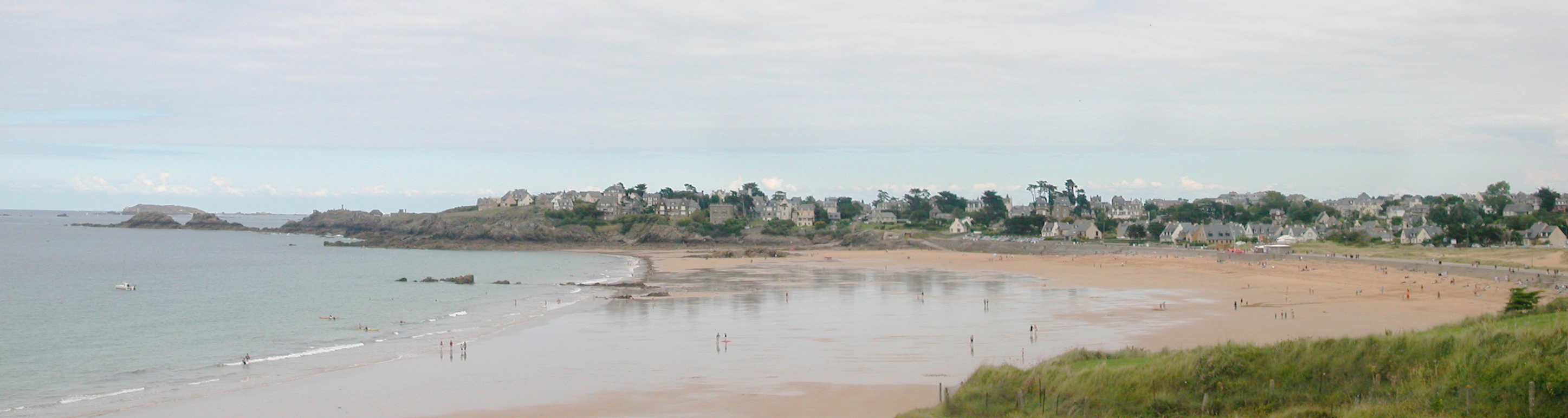
Plage de Longchamp, West of Decolle peninsula

=== Pictures ===
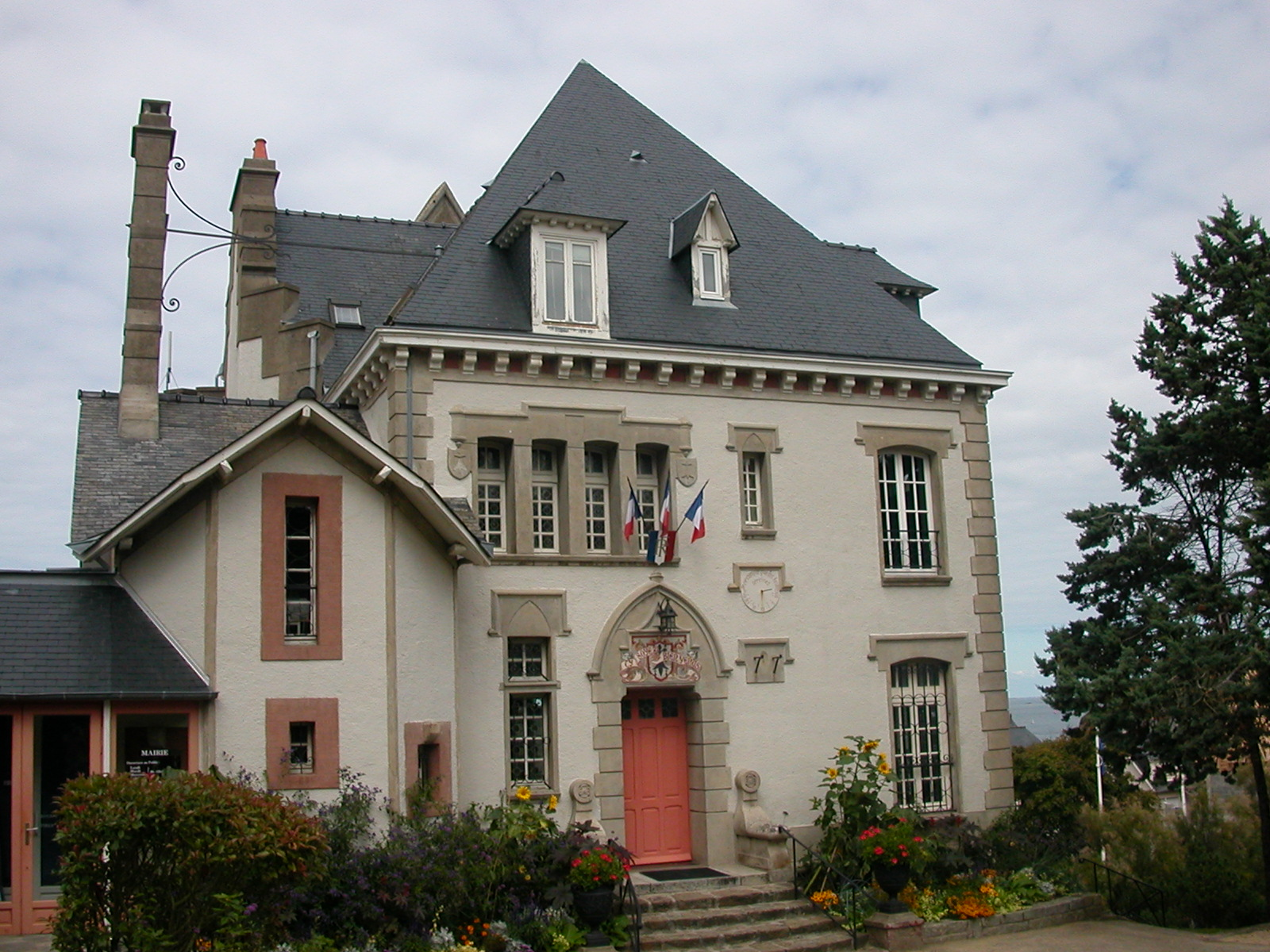
Town hall

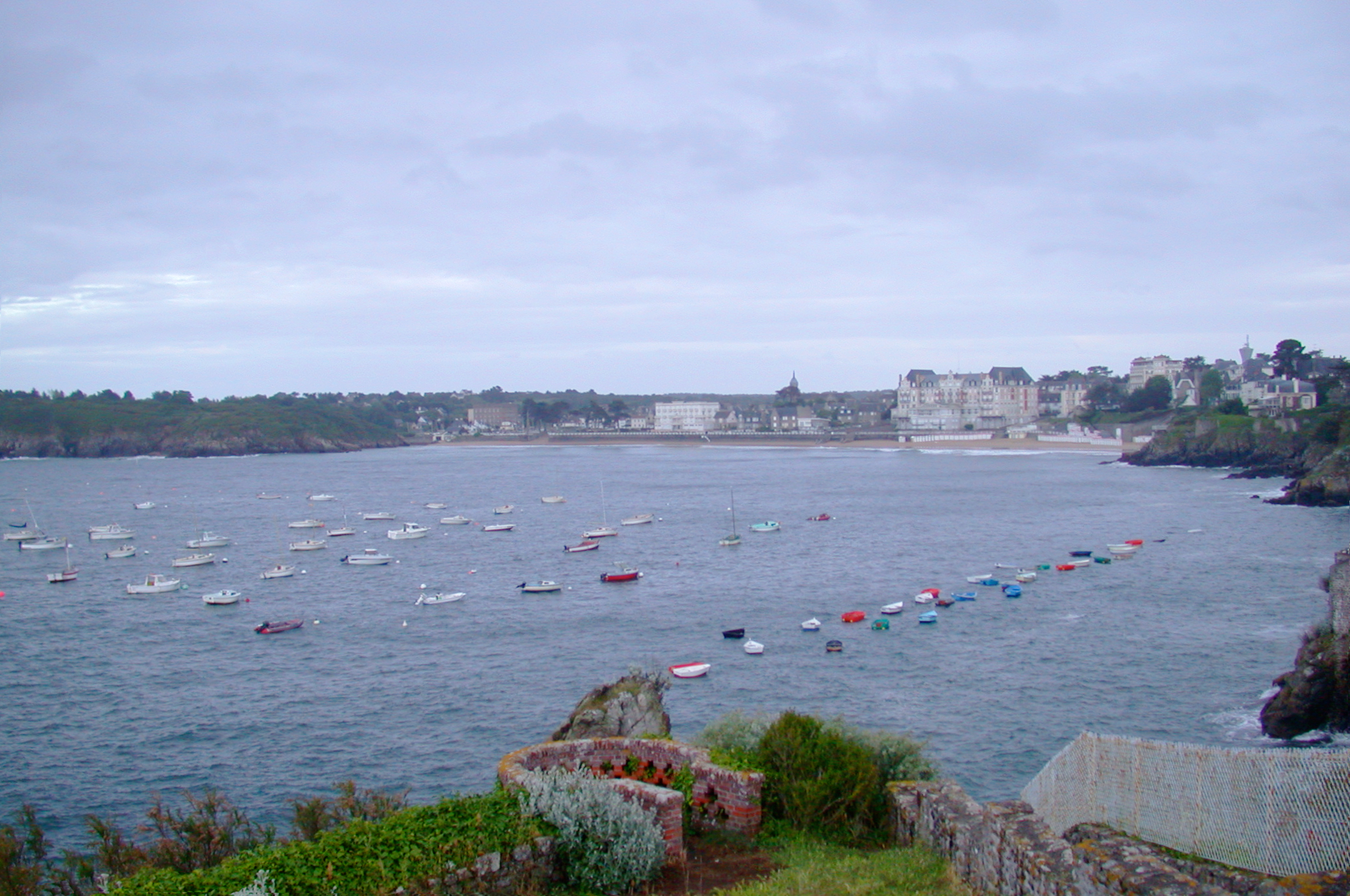
Grand'Plage and the town from the end of the Decolle peninsula

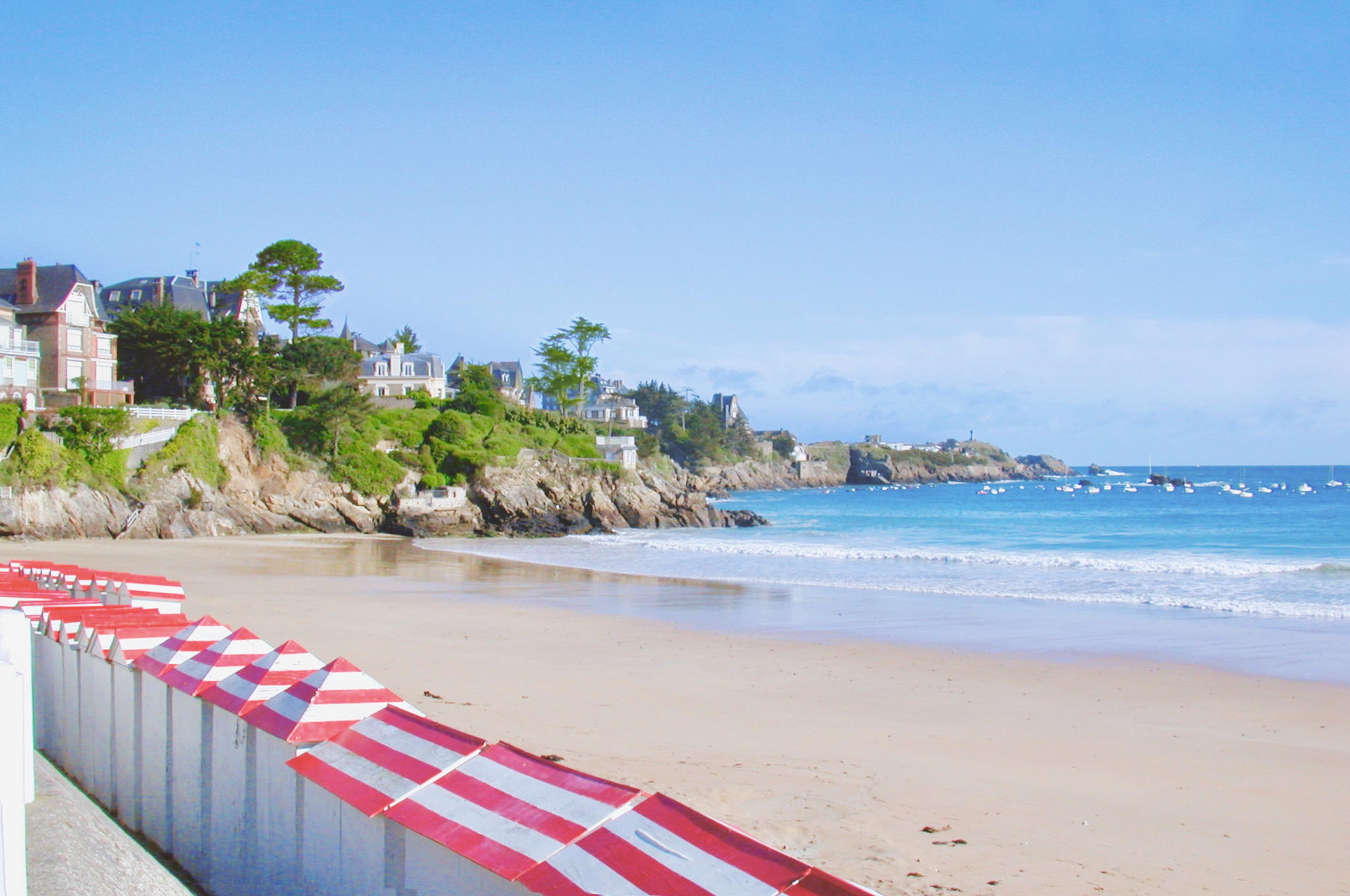
Decolle peninsula from Grand' Plage

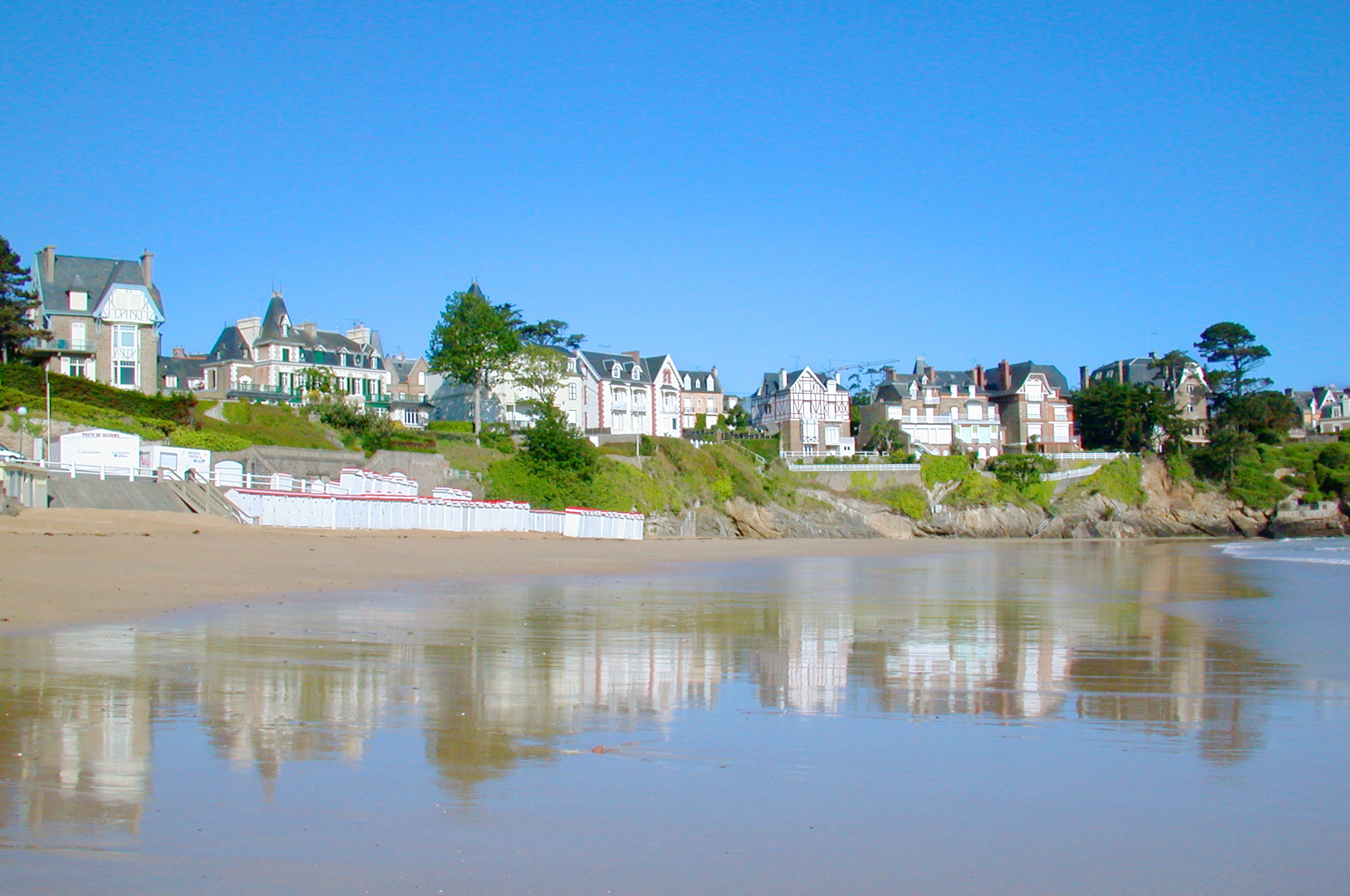
Beginning of 20th century villas on the Decolle from Grand' Plage

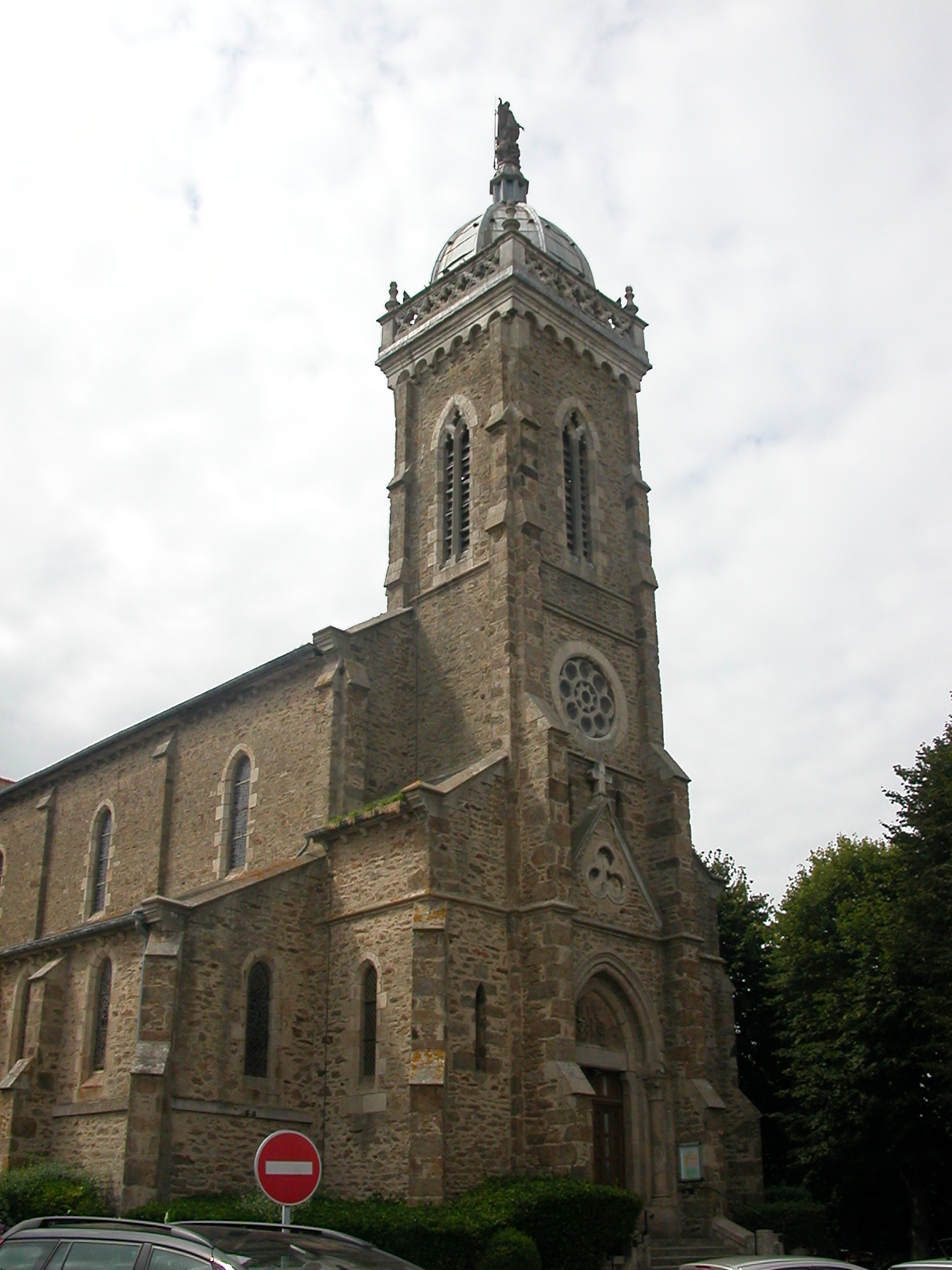
New church (19th century)

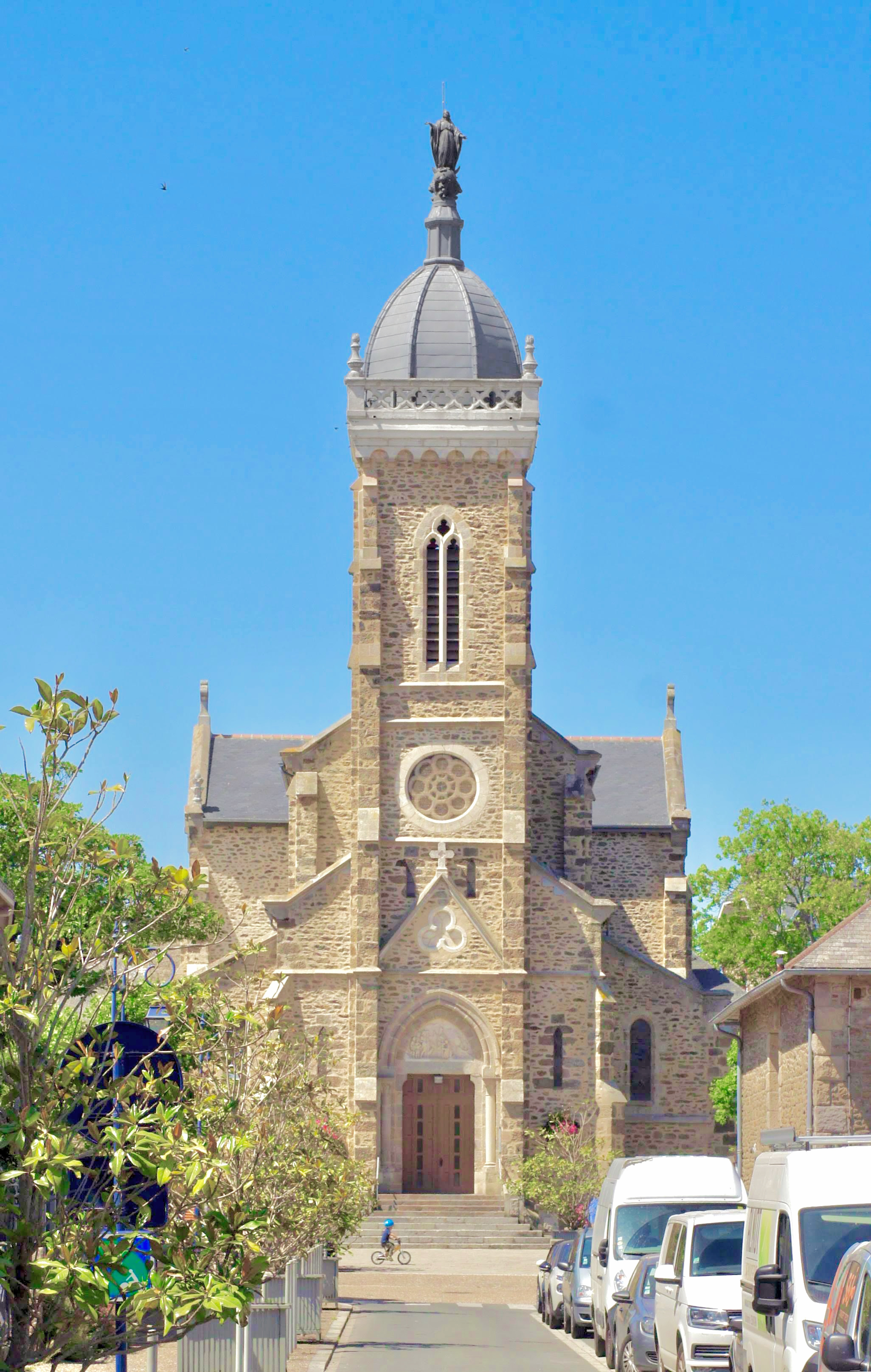
New church east side

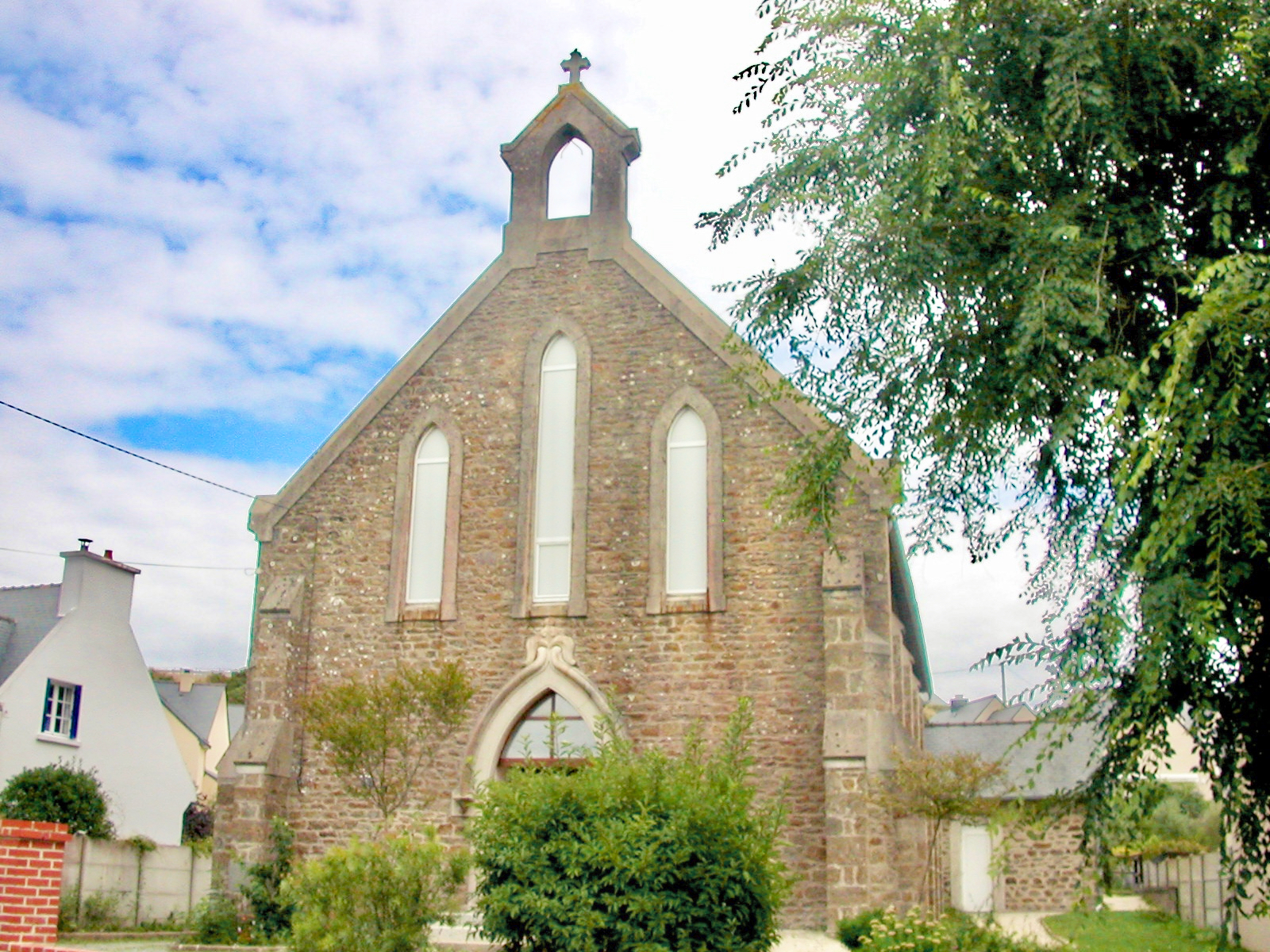
Protestant church(built by a local English resident, 20th century)

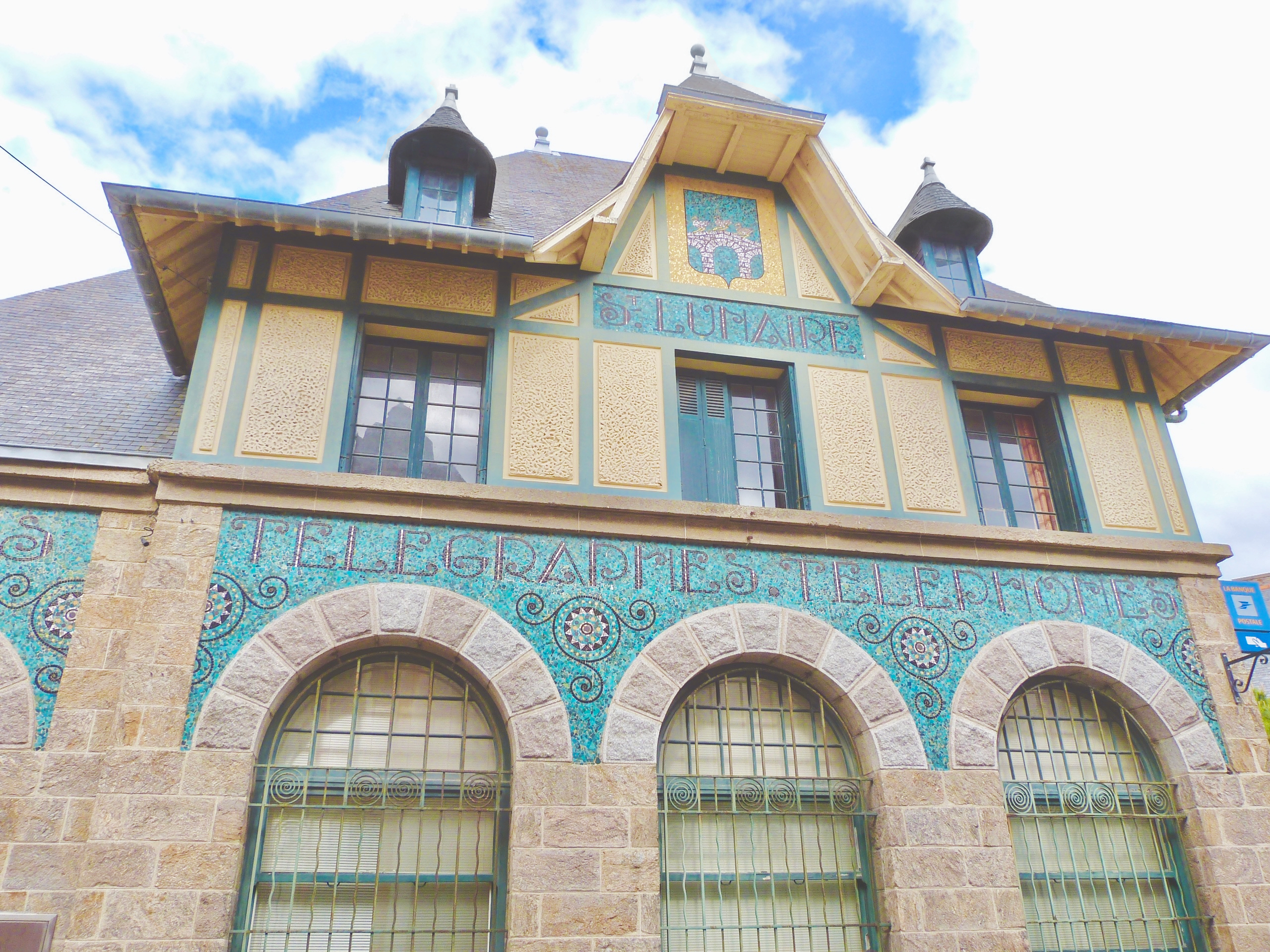
Post office facade with mosaic from Isidore Odorico

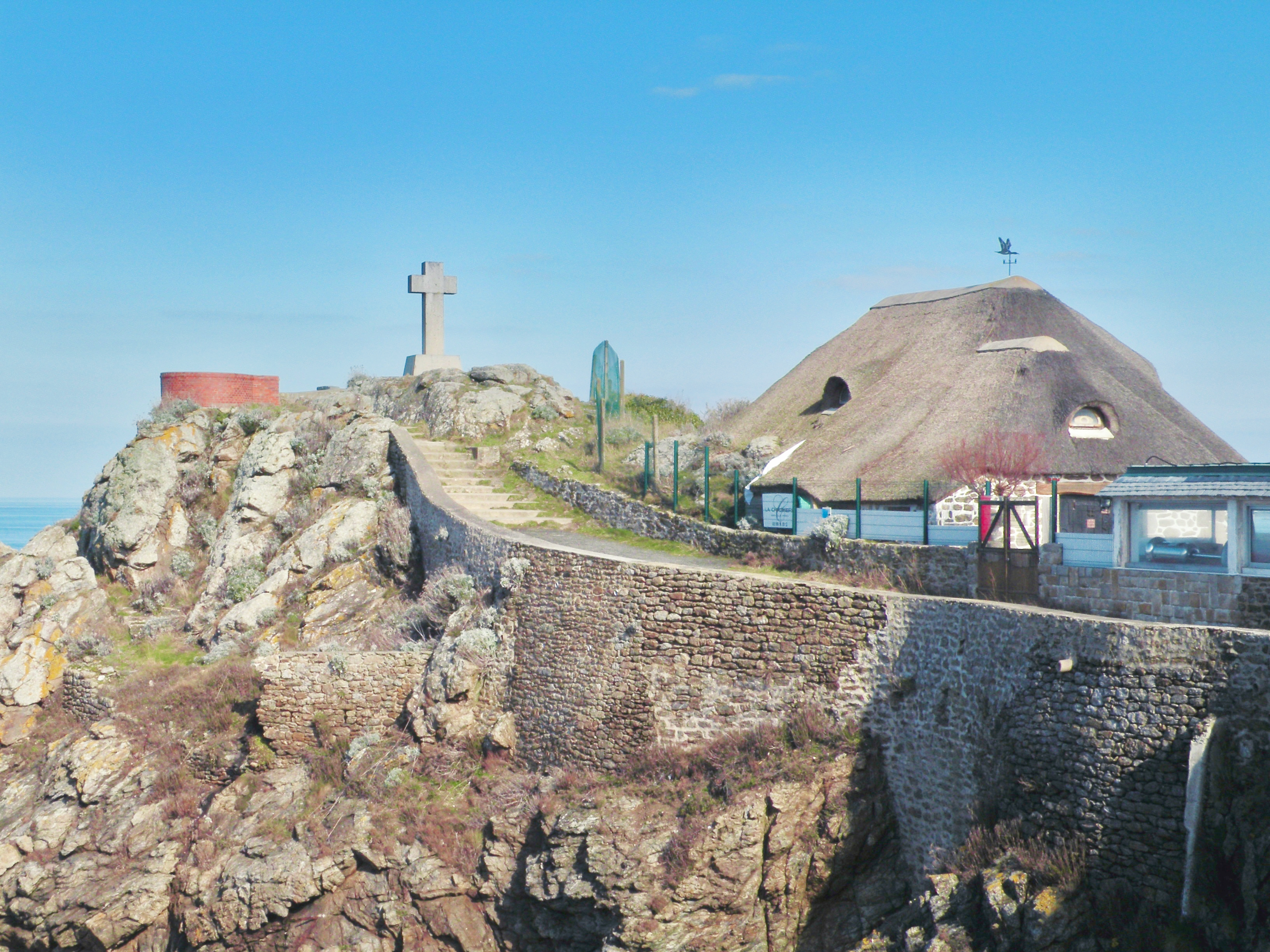
Decolle Peninsula

== Sports ==
=== Yacht Club ===
It was created in 1948. It offers sailing lessons (catamaran, windsurf, sailing dinghy) and also rowing lessons, during summer or the whole year. It is located on the Grand' Plage. The building has been renovated in 2016.

=== Tennis Club ===
It was created in 1907 by Sylla Laraque, a Haitian millionaire. It is made up of 7 clay courts, in the city center, next to the sea, and 2 interior clay courts.

=== Surf Schools ===
There are two surf clubs in Saint Lunaire, located on Longchamps beach:

- Bernik Surf Club
- Emeraude Surf School

=== Sports Complex Pol Le Breton ===
Saint Lunaire has a municipal complex for teams sports and racquet sports. A mezzanine allows the practice of gymnastics and yoga.

== International relations ==
Saint-Lunaire is twinned with:

- Hexham, United Kingdom

== See also ==
- Communes of the Ille-et-Vilaine department
