= Pleurtuit =

Pleurtuit Pleurestud (Breton)
- Commune
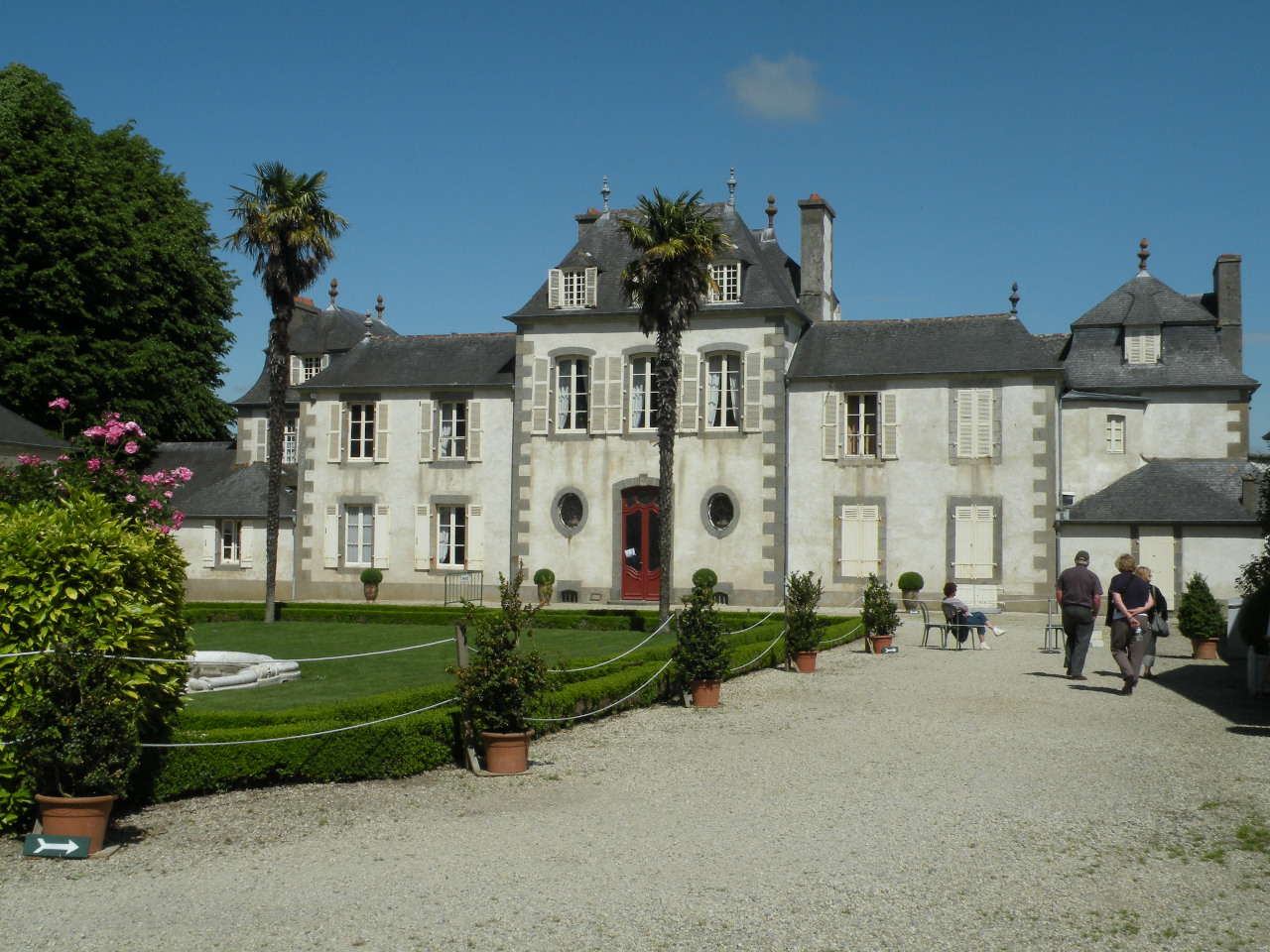
- Chateau of Montmarin

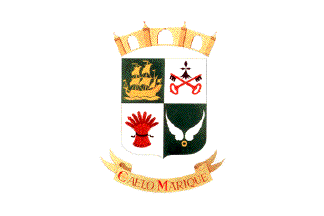
- Flag Coat of arms
- Location of Pleurtuit
- Location within France Location within Brittany
- Coordinates: 48°35′N 2°04′W
- Country: France
- Region: Brittany
- Department: Ille-et-Vilaine
- Arrondissement: Saint-Malo
- Canton: Saint-Malo-2
- Intercommunality: Côte d'Emeraude

Government
  - Mayor (2020–2026): Sophie Bezier
- Area^{1}: 29.67 km^{2} (11.46 sq mi)
- Highest elevation: 92 m (302 ft)
- Lowest elevation: 0 m (0 ft)
- Population (2023): 7,167
  - Density: 241.6/km^{2} (625.6/sq mi)
- Time zone: UTC+01:00 (CET)
  - Summer (DST): UTC+02:00 (CEST)
- INSEE/Postal code: 35228 /35730
- ^{1} French Land Register data, which excludes lakes, ponds, glaciers > 1 km^{2} (0.386 sq mi or 247 acres) and river estuaries.

Pleurtuit (French pronunciation: [plœʁtɥi]; Breton: Pleurestud) is a commune in the Ille-et-Vilaine department of Brittany in northwestern France.

== Population ==
Inhabitants of Pleurtuit are called in French pleurtuisiens.

Historical population
Year	Pop.	±% p.a.
1968	3,776	—
1975	3,764	−0.05%
1982	4,165	+1.46%
1990	4,428	+0.77%
1999	4,547	+0.30%
2007	5,455	+2.30%
2012	6,256	+2.78%
2017	6,806	+1.70%
2023	7,167	+0.87%
Source: INSEE

== See also ==
- Dinard–Pleurtuit–Saint-Malo Airport
- Communes of the Ille-et-Vilaine department
