= Saint-Ouen-la-Rouërie =

Saint-Ouen-la-Rouërie Sant-Owen-Reoger
- Part of Val-Couesnon
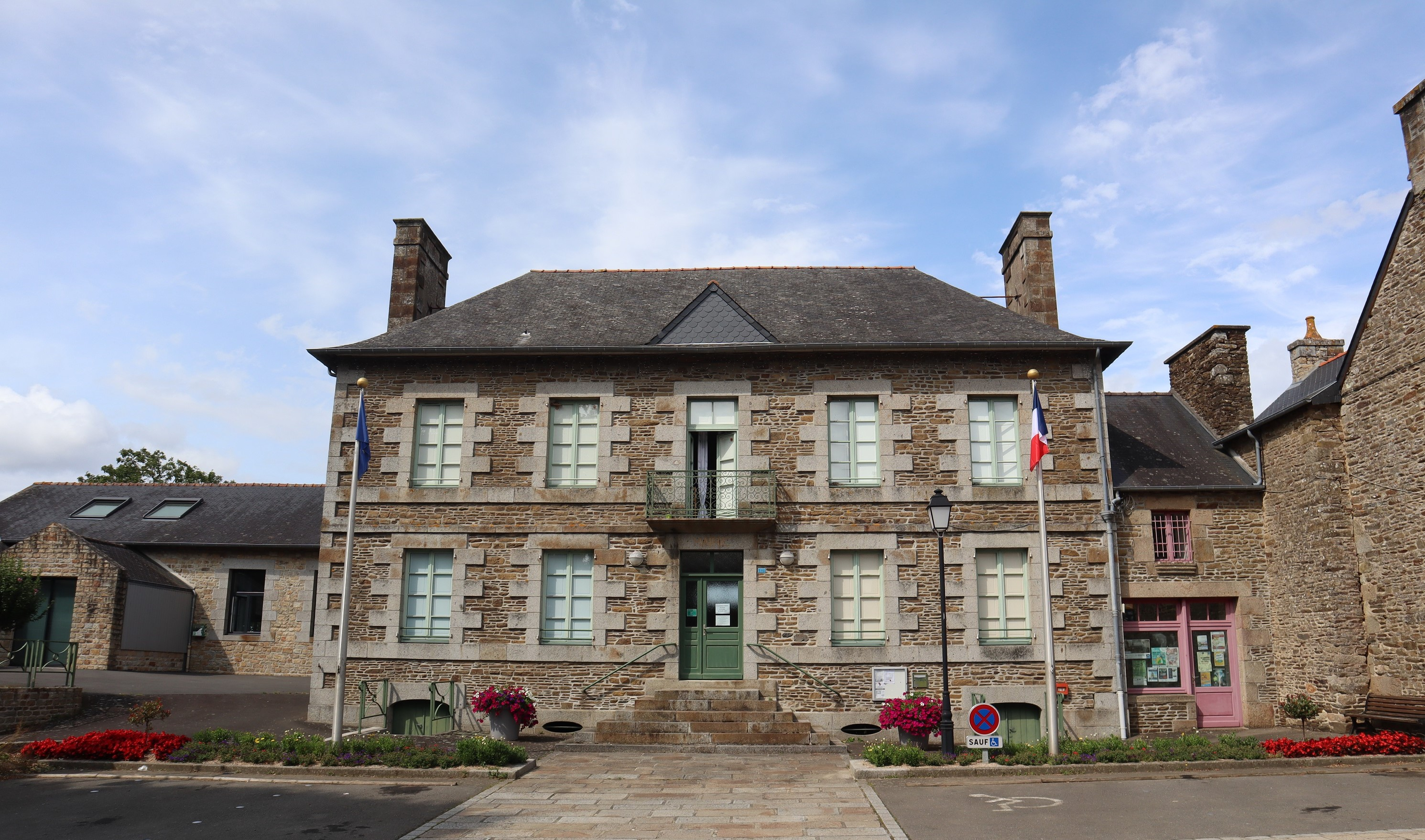
- The town hall of Saint-Ouen-La-Rouërie

- Coat of arms
- Location of Saint-Ouen-la-Rouërie
- Location within France Location within Brittany
- Coordinates: 48°27′49″N 1°26′23″W
- Country: France
- Region: Brittany
- Department: Ille-et-Vilaine
- Arrondissement: Fougères-Vitré
- Canton: Antrain
- Commune: Val-Couesnon
- Area^{1}: 21.12 km^{2} (8.15 sq mi)
- Elevation: 83 m (272 ft)
- Highest elevation: 114 m (374 ft)
- Lowest elevation: 12 m (39 ft)
- Population (2022): 823
  - Density: 39.0/km^{2} (101/sq mi)
- Time zone: UTC+01:00 (CET)
  - Summer (DST): UTC+02:00 (CEST)
- Postal code: 35460
- ^{1} French Land Register data, which excludes lakes, ponds, glaciers > 1 km^{2} (0.386 sq mi or 247 acres) and river estuaries.

Saint-Ouen-la-Rouërie (French pronunciation: [sɛ̃.t‿wɛ̃ la ʁwɛʁi]; Breton: Sant-Owen-Reoger) is a former commune in the Ille-et-Vilaine department in Brittany in northwestern France. On 1 January 2019, it was merged into the new commune Val-Couesnon.

== Location ==
The commune lies 47 km (29 mi) northeast of Rennes and 21 km (13 mi) south of Mont Saint-Michel on the border with Normandy.

Saint-Ouen's adjoining communes are Sacey and Montanel in Manche, and Coglès, Tremblay, and Antrain, in Ille-et-Vilaine.

== Population ==
Inhabitants of Saint-Ouen-la-Rouërie are called audoniens in French.

Historical population

Year	Pop.	±% p.a.
1793	1,972	—
1821	1,500	−0.97%
1846	2,105	+1.36%
1872	1,973	−0.25%
1901	1,630	−0.66%
1926	1,306	−0.88%
1946	1,276	−0.12%
1962	1,186	−0.46%

Year	Pop.	±% p.a.
1968	1,046	−2.07%
1975	950	−1.37%
1982	836	−1.81%
1990	783	−0.82%
1999	751	−0.46%
2006	786	+0.65%
2022	823	+0.29%

Source: EHESS and INSEE

== Sights ==
- The 18th-century Château de la Rouërie

== See also ==
- Communes of the Ille-et-Vilaine department
