= Tielen =

- Village
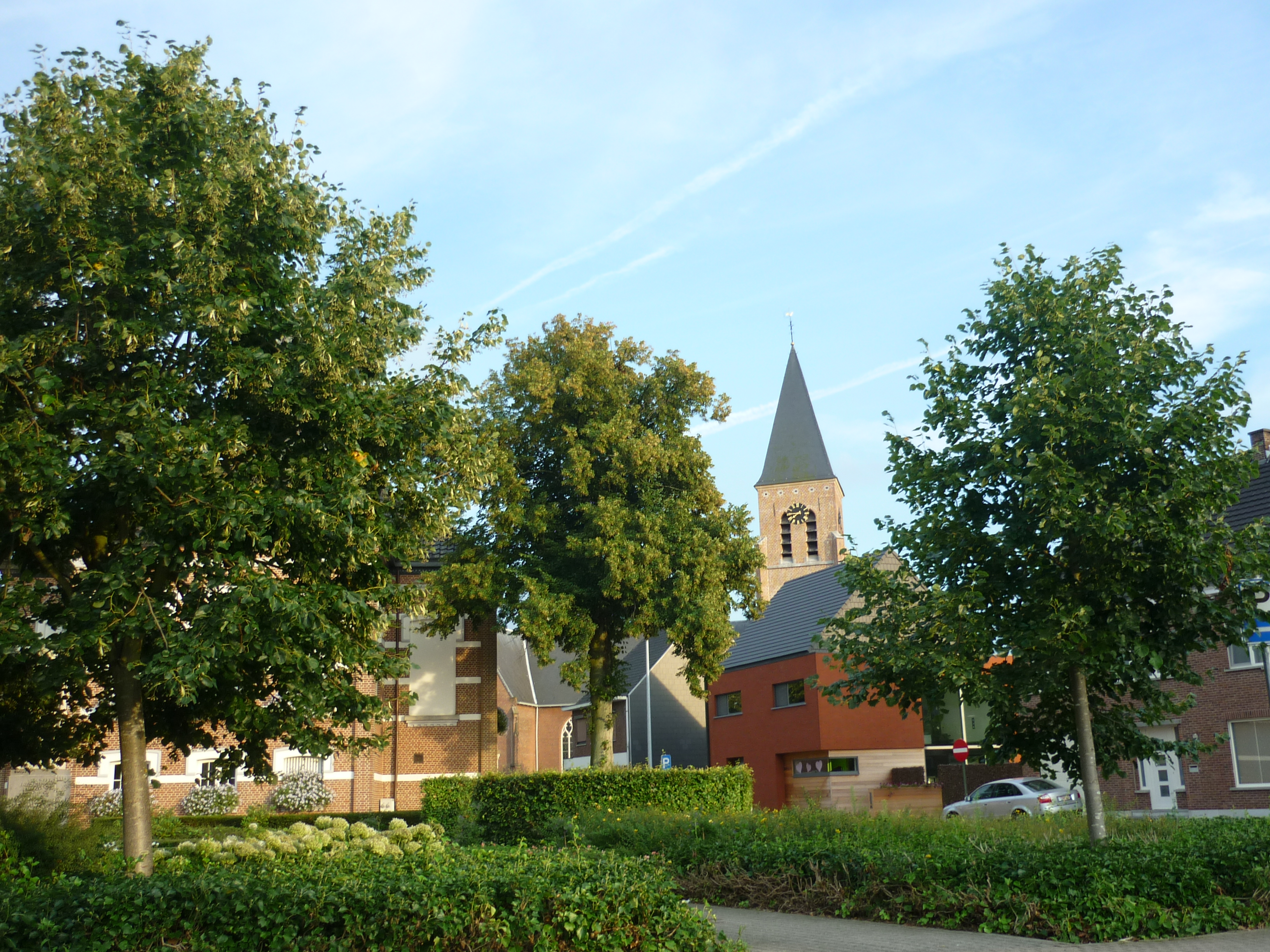
- View on the village centre

- Location in Belgium
- Coordinates: 51°14′N 4°53′E
- Country: Belgium
- Region: Flemish Region
- Province: Antwerp
- Municipality: Kasterlee

Area
  - Total: 14.42 km^{2} (5.57 sq mi)

Population (2021)
  - Total: 4,060
  - Density: 282/km^{2} (729/sq mi)
- Time zone: CET

Tielen is a village in the province of Antwerp in Flanders, Belgium. It is part of the municipality of Kasterlee. The nearest city is the neighbouring city of Turnhout. Other neighbouring towns are Vosselaar, Lichtaart, Poederlee, Lille and Gierle.

The borders of Tielen are marked by two rivers: The Aa and the Kaliebeek. Almost one third of the village is still covered with pine-woods, heath and swamps. Typical for the Kempen area.

The rest of this 1,371-hectare (5.29 sq mi) village is mostly used for residential and agricultural purposes.

== Inhabitants ==
With not more than 3,900 inhabitants (3886 - 2009-01-01), Tielen still has a strong community even though in the last 50 years urbanization has doubled the population as shown below.

=== Evolution of habitation ===
19th century
Year	1806	1816	1830	1846	1856	1866	1876	1880	1890
Number of inhabitants	852	772	860	973	1010	1008	1010	1009	1014
Remarks:results on 31/12

20th century until unitement of municipalities
Year	1900	1910	1920	1930	1947	1961	1970	1976
Number of inhabitants	1057	1186	1328	1548	1984	2507	2854	2936
Remarks:results on 31/12

The largest part of the inhabitants are upper middle class nowadays, but through history, the largest part of the inhabitants were poor farmers.

The most famous inhabitant of Tielen was Baron Flor Peeters (an important organist). Less famous is the bishop of Ghent Lucas Van Looy.

== Sights ==
The village has a small center which is triangular. It has a 19th-century church, an old railway station and a beautiful town hall (nowadays the old town hall, since Tielen became a part of Kasterlee in 1977).

Other important buildings in Tielen are the 12th century watermill and the 15th-century castle (Tielenhof), which was the home of the lords of Tielen and its neighbouring village Gierle until the French Revolution.

People visit this village to go walking or bike-riding in nature and to enjoy the countryside.

Tielen is a village with local pubs or bars and regular events of all sorts.

Tielen only has one factory; "Het IJsboerke" (The Ice Farmer) manufactures ice cream and is the second biggest ice cream producer in Belgium.

== History ==
The name "Tielen" no longer has a meaning in modern-day Dutch (or Flemish) and it is not sure what it means. It could mean "a moist swampy area covered with small plants", "a river lock" or even "a row of houses next to a river"

There's no real date to point out the foundation of Tielen. The oldest documents mentioning the village are from the 13th century, but most historians think the village is actually much older. The characteristics of the oldest settlements prove the village was founded by the Franks when they colonized the area. Yet an even earlier settlement could be located where the castle of Tielen stands today.

In 1597 there was a battle in Tielen. It was called 'The battle near Turnhout' or 'The battle on Tielenheide', this battle was between The Northern Netherlands and the Spanish occupier of The Southern Netherlands, nowadays where we situate Belgium.

The first years after World War II, the British Army had a military base in the village, in the surrounding villages people referred to Tielen as 'Little Britain'. This of course ended when the Belgian 3PARA took over the base.

In 1977, Tielen had not enough inhabitants to remain an independent municipality. It was fused into a larger municipality together with Kasterlee and Lichtaart.

== Accessibility ==
There's a railway station in Tielen and it has direct connections with Turnhout, Antwerp and Brussels.

The village is near the E34 highway and has several bus connections.

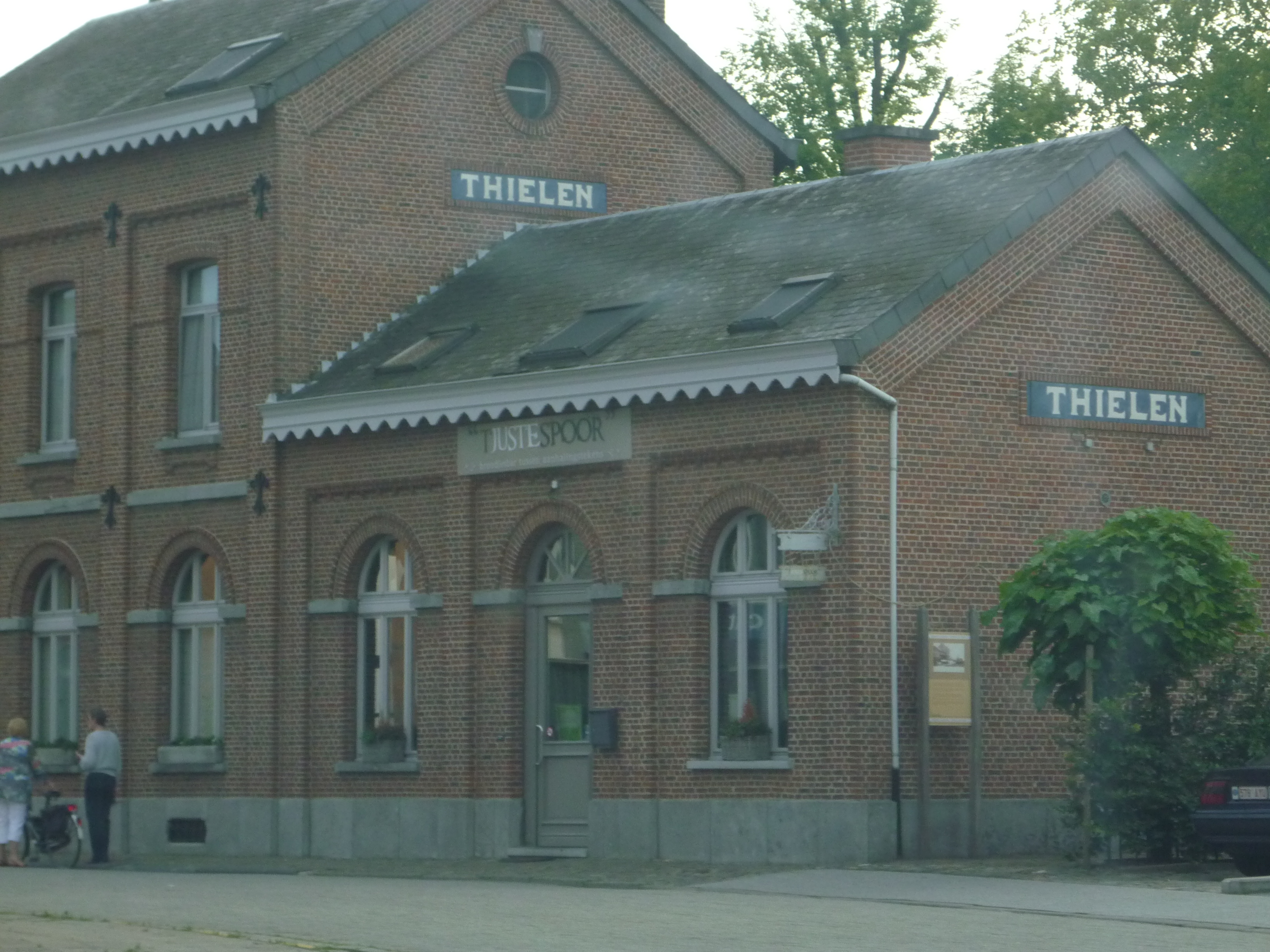
Railway Station Tielen(street side)
