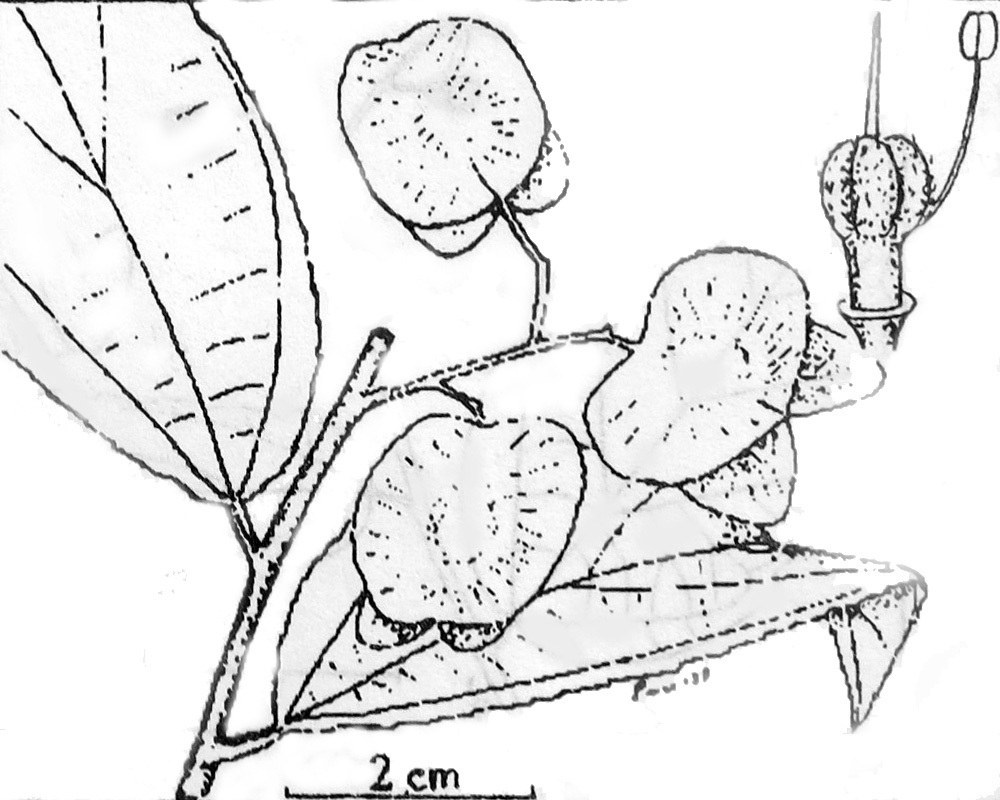
- Leaves, fruit & flower: Pierre's original drawing

Scientific classification
- Kingdom: Plantae
- Clade: Tracheophytes
- Clade: Angiosperms
- Clade: Eudicots
- Clade: Rosids
- Order: Malvales
- Family: Malvaceae
- Genus: Colona
- Species: C. evecta

Binomial name
- Colona evecta (Pierre) Burret

Synonyms
- Columbia evecta Pierre

= Colona evecta =

Species of flowering plant

Colona evecta is a tree species, first described by Pierre, in the genus Colona and now placed in the subfamily Grewioideae. No subspecies are listed in the Catalogue of Life.

== Nomenclature ==
The current name Colona evecta appears to have been coined by Burret, but most Vietnamese texts refer to C. evecta (Pierre) Gagnep. However this is probably a nomen superfluum: Burret (1926) and Gagnepain independently transferring the species from one genus to the other. Gagnepain's 1943 paper is now available online (page 67), and does not mention this species. At the time of writing (2017) the Plant List refers to C. erecta (Pierre) Burret as an accepted name with 8 accessions in the Kew Herbarium catalogue also under the latter name .

The Vietnamese name is chàm ron (sometimes bồ an is used, but this is better applied to C. auriculata); in Khmer it is töngoor.

== Description ==
Colona evecta was described from southern Vietnam, it is also found in neighbouring provinces of Cambodia, where the species often survives forest clearing. The tree grows from 6-20m, with radiating pubescent branches and terminal flowers. The bark of young trees is very tough. The leaves are relatively thick, lanceolate, denticulate, glossy on upper sides, with 5–7 mm petioles. The pods have 3–4 wings and are approximately 20–25 mm; the seeds are 6–7 mm.
