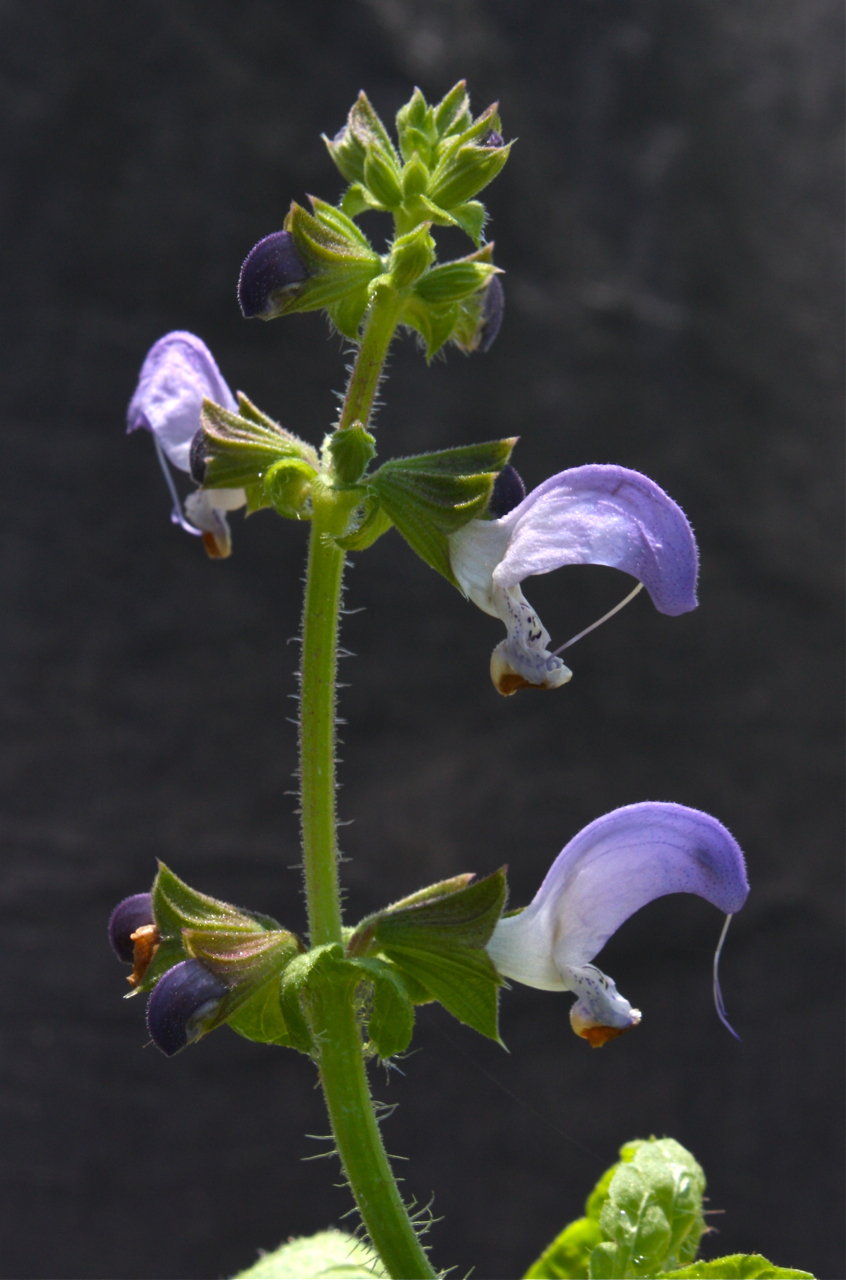

Scientific classification
- Kingdom: Plantae
- Clade: Tracheophytes
- Clade: Angiosperms
- Clade: Eudicots
- Clade: Asterids
- Order: Lamiales
- Family: Lamiaceae
- Genus: Salvia
- Species: S. algeriensis

Binomial name
- Salvia algeriensis Desf.

= Salvia algeriensis =

Species of flowering plant

Salvia algeriensis is an annual Salvia native to northeast Morocco and northwest Algeria, found growing at up to 600 m (2,000 ft) elevation. In its native habitat, it grows nearly 1 m (3.3 ft) in height (it is much shorter in cultivation), with bright green ovate leaves about 8 cm (3.1 in) long and wide. Each plant produces 3–4 inflorescences up to 15 cm (5.9 in) long, with light violet flowers that have violet specks on the lower lip. The plant has a light scent when crushed, similar to thyme.
