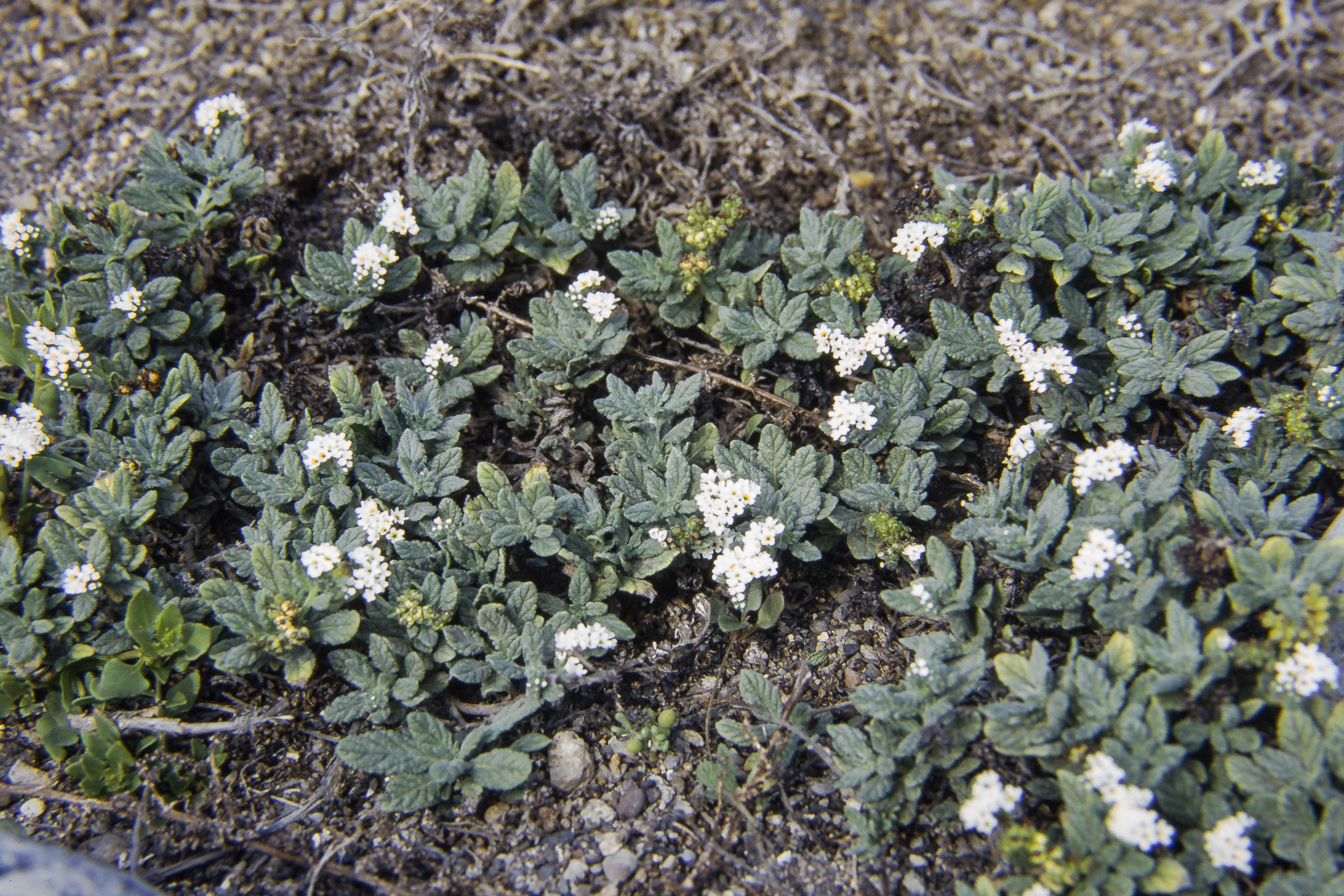
- In habitat on the seashore, Tenerife

Scientific classification
- Kingdom: Plantae
- Clade: Tracheophytes
- Clade: Angiosperms
- Clade: Eudicots
- Clade: Asterids
- Order: Boraginales
- Family: Heliotropiaceae
- Genus: Heliotropium
- Species: H. crispum

Binomial name
- Heliotropium crispum Desf.

Synonyms
- Bourjotia kralikii Pomel; Heliophytum erosum (Lehm.) DC.; Heliotropium bacciferum var. erosum (Lehm.) Hadidy; Heliotropium canariense Willd. ex Schult.; Heliotropium erosum Lehm.; Heliotropium kralikii Pomel; Heliotropium maroccanum Lehm.; Heliotropium plebeium Banks ex Buch; Heliotropium suffruticescens Pomel

= Heliotropium crispum =

Species of plant

Heliotropium crispum is a species of flowering plant in the family Heliotropiaceae. It is native to western Africa (including the Canary Islands), Egypt, Sudan, south-western Asia, and Pakistan. It was first described by René Louiche Desfontaines.

== Description ==
Heliotropium crispum is a very variable annual or perennial herbaceous plant. It has greyish leaves and dense cymes of small white flowers.

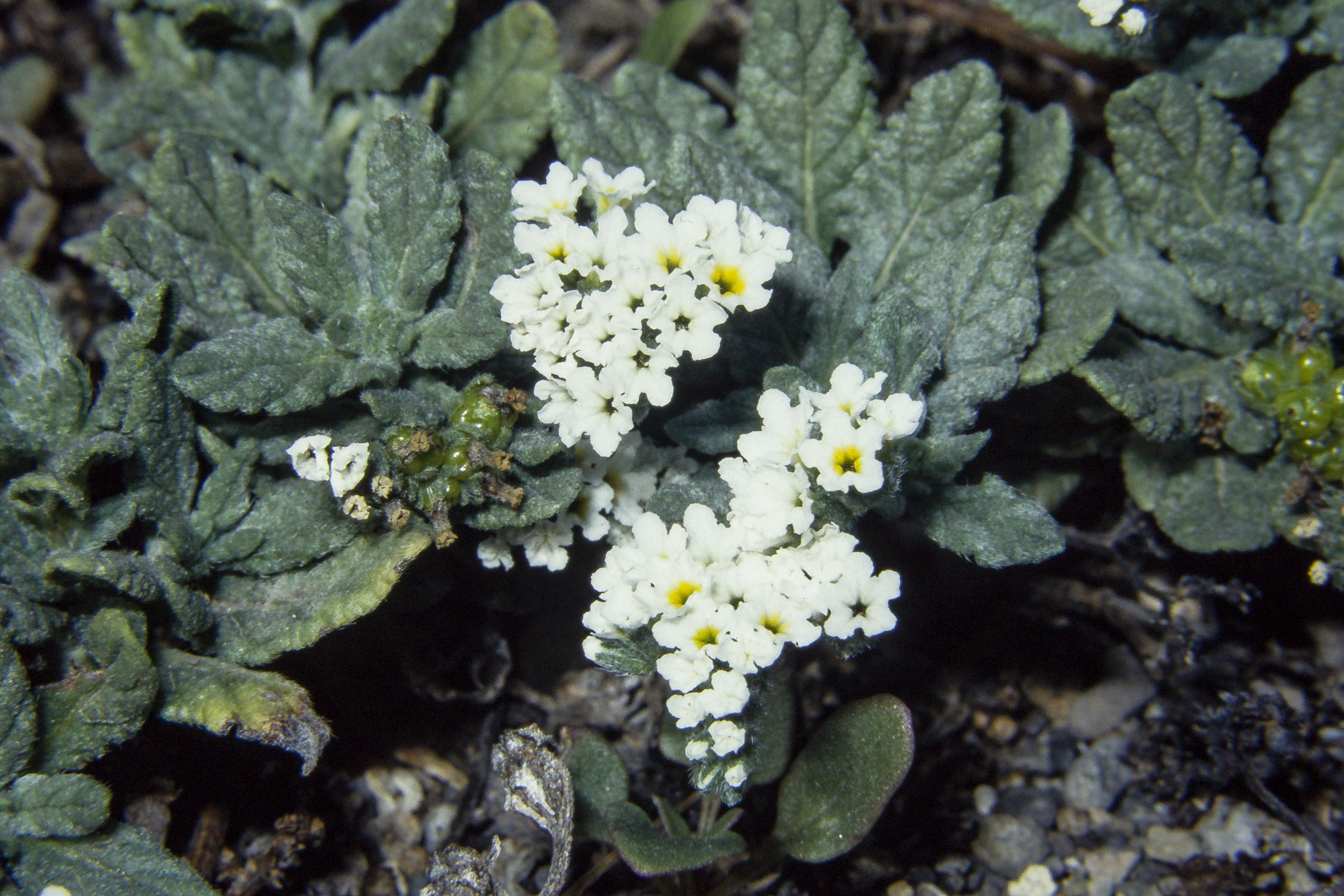
Flowers

== Distribution and habitat ==
Heliotropium crispum is native to western Africa, from the Canary Islands, Mauritania and Senegal to Nigeria, Egypt and Sudan, and to Saudi Arabia, Afghanistan and Pakistan. In the Canary Islands, it is found on dry (leeward) southern or western slopes of all the islands.
