= Jean Langlais =

French composer (1907–1991)

- Born: Jean François-Hyacinthe Langlais III; February 15, 1907; La Fontenelle, Ille-et-Vilaine
- Died: May 8, 1991 (aged 84); Paris, France
- Occupation: Composer
- Style: Classical music

Jean François-Hyacinthe Langlais III (Note: Langlais's full name is erroneously misstated to be "Jean Marie Hyacinthe Langlais" by some sources. However, his birth certificate records the forenames Jean François Hyacinthe. The mistake stems from an error stated in the book Jean Langlais: A Bio-Bibliography.) (15 February 1907 – 8 May 1991) was a French composer of modern classical music, organist, and improviser. He described himself as "Breton, de foi Catholique" ("Breton, of Catholic faith").

== Biography ==
Langlais was born in La Fontenelle (Ille-et-Vilaine, Brittany), a small village near Mont Saint-Michel, France to Jean-Marie-Joseph Langlais II, a blacksmith and Flavie Canto, a seamstress. Langlais became blind due to glaucoma when he was only two years old and was sent to the Institut National des Jeunes Aveugles (National Institute for Blind Children) in Paris, where he began to study the organ, with André Marchal. From there he progressed to the Paris Conservatoire, obtaining prizes in organ and studying composition with Marcel Dupré and Paul Dukas. He also studied improvisation with Charles Tournemire.

After graduating, Langlais returned to the National Institute for Blind Children to teach, and also taught at the Schola Cantorum in Paris from 1961 to 1976. Many of his students went on to become important musicians, including organists and composers; among them was the American Kathleen Thomerson, who later published a bio-bibliography about him. Another was Margreeth Chr. de Jong, a Dutch organist, composer and music educator.

His first wife Jeannette asked his former student, personal recital liaison and friend Ann Labounsky in 1972 to write Langlais's biography Jean Langlais the Man and His Music, though it was not published until 2000; nine years after Langlais's death. Labounsky did her doctoral paper in 1991 on the life and works of Langlais and fortunately she was able to share some of it with Langlais before he died. However Langlais was displeased, as Labounsky was truthful in what she saw, whereas Langlais wanted to be painted in the way he saw as the truth. Labounsky admitted that at times Langlais could be a complex person, but Langlais did not see himself this way. This was partly due to the region of Brittany in which he grew up as the Bretons considered themselves to be a proud people who loved to tell folklore.

It was as an organist that Langlais made his name, following in the footsteps of César Franck and Charles Tournemire as organiste titulaire at the Basilica of Sainte-Clotilde in Paris in 1945, a post in which he remained until 1988. He was much in demand as a concert organist, and widely toured across Europe and the United States. His 3rd North American tour lasted from January through March 1956, and saw him play on both coasts.

Langlais died in the 15th arrondissement of Paris at the age of 84, and was survived by his second wife Marie-Louise Jaquet-Langlais and three children, Janine, Claude and Caroline. The position of organist at Sainte-Clotilde was succeeded to by Jacques Taddei.

== Music ==
Langlais was a prolific composer, composing 254 works with opus numbers, the first of which was his Prelude and Fugue for organ (1927), and the last his Trio (1990), another organ piece. Although best known as a composer of organ music and sacred choral music, he also composed a number of instrumental, orchestral and chamber works and some secular song settings.

Langlais's music is written in a highly individual eclectic style, venturing well beyond what might be expected of mid-twentieth-century French music, with rich and complex harmonies and overlapping modes, sometimes more tonal than his contemporary, friend and countryman Olivier Messiaen, sometimes related to his two predecessors at Sainte-Clotilde, Franck and Tournemire, but sometimes also employing serial techniques and often exhibiting an earthy, Celtic folkiness which owes not a little to Bartók.

Owing to his blindness, Langlais's method of composition involved him thinking about the work in every detail over a long period, and only then writing it down in shorthand Braille. He would then dictate each note and its rhythmic value to an amanuensis (often his first wife Jeannette) to produce the full score.

His best-known works include his four-part masses, Messe solennelle and Missa Salve Regina, his Missa in simplicitate for unison voice and organ, and his many organ compositions, including:

- Hymne d'actions de grâces from Three Gregorian Paraphrases
- La nativité and Les rameaux (The Palms) (Poèmes Evangeliques)
- Chant héroïque, Chant de paix, and De profundis from Nine Pieces
- Kyrie "Orbis factor" from Livre œcuménique
- Incantation pour un jour saint (Incantation for Easter)
- Cantilène (Suite brève)
- Suite médiévale
- Folkloric Suite
- Trois méditations sur la Sainte Trinité
- Fête, Op. 51
- 24 Pieces for harmonium or organ, Op. 6
- Hommage à Frescobaldi

== Discography ==
=== Albums ===
- Langlais joue Langlais, 1976
- Missa Salve Regina; Messe solennelle, (English Chamber Orchestra Brass Ensemble; The Choir of Westminster Cathedral/David Hill), 1988
- Jean Langlais Live, St. Augustin, Wien, 1993
- Organ works (Kevin Bowyer), 1994
- Messe solennelle - Missa in Simplicitate - Missa Misericordiae Domini – Ensemble Vocal Jean Sourisse, dir. Jean Sourisse, 1996
- Suite Médiévale / Cinq Méditations sur l'Apocalypse, 1996
- The complete organ works of César Franck on the organ of the Basilica of Sainte Clotilde, Paris (1963) [2 CD], 1996
- Chants de Bretagne [Andréa Ar Gouilh voix – Jacques Kauffmann, orgue, Orgue Cavaillé-Coll de Saint-Servan], 1997
- Musique de chambre avec piano, 2001
- Un centenaire (George Baker, organ), 2007

=== DVDs ===
- Life and Music of Jean Langlais, 2007, Los Angeles chapter of the American Guild of Organists.

== Bibliography ==
- Langlais Marie-Louise (2016), Jean Langlais remembered, free online, ml-langlais.com and agohq.org
- Labounsky, A (2000). Jean Langlais: The Man and His Music. Amadeus Press. ISBN 1-57467-054-9.
- Jaquet-Langlais, M-L. (1995), Ombre et Lumière : Jean Langlais 1907-1991, Paris: Éditions Combre, ISBN 2-9506073-2-2
- Thomerson, K. (1988), Jean Langlais: A Bio-Bibliography, Greenwood (Bio-Bibliographies in Music: Book 10), ISBN 978-0313255472
