= List of compositions by Jean Langlais =

This is a list of compositions by Jean Langlais. Langlais was a prolific composer, composing 254 works with opus numbers.

== Opus list ==
| Opus | Title |
|---|---|
| 1 | Prélude et Fugue |
| 2 | Adoration des bergers |
| 3 | O Salutaris hostia |
| 4 | Thème libre |
| 5 | Trois Paraphrases Gregoriannes |
| 6 | 24 Pieces for harmonium or organ |
| 7 | Poèmes Évangeliques |
| 8 | Cinq motets |
| 9 | Trois Paraphrases Grégoriennes |
| 10 | |
| 11 | |
| 12 | |
| 13 | |
| 14 | Suite pour piano à quatre-mains |
| 15 | Trio, pour flute violon et alto |
| 16 | |
| 17 | |
| 18 | Pièces en forme libre, pour orgue et orchestre |
| 19 | Messe d'Escalquens |
| 20 | Symphonie (Suite) concertante, pour cello et orchestre |
| 21 | Symphonie (Suite) concertante, pour piano et orchestre |
| 22 | |
| 23 | Mouvement perpétuel, pour piano |
| 24 | |
| 25 | Légende de Saint-Nicolas |
| 26 | |
| 27 | Deux Psaumes |
| 28 | Thème, variation et final, pour orgue et orchestre |
| 29 | Choral médiéval, pour 3 trompettes, 3 trombones et orgue |
| 30 | |
| 31 | Suite Armoricaine, pour piano |
| 32 | |
| 33 | Suite bretonne |
| 34 | |
| 35 | |
| 36 | O salutaris, pour 2 voix et orgue |
| 37 | Première symphonie, pour orgue |
| 38 | |
| 39 | Deux pièces, pour flûte et piano |
| 40 | Neuf pièces, pour orgue |
| 41 | Miserere mei |
| 42 | Deux offertoires pour tous les temps sur des textes grégoriens, pour orgue |
| 43 | |
| 44 | |
| 45 | Oremus pro pontifice, pour 2 voix et orgue |
| 46 | |
| 47 | Suite |
| 48 | |
| 49 | Cantate à Saint-Vincent |
| 50 | |
| 51 | Fête, pour orgue |
| 52 | |
| 53 | Cantate en l'Honneur de Saint-Louis Marie de Monfort |
| 54 | Suite Brève, pour orgue |
| 55 | |
| 56 | Suite médievale en forme de messe basse, pour orgue |
| 57 | |
| 58 | |
| 59 | Suite Française, pour orgue |
| 60 | |
| 61 | Première concerto, pour orgue (clavecin) et orchestre |
| 62 | Libera me Domine |
| 63 | |
| 64 | Incantation pour un jour saint - Dominica in palmis, pour orgue |
| 65 | Trois prières |
| 66 | |
| 67 | Messe Solennelle |
| 68 | |
| 69 | Four Postludes, for organ |
| 70 | Hommage à Frescobaldi, pour orgue |
| 71 | |
| 72 | |
| 73 | |
| 74 | |
| 75 | Messe en style ancien |
| 76 | |
| 77 | Folkloric suite, for organ |
| 78 | |
| 79 | |
| 80 | |
| 81 | Missa Salve Regina |
| 82 | |
| 83 | Deux petites pièces dans le style médiéval Dominica in palmis, pour orgue |
| 84 | |
| 85 | |
| 86 | 5 Mélodies, pour voix et piano |
| 87 | |
| 88 | |
| 89 | |
| 90 | Huit pièces modales, pour orgue |
| 91 | Organ Book |
| 92 | Cantique eucharistique |
| 93 | |
| 94 | Prélude à la messe "Orbis factor", pour orgue |
| 95 | Triptyque, pour orgue |
| 96 | Three characteristic pieces, for organ |
| 97 | Ave Maris Stella, Office pour la Sainte Famille, pour orgue |
| 98 | In Festo SS, Trinitatis, pour orgue |
| 99 | La Passion |
| 100 | |
| 101 | |
| 102 | |
| 103 | |
| 104 | Venite et audite, pour chœur |
| 105 | Missa Misericordiae Domini |
| 106 | Mass XVI (Ordinary Ferial Days) |
| 107 | Deo gratias, Messe XVI et XVIII |
| 108 | Miniature, for organ |
| 109 | |
| 110 | |
| 111 | American Suite |
| 112 | |
| 113 | |
| 114 | Deux petites pièces dans le style médiéval |
| 115 | |
| 116 | |
| 117 | |
| 118 | |
| 119 | |
| 120 | |
| 121 | |
| 122 | Deuxième concerto, pour orgue et orchestre |
| 123 | Ave Maria stella |
| 124 | |
| 125 | |
| 126 | |
| 127 | |
| 128 | Essai, pour orgue |
| 129 | Trois méditations sur la Sainte-Trinité, pour orgue |
| 130 | Dix versets dans les modes grégoriens |
| 131 | Offertoire pour l'office de Sainte-Claire, motet à 3 voix égales |
| 132 | |
| 133 | |
| 134 | Hommage à Rameau (Ostinato - Méditation - Evocation), pour orgue |
| 135 | |
| 136 | |
| 137 | Prelude on Coronation, for organ |
| 138 | |
| 139 | |
| 140 | |
| 141 | |
| 142 | |
| 143 | Psaeume Solennel |
| 144 | Messe "Dieu prends pitié" |
| 145 | |
| 146 | Poem of life, for organ |
| 147 | |
| 148 | |
| 149 | |
| 150 | |
| 151 | Messe "Joie sur terre" |
| 152 | Poem of peace, for organ |
| 153 | Poem of happiness, for organ |
| 154 | Carillon (Bells), pour carrillon |
| 155 | Sonate en trio, pour orgue |
| 156 | |
| 157 | Livre oecuménique, pour orgue |
| 158 | Deux pièces (Adoration - Prélude dans le style ancien), pour orgue |
| 159 | |
| 160 | Missa Orbis Factor |
| 161 | Huit chants de Bretagne, pour orgue |
| 162 | Cortège, pour 2 orgues, 4 trompettes, 4 trombones et timbales ad libitum |
| 163 | |
| 164 | |
| 165 | Trois Implorations (Pour la Joie - Pour l'Indulgence - Pour la Croyance), pour orgue |
| 166 | Troisième concerto, pour orgue et orchestre |
| 167 | Cinq chorals, pour orgue |
| 168 | Pièce pour trompette et orgue |
| 169 | Offrande à Marie, pour orgue |
| 170 | Supplication, pour orgue |
| 171 | |
| 172 | Petits préludes sur deux thèmes grégoriens, pour orgue |
| 173 | |
| 174 | Trois oraisons |
| 175 | Cinq méditations sur l'Apocalypse, pour orgue |
| 176 | Suite baroque, pour orgue |
| 177 | |
| 178 | Plein-jeu à la française, pour orgue |
| 179 | Diptyque, pour orgue et piano |
| 180 | Cinq pièces pour violin et orgue |
| 181 | Huit chants de Bretagne, pour orgue |
| 182 | |
| 183 | Celebration, pour orgue |
| 184 | Hommage à Louis Braille, pour orgue |
| 185 | Celebration, Quatre préludes, pour orgue |
| 186 | Trois esquisses romanes, pour orgue |
| 187 | Trois esquisses gothiques, pour orgue |
| 188 | |
| 189 | Six petites pièces, pour orgue |
| 190 | Mosaïque, vol. 1, pour orgue |
| 191 | Mosaïque, vol. 2, pour orgue |
| 192 | |
| 193 | Cantique en l'honneur d'Anne de Bretagne |
| 194 | |
| 195 | Deuxième Symphonie, "Alla Webern", pour orgue |
| 196 | Mosaïque, vol. 3, pour orgue |
| 197 | |
| 198 | |
| 199 | Triptyque grégorien, pour orgue |
| 200 | Progression, for organ |
| 201 | |
| 202 | |
| 203 | |
| 204 | Noëls avec variations, pour orgue |
| 205 | Prélude grégorien, pour orgue |
| 206 | Offrande à une âme, diptyque pour orgue |
| 207 | Troisième symphonie (American suite) |
| 208 | Corpus Christi |
| 209 | |
| 210 | |
| 211 | Rosace, pour orgue |
| 212 | Chant des bergers - Prière des mages, pour orgue |
| 213 | |
| 214 | |
| 215 | Prélude et allegro, pour orgue |
| 216 | |
| 217 | |
| 218 | Cinq soleils (Matin – Midi – Soir – Etoiles – France), pour orgue |
| 219 | Sept études de concert pour pédale, pour orgue |
| 220 | Deux pièces brèves, pour orgue |
| 221 | |
| 222 | |
| 223 | Miniature II, for organ |
| 224 | |
| 225 | Talitha koum (Résurrection), pour orgue |
| 226 | Trois pièces faciles (Libre – Récitatif – Allegro), pour orgue |
| 227 | |
| 228 | |
| 229 | B.A.C.H: Six pièces, pour orgue |
| 230 | American Folk-Hymn Settings, for organ |
| 231 | In Memoriam, pour orgue |
| 232 | |
| 233 | |
| 234 | 9 pièces pour trompette (hautboit) et orgue ou piano |
| 235 | Douze versets, pour orgue |
| 236 | Expressions, pour orgue |
| 237 | Fantasy on two old Scottish themes, for organ |
| 238 | Trumpet tune, for organ |
| 239 | |
| 240 | |
| 241 | Vitrail, pour clarinette et piano |
| 242 | |
| 243 | Christmas carol-hymn settings, for organ |
| 244 | Contrasts, for organ |
| 245 | |
| 246 | |
| 247 | |
| 248 | |
| 249 | |
| 250 | Mort et résurrection, pour orgue |
| 251 | Moonlight Scherzo, pour orgue |
| 252 | Trois offertoires, pour orgue |
| 253 | Suite in simplicitate, pour orgue |
| 254 | Trio, pour orgue |

== General references ==
- Thomerson, Kathleen (1988). "Works and Performances". Jean Langlais : a bio-bibliography. New York: Greenwood Press. pp. 23–56. ISBN 0-313-25547-4.
- Labounsky, Ann (2011). The Complete Organ Works of Jean Langlais in 13 volumes (26 CDs) | Recording notes. Voix du Vent.
- West, Melvin (1959). The Organ Works of Jean Langlais (DMA thesis). Boston University. hdl:2144/19814.
