= Flor Peeters =

Flemish organist, composer and music pedagogue

- Born: 4 July 1903; Tielen, Belgium
- Died: 4 July 1986; Mechelen
- Occupations: Organist; Composer; Academic teacher

Franciscus Florentinus Peeters, Baron Peeters (4 July 1903 – 4 July 1986) was a Belgian composer, organist and academic teacher. He was director of the Conservatorium in Antwerp, Belgium, and organist at Mechelen Cathedral from 1923 to his death in 1986.

== Biography ==
Born and raised in the village of Tielen (in the Kempen region, just on the Belgian side of the Belgian-Dutch border), Peeters was the youngest child in a family of eleven. When sixteen years old, he began his studies at the Lemmens Institute in Mechelen (since moved to Leuven), which was named after the nineteenth-century organist Jacques-Nicolas Lemmens. At this college, Peeters's teachers were Lodewijk Mortelmans, Jules Van Nuffel and Oscar Depuydt. Depuydt was well known at the time for his collaboration with the Desmet brothers on the first set of Gregorian accompaniments produced by the Lemmens Institute.

Peeters would later collaborate with Van Nuffel and the institute's other professors, to produce the Nova Organi Harmonia. In 1923 he became an organ teacher at the institute; simultaneously he acquired the position of chief organist at the St. Rumbold's Cathedral in Mechelen, which he held for most of the rest of his life; Van Nuffel had already been choirmaster there for many years.

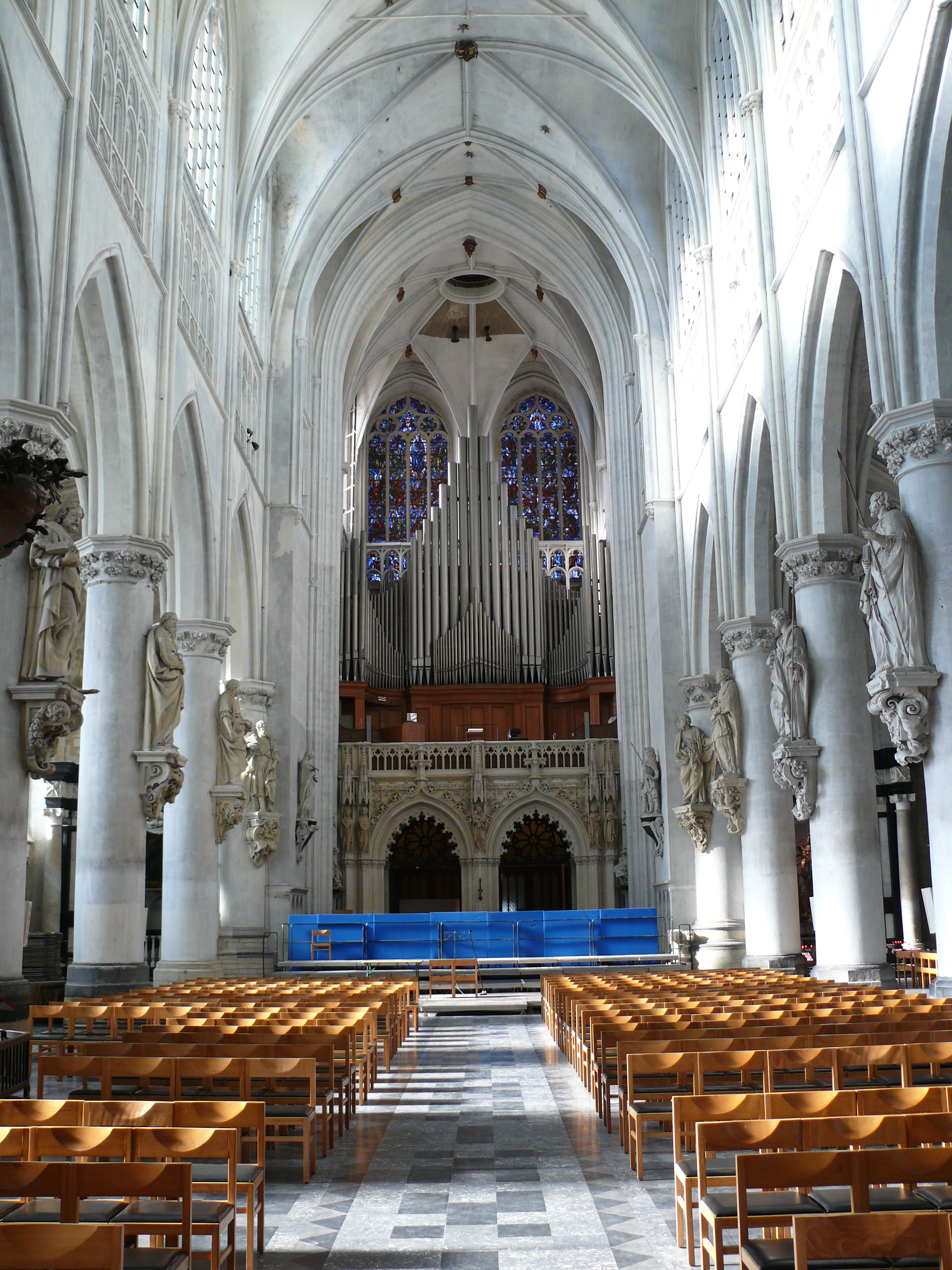
The Mechelen Cathedral organ of 6,606 pipes, built in 1958 to Peeters' specifications

As an organist and pedagogue, Peeters enjoyed great renown, giving concerts and liturgical masterclasses all over the world. He also made recordings of sixteenth-, seventeenth- and eighteenth-century organ music; some of these have been reissued in recent years on compact disc. Most of his own pieces (he wrote well over 100) were for his own instrument, for choir, or for both. Among his many compositions is the well-known Entrata Festiva (opus 93) for choir, brass, timpani, and organ. Other works include Aria (opus 51) and Toccata, fugue and hymn on "Ave Maris Stella" (opus 28),

Peeters studied Renaissance music, particularly of the school of Flemish polyphony. This style was also absorbed into his music. In addition, he showed an interest in twentieth-century techniques such as polyrhythms and polytonality.

He died on his eighty-third birthday; fifteen years before, he had been made a baron by King Baudouin of Belgium.

Pupils of Peeters include the American organist and composer Kathleen Thomerson.

== Selected recordings ==
- Flor-Peeters-Edition, Motette

== Honours ==
- Knight Commander in the Order of Saint Gregory the Great.

== Recordings ==
- Giuseppe Galante - Flor Peeters: Sonata for Trumpet and Piano, Op.51: I. Allegro
- Giuseppe Galante - Flor Peeters: Sonata for Trumpet and Piano, Op.51: II. Aria
- Giuseppe Galante - Flor Peeters: Sonata for Trumpet and Piano, Op.51: III. Finale (Toccata)
