= Château de Bonnefontaine (Ille-et-Vilaine) =

Château in Brittany, France

Coordinates: 48°26′46″N 1°29′26″E

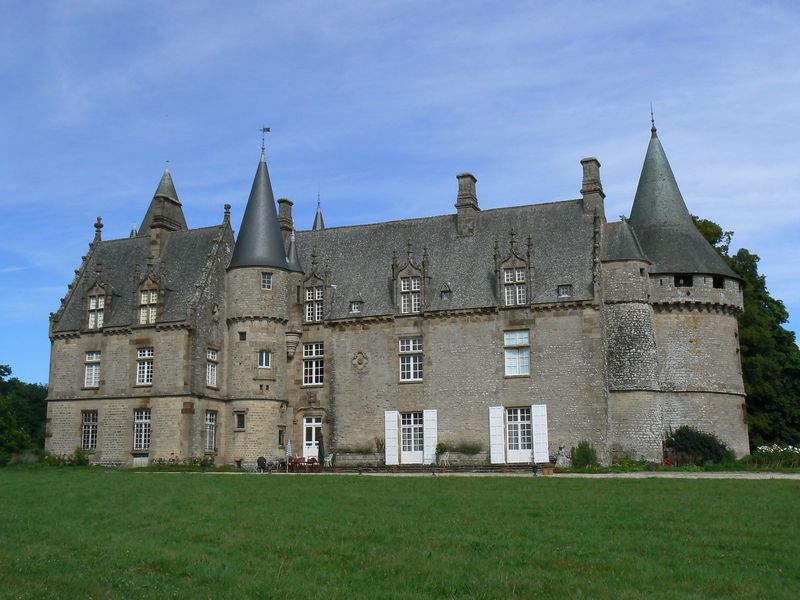
Château de Bonnefontaine

The Château de Bonnefontaine is a château in the commune of Antrain, Ille-et-Vilaine, France. It dates to the second quarter of the 16th century. Noted for its elegant turrets and tall windows, it became a monument historique on 16 September 1943. The park was laid out by Denis Bühler and Édouard André.
