= La Fontenelle, Ille-et-Vilaine =

La Fontenelle Ar Fantanig
- Part of Val-Couesnon
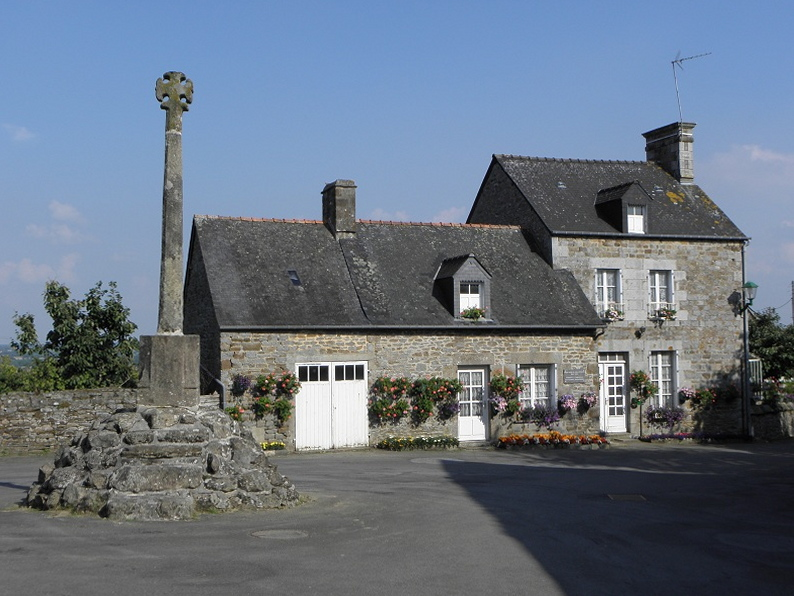
- Birthplace of the composer Jean Langlais
- Location of La Fontenelle
- Location within France Location within Brittany
- Coordinates: 48°28′07″N 1°30′06″W
- Country: France
- Region: Brittany
- Department: Ille-et-Vilaine
- Arrondissement: Fougères-Vitré
- Canton: Antrain
- Commune: Val-Couesnon
- Area^{1}: 12.36 km^{2} (4.77 sq mi)
- Highest elevation: 117 m (384 ft)
- Lowest elevation: 7 m (23 ft)
- Population (2023): 516
  - Density: 41.7/km^{2} (108/sq mi)
- Time zone: UTC+01:00 (CET)
  - Summer (DST): UTC+02:00 (CEST)
- Postal code: 35560
- ^{1} French Land Register data, which excludes lakes, ponds, glaciers > 1 km^{2} (0.386 sq mi or 247 acres) and river estuaries.

La Fontenelle (French pronunciation: [la fɔ̃tnɛl]; Breton: Ar Fantanig; Gallo: La Fontenèll) is a former commune in the Ille-et-Vilaine department of Brittany in north-western France. On 1 January 2019, it was merged into the new commune Val-Couesnon. Inhabitants of La Fontenelle are called in French Fontenellois.

== See also ==
- Communes of the Ille-et-Vilaine department
