= Colona thorelii =

Scientific classification
- Kingdom: Plantae
- Clade: Embryophytes
- Clade: Tracheophytes
- Clade: Angiosperms
- Clade: Eudicots
- Clade: Rosids
- Order: Malvales
- Family: Malvaceae
- Subfamily: Grewioideae
- Genus: Colona
- Species: C. thorelii

Binomial name
- Colona thorelii (Gagnep.) Burret

Synonyms
- Columbia thorelii Gagnep. Colona sinica Hu

Species of tree

Colona thorelii is a species small tree, in the family Malvaceae and now placed in the subfamily Grewioideae; it is named after the French botanist Clovis Thorel. No subspecies are listed in the Catalogue of Life.

The species is distributed in southern China (S. & SE. Yunnan), Indo-China (including Vietnam) and Peninsular Malaysia.

== Description ==
Trees grow to 5–15 m tall, in forested areas up to 800m. The branches are grey-brown stellate and tomentose. Leaves have a petiole 5–10 mm; leaf blades are oblong, 80-150 × 40–70 mm, thinly leathery, densely grey stellate tomentose abaxially, adaxially glabrous, smooth or slightly rough. There are five basal veins and 2-3 pairs of lateral veins; the leaf-base is rounded, margins are plain or slightly serrated near the (acute or acuminate) apex.

Flowering occurs in September–October in southern China with 40–90 mm inflorescences which are terminal or axillary at twig tips. Flower petals are 5–6 mm, with stamens as long as the petals. The bracts are triangular, ovate, or lanceolate, 5–6 mm; bracteoles obovate; pedicel 3–5 mm. Sepals are narrowly lanceolate, 6–7 mm, abaxially grey hairy and adaxially glabrous. The ovary is 3-loculed, hairy; style ca. 5 mm; the stigma is 2-lobed. The grey seed capsules are 20–25 mm in diameter, velvety and 3-winged, with wings approx. 10 mm wide.

== Vernacular Names ==
- Chinese: 狭叶一担柴 xia ye yi dan chai
- Vietnamese: cọ mại nháp, bồ an Thorel
