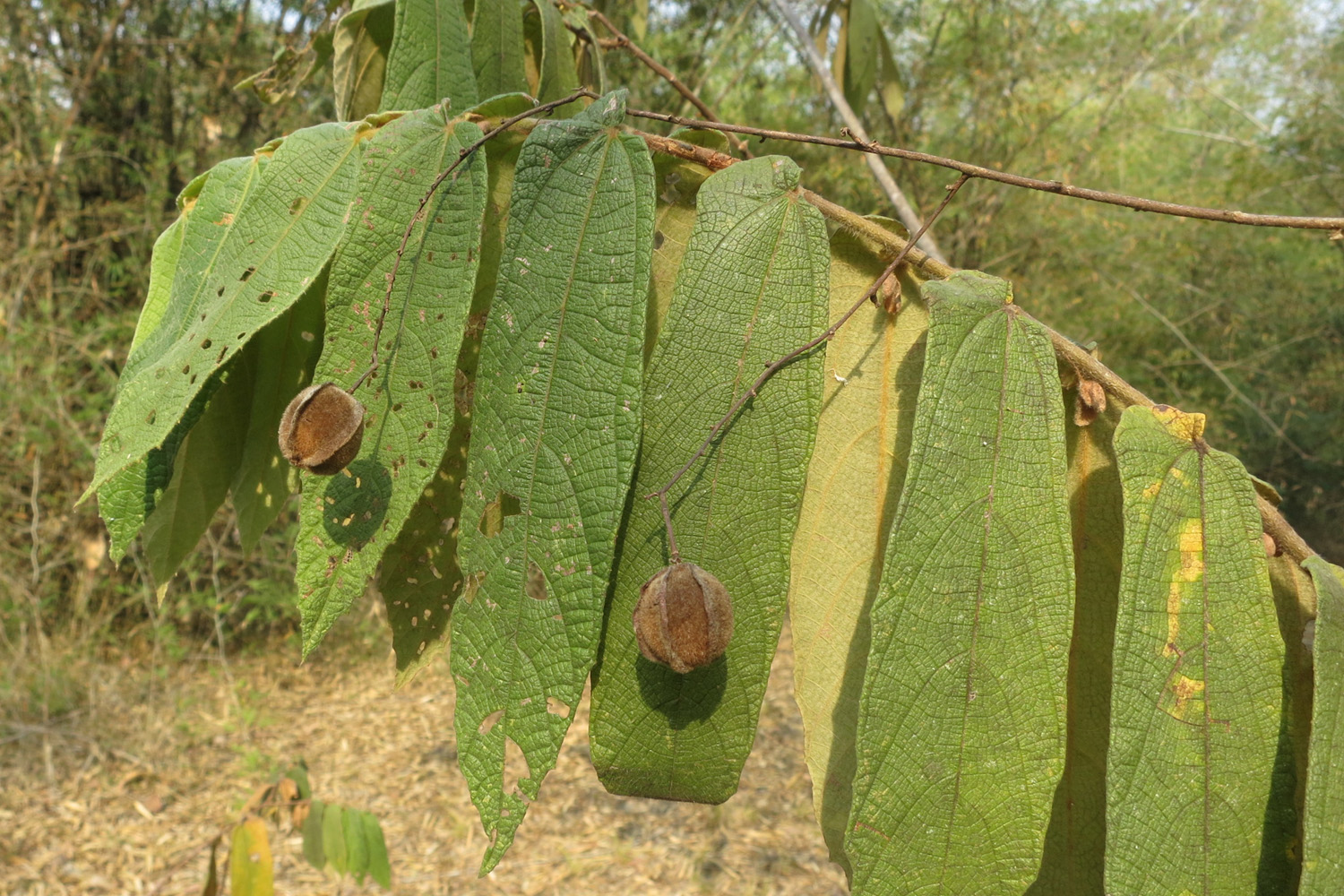
- Dehiscent seed pods and leaves from Cat Tien National Park: where bushes are particularly common in seasonally-flooded forest clearings. R. Bateman

Scientific classification
- Kingdom: Plantae
- Clade: Tracheophytes
- Clade: Angiosperms
- Clade: Eudicots
- Clade: Rosids
- Order: Malvales
- Family: Malvaceae
- Genus: Colona
- Species: C. auriculata

Binomial name
- Colona auriculata (Desf.) Craib

Synonyms
- Diplophractum auriculatum Desf. Columbia auriculata (Desf.) Baill.

= Colona auriculata =

Species of flowering plant

Colona auriculata is a shrub species first described by Desfontaines, with its current name after Craib; the genus Colona is in the family Malvaceae and now placed in the subfamily Grewioideae. No subspecies are listed in the Catalogue of Life.

The species is distributed in Indonesia and throughout Indochina; in Vietnam it is frequently found in the provinces of and between Dong Nai and Ba Ria - Vung Tau its common name is bồ an. The roots are used in Cambodia to make antipyretic herbal medicines.

== Description ==
Colona auriculata is a bushy plant typically 1-5m high, with trailing branches and irregular roots. Leaves are staggered, asymmetrical, densely pubescent on the underside (see illustration). Flowers are variable: mostly yellow with red flecks on petals. Flowering is usually in June - August. The spherical pods are approximately 20 mm in diameter, typically with 5 lobes and contain many seeds.
