= Val-Couesnon =

Val-Couesnon Traoñ-Kouenon (Breton)
- Commune
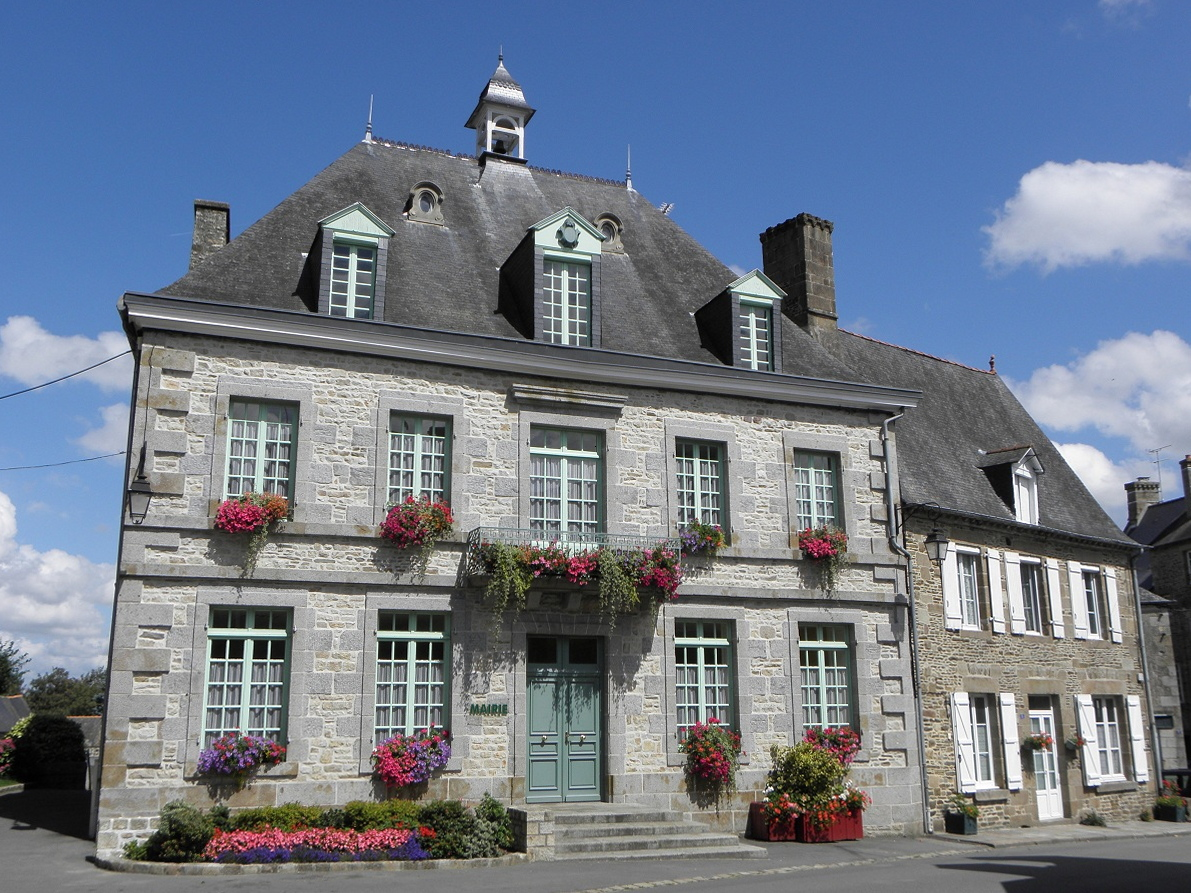
- Town hall in Antrain
- Location of Val-Couesnon
- Location within France Location within Brittany
- Coordinates: 48°27′40″N 1°29′01″W
- Country: France
- Region: Brittany
- Department: Ille-et-Vilaine
- Arrondissement: Fougères-Vitré
- Canton: Val-Couesnon
- Intercommunality: Couesnon Marches de Bretagne

Government
  - Mayor (2020–2026): Emmanuel Houdus
- Area^{1}: 79.01 km^{2} (30.51 sq mi)
- Highest elevation: 117 m (384 ft)
- Lowest elevation: 6 m (20 ft)
- Population (2023): 4,072
  - Density: 51.54/km^{2} (133.5/sq mi)
- Time zone: UTC+01:00 (CET)
  - Summer (DST): UTC+02:00 (CEST)
- INSEE/Postal code: 35004 /35560
- ^{1} French Land Register data, which excludes lakes, ponds, glaciers > 1 km^{2} (0.386 sq mi or 247 acres) and river estuaries.

Val-Couesnon (French pronunciation: [val kwenɔ̃]; Breton: Traoñ-Kouenon) is a commune in the Ille-et-Vilaine department in the Brittany in northwestern France. It was established on 1 January 2019 by merger of the former communes of Antrain (the seat), La Fontenelle, Saint-Ouen-la-Rouërie and Tremblay.

== Population ==
Population data refer to the commune in its geography as of January 2025.

Historical population
Year	Pop.	±% p.a.
1968	4,895	—
1975	4,866	−0.08%
1982	4,504	−1.10%
1990	4,253	−0.71%
1999	4,075	−0.47%
2007	4,248	+0.52%
2012	4,273	+0.12%
2017	4,191	−0.39%
2023	4,072	−0.48%
Source: INSEE

== See also ==
- Communes of the Ille-et-Vilaine department
