= Colona evrardii =

Scientific classification
- Kingdom: Plantae
- Clade: Tracheophytes
- Clade: Angiosperms
- Clade: Eudicots
- Clade: Rosids
- Order: Malvales
- Family: Malvaceae
- Subfamily: Grewioideae
- Genus: Colona
- Species: C. evrardii

Binomial name
- Colona evrardii Gagnep.

Species of tree

Colona evrardii is a species small tree, in the family Malvaceae and now placed in the subfamily Grewioideae. No subspecies are listed in the Catalogue of Life and the species can be found in Laos and Vietnam: where it may be called bồ an Evrard.
