= Tielen Castle =

Castle in Belgium

- Tielen, Belgium
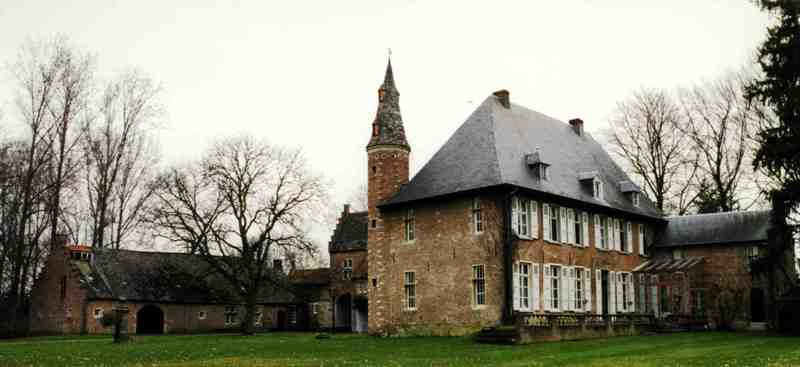
- Tielen Castle

Site information
- Type: Castle

Location
- Coordinates: 51.2474°N 4.8970°E

Tielen or Tielenhof Castle is a castle in Tielen, Belgium.

== History ==
The castle is presumably dating back to the 14th century and was built on the site of a previously fortified and moated farm. For many years, it was the residence of the Lords of Tielen; the first Lord of Tielen was Jan van Duffel, who inherited Tielen from Hendrik IV Berthout in 1320. It was likely his successor, Hendrik van Duffel, who commissioned the construction of the castle. Through marriage and inheritance, the castle subsequently passed into the hands of various noble families, until it was sold for the first time in 1958.

Rebuilt in traditional brick and sandstone style in the 16th and 17th centuries, it was converted into a summer residence by a general restoration in the 1830s, which resulted in the loss of much of its medieval character. Among other things, the two stepped gables of the castle proper disappeared, as did the cross-windows and the building to the north adjoining this wing with a prison on the ground floor and the chapel above. The main entrance was moved from Hofdreef to Gierlebaan and was preserved in the current Kasteeldreef. The gatehouse was also partially demolished in the 19th century, resulting in the disappearance of the guardhouse above the entrance.

In the early 1970s, the castle was restored again by Marcel Dams (1925-2016) and Emilienne Verboven (1929-2019), and partially rebuilt in the 16th-17th century style, including the partial replacement of cross-windows in the castle wing, the reconstruction of the top floor of the gatehouse, and, seen from the street, the building to the right of the castle wing.

After the death of Emilienne Verboven, the castle stood empty and it was put up for sale for an asking price of 2.5 million euros in May 2022.

== See also ==
- List of castles in Belgium
