= Gierle =

- Village
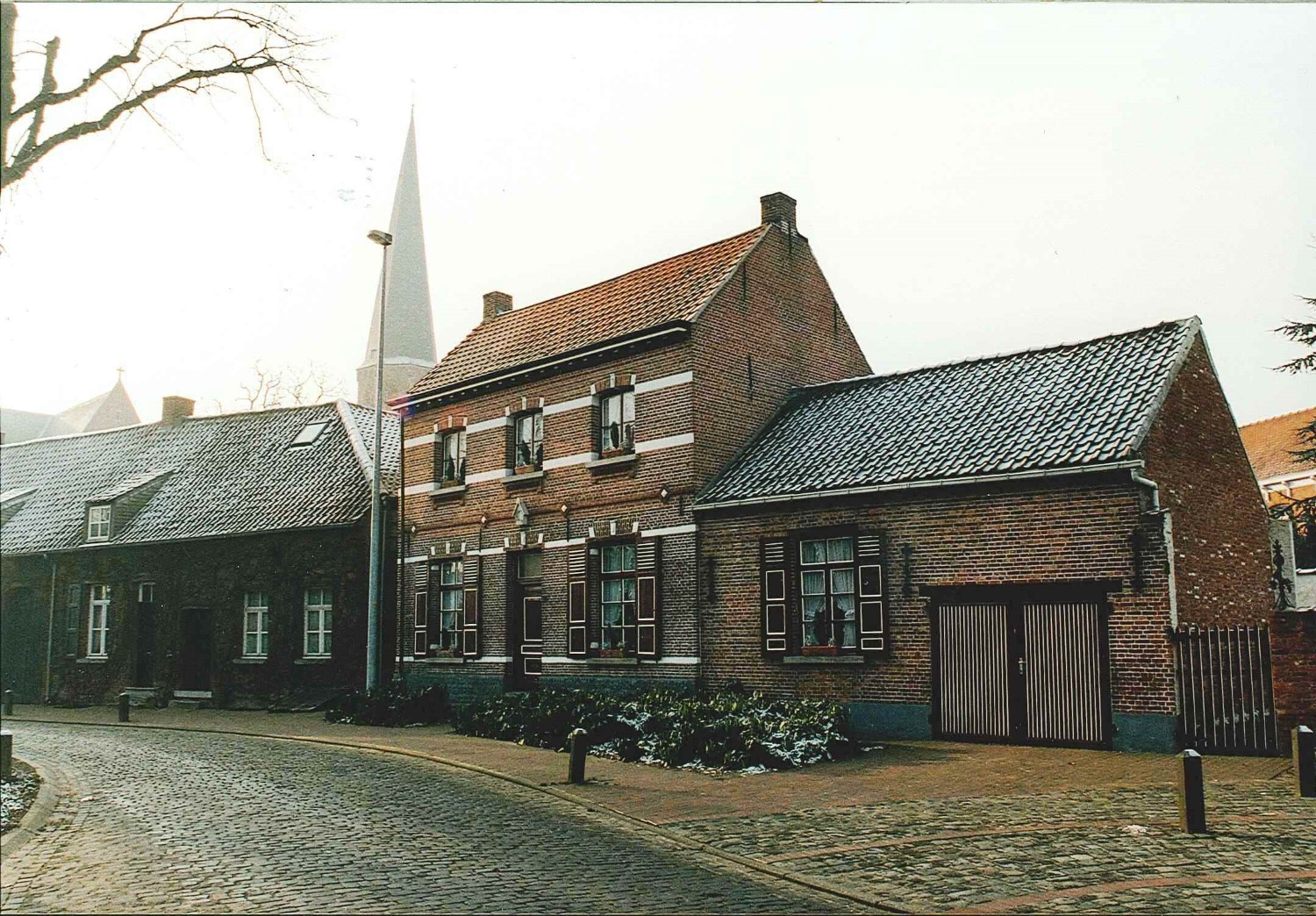

- Location in Belgium
- Coordinates: 51.2667°N 4.8666°E
- Country: Belgium
- Region: Flemish Region
- Province: Antwerp
- Municipality: Lille

Area
  - Total: 18.57 km^{2} (7.17 sq mi)

Population (2021)
  - Total: 4,428
  - Density: 238.4/km^{2} (617.6/sq mi)
- Time zone: CET

Gierle is a village of about 4,428 inhabitants in the Antwerp Province in Flanders, Belgium. It is part of the municipality of Lille.

Characterised by its 19th-century village centre, which has an unusual circular shape, it is more known for its recreation park called "De Lilse Bergen" and its festival called "Sjock".

A famous inhabitant of Gierle was Louis Neefs, who was the Belgian contestant for the Eurovision Song Contest twice. He has a statue in the centre of Gierle. Another famous inhabitant is Walter Meeuws, a retired football player who played for a few clubs in the Belgian first division and also for AFC Ajax. He has 46 caps for the Belgium national team and was in the squad of UEFA Euro 1980 where they reached the final. After his playing career, he has been a coach for teams all over the world.

Through history, Gierle was connected to the neighbouring village Tielen because they shared both lord and priest.
