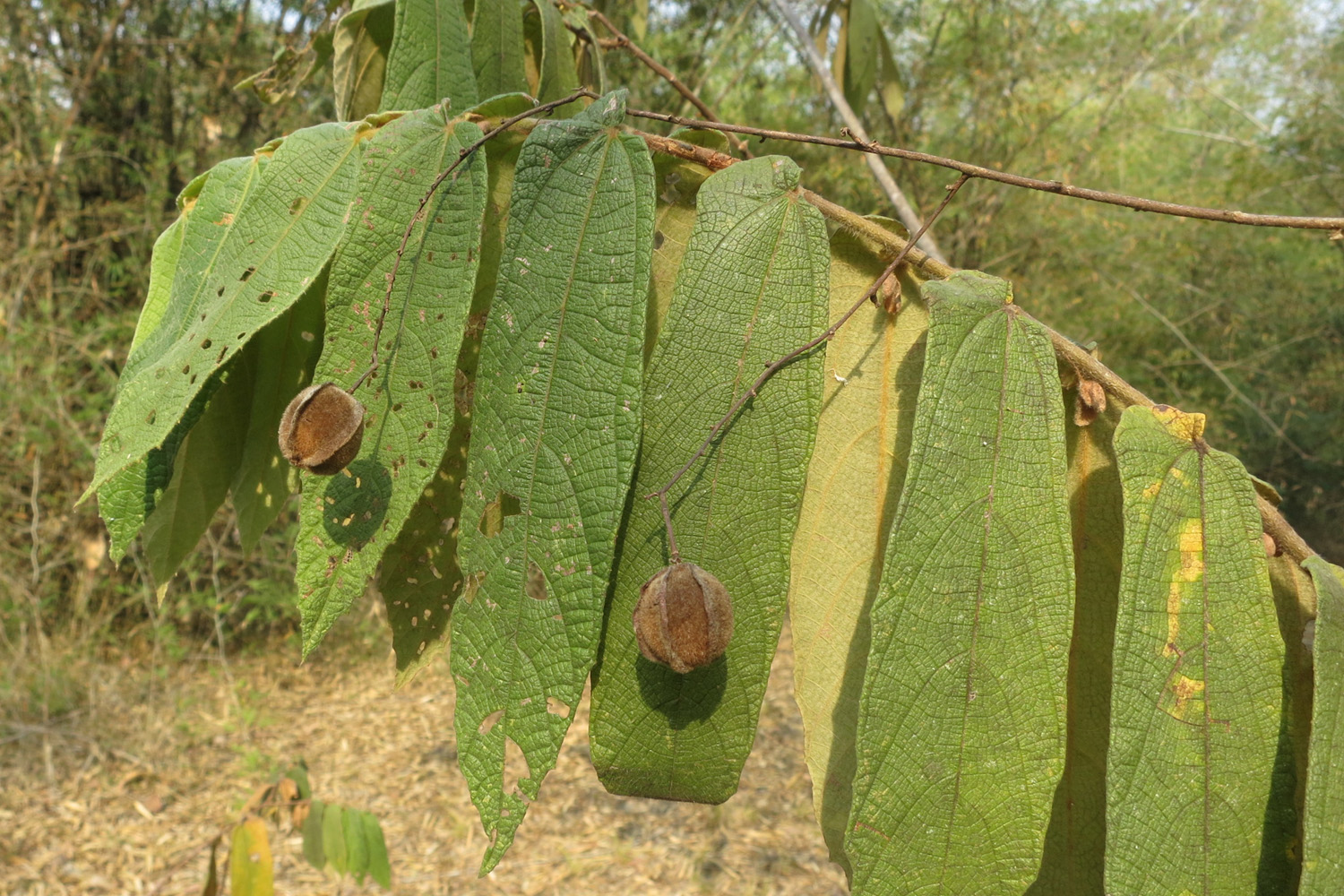
- Colona auriculata: leaves & capsules

Scientific classification
- Kingdom: Plantae
- Clade: Tracheophytes
- Clade: Angiosperms
- Clade: Eudicots
- Clade: Rosids
- Order: Malvales
- Family: Malvaceae
- Subfamily: Grewioideae
- Genus: Colona; Cav. (1789)

Species
- see text

Synonyms
- Columbia Pers.; Diplophractum Desf.

= Colona (plant) =

Genus of flowering plants

Colona is a genus of flowering plant in the Malvaceae sensu lato or Tiliaceae: now placed in the subfamily Grewioideae. It is native to the eastern Indian subcontinent, Indochina, south-central China, Malesia, and New Guinea.

== Species ==
Plants of the World Online accepts 36 species.

- Colona aequilateralis (C.T.White & W.D.Francis) Merr. & L.M.Perry
- Colona angusta (Pierre) Burret
- Colona archboldiana Merr. & L.M.Perry
- Colona auriculata (Desf.) Craib
- Colona blancoi (Rolfe) Merr.
- Colona borneensis (Merr.) Burret
- Colona celebica (Blume) Burret
- Colona discolor Merr. & L.M.Perry
- Colona elobata Craib
- Colona evecta (Pierre) Burret
- Colona evrardii Gagnep.
- Colona flagrocarpa (C.B.Clarke) Craib
- Colona floribunda (Kurz) Craib
- Colona grandiflora Kosterm.
- Colona hirsuta (Warb.) Burret
- Colona isodiametrica Burret
- Colona jagorii (Warb.) Burret
- Colona javanica (Blume) Burret
- Colona kodap Gagnep.
- Colona kostermansiana Wirawan
- Colona lanceolata (Warb.) Burret
- Colona longipetiolata Merr.
- Colona megacarpa (Merr.) Burret
- Colona merguensis (Planch. ex Mast.) Burret
- Colona mollis (Warb.) Burret
- Colona nubla Gagnep.
- Colona philippinensis (S.Vidal) Burret
- Colona poilanei Gagnep.
- Colona rivularis Suddee, Poopath & Rueangr.
- Colona scabra (Sm.) Burret
- Colona serratifolia Cav.
- Colona subaequalis (Planch. ex S.Vidal) Burret
- Colona thorelii (Gagnep.) Burret
- Colona velutina Merr. & L.M.Perry
- Colona velutinosa Kosterm.
- Colona winitii (Craib) Craib
