= Colona poilanei =

Conservation status
- Near Threatened (IUCN 2.3)

Scientific classification
- Kingdom: Plantae
- Clade: Tracheophytes
- Clade: Angiosperms
- Clade: Eudicots
- Clade: Rosids
- Order: Malvales
- Family: Malvaceae
- Genus: Colona
- Species: C. poilanei

Binomial name
- Colona poilanei Gagnep.

Species of tree

Colona poilanei is a species of flowering plant in the Malvaceae sensu lato (previously placed in the Tiliaceae or Sparrmanniaceae). family. It is endemic to Vietnam, (VN name: Chông) where it is described as a near-threatened small pioneer tree found in areas of lowland secondary, disturbed and recolonising tropical forest.
