= Chœur d'Oratorio de Paris =

French choir

The Chœur d'Oratorio de Paris (Oratorio choir of Paris) is a French mixed choir, funded in 1989 by Jean Sourisse.

After forming the Chœur of the Concerts Colonne orchestra and conducting it for seven years, Jean Sourisse created the Chœur d'Oratorio de Paris in November 1989; the Chœur today consists of 70 to 80 experienced but non-professional singers.

The Chœur d’Oratorio de Paris addresses the repertoire best suited to its size and vocation: masses, motets, Requiem and oratorios by Bach, Haydn, Mozart, Mendelssohn, Brahms, César Franck, Gabriel Fauré, Maurice Duruflé, Francis Poulenc, without neglecting the secular repertoire of the 19th and 20th centuries: Schumann, Berlioz, Ravel and many others.

Since its creation, the Choir has been hired by Jean-Claude Malgoire's La Grande Écurie et la Chambre du Roy (Festival des instruments anciens and Festival de la Chaise-Dieu in 1990), and the Orchestre de chambre de Paris, then conducted by Armin Jordan, orchestras with which the Choir has had the opportunity to collaborate many times since then.

Since then, he has participated in numerous productions, being regularly invited by the greatest conductors: (Colin Davis, James Conlon, Theodor Guschlbauer, Jean-Claude Malgoire, John Nelson, Alberto Zedda, Marek Janowski, Tamas Vasary, Jerzy Semkow, Jacques Mercier) and is associated with renowned soloists including Lucia Valentini Terrani, María Bayo, Barbara Hendricks, Nathalie Stutzmann, Sandrine Piau, Laurent Naouri, François Le Roux, José Cura…

The Chœur d’Oratorio de Paris has been invited on numerous occasions since 1992 by the Festival de Saint-Denis, and is collaborating on this occasion with the Orchestre National de France and the Orchestre Philharmonique de Radio France as well as the Orchestre de chambre de Paris.

It performed Gounod's St. Cecilia Mass in June 2004, as well as Schubert's Mass in E-flat, Gabriel Fauré's Requiem in June 2003, under the direction of John Nelson.

In 2005, it was again under the direction of John Nelson that the Chœur d'Oratorio de Paris gave Beethoven's Ninth Symphony in concert at the Théâtre des Champs-Élysées in Paris, and in Reims for the opening concert of the "flâneries musicales". It then recorded the work as part of a complete discography of the nine symphonies, published in December 2006 by Ambroisie.

The choir also performs annually under Sourisse's direction, works such as Liszt's Missa Choralis, Ein deutsches Requiem by Brahms, the Requiem by Alfred Desenclos, Duruflé's Requiem, Bach's Mass in B minor, Mendelssohn's Psalms, Jean-Joseph de Mondonville's Grand motet, and Marc Antoine Charpentier's Grand motet.

== Recordings ==
- 2006: Beethoven's Symphony No. 9 (as part of Beethoven's complete symphonies, Chœur d’oratorio de Paris. Ensemble orchestral de Paris, Direction John Nelson)
- 2002: Felix Mendelssohn's Three Great Psalms for solo, choir and orchestra (Ensemble Jean-Walter Audoli. Direction Jean Sourisse, Studio SM D2954)
