= Kasterlee =

- Municipality
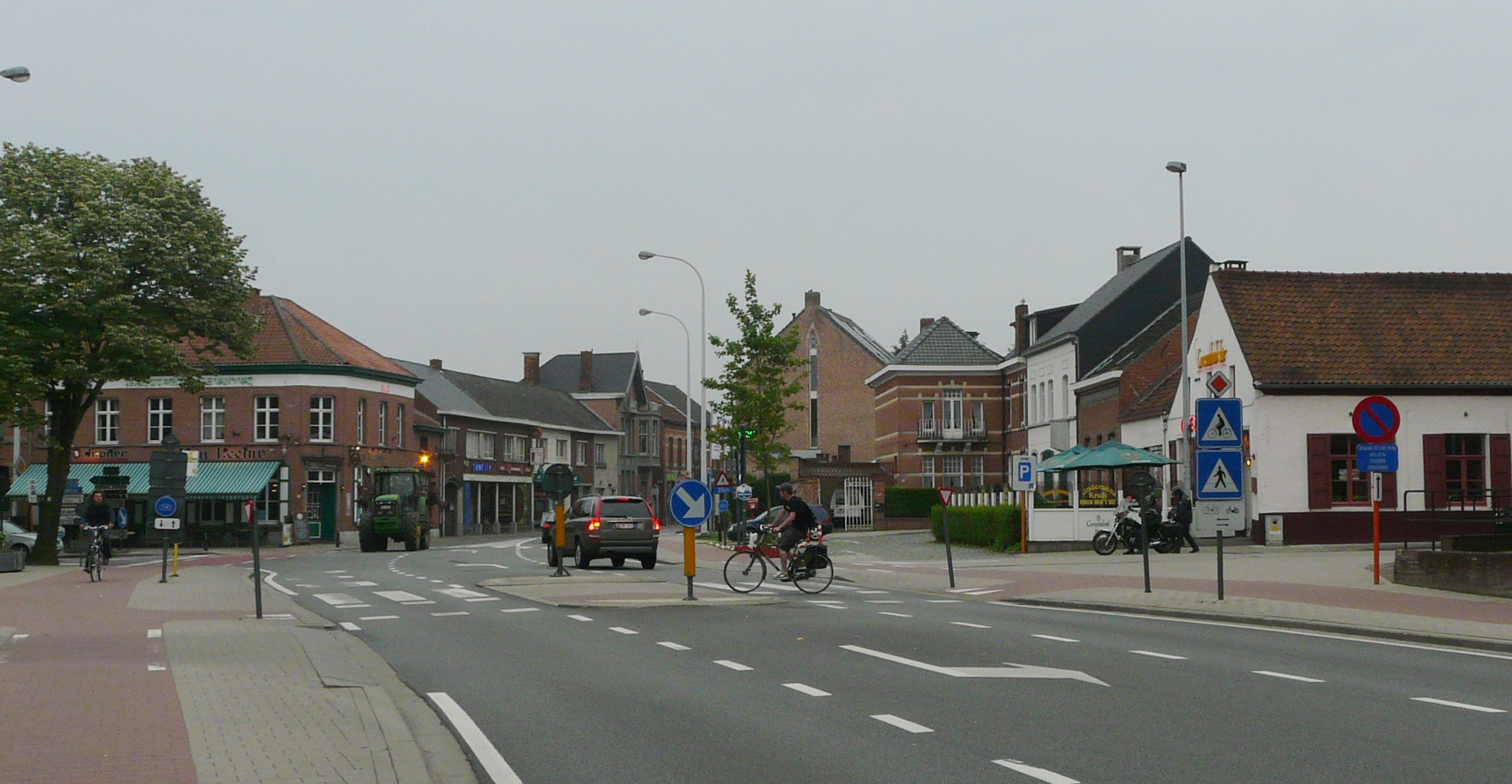

- Flag Coat of arms

- Location of Kasterlee in the province of Antwerp
- Interactive map of Kasterlee
- Location in Belgium
- Coordinates: 51°15′N 04°57′E
- Country: Belgium
- Community: Flemish Community
- Region: Flemish Region
- Province: Antwerp
- Arrondissement: Turnhout

Government
  - Mayor: Ward Kennes (CD&V)
  - Governing party: CD&V

Area
  - Total: 72.27 km^{2} (27.90 sq mi)

Population (2020-01-01)
  - Total: 18,882
  - Density: 261.3/km^{2} (676.7/sq mi)
- Postal codes: 2460
- NIS code: 13017
- Area codes: 014
- Website: www.kasterlee.be

Kasterlee (Dutch pronunciation: [ˈkɑstərleː]) is a municipality located in the Belgian province of Antwerp. The municipality comprises the towns of Kasterlee proper, Lichtaart and Tielen. In 2021, Kasterlee had a total population of 19,052. The total area is 71.56 km^{2}. The town is twinned with Plaffeien (Switzerland).

== Notable Person ==
- Baron Bob Stouthuysen (b. 10 March 1929), businessman.

== Gallery ==
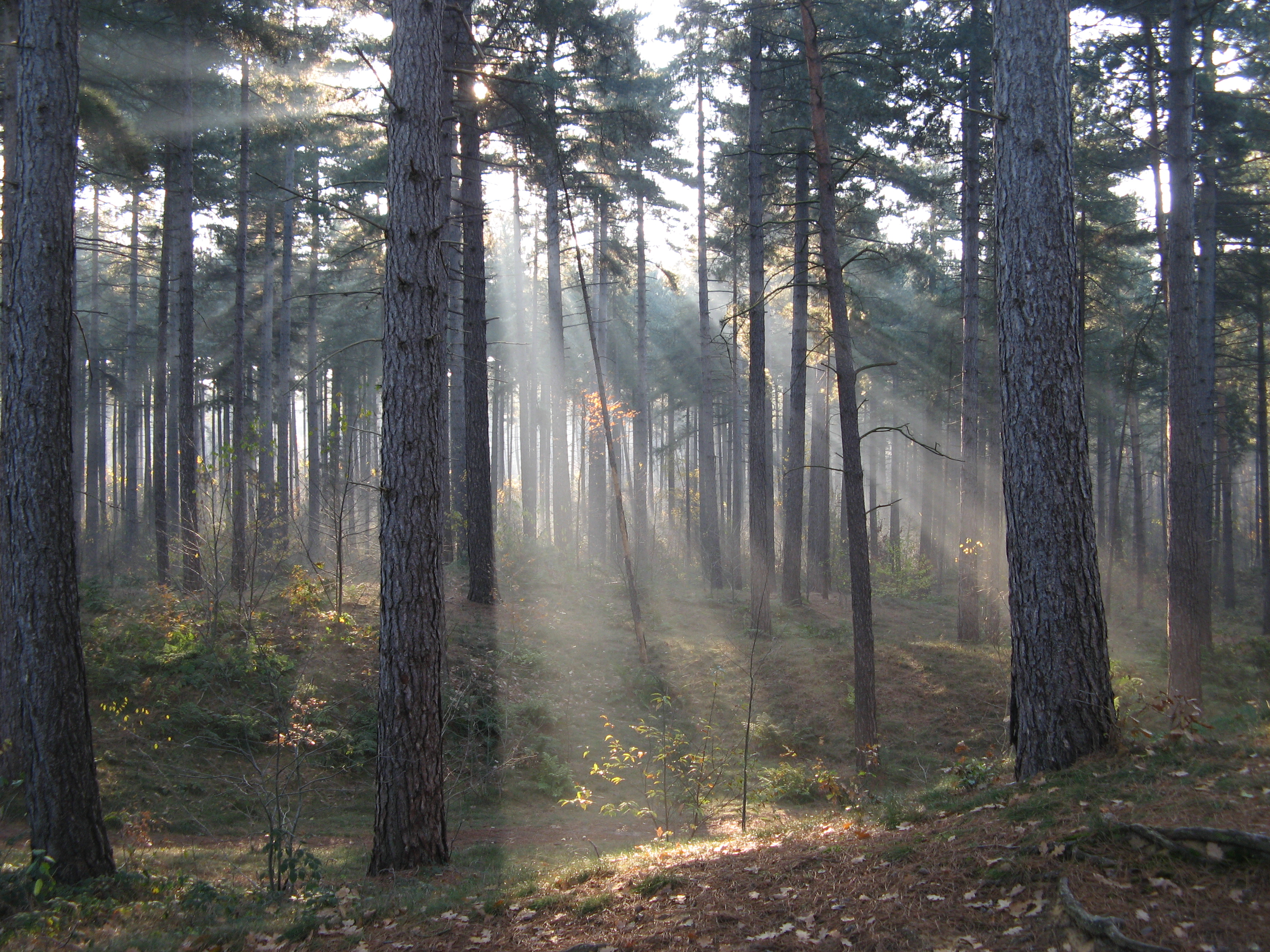
Crepuscular rays in the woods of Kasterlee

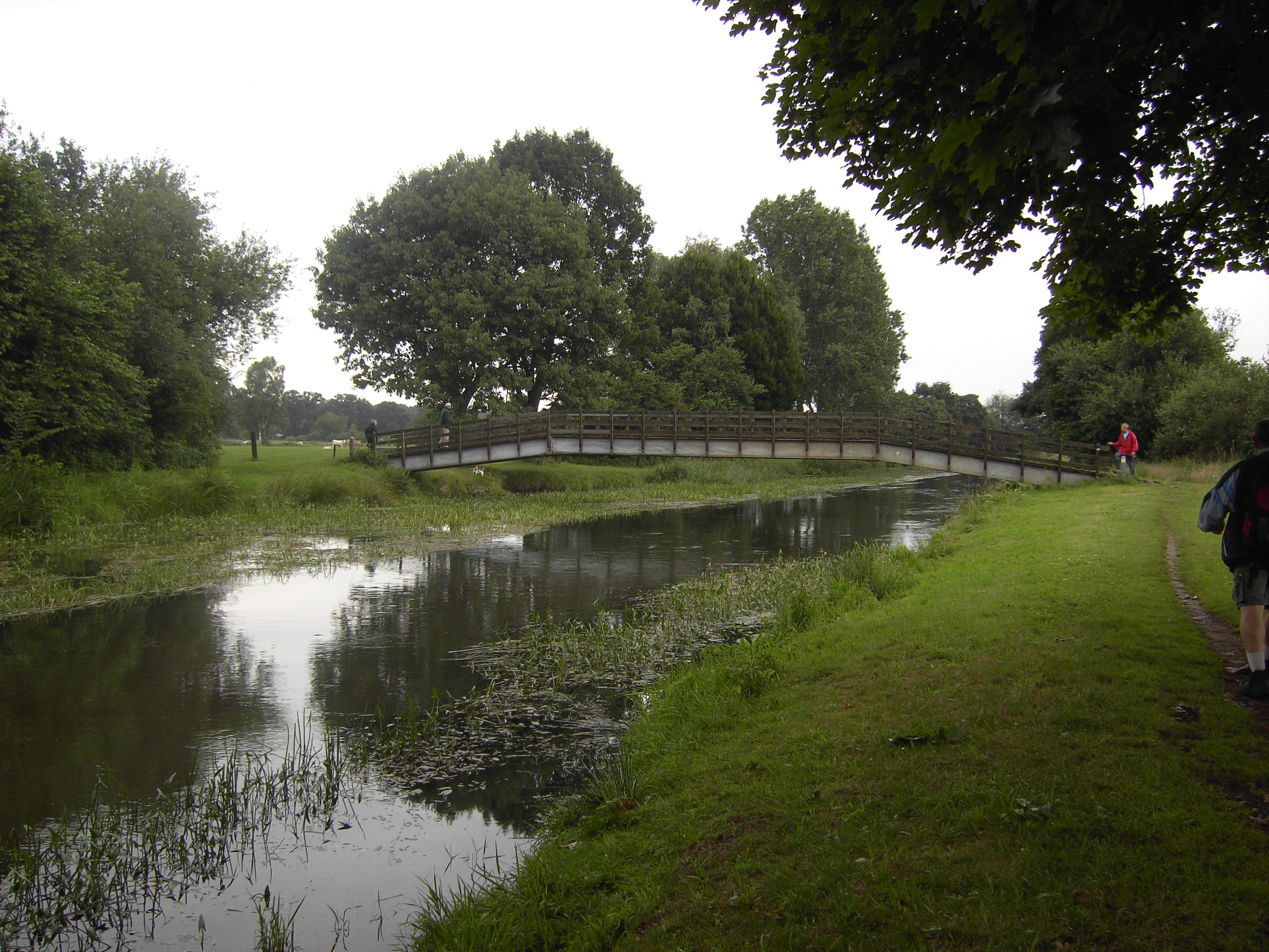
the Kleine Nete in Kasterlee

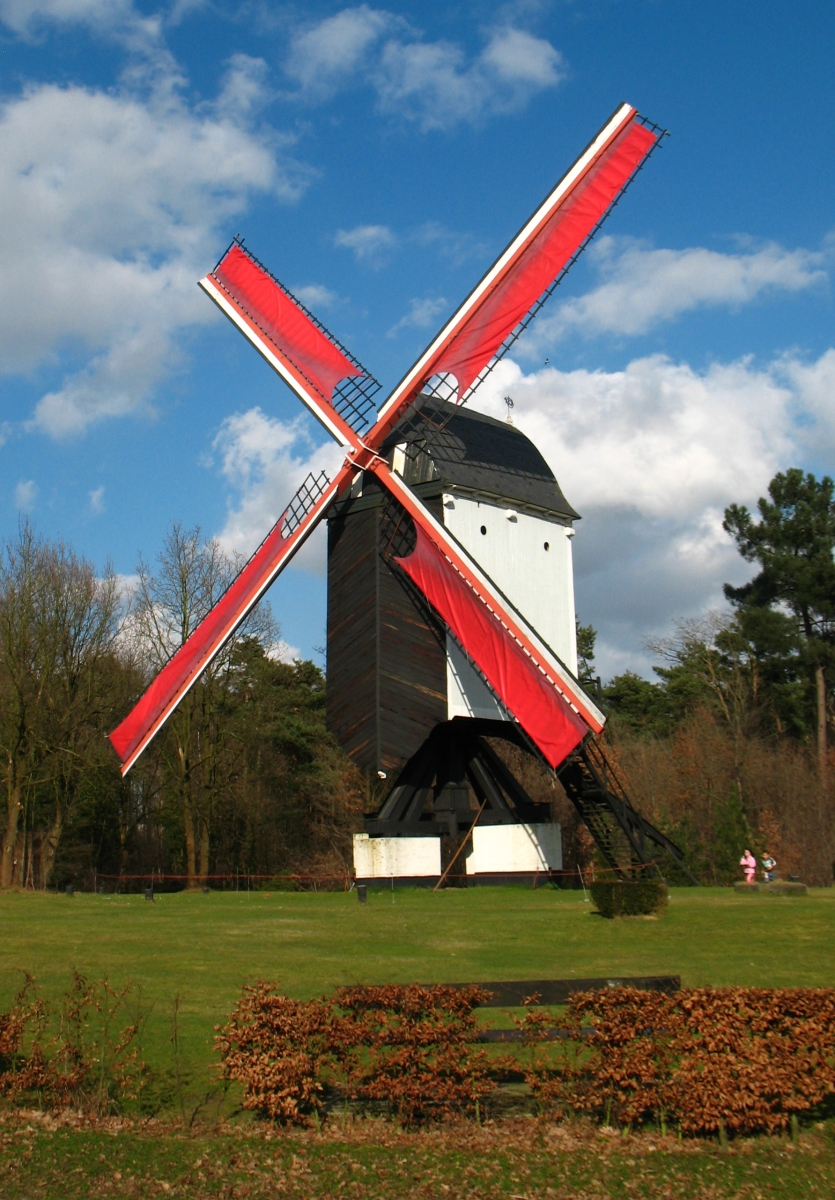
Keeses Molen
