= Antrain =

- Part of Val-Couesnon
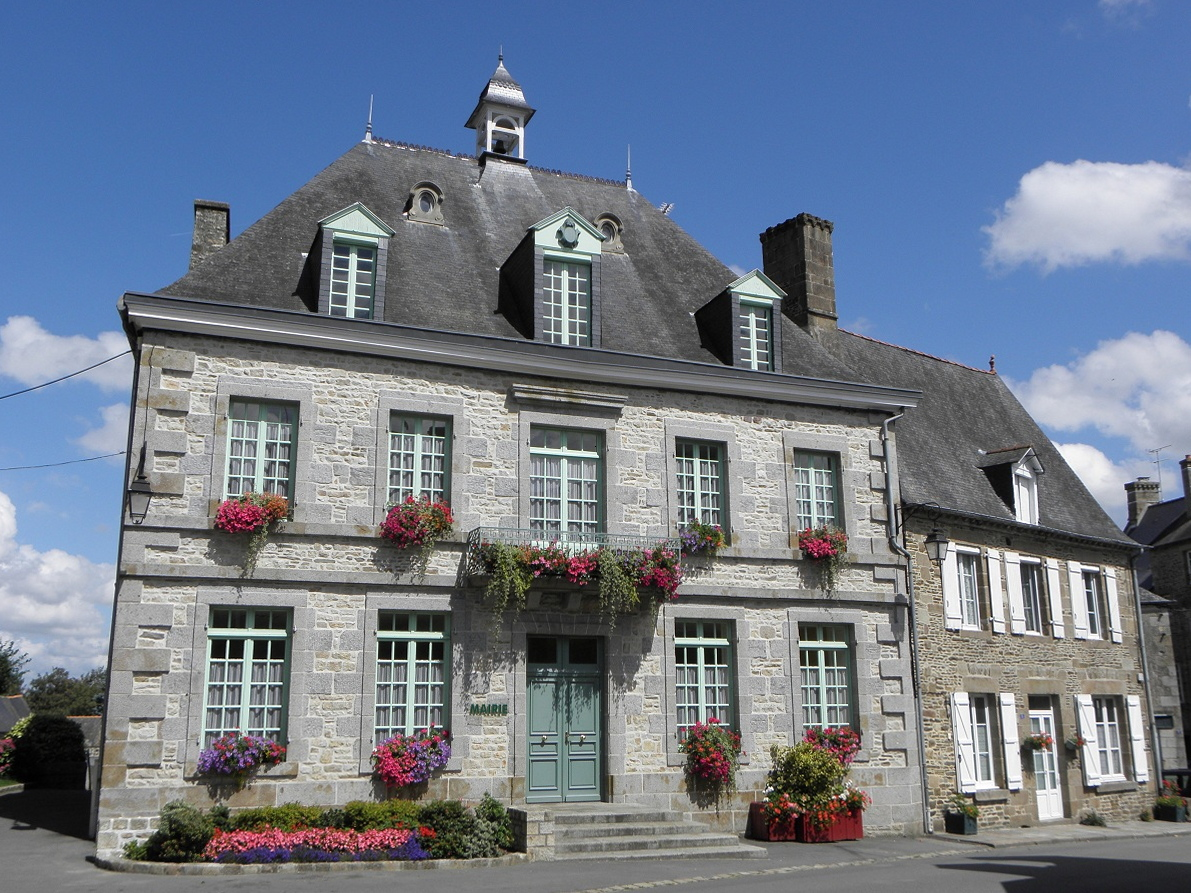
- Town hall

- Coat of arms
- Location of Antrain
- Location within France Location within Brittany
- Coordinates: 48°27′40″N 1°29′01″W
- Country: France
- Region: Brittany
- Department: Ille-et-Vilaine
- Arrondissement: Fougères-Vitré
- Canton: Antrain
- Commune: Val-Couesnon
- Area^{1}: 9.31 km^{2} (3.59 sq mi)
- Highest elevation: 84 m (276 ft)
- Lowest elevation: 6 m (20 ft)
- Population (2022): 1,261
  - Density: 135/km^{2} (351/sq mi)
- Time zone: UTC+01:00 (CET)
  - Summer (DST): UTC+02:00 (CEST)
- Postal code: 35560
- ^{1} French Land Register data, which excludes lakes, ponds, glaciers > 1 km^{2} (0.386 sq mi or 247 acres) and river estuaries.

Antrain (French pronunciation: [ɑ̃tʁɛ̃]; Breton: Entraven; Gallo: Antrein) is a former commune in the Ille-et-Vilaine department in the Brittany in northwestern France. On 1 January 2019, it was merged into the new commune Val-Couesnon. Château de Bonnefontaine dates to the second quarter of the 16th century.

== Population ==
Inhabitants of Antrain are called Antrenais in French.

Historical population

| Year | Pop. | ±% p.a. |
|---|---|---|
| 1793 | 1,522 | — |
| 1800 | 1,375 | −1.44% |
| 1806 | 1,527 | +1.76% |
| 1821 | 1,524 | −0.01% |
| 1831 | 1,742 | +1.35% |
| 1836 | 1,651 | −1.07% |
| 1841 | 1,567 | −1.04% |
| 1846 | 1,648 | +1.01% |
| 1851 | 1,696 | +0.58% |
| 1856 | 1,613 | −1.00% |
| 1861 | 1,557 | −0.70% |
| 1866 | 1,642 | +1.07% |
| 1872 | 1,630 | −0.12% |
| 1876 | 1,582 | −0.74% |
| 1881 | 1,601 | +0.24% |
| 1886 | 1,525 | −0.97% |
| 1891 | 1,575 | +0.65% |
| 1896 | 1,550 | −0.32% |

| Year | Pop. | ±% p.a. |
|---|---|---|
| 1901 | 1,550 | +0.00% |
| 1906 | 1,443 | −1.42% |
| 1911 | 1,552 | +1.47% |
| 1921 | 1,484 | −0.45% |
| 1926 | 1,417 | −0.92% |
| 1931 | 1,383 | −0.48% |
| 1936 | 1,459 | +1.08% |
| 1946 | 1,682 | +1.43% |
| 1954 | 1,528 | −1.19% |
| 1962 | 1,444 | −0.70% |
| 1968 | 1,443 | −0.01% |
| 1975 | 1,548 | +1.01% |
| 1982 | 1,499 | −0.46% |
| 1990 | 1,489 | −0.08% |
| 1999 | 1,387 | −0.79% |
| 2006 | 1,386 | −0.01% |
| 2022 | 1,261 | −0.59% |

Source: EHESS and INSEE

== See also ==
- Communes of the Ille-et-Vilaine department
