= Kathleen Thomerson =

American organist and hymnwriter (1934–2025)

Kathleen Armstrong Thomerson (February 18, 1934 – April 7, 2025) was an American organist and hymnwriter.

== Biography ==
A native of Jackson, Tennessee, Thomerson spent portions of her childhood in Mississippi, California, and Texas. She attended the University of Texas, receiving a bachelor's degree in music in 1956 and a master's degree in 1958; she also studied at Syracuse University, with Flor Peeters at the Royal Conservatoire of Antwerp, and with Jean Langlais in Paris. She worked as the music director of University United Methodist Church in St. Louis, and taught organ at the Saint Louis Conservatory and at Southern Illinois University Edwardsville; she also worked as organist and music director at Mt. Olive Lutheran Church in Austin, Texas. She was a Fellow of the American Guild of Organists.

As a writer of hymns, Thomerson was best known for the text "I Want to Walk as a Child of the Light", written in the summer of 1966 after a visit to the Church of the Redeemer in Houston, and set to her own tune, Houston. She composed other hymn tunes as well, including several for publication in the 2005 collection A Taste of Heaven's Joys: A Collection of Original Hymns, written with Patricia B. Clark. She published a bio-bibliography of her teacher Langlais in 1989, and a biography of Marie-Claire Alain in 2002.

While at the University of Texas, Kathleen Armstrong met Jamie Edward Thomerson, marrying him on June 1, 1957. He went on to a career as an ichthyologist and professor at Southern Illinois University Edwardsville. The couple had three children, two sons and a daughter, and remained together until his death from prostate cancer on January 4, 2015.

Thomerson died on April 7, 2025, at the age of 91.
