= Tremblay, Ille-et-Vilaine =

Tremblay Kreneg
- Part of Val-Couesnon
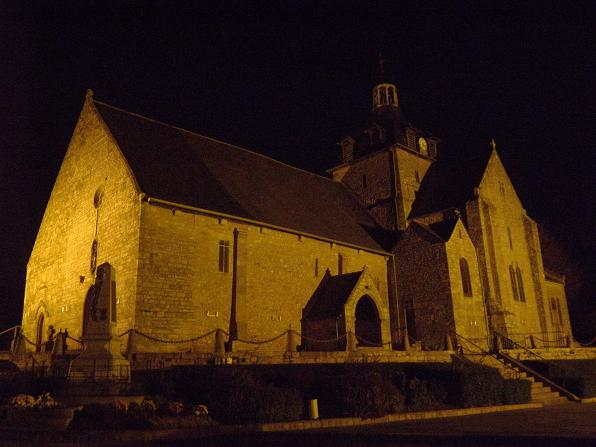
- The church in Tremblay
- Location of Tremblay
- Location within France Location within Brittany
- Coordinates: 48°25′23″N 1°28′29″W
- Country: France
- Region: Brittany
- Department: Ille-et-Vilaine
- Arrondissement: Fougères-Vitré
- Canton: Antrain
- Commune: Val-Couesnon
- Area^{1}: 36.22 km^{2} (13.98 sq mi)
- Highest elevation: 116 m (381 ft)
- Lowest elevation: 10 m (33 ft)
- Population (2022): 1,482
  - Density: 40.92/km^{2} (106.0/sq mi)
- Time zone: UTC+01:00 (CET)
  - Summer (DST): UTC+02:00 (CEST)
- Postal code: 35460
- ^{1} French Land Register data, which excludes lakes, ponds, glaciers > 1 km^{2} (0.386 sq mi or 247 acres) and river estuaries.

Tremblay (French pronunciation: [tʁɑ̃blɛ]; Breton: Kreneg) is a former commune in the Ille-et-Vilaine department of Brittany in northwestern France. On 1 January 2019, it was merged into the new commune Val-Couesnon.

The botanist René Louiche Desfontaines (1750–1833) was born near Tremblay.

== Population ==
Inhabitants of Tremblay are called in French tremblaisiens.

Historical population
| Year | Pop. | ±% p.a. |
|---|---|---|
| 1962 | 1,707 | — |
| 1968 | 1,707 | +0.00% |
| 1975 | 1,736 | +0.24% |
| 1982 | 1,624 | −0.95% |
| 1990 | 1,453 | −1.38% |
| 1999 | 1,423 | −0.23% |
| 2022 | 1,482 | +0.18% |
Source: EHESS and INSEE

== See also ==
- Communes of the Ille-et-Vilaine department
