= Lichtaart =

- Village
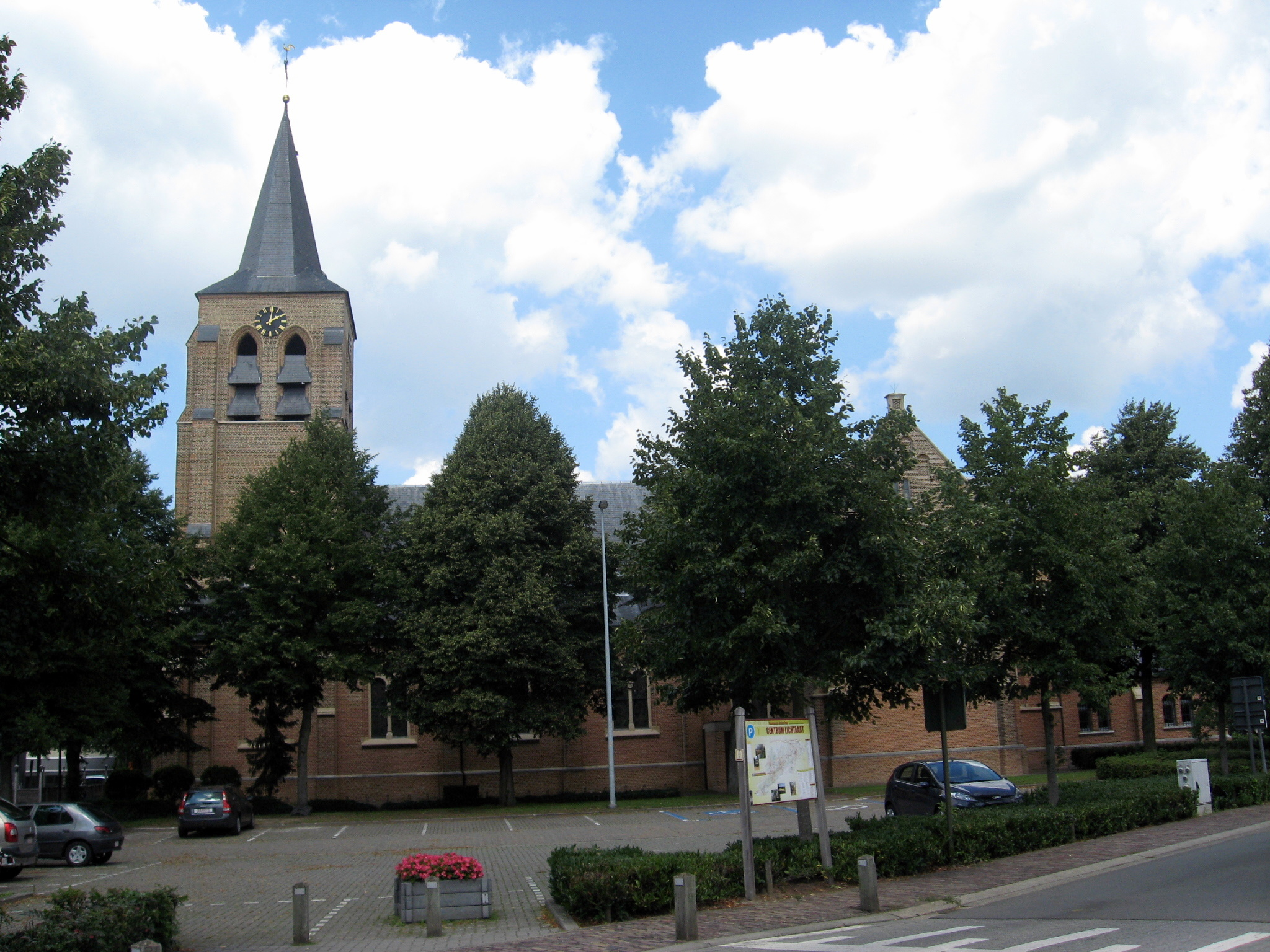
- Our Lady Church

- Location in Belgium
- Coordinates: 51°13′29″N 4°55′13″E
- Country: Belgium
- Region: Flemish Region
- Province: Antwerp
- Municipality: Kasterlee

Area
  - Total: 25.28 km^{2} (9.76 sq mi)

Population (2021)
  - Total: 6,373
  - Density: 252.1/km^{2} (652.9/sq mi)
- Time zone: UTC+1
- Postal code: 2460

Lichtaart is a village in Belgium, in the province of Antwerp and municipality of Kasterlee. The village is situated near the town, Antwerp. Lichtaart bordered by the Rivers, Nete and Kaliebeek. In 1977, Lichtaart had an area of 25 km ² and had 4229 inhabitants. Lichtaart is notable for the theme park, Bobbejaanland and the folk singer, Bobbejaan Schoepen.

== Demographics ==
=== Growth of population ===
19th Century
Year	Pop.	±%
1806	1,394	—
1816	1,338	−4.0%
1830	1,475	+10.2%
1846	1,572	+6.6%
1856	1,597	+1.6%
1866	1,646	+3.1%
1876	1,631	−0.9%
1880	1,607	−1.5%
1890	1,683	+4.7%
Note: census results on 31/12

20th Century to Local Refurbishment
Year	Pop.	±%
1900	1,702	—
1910	1,810	+6.3%
1920	1,851	+2.3%
1930	2,197	+18.7%
1947	2,517	+14.6%
1961	3,352	+33.2%
1970	3,773	+12.6%
1976	4,229	+12.1%
Note: census results on 31/12/1970 to 31/12/1976

== Landmarks ==
- The neo-Romanesque church (1864) in the village has a large, gothic tower (16th century) and a bell housing from the 17th century.
- Bobbejaanland, Theme Park

== Famous residents ==
- Bobbejaan Schoepen
- Louis Croenen
