= Jean Sourisse =

French choral conductor (born 1940)

Jean Sourisse (born 1940 in Rabat, Morocco) is a French choral conductor. He successively founded and directed the vocal ensemble Audite Nova, the choir of the Concerts Colonne, the vocal Ensemble Jean Sourisse, and the Chœur d'Oratorio de Paris.

== Biography ==
Although Jean Sourisse was interested in the field of voice at an early age - he was himself a singer - it was through his studies as an organist that Jean Sourisse began his musical apprenticeship. It was only after completing his professional training in this field that he decided to devote himself fully to singing and his pedagogy.

He then initiated himself into conducting the choir with the greatests: Philippe Caillard, César Geoffray, and then perfected his skills with Michel Corboz, Eric Ericson and Frieder Bernius.

In parallel to his career at the Education Nationale (teacher at the Université Paris IV Sorbonne, Jean Sourisse prepared candidates for the choir conducting test for the aggregation of musical education and professor of musical art at the Antony Descarte college, Jean Sourisse began in 1968 a career as founder and director of vocal ensembles.

It was first the Audite Nova vocal ensemble, which won nine international prizes and a special jury prize from Arezzo. Then it was the Choir of the Orchestre Colonne, created in 1981 at the request of Marcel Landowski, with whom Jean Sourisse worked for seven years on the great choro-symphonic works from the 18th century to the present day. Since 1989, he has continued this work at the head of the 90 singers of the Paris Oratorio Choir and the Ensemble Vocal, which bears his name. In 1998, he obtained a mention of excellence at the Rencontres Chorales Internationales of Montreux (Switzerland).

== Distinctions ==
- 1998: Mention of excellence at the 34th International Choral Meeting in Montreux.
- 1990: International contest of Arezzo (Italy: first prize (mixed voices), first prize (equal women's voices), special prize awarded to Jean Sourisse for the best performance of Renaissance music.
- 1989: 2nd prize (mixed choirs) of the International competition of Spittal (Austria).
- 1984: Grand prize of the Forum Régional des Chœurs d' Île-de-France.
- 1977: 2nd prize of the International Choral Singing Competition of Tours.
- 1973: first prize of the international "let the people sing" competition organised by the BBC (London).
- 1973: 2nd prize of the International Choral Singing Competition of Tours and special Francis Poulenc prize.
