= René Louiche Desfontaines =

French botanist (1750-1833)

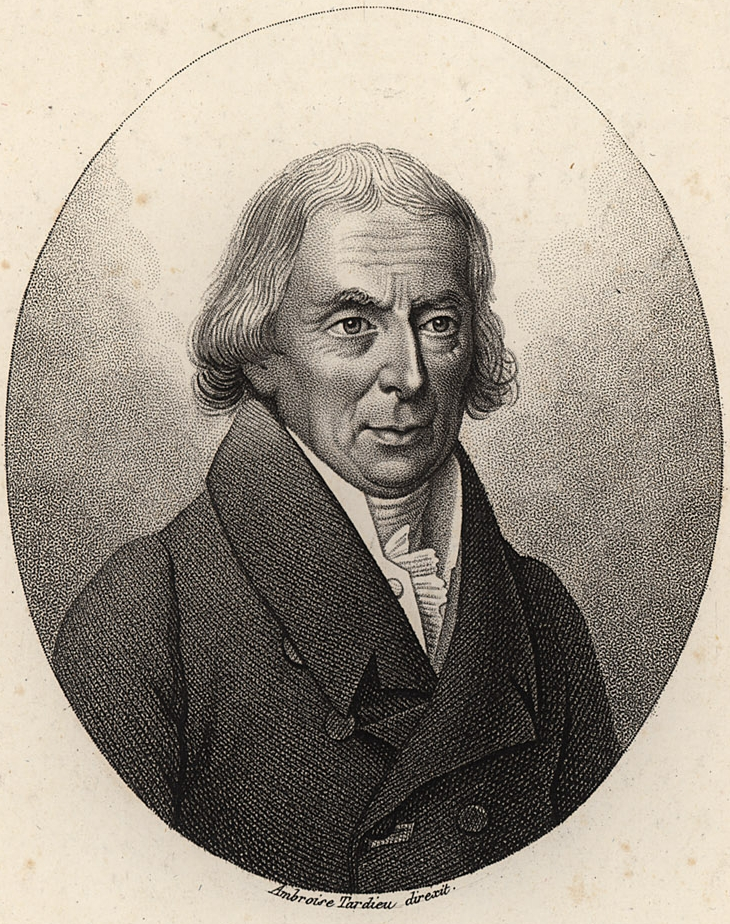
- Born: 14 February 1750; Tremblay, Ille-et-Vilaine, France
- Died: 16 November 1833 (aged 83)
- Known for: Flora Atlantica
- Awards: Légion d’honneur
- Scientific career
- Institutions: Jardin des Plantes, Muséum National d'Histoire Naturelle
- Author abbrev. (botany): Desf.

René Louiche Desfontaines (French pronunciation: [ʁəne lwiʃ defɔ̃tɛn]; 14 February 1750 – 16 November 1833) was a French botanist.

== Biography ==
Desfontaines was born near Tremblay in Brittany. He attended the Collège de Rennes and in 1773 went to Paris to study medicine. His interest in botany originated from lectures at the Jardin des Plantes given by Louis Guillaume Lemonnier. He excelled in his new interest and was elected to the French Academy of Sciences in 1783. He was also a member of the Académie Nationale de Médecine.

Desfontaines spent two years in Tunisia and Algeria, returning with a large collection of plants. He wrote Flora Atlantica (1798–1799, 2 vols), which included 300 genera new to science.

In addition, he worked also on ornithology, and presented the findings of his expeditions to Africa for one of the Memoires de L'Académie Royale des Sciences. Although the Mémoire corresponds to the year 1787, it was not published until 1789 by L'Imprimerie Royal as part of the Histoire de L'Académie Royale de Sciences. The convulsions of the French Revolution may have made the access to the text so scarce that in 1880 the ornithologist Alfred Newton republished the original text under the title Desfontaines's Mémoire sur quelques nouvelles espèces d'oiseaux des côtes de Barbarie on behalf of the Willughby Society of London.

In 1786, he was appointed professor of botany at the Jardin des Plantes, replacing Lemonnier. He later became director of the Muséum National d'Histoire Naturelle, was one of the founders of the Institut de France, president of the Academy of Sciences, and elected to the Légion d’honneur. During the French Revolution he was appointed to the Commission Temporaire des Arts where he shaped a new vision of Natural History.

Desfontaines established a herbarium, known as the Flora Atlantica, which has 1480 specimens and contains many type specimens for Mediterranean species. It was left to the City of Paris after his death.

The genera Desfontainia and Fontanesia are named for this author.

The standard author abbreviation Desf. is used to indicate this individual as the author when citing a botanical name.

== List of works ==
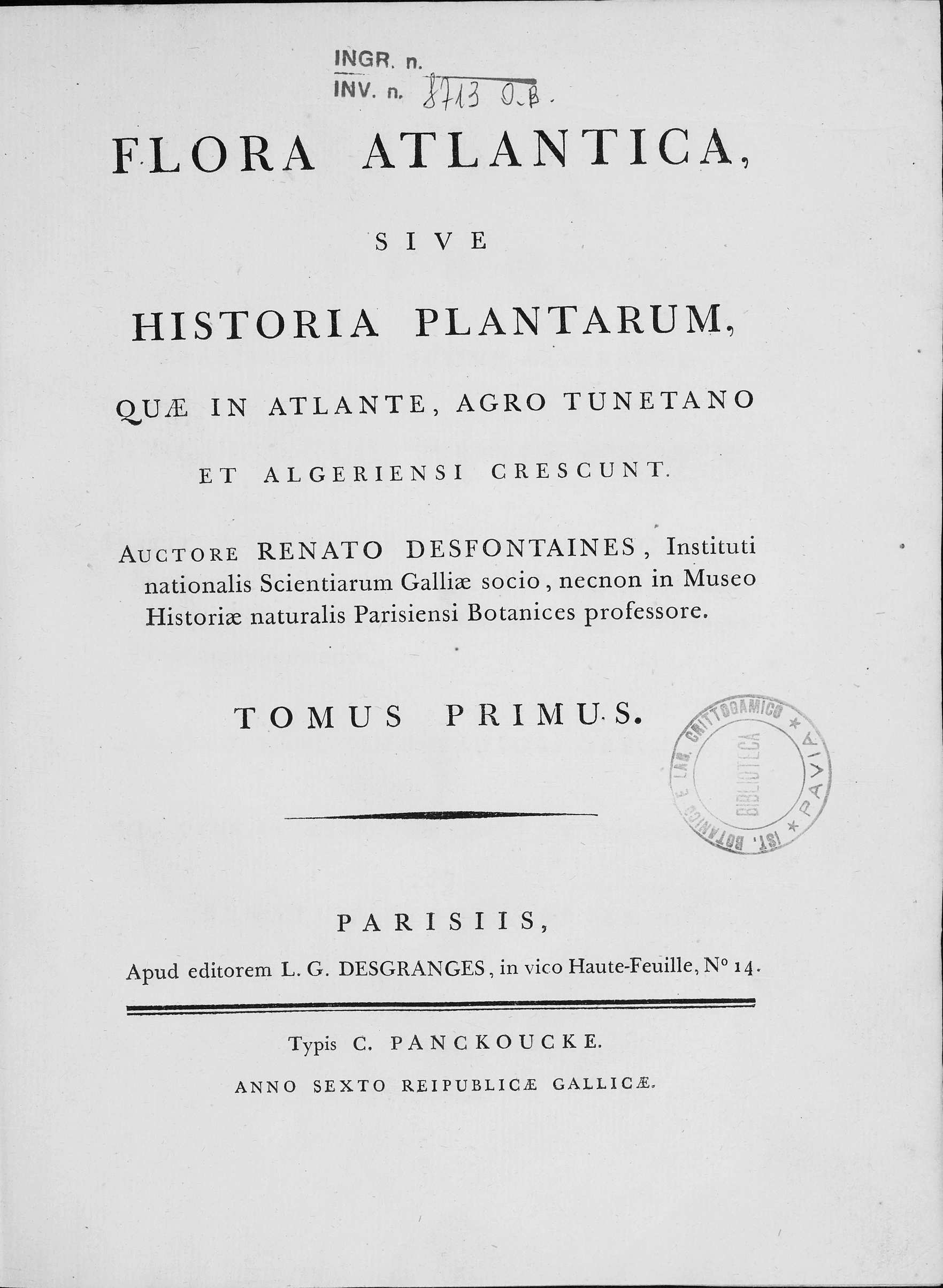
Flora atlantica, 1797

- Flora atlantica (in Latin). Vol. 1. Paris: Leopold Gregoire Desgranges. 1797.
- Flora atlantica (in Latin). Vol. 2. Paris: Leopold Gregoire Desgranges. 1798.
- Tableau de l'École de botanique du Muséum d'histoire naturelle (in French). Paris: J. A. Brosson. 1804.
