= List of former cantons of France =

This is a list of former cantons of France.

See List of cantons of France for cantons following the French canton reorganisation which came into effect in March 2015.

Canton	Département
Abbeville-Nord	Somme
Abbeville-Sud	Somme
Acheux-en-Amiénois	Somme
Aigrefeuille-d'Aunis	Charente-Maritime
Aiguilles	Hautes-Alpes
Ailly-le-Haut-Clocher	Somme
Aix-en-Provence-Centre	Bouches-du-Rhône
Aix-en-Provence-Sud-Ouest	Bouches-du-Rhône
Albertville-Nord	Savoie
Albertville-Sud	Savoie
Allos-Colmars	Alpes-de-Haute-Provence
Angers-Centre	Maine-et-Loire
Angers-Nord-Ouest	Maine-et-Loire
Anizy-le-Château	Aisne
Annot	Alpes-de-Haute-Provence
Anse-Bertrand	Guadeloupe
Antibes-Biot	Alpes-Maritimes
Antibes-Centre	Alpes-Maritimes
Archiac	Charente-Maritime
Ardres	Pas-de-Calais
Argelès-sur-Mer	Pyrénées-Orientales
Argentré-du-Plessis	Ille-et-Vilaine
Argent-sur-Sauldre	Cher
Argueil	Seine-Maritime
Arles-sur-Tech	Pyrénées-Orientales
Arques	Pas-de-Calais
Arras-Nord	Pas-de-Calais
Arras-Ouest	Pas-de-Calais
Arras-Sud	Pas-de-Calais
Aspres-sur-Buëch	Hautes-Alpes
Aubagne-Est	Bouches-du-Rhône
Aubagne-Ouest	Bouches-du-Rhône
Aubenton	Aisne
Aubigny-en-Artois	Pas-de-Calais
Audruicq	Pas-de-Calais
Ault	Somme
Aumale	Seine-Maritime
Auvillar	Tarn-et-Garonne
Avignon-Est	Vaucluse
Avignon-Nord	Vaucluse
Avignon-Ouest	Vaucluse
Avignon-Sud	Vaucluse
Bacqueville-en-Caux	Seine-Maritime
Bâgé-le-Châtel	Ain
Baie-Mahault	Guadeloupe
Bains-les-Bains	Vosges
Balleroy	Calvados
Banon	Alpes-de-Haute-Provence
Barcillonnette	Hautes-Alpes
Barlin	Pas-de-Calais
Barneville-Carteret	Manche
Barrême	Alpes-de-Haute-Provence
Basse-Pointe	Martinique
Bastia-5	Haute-Corse
Bastia-6	Haute-Corse
Baugy	Cher
Beaumes-de-Venise	Vaucluse
Beaumetz-lès-Loges	Pas-de-Calais
Beaumont-Hague	Manche
Beaune-la-Rolande	Loiret
Bécherel	Ille-et-Vilaine
Bédarieux	Hérault
Bédarrides	Vaucluse
Bellegarde-en-Marche	Creuse
Bellencombre	Seine-Maritime
Belmont-de-la-Loire	Loire
Bénévent-l'Abbaye	Creuse
Benfeld	Bas-Rhin
Bernaville	Somme
Bertincourt	Pas-de-Calais
Besançon-Planoise	Doubs
Béthune-Est	Pas-de-Calais
Béthune-Nord	Pas-de-Calais
Béthune-Sud	Pas-de-Calais
Bischheim	Bas-Rhin
Blangy-sur-Bresle	Seine-Maritime
Bonnieux	Vaucluse
Boos	Seine-Maritime
Bouillante	Guadeloupe
Boulogne-sur-Mer-Nord-Est	Pas-de-Calais
Boulogne-sur-Mer-Nord-Ouest	Pas-de-Calais
Boulogne-sur-Mer-Sud	Pas-de-Calais
Bourg-Argental	Loire
Bourg-de-Visa	Tarn-et-Garonne
Bourg-en-Bresse-Est	Ain
Bourg-en-Bresse-Nord-Centre	Ain
Bourg-en-Bresse-Sud	Ain
Boves	Somme
Braine	Aisne
Bray-sur-Seine	Seine-et-Marne
Bray-sur-Somme	Somme
Brénod	Ain
Briançon-Sud	Hautes-Alpes
Brie-Comte-Robert	Seine-et-Marne
Brouvelieures	Vosges
Buchy	Seine-Maritime
Bulgnéville	Vosges
Burie	Charente-Maritime
Cadenet	Vaucluse
Calais-Centre	Pas-de-Calais
Calais-Est	Pas-de-Calais
Calais-Nord-Ouest	Pas-de-Calais
Calais-Sud-Est	Pas-de-Calais
Cambrin	Pas-de-Calais
Campagne-lès-Hesdin	Pas-de-Calais
Cancale	Ille-et-Vilaine
Canet-en-Roussillon	Pyrénées-Orientales
Cany-Barville	Seine-Maritime
Capesterre-de-Marie-Galante	Guadeloupe
Carpentras-Nord	Vaucluse
Carpentras-Sud	Vaucluse
Case-Pilote-Bellefontaine	Martinique
Castelsarrasin-1	Tarn-et-Garonne
Castelsarrasin-2	Tarn-et-Garonne
Caudebec-en-Caux	Seine-Maritime
Caumont-l'Éventé	Calvados
Céret	Pyrénées-Orientales
Cérilly	Allier
Cesson-Sévigné	Ille-et-Vilaine
Chabanais	Charente
Chalamont	Ain
Chambéry-Sud	Savoie
Chambon-sur-Voueize	Creuse
Champagne-en-Valromey	Ain
Champtoceaux	Maine-et-Loire
Chantelle	Allier
Charenton-du-Cher	Cher
Charly-sur-Marne	Aisne
Châteaubourg	Ille-et-Vilaine
Château-Landon	Seine-et-Marne
Châteauneuf-de-Randon	Lozère
Châteauneuf-d'Ille-et-Vilaine	Ille-et-Vilaine
Châteauneuf-sur-Cher	Cher
Châteauneuf-sur-Sarthe	Maine-et-Loire
Châtellerault-Nord	Vienne
Châtellerault-Ouest	Vienne
Châtellerault-Sud	Vienne
Châtel-sur-Moselle	Vosges
Châtelus-Malvaleix	Creuse
Châtenois	Vosges
Chaulnes	Somme
Chazelles-sur-Lyon	Loire
Chénérailles	Creuse
Cherbourg-Octeville-Nord-Ouest	Manche
Cherbourg-Octeville-Sud-Est	Manche
Cherbourg-Octeville-Sud-Ouest	Manche
Chevagnes	Allier
Clères	Seine-Maritime
Cloyes-sur-le-Loir	Eure-et-Loir
Coligny	Ain
Collonges	Ain
Combles	Somme
Condé-en-Brie	Aisne
Conty	Somme
Coucy-le-Château-Auffrique	Aisne
Courçon	Charente-Maritime
Courrières	Pas-de-Calais
Coussey	Vosges
Craonne	Aisne
Crécy-en-Ponthieu	Somme
Crécy-la-Chapelle	Seine-et-Marne
Crécy-sur-Serre	Aisne
Criquetot-l'Esneval	Seine-Maritime
Crocq	Creuse
Croisilles	Pas-de-Calais
Cusset-Nord	Allier
Cusset-Sud	Allier
Dainville	Pas-de-Calais
Dammartin-en-Goële	Seine-et-Marne
Delme	Moselle
Dieppe-Est	Seine-Maritime
Dieppe-Ouest	Seine-Maritime
Digne-les-Bains-Est	Alpes-de-Haute-Provence
Digne-les-Bains-Ouest	Alpes-de-Haute-Provence
Dinard	Ille-et-Vilaine
Divion	Pas-de-Calais
Domart-en-Ponthieu	Somme
Domérat-Montluçon-Nord-Ouest	Allier
Dompaire	Vosges
Donnemarie-Dontilly	Seine-et-Marne
Doudeville	Seine-Maritime
Duclair	Seine-Maritime
Ducos	Martinique
Elne	Pyrénées-Orientales
Entrevaux	Alpes-de-Haute-Provence
Envermeu	Seine-Maritime
Escurolles	Allier
Ébreuil	Allier
Évreux-Est	Eure
Évreux-Nord	Eure
Évreux-Ouest	Eure
Évreux-Sud	Eure
Excideuil	Dordogne
Fauquembergues	Pas-de-Calais
Fauville-en-Caux	Seine-Maritime
Ferney-Voltaire	Ain
Florensac	Hérault
Fontaine-le-Dun	Seine-Maritime
Forges-les-Eaux	Seine-Maritime
Fougères-Nord	Ille-et-Vilaine
Fougères-Sud	Ille-et-Vilaine
Fraize	Vosges
Gaillon-Campagne	Eure
Gap-Campagne	Hautes-Alpes
Gap-Centre	Hautes-Alpes
Gap-Nord-Est	Hautes-Alpes
Gap-Nord-Ouest	Hautes-Alpes
Gap-Sud-Est	Hautes-Alpes
Gap-Sud-Ouest	Hautes-Alpes
Gentioux-Pigerolles	Creuse
Givors	Rhône
Goderville	Seine-Maritime
Gonfreville-l'Orcher	Seine-Maritime
Gordes	Vaucluse
Gourbeyre	Guadeloupe
Goyave	Guadeloupe
Graçay	Cher
Grand-Bourg	Guadeloupe
Grand-Couronne	Seine-Maritime
Grand-Fougeray	Ille-et-Vilaine
Gros-Morne	Martinique
Guéret-Nord	Creuse
Guéret-Sud-Est	Creuse
Guéret-Sud-Ouest	Creuse
Guillon	Yonne
Guînes	Pas-de-Calais
Hallencourt	Somme
Hédé	Ille-et-Vilaine
Hénin-Beaumont	Pas-de-Calais
Henrichemont	Cher
Hérisson	Allier
Hesdin	Pas-de-Calais
Heuchin	Pas-de-Calais
Hochfelden	Bas-Rhin
Hornoy-le-Bourg	Somme
Houdain	Pas-de-Calais
Hucqueliers	Pas-de-Calais
Isigny-sur-Mer	Calvados
Izernore	Ain
Jarnages	Creuse
La Bâtie-Neuve	Hautes-Alpes
La Capelle	Aisne
La Chapelle-d'Angillon	Cher
La Chapelle-la-Reine	Seine-et-Marne
La Conca-d'Oro	Haute-Corse
La Côte Radieuse	Pyrénées-Orientales
La Courtine	Creuse
La Désirade	Guadeloupe
La Fère	Aisne
La Ferté-Gaucher	Seine-et-Marne
La Grand-Croix	Loire
La Grave	Hautes-Alpes
La Javie	Alpes-de-Haute-Provence
La Motte-du-Caire	Alpes-de-Haute-Provence
La Pacaudière	Loire
La Trinité	Martinique
L'Aigle-Est	Orne
L'Ajoupa-Bouillon	Martinique
Lamarche	Vosges
Lanouaille	Dordogne
Laon-Nord	Aisne
Laon-Sud	Aisne
Laruns	Pyrénées-Atlantiques
Latour-de-France	Pyrénées-Orientales
Lauzerte	Tarn-et-Garonne
Laventie	Pas-de-Calais
Lavit	Tarn-et-Garonne
Le Buisson-de-Cadouin	Dordogne
Le Carbet	Martinique
Le Catelet	Aisne
Le Chambon-Feugerolles	Loire
Le Châtelet	Cher
Le Châtelet-en-Brie	Seine-et-Marne
Le Diamant	Martinique
Le Donjon	Allier
Le Lauzet-Ubaye	Alpes-de-Haute-Provence
Le Lorrain	Martinique
Le Marigot	Martinique
Le Marin	Martinique
Le Mée-sur-Seine	Seine-et-Marne
Le Monêtier-les-Bains	Hautes-Alpes
Le Montet	Allier
Le Morne-Rouge	Martinique
Le Nouvion-en-Thiérache	Aisne
Le Parcq	Pas-de-Calais
Le Portel	Pas-de-Calais
Le Prêcheur	Martinique
Le Vauclin	Martinique
Leforest	Pas-de-Calais
Lemberg	Moselle
Lens-Est	Pas-de-Calais
Lens-Nord-Est	Pas-de-Calais
Lens-Nord-Ouest	Pas-de-Calais
Léré	Cher
Les Aix-d'Angillon	Cher
Les Anses-d'Arlet	Martinique
Les Mées	Alpes-de-Haute-Provence
Les Saintes	Guadeloupe
Les Trois-Îlets	Martinique
Levet	Cher
Lhuis	Ain
Liévin-Nord	Pas-de-Calais
Liévin-Sud	Pas-de-Calais
Lignières	Cher
Lillebonne	Seine-Maritime
Lizy-sur-Ourcq	Seine-et-Marne
Londinières	Seine-Maritime
Longueville-sur-Scie	Seine-Maritime
Lorrez-le-Bocage-Préaux	Seine-et-Marne
Louvigné-du-Désert	Ille-et-Vilaine
Lurcy-Lévis	Allier
Lury-sur-Arnon	Cher
Macouba	Martinique
Malaucène	Vaucluse
Marcillat-en-Combraille	Allier
Marcq-en-Barœul	Nord
Maromme	Seine-Maritime
Marquion	Pas-de-Calais
Marquise	Pas-de-Calais
Marseille – Notre-Dame-du-Mont	Bouches-du-Rhône
Marseille – Notre-Dame-Limite	Bouches-du-Rhône
Marseille – Saint-Barthélemy	Bouches-du-Rhône
Marseille – Sainte-Marguerite	Bouches-du-Rhône
Marseille – Saint-Giniez	Bouches-du-Rhône
Marseille – Saint-Just	Bouches-du-Rhône
Marseille – Saint-Lambert	Bouches-du-Rhône
Marseille – Saint-Marcel	Bouches-du-Rhône
Marseille – Saint-Mauront	Bouches-du-Rhône
Marseille-Belsunce	Bouches-du-Rhône
Marseille-La Belle-de-Mai	Bouches-du-Rhône
Marseille-La Blancarde	Bouches-du-Rhône
Marseille-La Capelette	Bouches-du-Rhône
Marseille-La Pointe-Rouge	Bouches-du-Rhône
Marseille-La Pomme	Bouches-du-Rhône
Marseille-La Rose	Bouches-du-Rhône
Marseille-Le Camas	Bouches-du-Rhône
Marseille-Les Cinq-Avenues	Bouches-du-Rhône
Marseille-Les Grands-Carmes	Bouches-du-Rhône
Marseille-Les Olives	Bouches-du-Rhône
Marseille-Les Trois Lucs	Bouches-du-Rhône
Marseille-Mazargues	Bouches-du-Rhône
Marseille-Montolivet	Bouches-du-Rhône
Marseille-Vauban	Bouches-du-Rhône
Marseille-Verduron	Bouches-du-Rhône
Maure-de-Bretagne	Ille-et-Vilaine
Meaux-Nord	Seine-et-Marne
Meaux-Sud	Seine-et-Marne
Melun-Nord	Seine-et-Marne
Melun-Sud	Seine-et-Marne
Merville	Nord
Mézel	Alpes-de-Haute-Provence
Millas	Pyrénées-Orientales
Mirambeau	Charente-Maritime
Moissac-1	Tarn-et-Garonne
Moissac-2	Tarn-et-Garonne
Molliens-Dreuil	Somme
Montaigu-de-Quercy	Tarn-et-Garonne
Montauban-4	Tarn-et-Garonne
Montauban-5	Tarn-et-Garonne
Montauban-6	Tarn-et-Garonne
Montdidier	Somme
Montfaucon-Montigné	Maine-et-Loire
Montfort-l'Amaury	Yvelines
Monthureux-sur-Saône	Vosges
Montigny-en-Gohelle	Pas-de-Calais
Montivilliers	Seine-Maritime
Montlieu-la-Garde	Charente-Maritime
Mont-Louis	Pyrénées-Orientales
Montluçon-Est	Allier
Montluçon-Nord-Est	Allier
Montluçon-Ouest	Allier
Montluçon-Sud	Allier
Montluel	Ain
Montmarault	Allier
Montmoreau-Saint-Cybard	Charente
Montréal, Gers	Gers
Montreuil	Pas-de-Calais
Montrevel-en-Bresse	Ain
Mordelles	Ille-et-Vilaine
Moret-sur-Loing	Seine-et-Marne
Mormant	Seine-et-Marne
Mormoiron	Vaucluse
Moulins-Sud	Allier
Moustiers-Sainte-Marie	Alpes-de-Haute-Provence
Moÿ-de-l'Aisne	Aisne
Moyenneville	Somme
Néronde	Loire
Nérondes	Cher
Nesle	Somme
Neuf-Brisach	Haut-Rhin
Neufchâtel-sur-Aisne	Aisne
Neuilly-le-Réal	Allier
Neuilly-Saint-Front	Aisne
Noirétable	Loire
Noisiel	Seine-et-Marne
Nontron	Dordogne
Norrent-Fontes	Pas-de-Calais
Nouvion	Somme
Novion-Porcien	Ardennes
Noyelles-sous-Lens	Pas-de-Calais
Noyers-sur-Jabron	Alpes-de-Haute-Provence
Offranville	Seine-Maritime
Oisemont	Somme
Olargues	Hérault
Olette	Pyrénées-Orientales
Orange-Est	Vaucluse
Orange-Ouest	Vaucluse
Orcières	Hautes-Alpes
Orpierre	Hautes-Alpes
Oulchy-le-Château	Aisne
Ourville-en-Caux	Seine-Maritime
Oyonnax-Nord	Ain
Oyonnax-Sud	Ain
Pas-en-Artois	Pas-de-Calais
Pavilly	Seine-Maritime
Péronnas	Ain
Perreux	Loire
Perthes	Seine-et-Marne
Peyruis	Alpes-de-Haute-Provence
Picquigny	Somme
Pipriac	Ille-et-Vilaine
Pleine-Fougères	Ille-et-Vilaine
Plélan-le-Grand	Ille-et-Vilaine
Pleumartin	Vienne
Plombières-les-Bains	Vosges
Pointe-Noire	Guadeloupe
Poncin	Ain
Pontarion	Creuse
Pont-de-Vaux	Ain
Pont-de-Veyle	Ain
Prades	Pyrénées-Orientales
Prats-de-Mollo-la-Preste	Pyrénées-Orientales
Preuilly-sur-Claise	Indre-et-Loire
Provenchères-sur-Fave	Vosges
Puiseaux	Loiret
Quillebeuf-sur-Seine	Eure
Rambervillers	Vosges
Rebais	Seine-et-Marne
Rémuzat	Drôme
Rennes-Brequigny	Ille-et-Vilaine
Rennes-Centre	Ille-et-Vilaine
Rennes-Centre-Ouest	Ille-et-Vilaine
Rennes-Centre-Sud	Ille-et-Vilaine
Rennes-Est	Ille-et-Vilaine
Rennes-le-Blosne	Ille-et-Vilaine
Rennes-Nord	Ille-et-Vilaine
Rennes-Nord-Est	Ille-et-Vilaine
Rennes-Nord-Ouest	Ille-et-Vilaine
Rennes-Sud-Est	Ille-et-Vilaine
Rennes-Sud-Ouest	Ille-et-Vilaine
Retiers	Ille-et-Vilaine
Reyrieux	Ain
Ribiers	Hautes-Alpes
Rivesaltes	Pyrénées-Orientales
Rivière-Pilote	Martinique
Rivière-Salée	Martinique
Roanne-Nord	Loire
Roanne-Sud	Loire
Roisel	Somme
Roissy-en-Brie	Seine-et-Marne
Romilly-sur-Seine-1	Aube
Romilly-sur-Seine-2	Aube
Roquevaire	Bouches-du-Rhône
Rosans	Hautes-Alpes
Rosières-en-Santerre	Somme
Roubaix-Est	Nord
Roujan	Hérault
Rouvroy	Pas-de-Calais
Royère-de-Vassivière	Creuse
Rozay-en-Brie	Seine-et-Marne
Rozoy-sur-Serre	Aisne
Ryes	Calvados
Saillagouse	Pyrénées-Orientales
Sains-en-Gohelle	Pas-de-Calais
Sains-Richaumont	Aisne
Saint-André-les-Alpes	Alpes-de-Haute-Provence
Saint-Antonin-Noble-Val	Tarn-et-Garonne
Saint-Aubin-d'Aubigné	Ille-et-Vilaine
Saint-Aubin-du-Cormier	Ille-et-Vilaine
Saint-Benoît-du-Sault	Indre
Saint-Bonnet-le-Château	Loire
Saint-Brice-en-Coglès	Ille-et-Vilaine
Saint-Chamond-Nord	Loire
Saint-Chamond-Sud	Loire
Saint-Chinian	Hérault
Saint-Claude, Guadeloupe	Guadeloupe
Saint-Cyprien	Dordogne
Saint-Dié-des-Vosges-Est	Vosges
Sainte-Anne	Martinique
Sainte-Luce	Martinique
Saintes-Maries-de-la-Mer	Bouches-du-Rhône
Saint-Esprit	Martinique
Saint-Étienne-en-Dévoluy	Hautes-Alpes
Saint-Étienne-les-Orgues	Alpes-de-Haute-Provence
Saint-Étienne-Nord-Est-1	Loire
Saint-Étienne-Sud-Est-1	Loire
Saint-Étienne-Sud-Est-2	Loire
Saint-Étienne-Sud-Est-3	Loire
Saint-Étienne-Sud-Ouest-1	Loire
Saint-Étienne-Sud-Ouest-2	Loire
Saint-Firmin	Hautes-Alpes
Saint-Galmier	Loire
Saint-Genest-Malifaux	Loire
Saint-Gengoux-le-National	Saône-et-Loire
Saint-Georges-en-Couzan	Loire
Saint-Germain-Laval	Loire
Saint-Gervais-sur-Mare	Hérault
Saint-Haon-le-Châtel	Loire
Saint-Héand	Loire
Saint-Jean-Soleymieux	Loire
Saint-Joseph	Martinique
Saint-Just-en-Chevalet	Loire
Saint-Laurent-de-la-Salanque	Pyrénées-Orientales
Saint-Laurent-du-Var-Cagnes-sur-Mer-Est	Alpes-Maritimes
Saint-Louis, Guadeloupe	Guadeloupe
Saint-Malo-Nord	Ille-et-Vilaine
Saint-Malo-Sud	Ille-et-Vilaine
Saint-Martin-de-Ré	Charente-Maritime
Saint-Méen-le-Grand	Ille-et-Vilaine
Saint-Nicolas-de-la-Grave	Tarn-et-Garonne
Saint-Nom-la-Bretèche	Yvelines
Saint-Omer-Nord	Pas-de-Calais
Saint-Omer-Sud	Pas-de-Calais
Saint-Paul-de-Fenouillet	Pyrénées-Orientales
Saint-Paul-Trois-Châteaux	Drôme
Saint-Pierre	Martinique
Saint-Quentin-Centre	Aisne
Saint-Rambert-en-Bugey	Ain
Saint-Saëns	Seine-Maritime
Saint-Savinien	Charente-Maritime
Saint-Sever-Calvados	Calvados
Saint-Simon	Aisne
Saint-Sulpice-les-Champs	Creuse
Saint-Symphorien-de-Lay	Loire
Saint-Thégonnec	Finistère
Saint-Trivier-de-Courtes	Ain
Saint-Trivier-sur-Moignans	Ain
Saint-Valery-sur-Somme	Somme
Samer	Pas-de-Calais
Sancergues	Cher
Sancoins	Cher
Sault	Vaucluse
Saulxures-sur-Moselotte	Vosges
Saulzais-le-Potier	Cher
Savines-le-Lac	Hautes-Alpes
Séderon	Drôme
Senones	Vosges
Seyssel, Ain	Ain
Sissonne	Aisne
Sotteville-lès-Rouen-Est	Seine-Maritime
Sotteville-lès-Rouen-Ouest	Seine-Maritime
Soultz-Haut-Rhin	Haut-Rhin
Sournia	Pyrénées-Orientales
Tarascon	Bouches-du-Rhône
Thann	Haut-Rhin
Thoissey	Ain
Thorigny-sur-Marne	Seine-et-Marne
Thuir	Pyrénées-Orientales
Tinténiac	Ille-et-Vilaine
Tonnay-Boutonne	Charente-Maritime
Tôtes	Seine-Maritime
Toulouges	Pyrénées-Orientales
Tournan-en-Brie	Seine-et-Marne
Tournon-Saint-Martin	Indre
Treffort-Cuisiat	Ain
Troyes-6	Aube
Troyes-7	Aube
Turriers	Alpes-de-Haute-Provence
Vailly-sur-Aisne	Aisne
Vailly-sur-Sauldre	Cher
Vaires-sur-Marne	Seine-et-Marne
Valmont	Seine-Maritime
Vénissieux-Nord	Rhône
Vénissieux-Sud	Rhône
Vermand	Aisne
Vigeois (Limousin)	Corrèze
Vihiers	Maine-et-Loire
Villebois-Lavalette	Charente
Villefranche-sur-Mer	Alpes-Maritimes
Villeneuve-l'Archevêque	Yonne
Villers-Bocage, Calvados	Calvados
Villers-Bocage, Somme	Somme
Villiers-Saint-Georges	Seine-et-Marne
Vimy	Pas-de-Calais
Vinça	Pyrénées-Orientales
Viriat	Ain
Virieu-le-Grand	Ain
Vitré-Est	Ille-et-Vilaine
Vitré-Ouest	Ille-et-Vilaine
Vitry-en-Artois	Pas-de-Calais
Volonne	Alpes-de-Haute-Provence
Wassigny	Aisne
Yerville	Seine-Maritime
