= Arrondissement of Rennes =

Coordinates: 48°07′N 1°41′W

Rennes
- Arrondissement
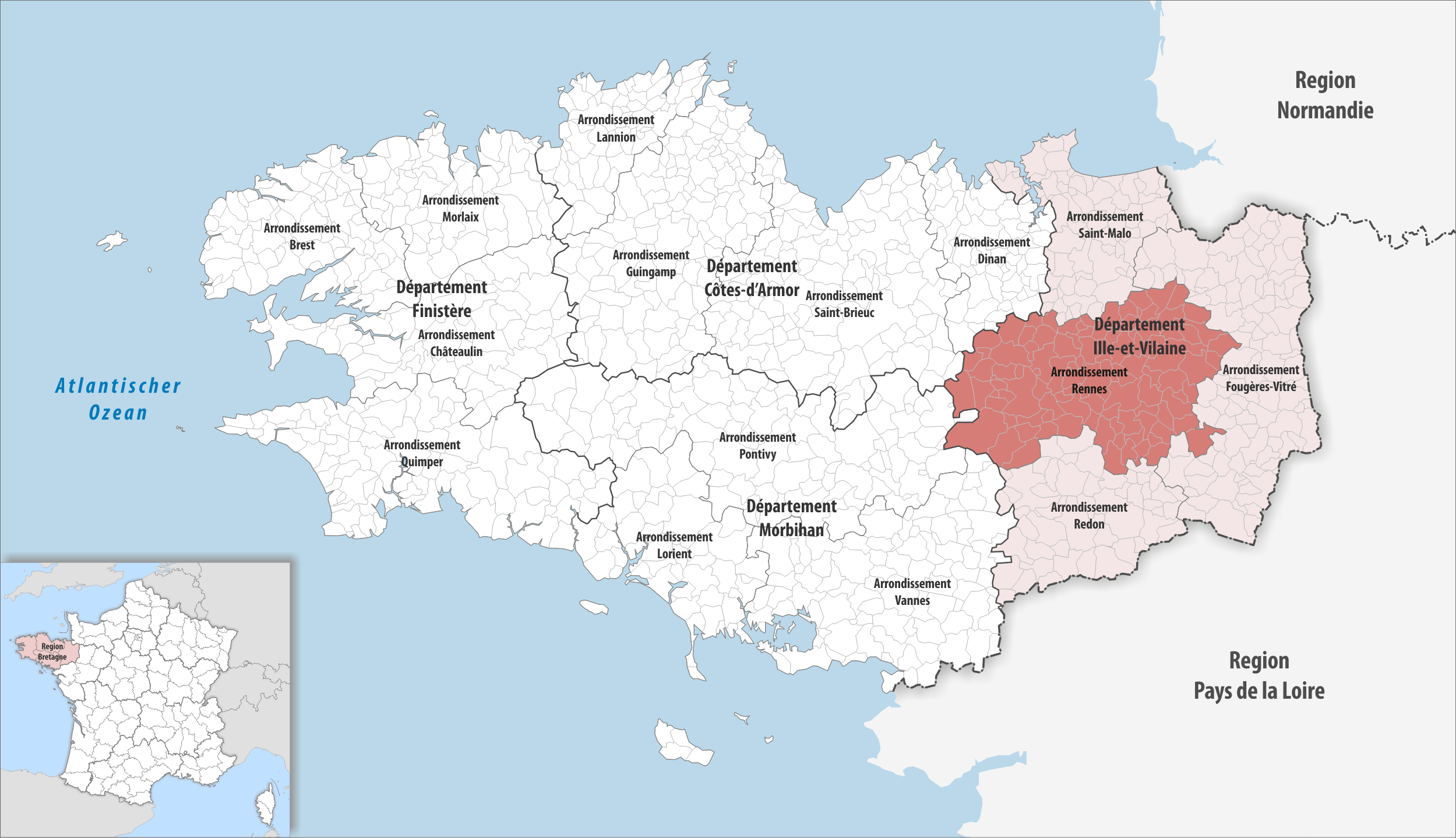
- Location within the region Brittany
- Country: France
- Region: Brittany
- Department: Ille-et-Vilaine
- No. of communes: {{{nbcomm}}}
- Area: 2,228.4 km^{2} (860.4 sq mi)
- Population (2023): 649,829
  - Density: 291.61/km^{2} (755.27/sq mi)
- INSEE code: 353

The arrondissement of Rennes is an arrondissement of France in the Ille-et-Vilaine department in the Brittany region. It has 109 communes. Its population is 633,702 (2021), and its area is 2,228.4 km^{2} (860.4 sq mi).

== Composition ==
The communes of the arrondissement of Rennes, and their INSEE codes, are:

1. Acigné (35001)
2. Andouillé-Neuville (35003)
3. Aubigné (35007)
4. Bécherel (35022)
5. Bédée (35023)
6. Betton (35024)
7. Bléruais (35026)
8. Boisgervilly (35027)
9. La Bouëxière (35031)
10. Bourgbarré (35032)
11. Bréal-sous-Montfort (35037)
12. Brécé (35039)
13. Breteil (35040)
14. Bruz (35047)
15. Cesson-Sévigné (35051)
16. Chantepie (35055)
17. La Chapelle-Chaussée (35058)
18. La Chapelle-des-Fougeretz (35059)
19. La Chapelle-du-Lou-du-Lac (35060)
20. La Chapelle-Thouarault (35065)
21. Chartres-de-Bretagne (35066)
22. Chasné-sur-Illet (35067)
23. Châteaugiron (35069)
24. Chavagne (35076)
25. Chevaigné (35079)
26. Cintré (35080)
27. Clayes (35081)
28. Corps-Nuds (35088)
29. Le Crouais (35091)
30. Domloup (35099)
31. Dourdain (35101)
32. Ercé-près-Liffré (35107)
33. Feins (35110)
34. Gaël (35117)
35. Gahard (35118)
36. Gévezé (35120)
37. Gosné (35121)
38. Guipel (35128)
39. L'Hermitage (35131)
40. Iffendic (35133)
41. Irodouër (35135)
42. Laillé (35139)
43. Landujan (35143)
44. Langan (35144)
45. Langouet (35146)
46. Liffré (35152)
47. Livré-sur-Changeon (35154)
48. Maxent (35169)
49. Médréac (35171)
50. Melesse (35173)
51. La Mézière (35177)
52. Mézières-sur-Couesnon (35178)
53. Miniac-sous-Bécherel (35180)
54. Montauban-de-Bretagne (35184)
55. Monterfil (35187)
56. Montfort-sur-Meu (35188)
57. Montgermont (35189)
58. Montreuil-le-Gast (35193)
59. Montreuil-sur-Ille (35195)
60. Mordelles (35196)
61. Mouazé (35197)
62. Muel (35201)
63. La Nouaye (35203)
64. Nouvoitou (35204)
65. Noyal-Châtillon-sur-Seiche (35206)
66. Noyal-sur-Vilaine (35207)
67. Orgères (35208)
68. Pacé (35210)
69. Paimpont (35211)
70. Parthenay-de-Bretagne (35216)
71. Piré-Chancé (35220)
72. Plélan-le-Grand (35223)
73. Pleumeleuc (35227)
74. Pont-Péan (35363)
75. Quédillac (35234)
76. Rennes (35238)
77. Le Rheu (35240)
78. Romillé (35245)
79. Saint-Armel (35250)
80. Saint-Aubin-d'Aubigné (35251)
81. Saint-Aubin-du-Cormier (35253)
82. Saint-Erblon (35266)
83. Saint-Germain-sur-Ille (35274)
84. Saint-Gilles (35275)
85. Saint-Gondran (35276)
86. Saint-Gonlay (35277)
87. Saint-Grégoire (35278)
88. Saint-Jacques-de-la-Lande (35281)
89. Saint-Malon-sur-Mel (35290)
90. Saint-Maugan (35295)
91. Saint-Médard-sur-Ille (35296)
92. Saint-Méen-le-Grand (35297)
93. Saint-Onen-la-Chapelle (35302)
94. Saint-Péran (35305)
95. Saint-Pern (35307)
96. Saint-Sulpice-la-Forêt (35315)
97. Saint-Symphorien (35317)
98. Saint-Thurial (35319)
99. Saint-Uniac (35320)
100. Sens-de-Bretagne (35326)
101. Servon-sur-Vilaine (35327)
102. Talensac (35331)
103. Thorigné-Fouillard (35334)
104. Treffendel (35340)
105. Le Verger (35351)
106. Vern-sur-Seiche (35352)
107. Vezin-le-Coquet (35353)
108. Vieux-Vy-sur-Couesnon (35355)
109. Vignoc (35356)

== History ==
The arrondissement of Rennes was created in 1800. In 2010 it lost the six cantons of Argentré-du-Plessis, Châteaubourg, La Guerche-de-Bretagne, Retiers, Vitré-Est and Vitré-Ouest to the new arrondissement of Fougères-Vitré. At the January 2017 reorganisation of the arrondissements of Ille-et-Vilaine, it gained four communes from the arrondissement of Fougères-Vitré and one commune from the arrondissement of Redon, and it lost five communes to the arrondissement of Fougères-Vitré and seven communes to the arrondissement of Saint-Malo.

As a result of the reorganisation of the cantons of France which came into effect in 2015, the borders of the cantons are no longer related to the borders of the arrondissements. The cantons of the arrondissement of Rennes were, as of January 2015:

1. Bécherel
2. Betton
3. Bruz
4. Cesson-Sévigné
5. Châteaugiron
6. Hédé
7. Janzé
8. Liffré
9. Montauban-de-Bretagne
10. Montfort-sur-Meu
11. Mordelles
12. Plélan-le-Grand
13. Rennes-Brequigny
14. Rennes-Centre
15. Rennes-Centre-Ouest
16. Rennes-Centre-Sud
17. Rennes-Est
18. Rennes-le-Blosne
19. Rennes-Nord
20. Rennes-Nord-Est
21. Rennes-Nord-Ouest
22. Rennes-Sud-Est
23. Rennes-Sud-Ouest
24. Saint-Aubin-d'Aubigné
25. Saint-Méen-le-Grand
