= Brie, Ille-et-Vilaine =

Brie Beriy (Gallo) Brev (Breton)
- Commune
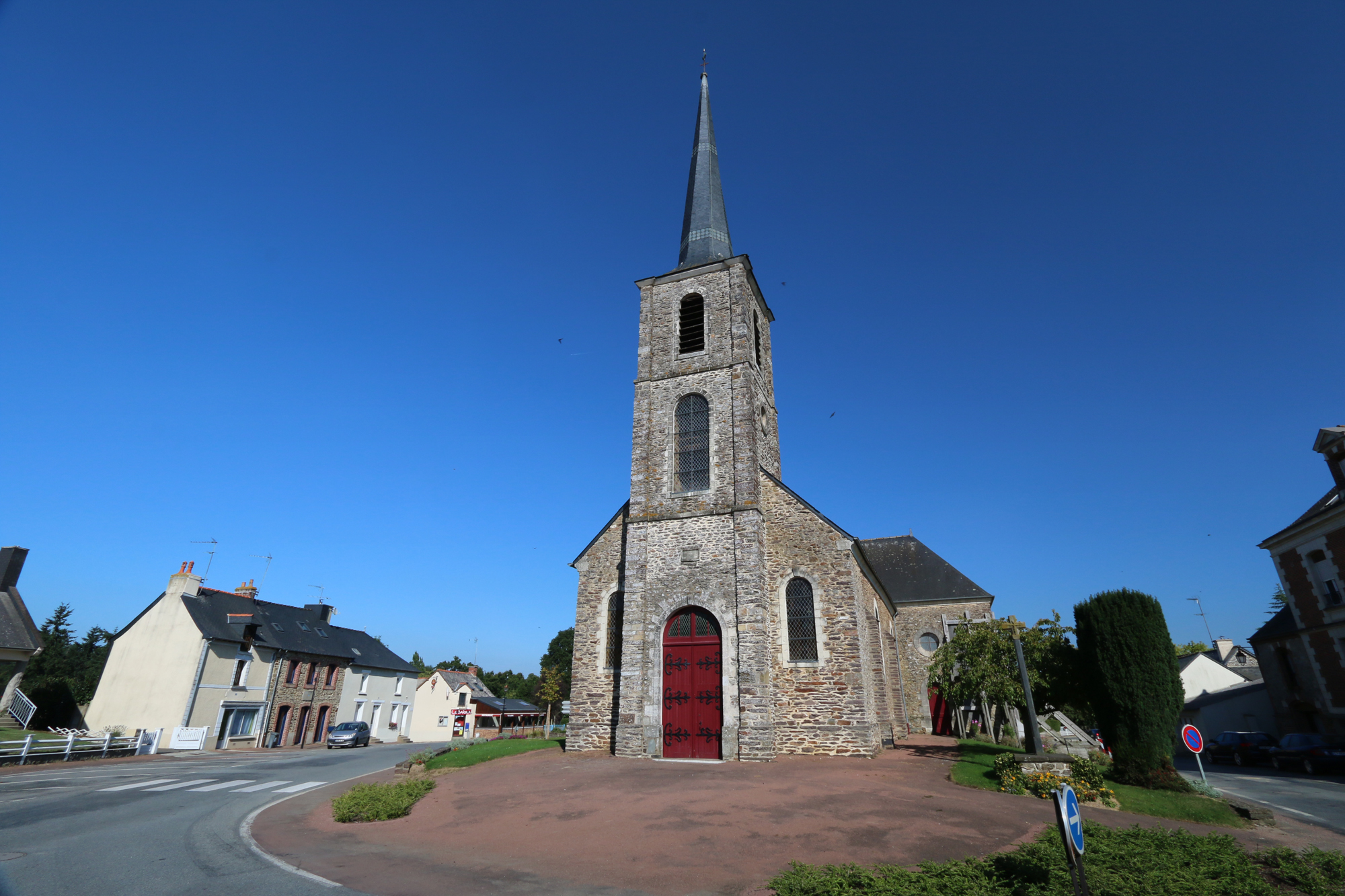
- The church of Brie

- Coat of arms
- Location of Brie
- Location within France Location within Brittany
- Coordinates: 47°57′10″N 1°32′10″W
- Country: France
- Region: Brittany
- Department: Ille-et-Vilaine
- Arrondissement: Fougères-Vitré
- Canton: Janzé
- Intercommunality: Roche-aux-Fées

Government
  - Mayor (2026–32): Bruno Pelletier
- Area^{1}: 13.56 km^{2} (5.24 sq mi)
- Highest elevation: 113 m (371 ft)
- Lowest elevation: 45 m (148 ft)
- Population (2023): 988
  - Density: 72.9/km^{2} (189/sq mi)
- Time zone: UTC+01:00 (CET)
  - Summer (DST): UTC+02:00 (CEST)
- INSEE/Postal code: 35041 /35150
- ^{1} French Land Register data, which excludes lakes, ponds, glaciers > 1 km^{2} (0.386 sq mi or 247 acres) and river estuaries.

Brie (French pronunciation: [bʁi]; Breton: Brev; Gallo: Beriy) is a commune in the Ille-et-Vilaine department in Brittany in northwestern France.

== Geography ==
The bordering municipalities are: Janzé, Saulnières, Chanteloup and Corps-Nuds.

== History ==
The name of the locality is attested in Plebs Beria forms in 1096, Berie in 1240, and Beria in 1516. The origin of the word is the Celtic briva or brieria "bridge", or Gallic briga, "fortified height".

== Heraldry ==
The coat of arms shows argent with three crenellated fasces of sand. The official status of the coat of arms remains to be determined.

== Gallery ==
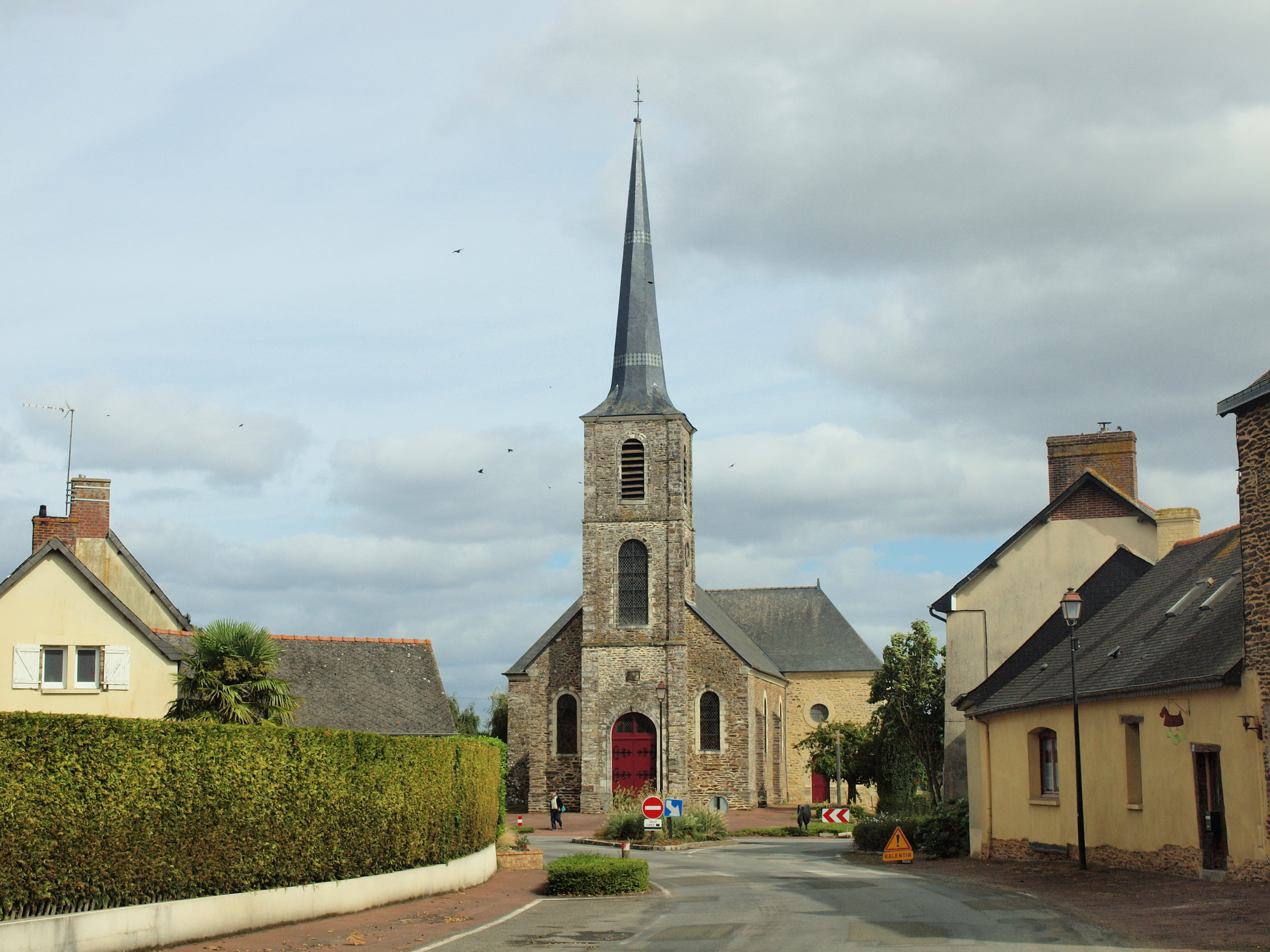
Brie church

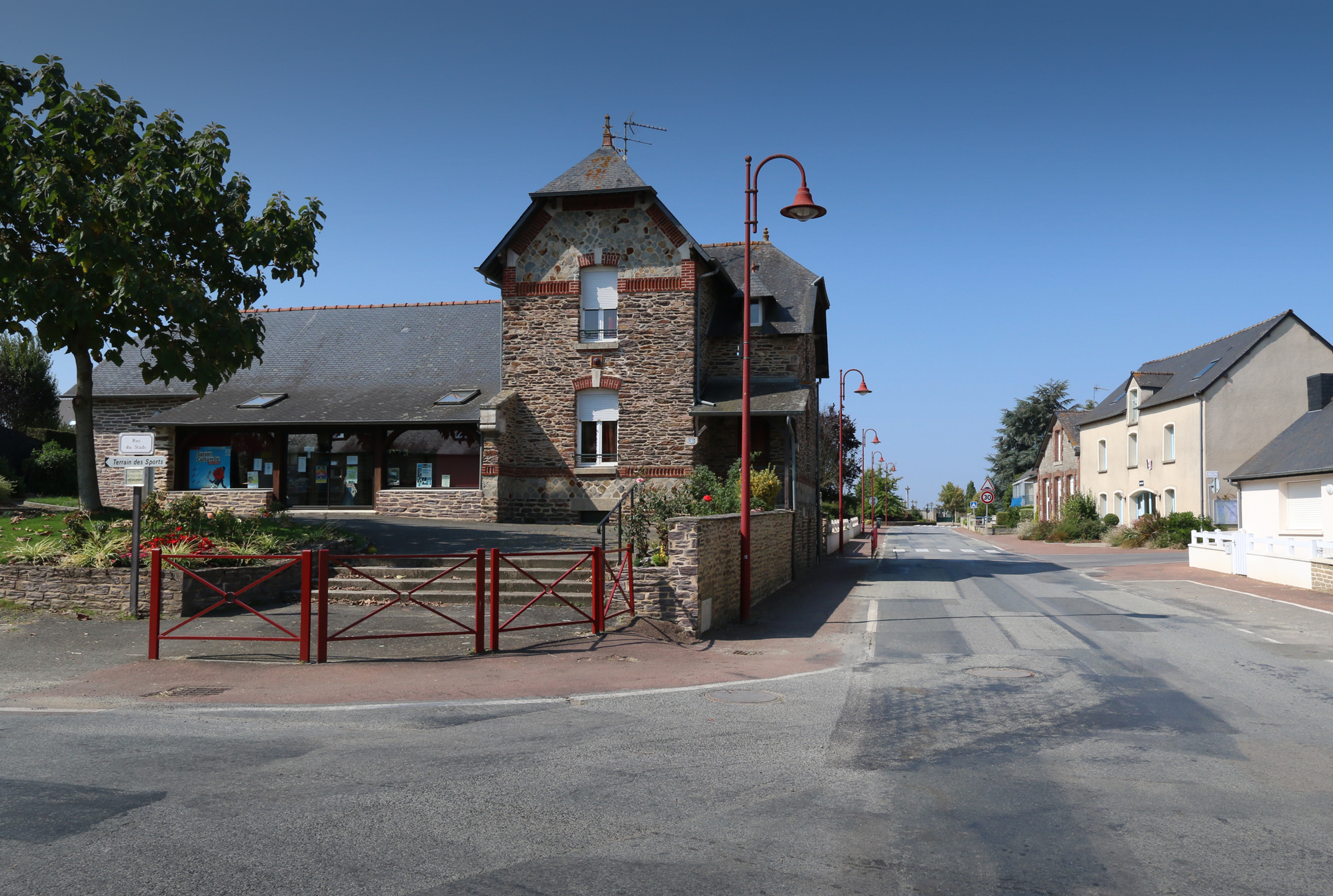
Brie-biblio1.

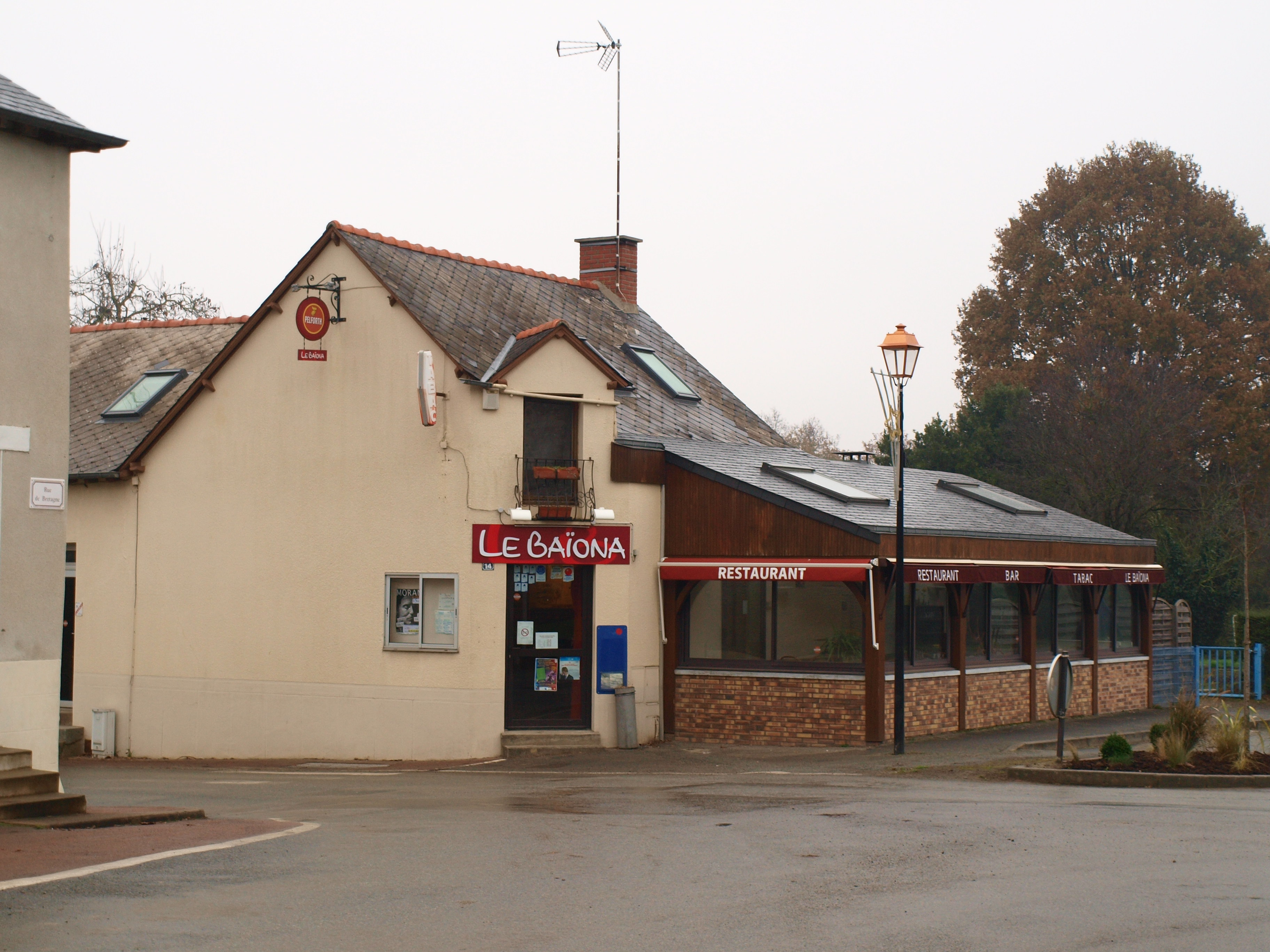
Brie Street scene

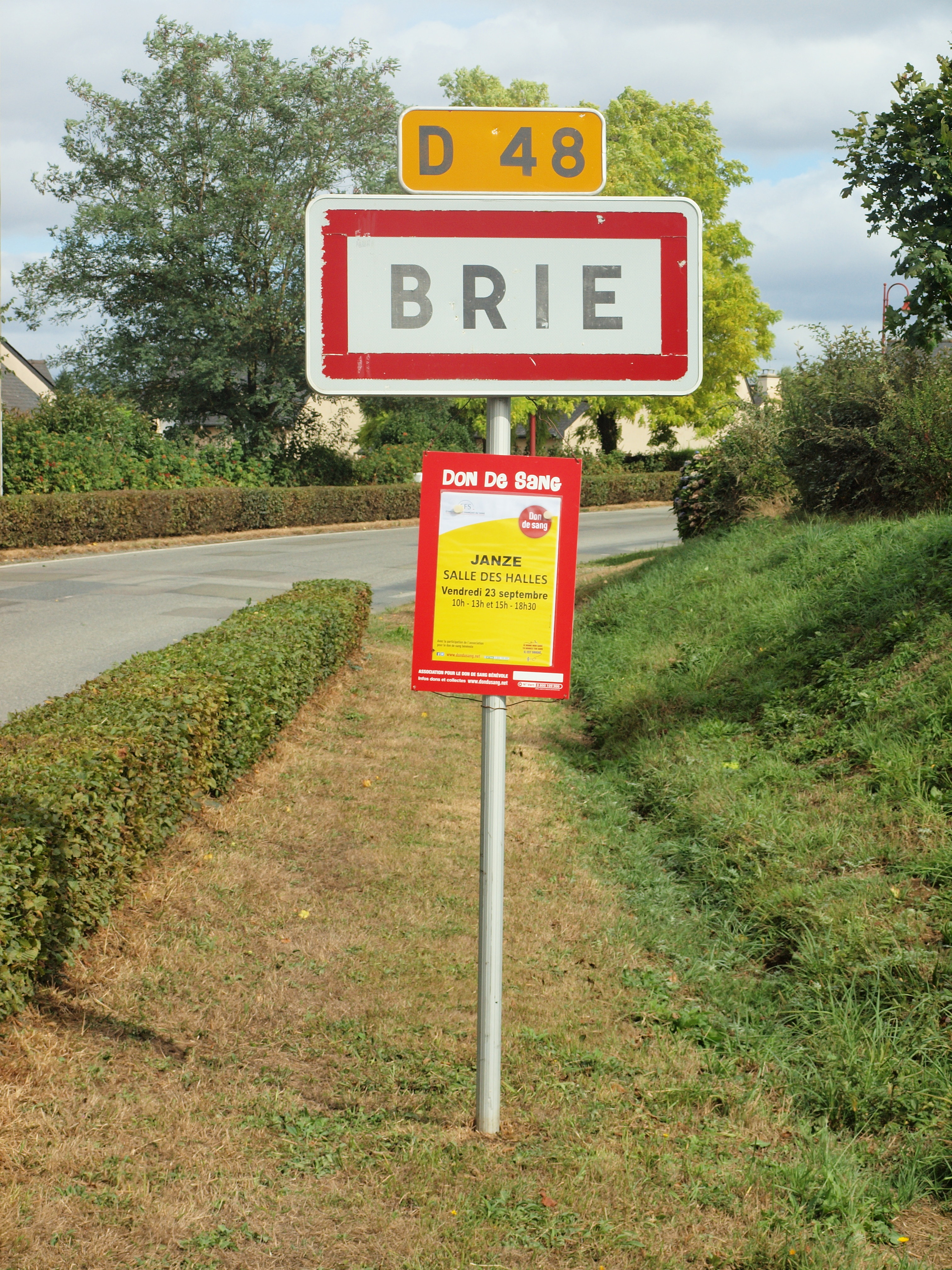
Brie Street scene

== Population ==
Inhabitants of Brie are called Briens in French.

Historical population
| Year | Pop. | ±% p.a. |
|---|---|---|
| 1968 | 504 | — |
| 1975 | 419 | −2.60% |
| 1982 | 512 | +2.91% |
| 1990 | 576 | +1.48% |
| 1999 | 698 | +2.16% |
| 2007 | 774 | +1.30% |
| 2012 | 848 | +1.84% |
| 2017 | 950 | +2.30% |
| 2023 | 988 | +0.66% |
Source: INSEE

== See also ==
- Communes of the Ille-et-Vilaine department
