= Hervé Gauthier =

French footballer and coach (born 1949)

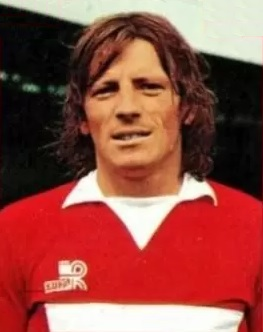

Personal information
- Full name: Hervé Gauthier in 1975.
- Date of birth: 28 May 1949 (age 77)
- Place of birth: Janzé, France
- Position: Defender

Youth career
- 1962–1970: Janzé

Senior career*
Years	Team	Apps	(Gls)
1970–1973	Poitiers	82	(16)
1973–1977	Lille	126	(25)
1977–1982	Laval	177	(7)
1982–1984	RC Paris		

Managerial career
- 1984–1985: FC Yonnais
- 1986–1987: Millau
- 1988–1994: Angers
- 1997: Lille
- 1997–2001: Laval
- 2001–2002: Caen
- 2002–2004: Wasquehal
- 2008: Étoile du Sahel
- * Club domestic league appearances and goals

Hervé Gauthier (born 28 May 1949) is a retired French footballer and coach.

He played for Stade Poitevin, Lille OSC, Stade Lavallois and RC Paris.

After his playing career, Gauthier became a coach with Ligue 1 and Ligue 2 clubs, such as Lille OSC and SM Caen.
