= Canton of Roubaix-Est =

Former canton of France

Coordinates: 50°42′03″N 3°11′31″E

- Former canton
- Interactive map of Canton of Roubaix-Est
- Country: France
- Region: Hauts-de-France
- Department: Nord
- No. of communes: {{{nbcomm}}}
- Disbanded: 2015
- Population (2012): 31,644

The Canton of Roubaix-Est is a former French canton, located in the Nord department in the former region of Nord-Pas-de-Calais (now part of Hauts-de-France).

== Composition ==
The canton of Roubaix-Est consisted of two communes of Roubaix and Wattrelos. It had 31,644 inhabitants (municipal population) as of January 1, 2012.

== History ==
The canton of Roubaix-Est was created in 1867, by dividing the former canton of Roubaix. After the cantonal reorganisation of 2014, Roubaix-Est, along with Roubaix-Centre, Roubaix-Nord and Roubaix-Ouest, merged and split again to become the cantons of Roubaix-1 and Roubaix-2.

Mehdi Massrour (PS) was the last general councilor elected from canton, since 2011.

== See also ==
- List of former cantons of France
