= Bourgbarré =

Bourgbarré Bórg-Baraé (Gallo) Bourvarred (Breton)
- Commune
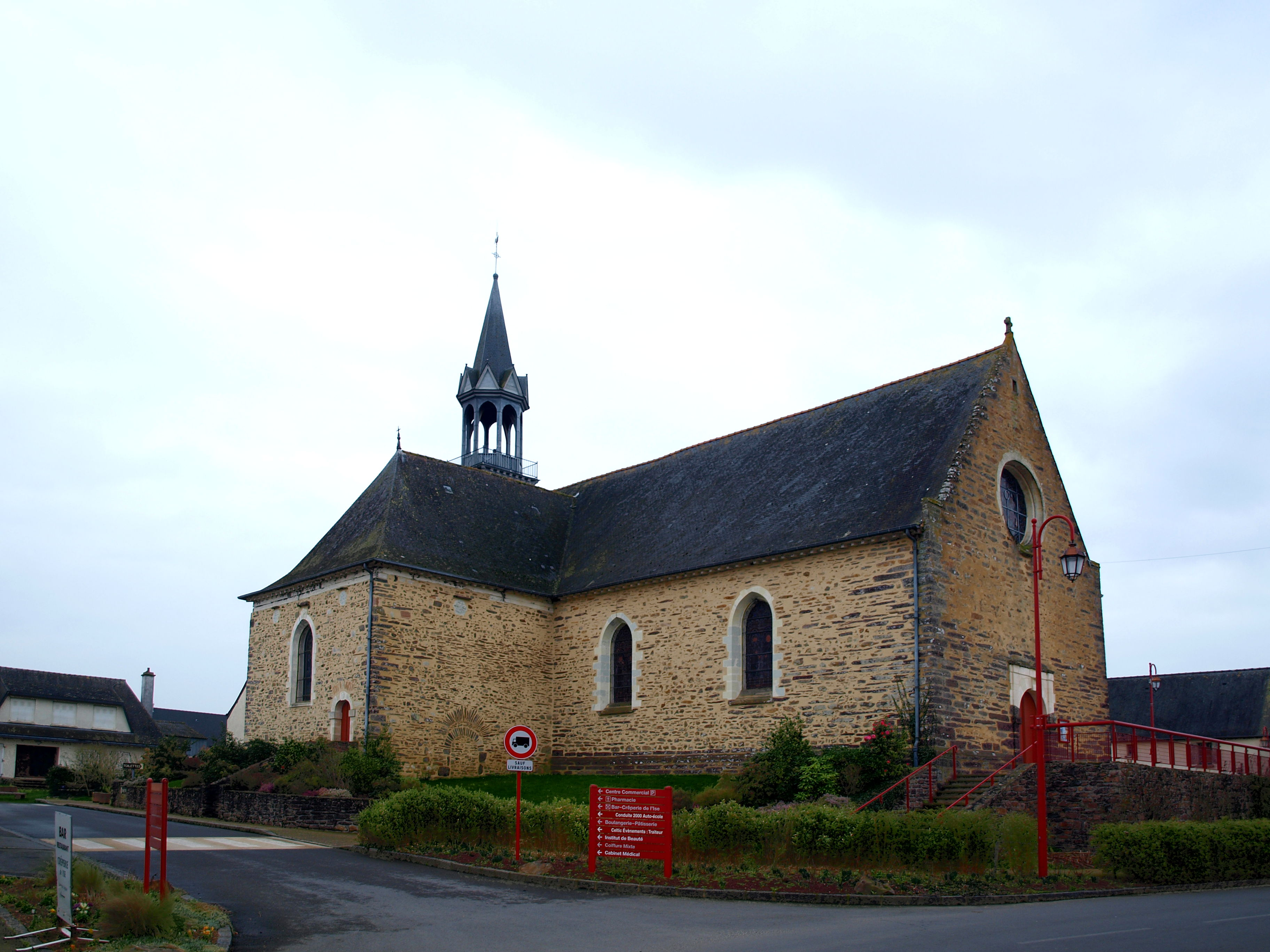
- The church of Bourgbarré

- Coat of arms
- Location of Bourgbarré
- Location within France Location within Brittany
- Coordinates: 47°59′42″N 1°36′48″W
- Country: France
- Region: Brittany
- Department: Ille-et-Vilaine
- Arrondissement: Rennes
- Canton: Janzé
- Intercommunality: Rennes Métropole

Government
  - Mayor (2020–2026): Franck Morvan
- Area^{1}: 14.20 km^{2} (5.48 sq mi)
- Highest elevation: 104 m (341 ft)
- Lowest elevation: 27 m (89 ft)
- Population (2023): 4,804
  - Density: 338.3/km^{2} (876.2/sq mi)
- Time zone: UTC+01:00 (CET)
  - Summer (DST): UTC+02:00 (CEST)
- INSEE/Postal code: 35032 /35230
- ^{1} French Land Register data, which excludes lakes, ponds, glaciers > 1 km^{2} (0.386 sq mi or 247 acres) and river estuaries.

Bourgbarré (French pronunciation: [buʁbaʁe]; Breton: Bourvarred; Gallo: Bórg-Baraé) is a commune in the Ille-et-Vilaine department in Brittany in northwestern France.

== Population ==
Inhabitants of Bourgbarré are called Bourgbarréens in French.

Historical population
Year	Pop.	±% p.a.
1968	855	—
1975	1,139	+4.18%
1982	1,709	+5.97%
1990	2,004	+2.01%
1999	2,322	+1.65%
2007	3,044	+3.44%
2012	3,644	+3.66%
2017	4,132	+2.55%
2023	4,804	+2.54%
Source: INSEE

== See also ==
- Communes of the Ille-et-Vilaine department
