= Orgères, Ille-et-Vilaine =

Orgères Orjèrr (Gallo) An Heizeg (Breton)
- Commune
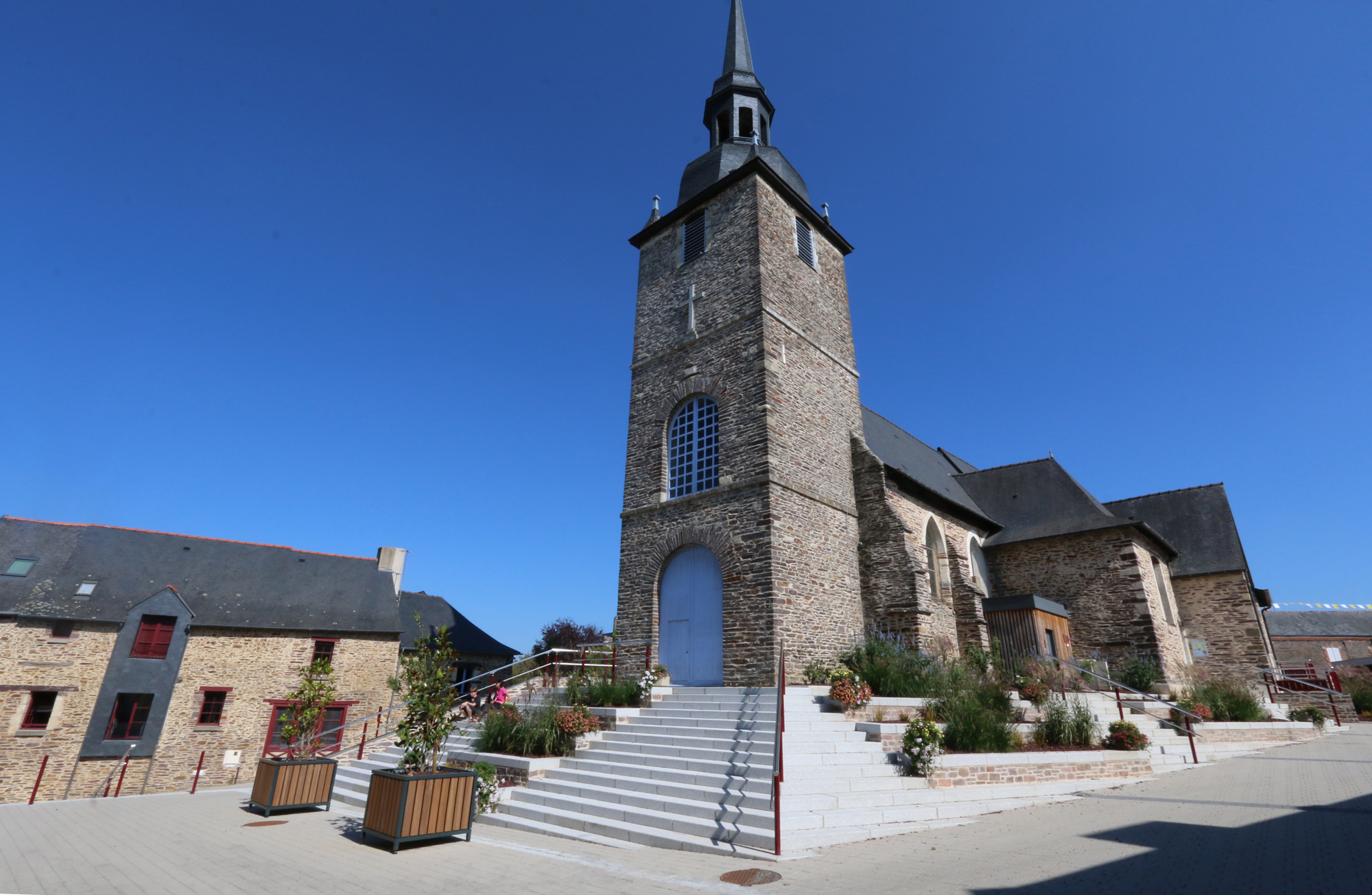
- The church of Saint-Martin, in Orgères
- Location of Orgères
- Location within France Location within Brittany
- Coordinates: 47°59′59″N 1°40′00″W
- Country: France
- Region: Brittany
- Department: Ille-et-Vilaine
- Arrondissement: Rennes
- Canton: Janzé
- Intercommunality: Rennes Métropole

Government
  - Mayor (2022–2026): Yannick Cochaud
- Area^{1}: 16.33 km^{2} (6.31 sq mi)
- Highest elevation: 111 m (364 ft)
- Lowest elevation: 26 m (85 ft)
- Population (2023): 5,732
  - Density: 351.0/km^{2} (909.1/sq mi)
- Time zone: UTC+01:00 (CET)
  - Summer (DST): UTC+02:00 (CEST)
- INSEE/Postal code: 35208 /35230
- ^{1} French Land Register data, which excludes lakes, ponds, glaciers > 1 km^{2} (0.386 sq mi or 247 acres) and river estuaries.

Orgères (French pronunciation: [ɔʁʒɛʁ]; Breton: An Heizeg; Gallo: Orjèrr) is a commune in the Ille-et-Vilaine department in Brittany in northwestern France.

== Population ==
Inhabitants of Orgères are called Orgérois in French.

Historical population
Year	Pop.	±% p.a.
1968	1,064	—
1975	1,708	+7.00%
1982	2,175	+3.51%
1990	2,537	+1.94%
1999	2,881	+1.42%
2007	3,605	+2.84%
2012	4,059	+2.40%
2017	4,729	+3.10%
2023	5,732	+3.26%
Source: INSEE

== See also ==
- Communes of the Ille-et-Vilaine department
