= Janzé =

Janzé Janzae (Gallo) Gentieg (Breton)
- Commune
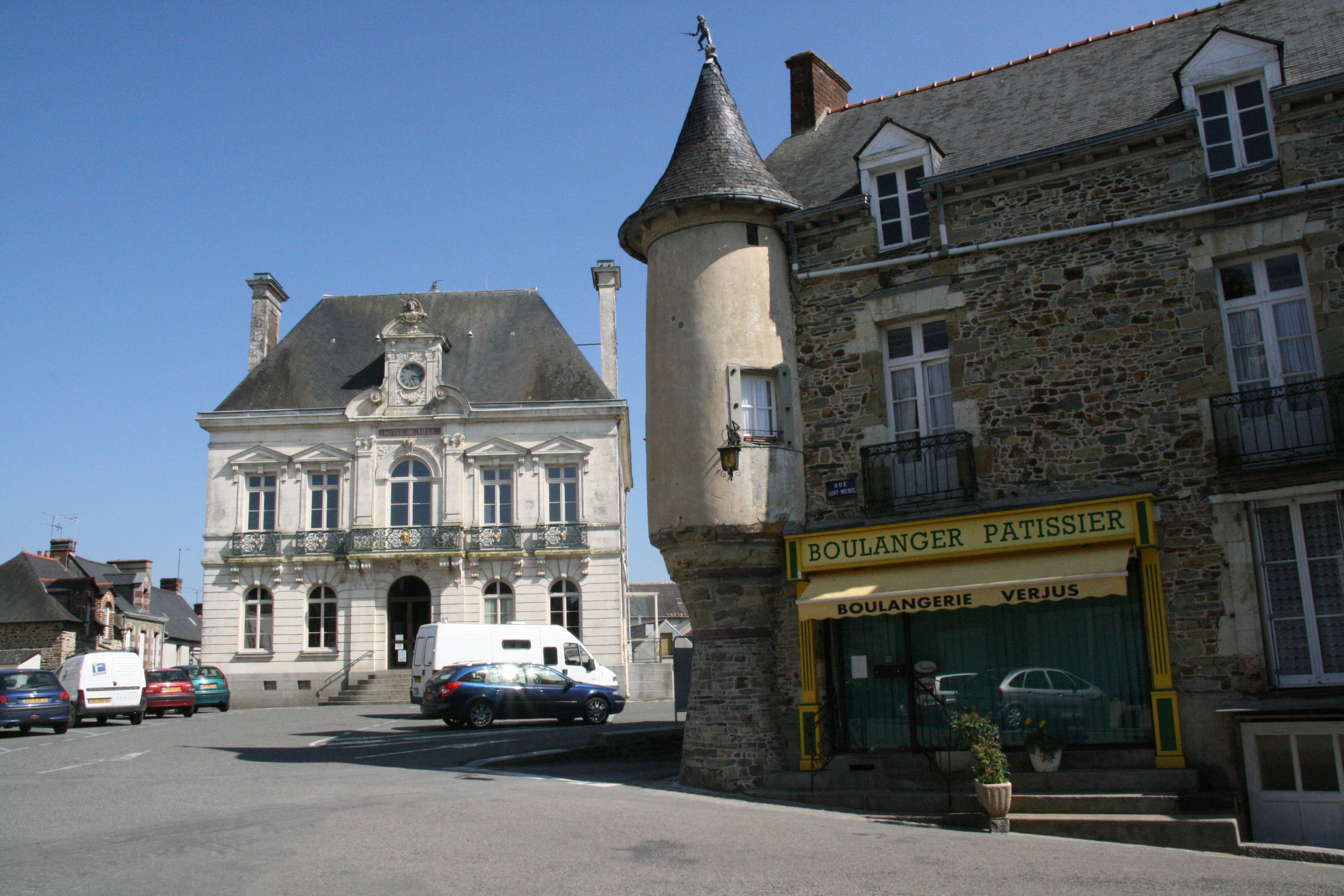
- Town hall and old house with turret

- Coat of arms
- Location of Janzé
- Location within France Location within Brittany
- Coordinates: 47°57′41″N 1°29′52″W
- Country: France
- Region: Brittany
- Department: Ille-et-Vilaine
- Arrondissement: Fougères-Vitré
- Canton: Janzé
- Intercommunality: Roche aux Fées Communauté

Government
  - Mayor (2020–2026): Hubert Paris
- Area^{1}: 41.26 km^{2} (15.93 sq mi)
- Highest elevation: 117 m (384 ft)
- Lowest elevation: 31 m (102 ft)
- Population (2023): 8,649
  - Density: 209.6/km^{2} (542.9/sq mi)
- Time zone: UTC+01:00 (CET)
  - Summer (DST): UTC+02:00 (CEST)
- INSEE/Postal code: 35136 /35150
- ^{1} French Land Register data, which excludes lakes, ponds, glaciers > 1 km^{2} (0.386 sq mi or 247 acres) and river estuaries.

Janzé (Breton: Gentieg, Gallo: Janzae) is a commune in the Ille-et-Vilaine department in Brittany in northwestern France. It is also the seat of the Canton of Janzé. The inhabitants of Janzé are called Janzéens in French.

Early historical evidence points to the settlement of the area by Gallic tribes before the Roman occupation. Two Christian parishes were established in the 11th and 13th centuries.

After the French Revolution, Janzé became an important center of agriculture and commerce and is currently well known for its poultry industry.

Among its sites of interest are two official French Historical Monuments (Monument Historique): the menhir called The Fairies' Rock (La Pierre des Fées) and the Church of Saint Martin (Eglise Saint-Martin).

== Geography ==
Janzé is located approximately 16 miles southeast of Rennes, the capital of Brittany, at the junction of highways D41 and D777. The countryside is hilly and dotted with farms, orchards and small woods.

== History ==
Beginning with the Roman occupation of Gaul up to the 10th century, Janzé was called Janziacum. The name is thought to come perhaps from the gallo language word "jan" (a type of shrub) or from the name of the Roman god Janus or from Gennitius (a Gallo-Roman name) plus the suffix -acum. The name changed to Janzéium, Janzay or Janzey and then finally to Janzé from 1216 on.

The existence of menhirs in the area of modern-day Janzé is an indication that Gallic tribes settled in the area long before the arrival of the Romans in Armorica. Beginning in 58 BC, the Romans occupied the area known as Gallia Celtica for some 400 years. During this time, Christianity was introduced by monks from the Marmoutier Abbey, Tours. The parish of Saint-Martin was established by the Abbey by the end of the 11th century. Another parish, Saint-Pierre, was founded sometime before 1216. In the Middle Ages, Janzé was controlled by the nobility of the nearby town of Brie.

During the French Revolution, the clerics of Saint-Martin agreed to swear allegiance to the new government, but the priests of Saint-Pierre refused, so the two parishes were combined under the name of Saint-Martin. In the 19th century, a new parish church was built and given the name Church of the Sacred Heart of Jesus (Eglise du Sacré-Cœur de Jésus). It is now one of 13 churches in the Parish of Saint Anne in Janzé (Paroisse Sainte-Anne en pays de Janzé).

After the Revolution, Janzé was an important market for sailcloth produced from hemp grown in the surrounding countryside. It also became famous for poulardes, which by 1900 were being served on transatlantic sailing ships. Other notable agricultural products included grain - rye, wheat, oats and buckwheat - and apples used to make cider. A station on the Rennes-Châteaubriant rail line was opened in 1881. This enabled the town to expand its markets toward the south.

During World War I, 187 men of Janzé were killed in battle. A war memorial (Monuments aux Morts) in their honor was erected in 1920. Later, 20 names of soldiers fallen during World War II were added, along with five names from the Indochina Wars and the Algerian War. Janzé was occupied by the Germans during World War II from 18 June 1940 until 3 August 1944, when the town was liberated by the American army.

Janzé continues to be a center of agriculture and commerce in Brittany. In addition to grains and apple cider, farmers became known for their dairy and other agricultural products. The local poultry industry goes back at least to the 18th century, when the black chickens of the area were mentioned in a Breton dictionary. In 1980 the Janzé Poultry Association (Association du Poulet de Janzé) was created, and the first Label Rouge (Red Label) indicating a superior product was awarded. By 1996, the association achieved the status of Protected Geographical Indication or IGP (fr:Indication géographique protégée) reflecting the importance of the Janzé brand. Most recently, the farmers began offering organic poultry following strict guidelines. With the increasing interest in organic farming, it was discovered that the black chickens of Janzé are particularly good at eating insects that can decimate orchards, thus avoiding the need for chemical pesticides.

== Language and culture ==
The traditional culture of Brittany remains important to the inhabitants of the region. Before the introduction of compulsory education in French, the Breton language was widely spoken in the western part of the region, while the Latinate Gallo language was typically spoken in the eastern part around Rennes, which includes Janzé. Gallo is currently spoken by some 28,000 people, mostly in rural areas.

As the French language gained dominance throughout the country, local dialects like Gallo came to be called Patois. The word patois tends to have a pejorative meaning because these dialects were typically associated with uneducated rural classes, in contrast with the dominant "prestige language" (Standard French) spoken by the upper classes in cities, or as used in literature and formal settings. However, it can be argued that the local languages retained their "old" words and pronunciations simply because the way of life in the countryside stayed much the same over the centuries.

== Population ==
Historical population

Year	Pop.	±% p.a.
1793	3,296	—
1851	4,722	+0.62%
1881	4,810	+0.06%
1926	4,048	−0.38%
1962	3,948	−0.07%
1968	4,158	+0.87%
1975	4,248	+0.31%

Year	Pop.	±% p.a.
1982	4,327	+0.26%
1990	4,500	+0.49%
1999	5,364	+1.97%
2007	7,711	+4.64%
2012	8,250	+1.36%
2017	8,279	+0.07%
2023	8,649	+0.73%

Source: EHESS and INSEE (1968-2023)

== Administration ==
Janzé is the seat of the Canton of Janzé, which from 1801 to 2014 included six communes. In 2015, the canton was expanded to include ten communes.

The commune of Janzé is part of the Roche aux Fées Communauté de communes, which is made up of 16 communes.

As of 2020, the current mayor of Janzé is Hubert Paris. The deputy mayors are François Goiset, Anne Joulain, Pierric Morel, Elisabeth Barre-Villeneuve, Dominique Cornillaud, Isabelle Ceze, Jean-Paul Botrel, and Martine Pigeon.

== Education ==
There are six schools (private and public) in Janzé.

== Transport ==
- Bus service to Rennes and nearby smaller cities is provided by the regional transportation service BreizhGo.
- SNCF (the French national railway company) provides service to Rennes through its Transport express régional or TER network. The Gare de Rennes, a major railway station, provides high-speed rail service to Paris and other cities in France, plus regional service throughout Brittany.
- The nearest airport is Rennes–Saint-Jacques Airport, approximately 17 miles from Janzé.

== Sites of interest ==
- The Church of the Sacred Heart of Jesus (Eglise du Sacré-Cœur de Jésus). From 1874 to 1885, a neo-Romanesque church designed by architects Jules and Henri Mellet was built to replace the old church of Saint-Martin that dated from the Middle Ages. The church was designated as an official Monument Historique in 2016 under the name Eglise Saint-Martin.
- War Memorial (Monument aux Morts). Installed in 1920 to honor local soldiers who died in World War I, the memorial features a Gallic rooster and also includes the names of the fallen from World War II, the Indochina Wars and the Algerian War.
- The Château de la Franceule. A priory existed in this location dating back to the 12th century. When the building was destroyed by fire in 1905, the owner built the current brick and stone chateau, which now belongs to the sisters of Saint-Cyr. This building is indexed in the Base Mérimée, a database of architectural heritage maintained by the French Ministry of Culture, under the reference IA35046234.
- Gristmill at la Franceule. The existence of a mill on the Seiche River at La Franceule dates back to at least 1280. Beginning in the early 19th century, the mill had a paddle wheel measuring 6 meters in diameter and 2.50 meters wide. This paddle wheel, which is still in place, originally drove two stone grindstones. A steam engine was added in 1875. This was replaced by a gas engine in 1925, then by an electric motor in 1942. The stone grindstones were replaced by a mechanism in steel. The mill was used until 1995. The facility is currently used as an animal feed factory. The mill is listed in the Base Mérimée under the reference IA35000529.
- The Château de la Jaroussaye. Parts of the building were built in the 15th century. It currently houses the MFR (Maison Familiale Rurale) agricultural trade school. The main building is listed in the Base Mérimée under the reference IA35046299.
- La Pierre des Fées. A large (14 feet tall) purple schist Neolithic menhir or "standing stone" located 3 miles southwest of the town of Janzé. The menhir was designated as an official Monument Historique in 1963.

== Gallery ==
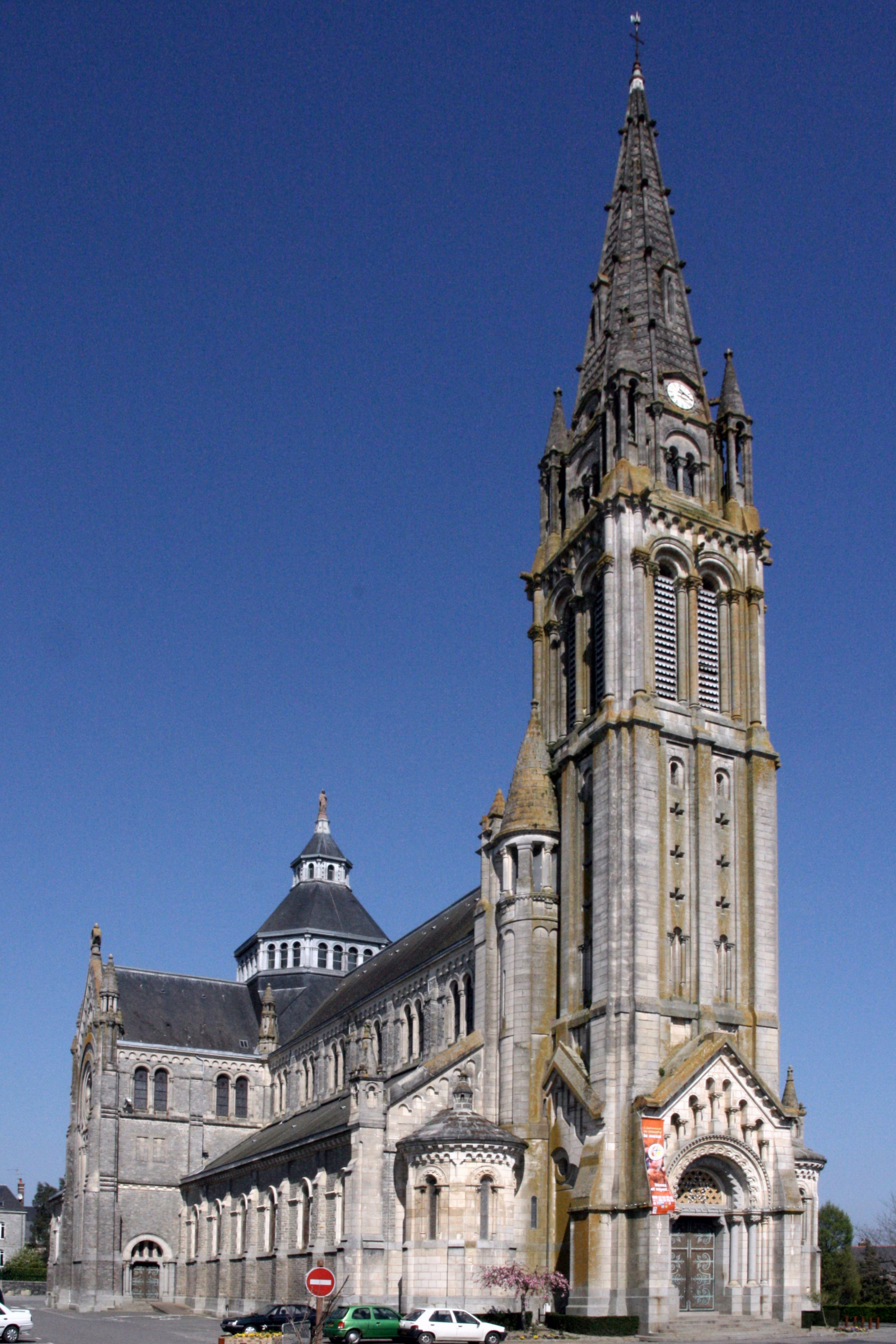
Church

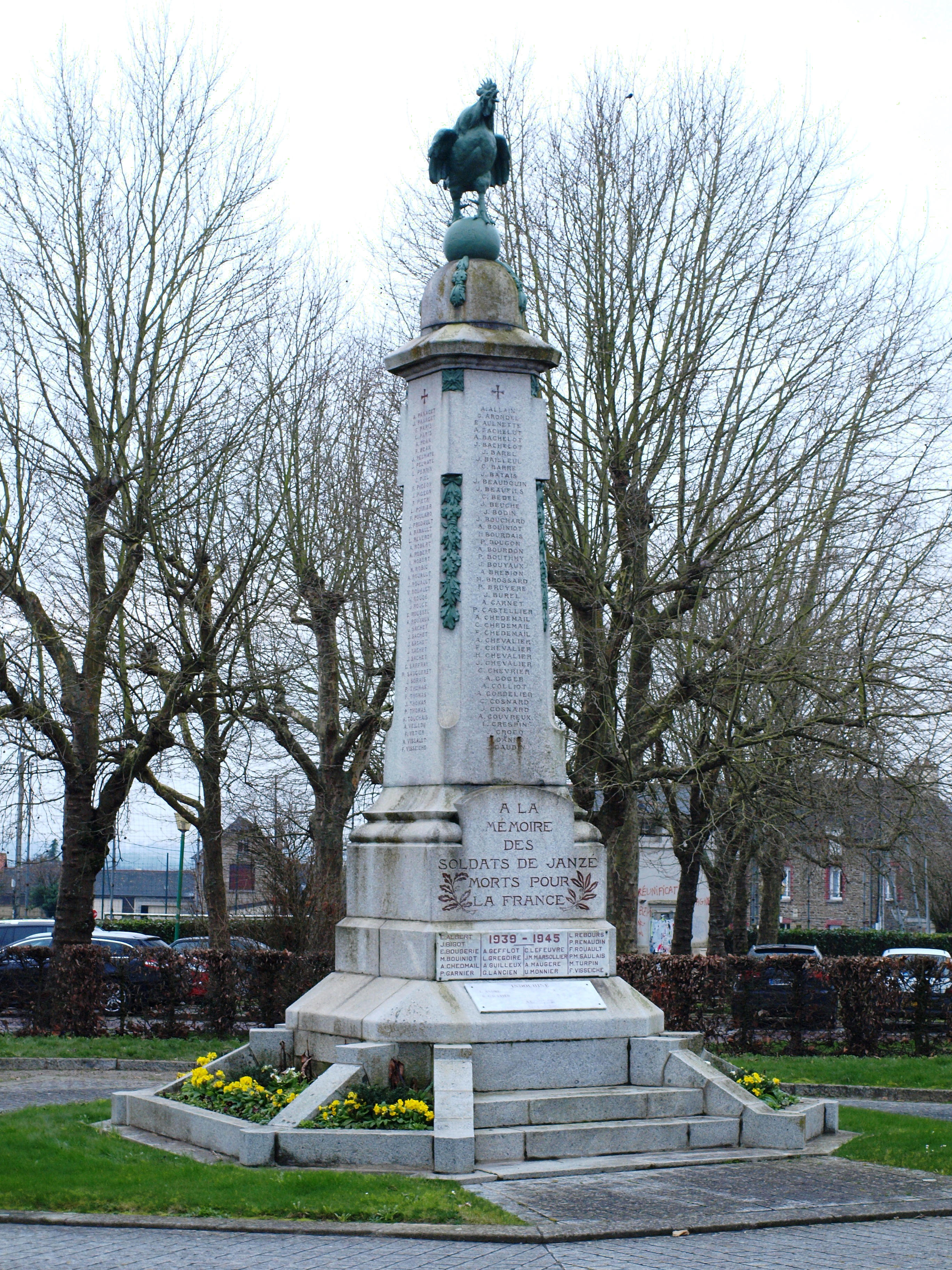
War Memorial

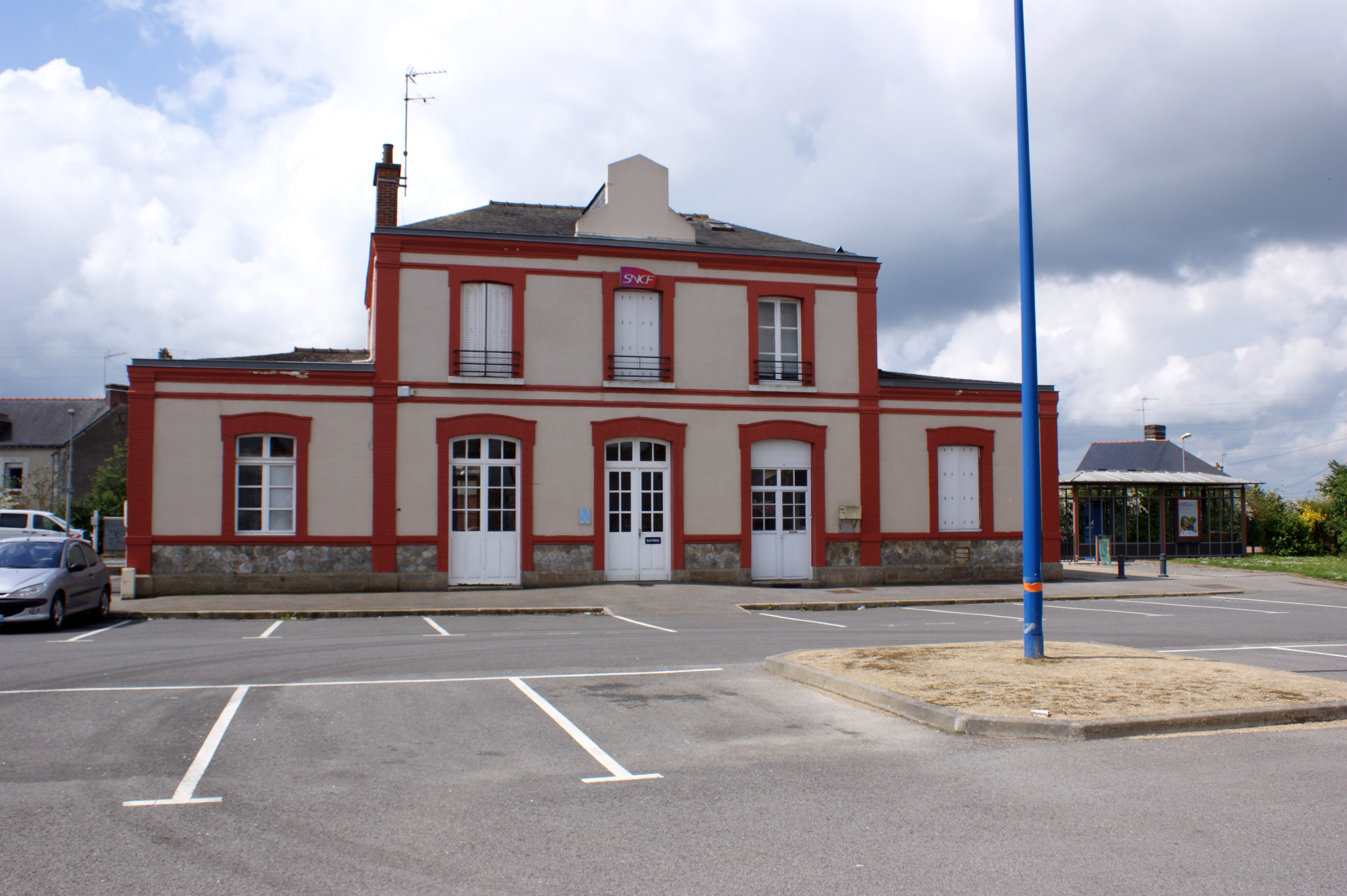
Railway Station

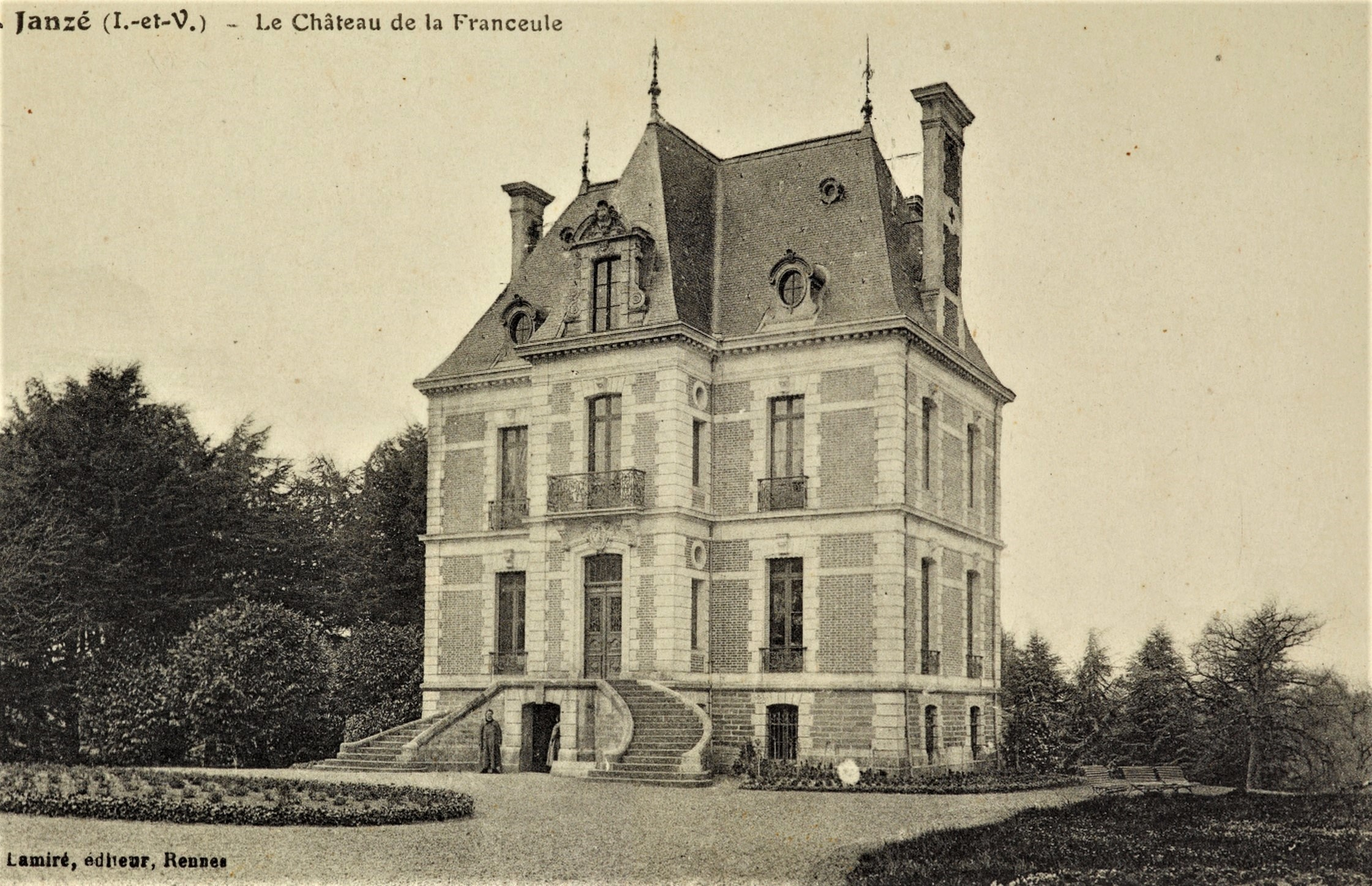
Chateau de la Franceule

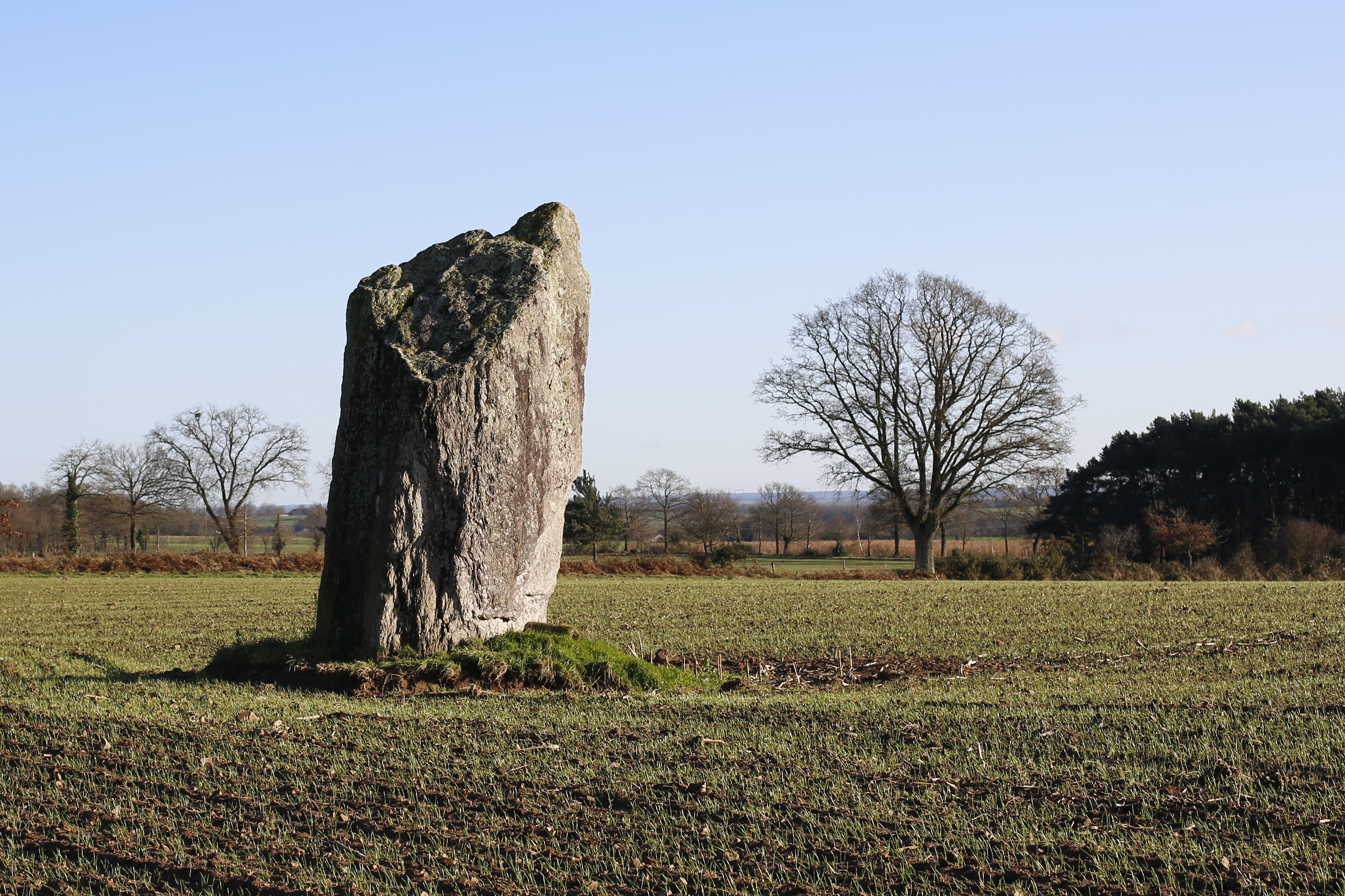
Pierre des Fées Menhir

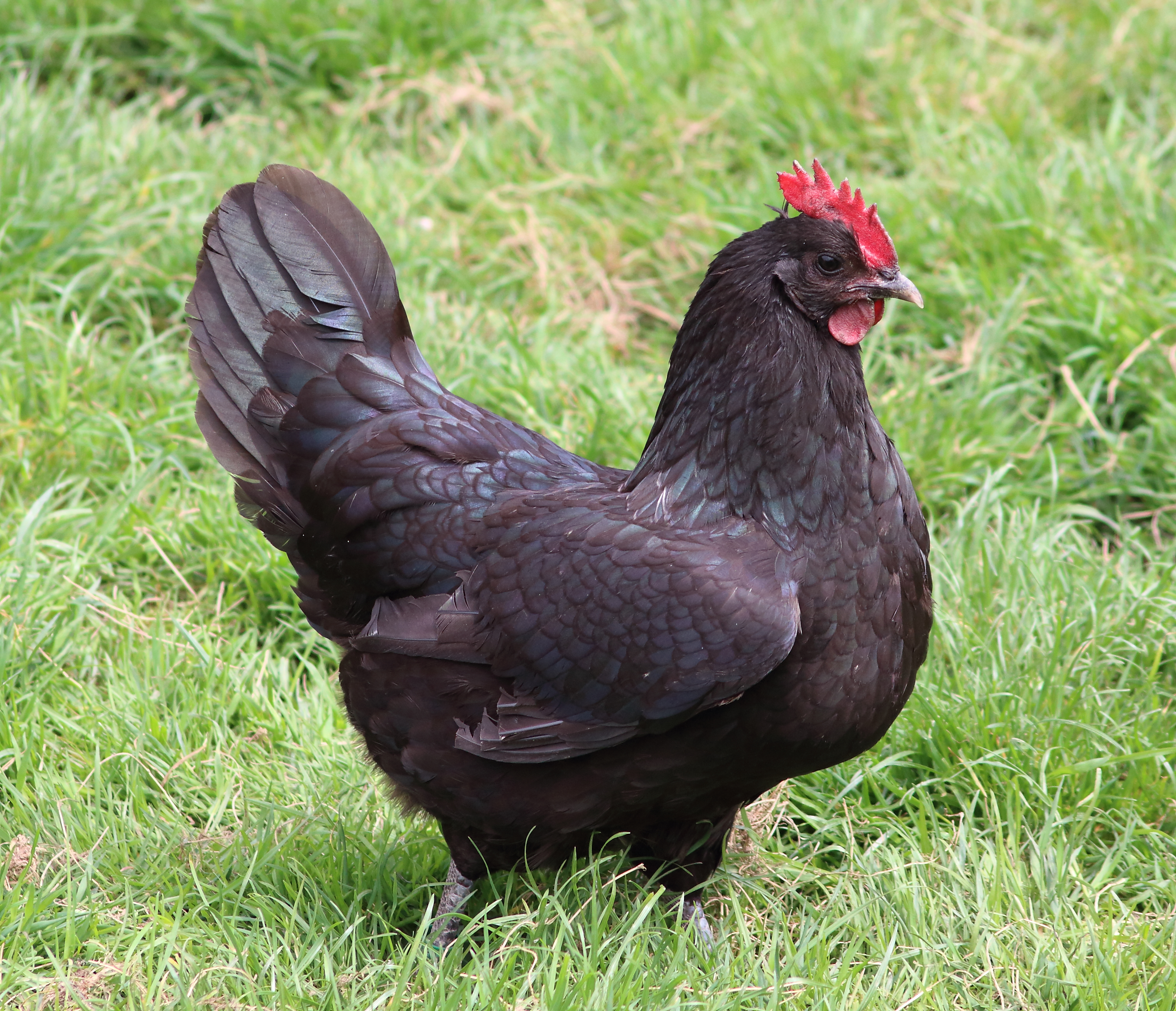
Janzé Black Chicken

== Notable people ==
- Éric Besnard (born 1961), sportscaster
- Pierre-Aristide Bréal (1905–1990), film writer
- Hervé Gauthier (born 1949), footballer and coach
- Jean Jouzel (born 1947), glaciologist and climatologist
- Jérôme Julien Marie Louis de La Morinière (1790–1849). Named Superior General of the Congregation of Jesus and Mary (Eudists) in 1830. Co-founder of the Collège-Lycée Saint-Martin (secondary school) in Rennes.
- Paul Rolland (1951–2015), teacher and cofounder of community radio station Zénith FM.
- Victor Rossignol, priest of the parish of Saint-Martin from 1871 until his death in 1902. He oversaw the construction of the current church and is buried near the altar.

== See also ==
- Communes of the Ille-et-Vilaine department
- Cantons of France
- Communauté de communes
