= Nouvoitou =

Nouvoitou Neveztell (Breton)
- Commune
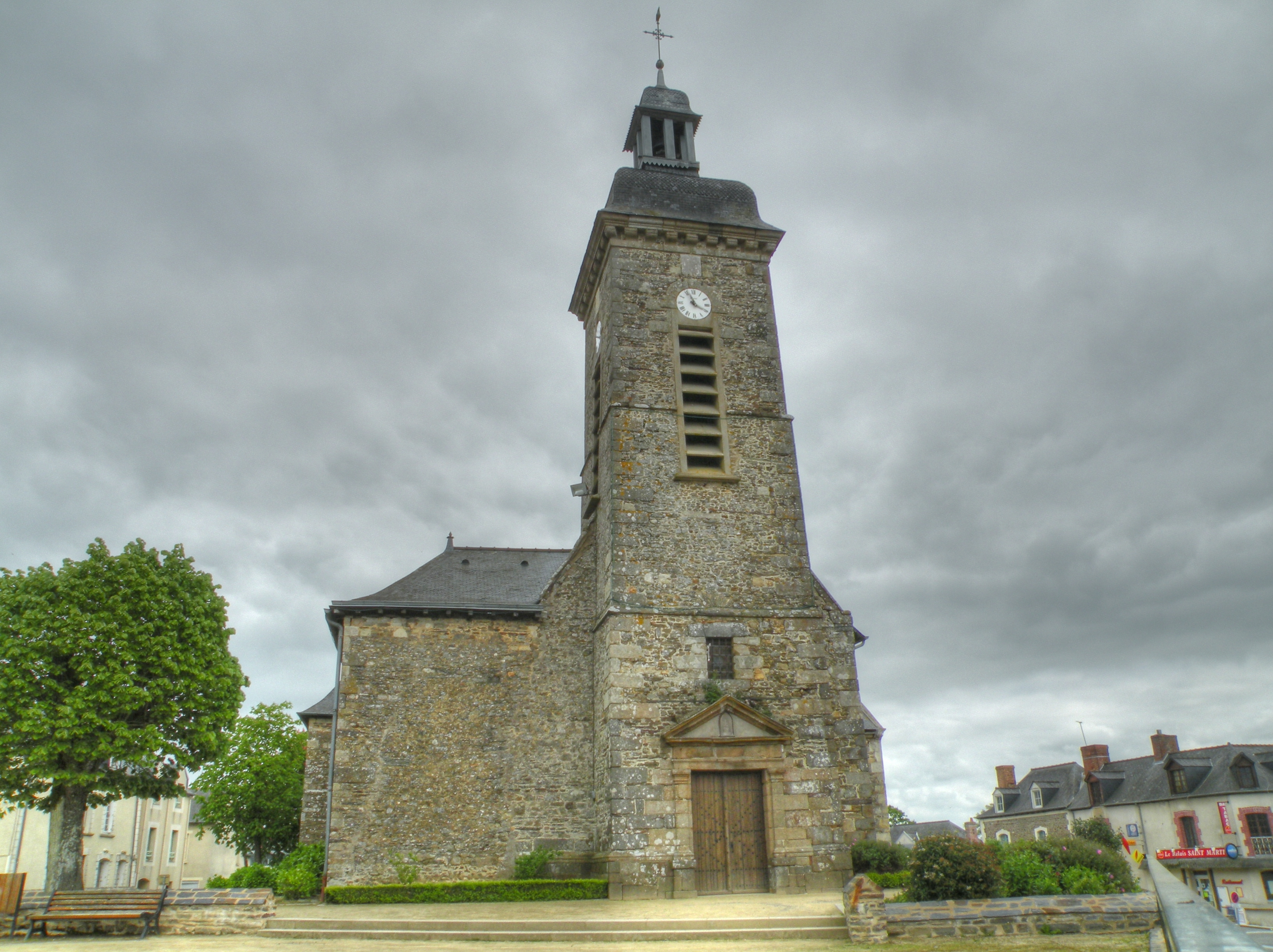
- The church of Saint-Martin-de-Tours, in Nouvoitou
- Location of Nouvoitou
- Location within France Location within Brittany
- Coordinates: 48°02′29″N 1°32′41″W
- Country: France
- Region: Brittany
- Department: Ille-et-Vilaine
- Arrondissement: Rennes
- Canton: Janzé
- Intercommunality: Rennes Métropole

Government
  - Mayor (2020–2026): Jean-Marc Legagneur
- Area^{1}: 18.93 km^{2} (7.31 sq mi)
- Highest elevation: 75 m (246 ft)
- Lowest elevation: 22 m (72 ft)
- Population (2023): 3,911
  - Density: 206.6/km^{2} (535.1/sq mi)
- Time zone: UTC+01:00 (CET)
  - Summer (DST): UTC+02:00 (CEST)
- INSEE/Postal code: 35204 /35410
- ^{1} French Land Register data, which excludes lakes, ponds, glaciers > 1 km^{2} (0.386 sq mi or 247 acres) and river estuaries.

Nouvoitou (French pronunciation: [nuvwatu]; Breton: Neveztell) is a commune in the Ille-et-Vilaine department in Brittany in northwestern France.

== Population ==
Inhabitants of Nouvoitou are called Nouvoitouciens in French.

Historical population
Year	Pop.	±% p.a.
1968	1,125	—
1975	1,157	+0.40%
1982	1,615	+4.88%
1990	2,348	+4.79%
1999	2,556	+0.95%
2007	2,953	+1.82%
2012	2,842	−0.76%
2017	3,099	+1.75%
2023	3,911	+3.95%
Source: INSEE

== See also ==
- Communes of the Ille-et-Vilaine department
