= Saint-Erblon, Ille-et-Vilaine =

Saint-Erblon Sant-Ervlon-an-Dezerzh (Breton)
- Commune
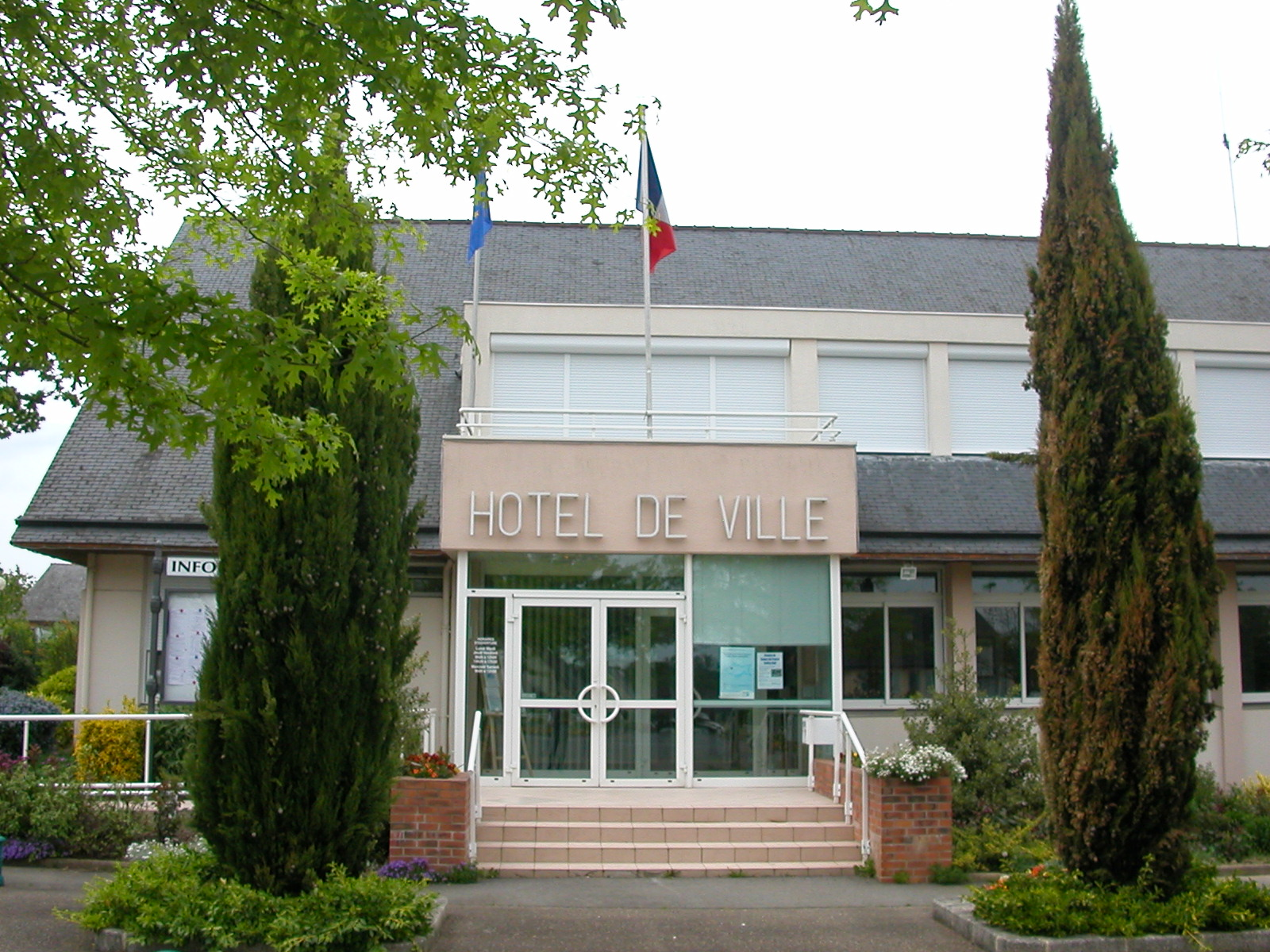
- The town hall of Saint-Erblon
- Location of Saint-Erblon
- Location within France Location within Brittany
- Coordinates: 48°01′11″N 1°39′00″W
- Country: France
- Region: Brittany
- Department: Ille-et-Vilaine
- Arrondissement: Rennes
- Canton: Janzé
- Intercommunality: Rennes Métropole

Government
  - Mayor (2020–2026): Matthieu Pollet
- Area^{1}: 10.93 km^{2} (4.22 sq mi)
- Highest elevation: 49 m (161 ft)
- Lowest elevation: 20 m (66 ft)
- Population (2023): 3,651
  - Density: 334.0/km^{2} (865.1/sq mi)
- Time zone: UTC+01:00 (CET)
  - Summer (DST): UTC+02:00 (CEST)
- INSEE/Postal code: 35266 /35230
- ^{1} French Land Register data, which excludes lakes, ponds, glaciers > 1 km^{2} (0.386 sq mi or 247 acres) and river estuaries.

Saint-Erblon (French pronunciation: [sɛ̃.t‿ɛʁblɔ̃]; Breton: Sant-Ervlon-an-Dezerzh) is a commune in the Ille-et-Vilaine department in Brittany in northwestern France. The commune of Pont-Péan was created in 1986 from part of the commune of Saint-Erblon.

== Population ==
Inhabitants of Saint-Erblon are called saint-erblonnais in French. Population data refer to the commune in its geography as of January 2025.

Historical population
Year	Pop.	±% p.a.
1968	681	—
1975	1,108	+7.20%
1982	1,238	+1.60%
1990	1,708	+4.10%
1999	2,230	+3.01%
2007	2,512	+1.50%
2012	2,553	+0.32%
2017	3,078	+3.81%
2023	3,651	+2.89%
Source: INSEE

== See also ==
- Communes of the Ille-et-Vilaine department
