= Saint-Armel, Ille-et-Vilaine =

Saint-Armel Sant-Armael-ar-Gilli (Breton)
- Commune
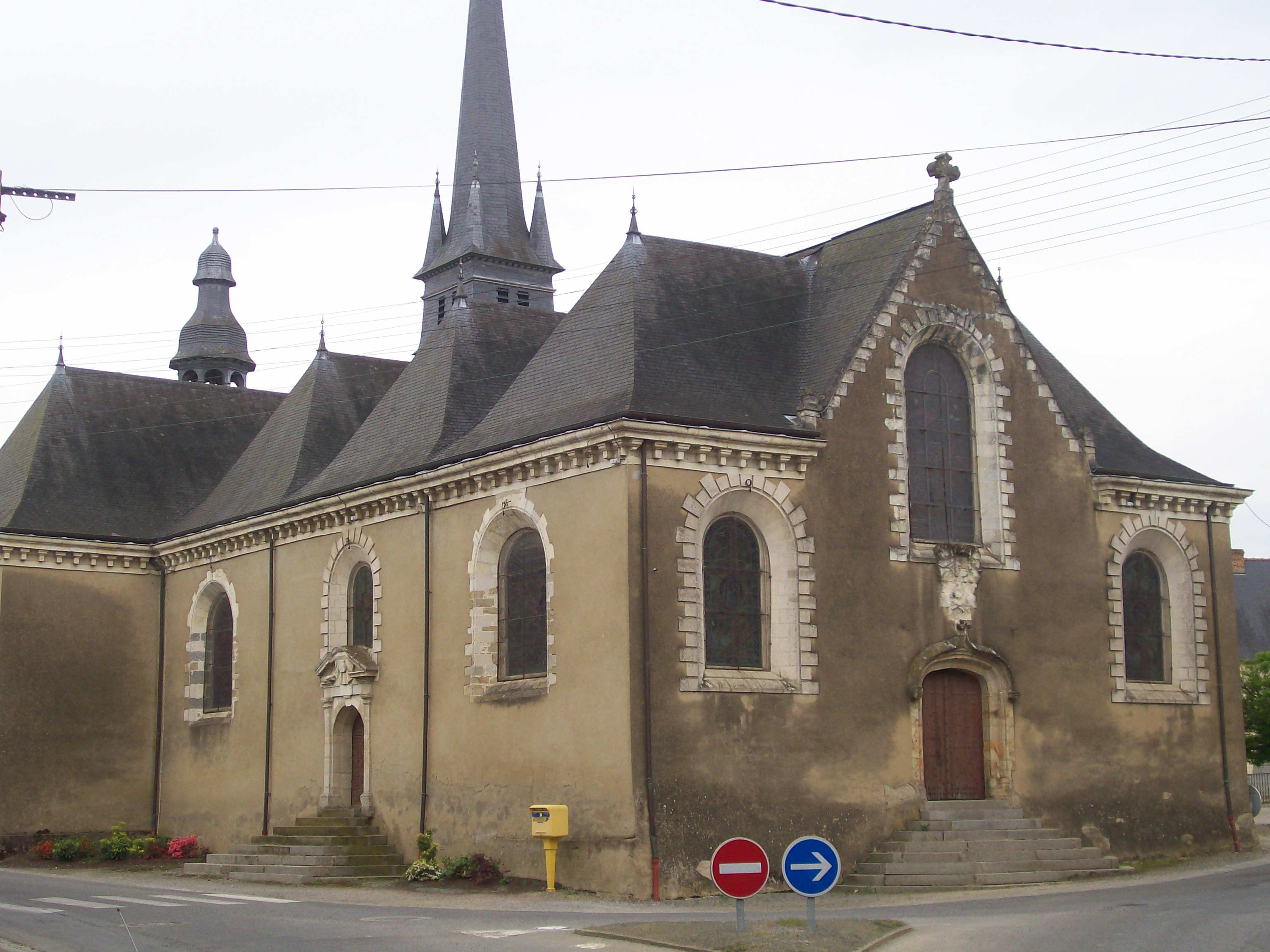
- The west door of the church
- Location of Saint-Armel
- Location within France Location within Brittany
- Coordinates: 48°00′45″N 1°35′21″W
- Country: France
- Region: Brittany
- Department: Ille-et-Vilaine
- Arrondissement: Rennes
- Canton: Janzé
- Intercommunality: Rennes Métropole

Government
  - Mayor (2020–2026): Morgane Madiot
- Area^{1}: 7.75 km^{2} (2.99 sq mi)
- Highest elevation: 79 m (259 ft)
- Lowest elevation: 22 m (72 ft)
- Population (2023): 2,433
  - Density: 314/km^{2} (813/sq mi)
- Time zone: UTC+01:00 (CET)
  - Summer (DST): UTC+02:00 (CEST)
- INSEE/Postal code: 35250 /35230
- ^{1} French Land Register data, which excludes lakes, ponds, glaciers > 1 km^{2} (0.386 sq mi or 247 acres) and river estuaries.

Saint-Armel (French pronunciation: [sɛ̃.t‿aʁmɛl]; Breton: Sant-Armael-ar-Gilli) is a commune in the Ille-et-Vilaine department in Brittany in northwestern France.

== Population ==
Historical population
Year	Pop.	±% p.a.
1968	716	—
1975	809	+1.76%
1982	1,003	+3.12%
1990	1,290	+3.20%
1999	1,393	+0.86%
2007	1,724	+2.70%
2012	1,876	+1.70%
2017	1,981	+1.10%
2023	2,433	+3.48%
Source: INSEE

== See also ==
- Communes of the Ille-et-Vilaine department
