= Canton of Sotteville-lès-Rouen-Est =

Coordinates: 49°23′38″N 1°05′51″E

Sotteville-lès-Rouen-Est
- Former canton
- Interactive map of Sotteville-lès-Rouen-Est
- Country: France
- Region: Normandy
- Department: Seine-Maritime
- No. of communes: {{{nbcomm}}}
- Disbanded: 2015
- Population (2012): 24,556

The Canton of Sotteville-lès-Rouen-Est is a former canton situated in the Seine-Maritime département and in the Haute-Normandie region of northern France. It was disbanded following the French canton reorganisation which came into effect in March 2015. It had a total of 24,556 inhabitants (2012).

== Geography ==
A light industrial area, situated on the left bank of the Seine immediately next to Rouen.

The canton comprised 2 communes:

- Saint-Étienne-du-Rouvray (partly)
- Sotteville-lès-Rouen (partly)

== See also ==
- Arrondissements of the Seine-Maritime department
- Cantons of the Seine-Maritime department
- Communes of the Seine-Maritime department
