= Canton of Châtellerault-Nord =

Coordinates: 46°48′47″N 0°35′05″E

Châtellerault-Nord
- Former canton
- Interactive map of Châtellerault-Nord
- Country: France
- Region: Nouvelle-Aquitaine
- Department: Vienne
- No. of communes: {{{nbcomm}}}
- Disbanded: 2015
- Population (2012): 14,617

The canton of Châtellerault-Nord is a former French canton of the Vienne département in the Poitou-Charentes région of France. It was disbanded following the French canton reorganisation which came into effect in March 2015. It consisted of two communes: the primary town of Châtellerault (partly), and Saint-Sauveur. Its population was 14,617 in 2012.
