= Corps-Nuds =

Corps-Nuds Cornut (Gallo) Kornuz (Breton)
- Commune
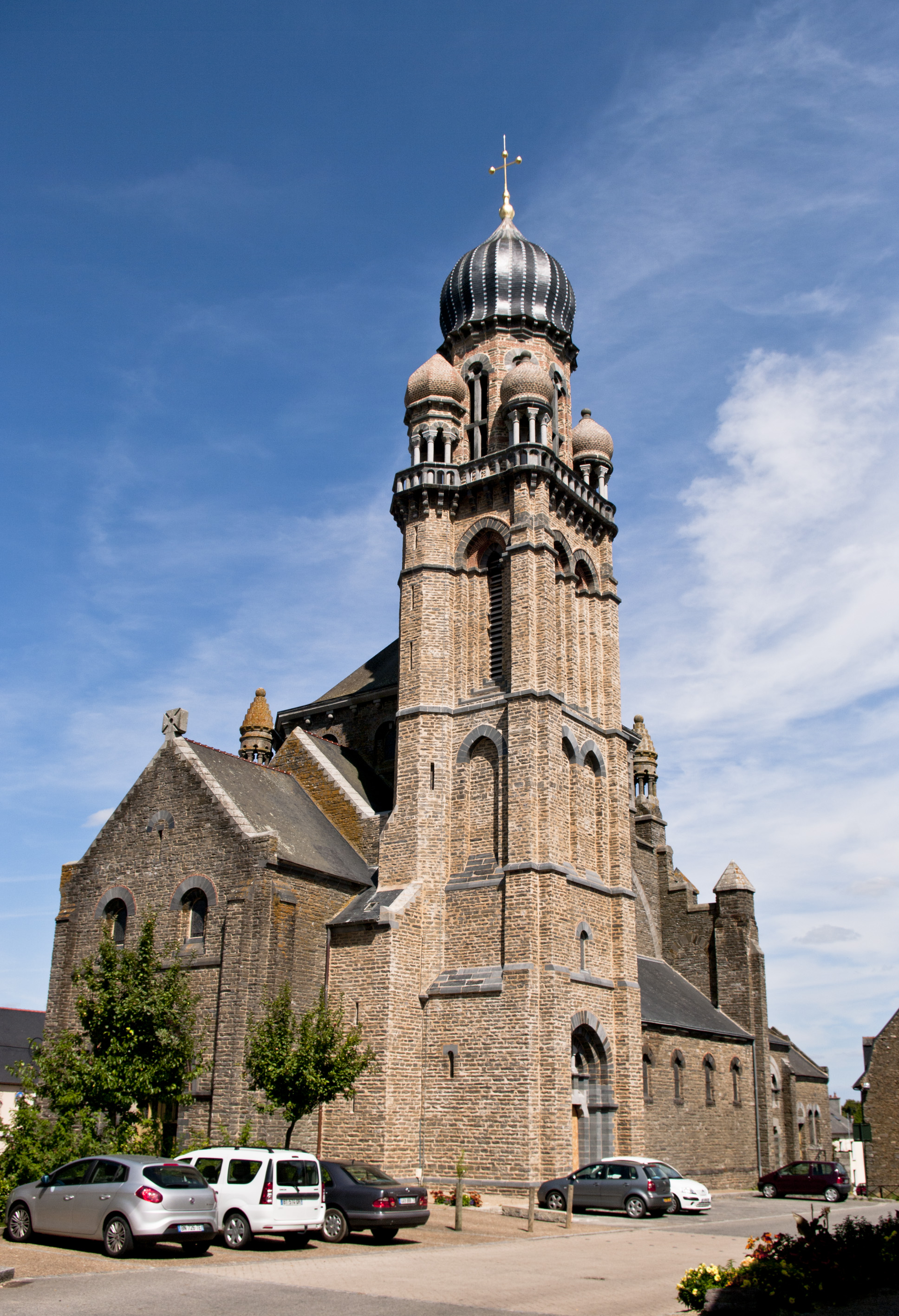
- Saint Pierre church

- Coat of arms
- Location of Corps-Nuds
- Location within France Location within Brittany
- Coordinates: 47°58′44″N 1°35′07″W
- Country: France
- Region: Brittany
- Department: Ille-et-Vilaine
- Arrondissement: Rennes
- Canton: Janzé
- Intercommunality: Rennes Métropole

Government
  - Mayor (2020–2026): Alain Prigent
- Area^{1}: 22.56 km^{2} (8.71 sq mi)
- Highest elevation: 90 m (300 ft)
- Lowest elevation: 34 m (112 ft)
- Population (2023): 3,567
  - Density: 158.1/km^{2} (409.5/sq mi)
- Time zone: UTC+01:00 (CET)
  - Summer (DST): UTC+02:00 (CEST)
- INSEE/Postal code: 35088 /35150
- ^{1} French Land Register data, which excludes lakes, ponds, glaciers > 1 km^{2} (0.386 sq mi or 247 acres) and river estuaries.

Corps-Nuds (French pronunciation: [kɔʁ ny]; Breton: Kornuz; Gallo: Cornut) is a commune in the Ille-et-Vilaine department of Brittany in north-western France.

== Population ==
Inhabitants of Corps-Nuds are called Cornusiens in French.

Historical population
Year	Pop.	±% p.a.
1968	1,409	—
1975	1,515	+1.04%
1982	1,692	+1.59%
1990	2,154	+3.06%
1999	2,458	+1.48%
2007	2,870	+1.96%
2012	3,094	+1.51%
2017	3,296	+1.27%
2023	3,567	+1.33%
Source: INSEE

== See also ==
- Communes of the Ille-et-Vilaine department
