= Canton of Saint-Thégonnec =

Coordinates: 48°29′03″N 3°53′34″W

Saint-Thégonnec
- Former canton
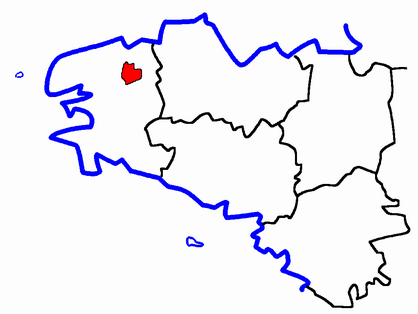
- Location of the canton within Brittany
- Country: France
- Region: Brittany
- Department: Finistère
- No. of communes: {{{nbcomm}}}
- Disbanded: 2015
- Area: 175 km^{2} (68 sq mi)
- Population (2012): 8,001
  - Density: 45.7/km^{2} (118/sq mi)

The Canton of Saint-Thégonnec is a French former canton, located in the arrondissement of Morlaix, in the Finistère département (Brittany région). It had 8,001 inhabitants (2012). It was disbanded following the French canton reorganisation which came into effect in March 2015.

== Composition ==
The canton comprised the following 5 communes:

- Saint-Thégonnec (seat)
- Le Cloître-Saint-Thégonnec
- Loc-Eguiner-Saint-Thégonnec
- Pleyber-Christ
- Plounéour-Ménez

== See also ==
- Cantons of the Finistère department
- Arrondissements of the Finistère department
