= Canton of Châtellerault-Ouest =

Coordinates: 46°48′23″N 0°28′32″E

Châtellerault-Ouest
- Former canton
- Interactive map of Châtellerault-Ouest
- Country: France
- Region: Nouvelle-Aquitaine
- Department: Vienne
- No. of communes: {{{nbcomm}}}
- Disbanded: 2015
- Population (2012): 13,814

The canton of Châtellerault-Ouest is a former French canton of the Vienne département in the Poitou-Charentes région of France. It was disbanded following the French canton reorganisation which came into effect in March 2015. It consisted of three communes: the primary town of Châtellerault (partly), Colombiers, and Thuré. Its population was 13,814 in 2012.
