= Canton of Saint-Chamond-Nord =

Coordinates: 45.4667°N 4.5000°E

Saint-Chamond-Nord
- Former canton
- Interactive map of Saint-Chamond-Nord
- Country: France
- Region: Auvergne-Rhône-Alpes
- Department: Loire
- No. of communes: {{{nbcomm}}}
- Disbanded: 2015
- Population (2012): 17,001

The canton of Saint-Chamond-Nord is a French former administrative division located in the department of Loire and the Rhône-Alpes region. It was disbanded following the French canton reorganisation which came into effect in March 2015. It consisted of part of the commune of Saint-Chamond, which joined the new canton of Saint-Chamond in 2015. It had 17,001 inhabitants (2012).

== See also ==
- Cantons of the Loire department
