= Canton of Oyonnax-Nord =

Coordinates: 46°15′22″N 5°39′20″E

Oyonnax-Nord
- Former canton
- Interactive map of Oyonnax-Nord
- Country: France
- Region: Auvergne-Rhône-Alpes
- Department: Ain
- No. of communes: {{{nbcomm}}}
- Disbanded: 2015
- Population (2012): 17,122

The canton of Oyonnax-Nord is a former administrative division in eastern France. It was disbanded following the French canton reorganisation which came into effect in March 2015. It had 17,122 inhabitants (2012).

The canton comprised 5 communes:

- Arbent
- Belleydoux
- Dortan
- Échallon
- Oyonnax (partly)

== Demographics ==
Historical population
Year	Pop.	±%
1990	17,623	—
1999	18,326	+4.0%
2012	17,122	−6.6%

== See also ==
- Cantons of the Ain department
