= Vern-sur-Seiche =

Vern-sur-Seiche Vèrn (Gallo) Gwern-ar-Sec'h (Breton)
- Commune
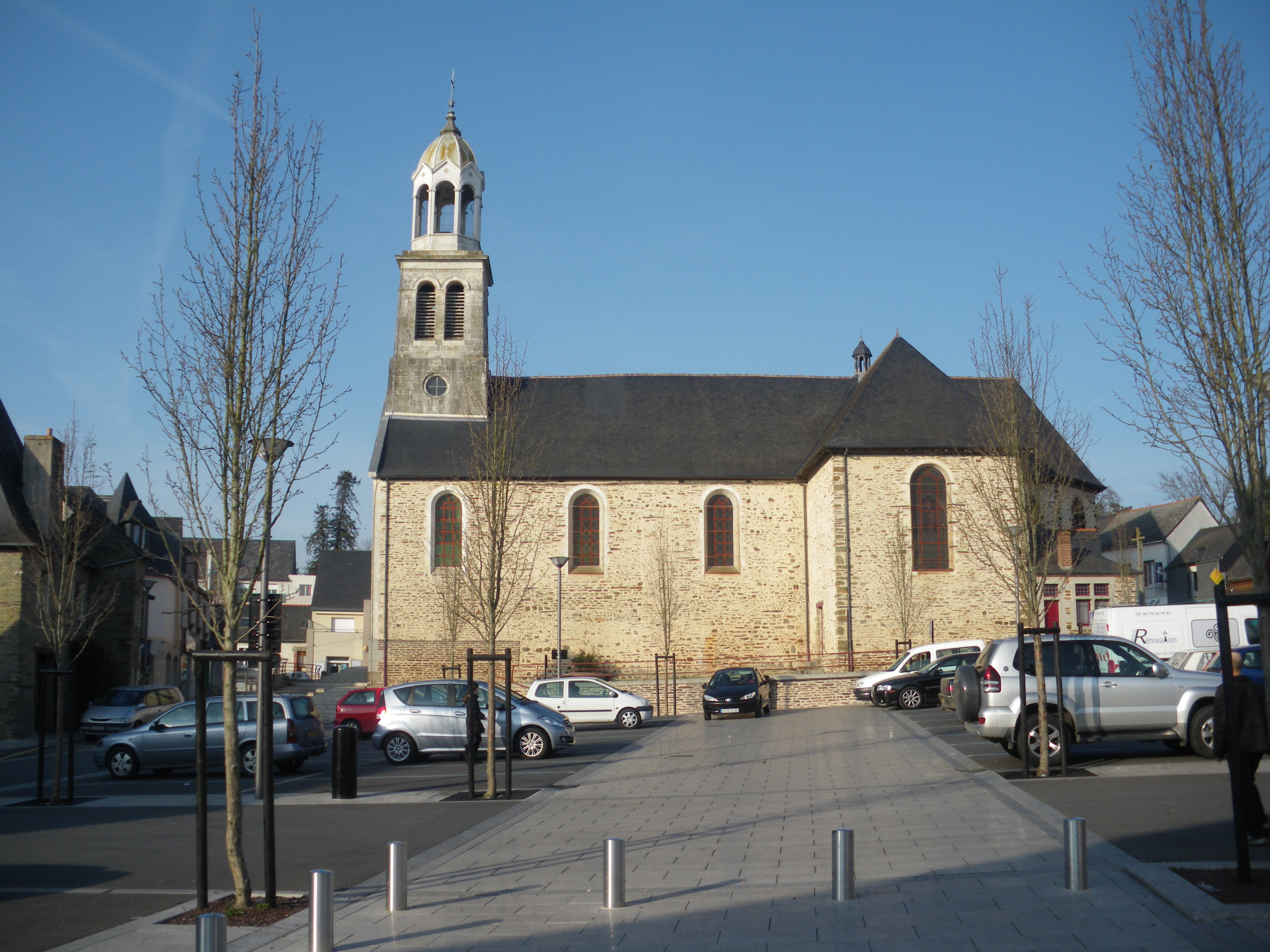
- Market place
- Location of Vern-sur-Seiche
- Location within France Location within Brittany
- Coordinates: 48°02′44″N 1°35′56″W
- Country: France
- Region: Brittany
- Department: Ille-et-Vilaine
- Arrondissement: Rennes
- Canton: Janzé
- Intercommunality: Rennes Métropole

Government
  - Mayor (2020–2026): Stéphane Labbé
- Area^{1}: 19.70 km^{2} (7.61 sq mi)
- Highest elevation: 72 m (236 ft)
- Lowest elevation: 21 m (69 ft)
- Population (2023): 8,207
  - Density: 416.6/km^{2} (1,079/sq mi)
- Time zone: UTC+01:00 (CET)
  - Summer (DST): UTC+02:00 (CEST)
- INSEE/Postal code: 35352 /35770
- ^{1} French Land Register data, which excludes lakes, ponds, glaciers > 1 km^{2} (0.386 sq mi or 247 acres) and river estuaries.

Vern-sur-Seiche (French pronunciation: [vɛʁn syʁ sɛʃ]; Breton: Gwern-ar-Sec'h; Gallo: Vèrn) is a commune in the Ille-et-Vilaine department in Brittany in northwestern France.

== Population ==
Inhabitants of Vern-sur-Seiche are called Vernois and Vernoises in French.

Historical population
Year	Pop.	±% p.a.
1968	1,675	—
1975	2,638	+6.70%
1982	3,116	+2.41%
1990	5,602	+7.61%
1999	7,454	+3.22%
2007	7,877	+0.69%
2012	8,002	+0.32%
2017	7,911	−0.23%
2023	8,207	+0.61%
Source: INSEE

== See also ==
- Communes of the Ille-et-Vilaine department
