= Canton of Janzé =

Coordinates: 47.95°N 1.50°W

Janzé
- Canton
- Country: France
- Region: Brittany
- Department: Ille-et-Vilaine
- No. of communes: {{{nbcomm}}}
- Area: 190.47 km^{2} (73.54 sq mi)
- Population (2023): 43,710
  - Density: 229.5/km^{2} (594.4/sq mi)
- INSEE code: 35 12

The Canton of Janzé is a canton of France, in the Ille-et-Vilaine département, located in the southeast of the department. At the French canton reorganisation which came into effect in March 2015, the canton was expanded from 6 to 10 communes.

It consists of the following communes:

1. Amanlis
2. Bourgbarré
3. Brie
4. Corps-Nuds
5. Janzé
6. Nouvoitou
7. Orgères
8. Saint-Armel
9. Saint-Erblon
10. Vern-sur-Seiche
