= Canton of Saint-Omer-Sud =

Coordinates: 50°43′55″N 2°13′59″E

Saint-Omer-Sud
- Former canton
- Interactive map of Saint-Omer-Sud
- Country: France
- Region: Hauts-de-France
- Department: Pas-de-Calais
- No. of communes: {{{nbcomm}}}
- Disbanded: 2015
- Population (2012): 21,597

The canton of Saint-Omer-Sud is a former canton situated in the department of the Pas-de-Calais and in the Nord-Pas-de-Calais region of northern France. It was disbanded following the French canton reorganisation which came into effect in March 2015. It had a total of 21,597 inhabitants (2012).

== Geography ==
The canton is organised around Saint-Omer in the arrondissement of Saint-Omer. The altitude varies from 0m (Saint-Omer) to 119m (Wizernes) for an average altitude of 38m.

The canton comprised 4 communes:

- Longuenesse
- Saint-Omer (partly)
- Tatinghem
- Wizernes

== See also ==
- Cantons of Pas-de-Calais
- Communes of Pas-de-Calais
- Arrondissements of the Pas-de-Calais department
