= Canton of Moissac-2 =

Canton of France

Coordinates: 44°07′58″N 1°07′04″E

The Canton of Moissac-2 was one of the 12 cantons of the arrondissement of Castelsarrasin, in the Tarn-et-Garonne department, in southern France. It had 7,976 inhabitants (2012). It was disbanded following the French canton reorganisation which came into effect in March 2015. It consisted of 3 communes, which joined the new canton of Moissac in 2015.

The canton comprised the following communes:

- Lizac
- Moissac (partly)
- Montesquieu
