= Canton of Rennes-Sud-Est =

Coordinates: 48°04′59″N 1°37′54″W

Rennes-Sud-Est
- Former canton
- Interactive map of Rennes-Sud-Est
- Country: France
- Region: Brittany
- Department: Ille-et-Vilaine
- No. of communes: {{{nbcomm}}}
- Disbanded: 2015
- Population (2012): 37,247

The Canton of Rennes-Sud-Est is a former canton of France, in the Ille-et-Vilaine département. It had 37,247 inhabitants (2012). It was disbanded following the French canton reorganisation which came into effect in March 2015.

The canton comprised the following communes:

- Rennes (partly)
- Chantepie
- Vern-sur-Seiche
