= Canton of Châtellerault-Sud =

Coordinates: 46°47′12″N 0°32′51″E

Châtellerault-Sud
- Former canton
- Interactive map of Châtellerault-Sud
- Country: France
- Region: Nouvelle-Aquitaine
- Department: Vienne
- No. of communes: {{{nbcomm}}}
- Disbanded: 2015
- Population (2012): 15,161

The canton of South Châtellerault is a former French canton of the Vienne département in the Poitou-Charentes région of France. It was disbanded following the French canton reorganisation which came into effect in March 2015. It consisted of three communes: the primary town of Châtellerault (partly), Naintré, and Senillé. Its population was 15,161 in 2012.
