= Canton of Rennes-Centre-Ouest =

Coordinates: 48.1147°N 1.6794°W

Rennes-Centre-Ouest
- Former canton
- Interactive map of Rennes-Centre-Ouest
- Country: France
- Region: Brittany
- Department: Ille-et-Vilaine
- No. of communes: {{{nbcomm}}}
- Disbanded: 2015
- Population (2012): 23,476

The Canton of Rennes-Centre-Ouest is a former canton of France, in the Ille-et-Vilaine département. It had 23,476 inhabitants (2012). It was disbanded following the French canton reorganisation which came into effect in March 2015. The canton comprised part of the commune of Rennes.
