= Canton of Rennes-Sud-Ouest =

Coordinates: 48°06′00″N 1°43′03″W

Rennes-Sud-Ouest
- Former canton
- Interactive map of Rennes-Sud-Ouest
- Country: France
- Region: Brittany
- Department: Ille-et-Vilaine
- No. of communes: {{{nbcomm}}}
- Disbanded: 2015
- Population (2012): 34,059

The Canton of Rennes-Sud-Ouest is a former canton of France, in the Ille-et-Vilaine département. It had 34,059 inhabitants (2012). It was disbanded following the French canton reorganisation which came into effect in March 2015.

The canton contained the following communes:

- Rennes (partly)
- Saint-Jacques-de-la-Lande
- Vezin-le-Coquet
