= Canton of Rennes-le-Blosne =

Coordinates: 48.1147°N 1.6794°W

Rennes-le-Blosne
- Former canton
- Interactive map of Rennes-le-Blosne
- Country: France
- Region: Brittany
- Department: Ille-et-Vilaine
- No. of communes: {{{nbcomm}}}
- Disbanded: 2015
- Population (2012): 19,672

The Canton of Rennes-le-Blosne is a former canton of France, in the Ille-et-Vilaine département. It had 19,672 inhabitants (2012). It was disbanded following the French canton reorganisation which came into effect in March 2015. The canton comprised part of the commune of Rennes.
