= Canton of Hédé =

Coordinates: 48.3035°N 1.7741°W

Hédé
- Former canton
- Interactive map of Hédé
- Country: France
- Region: Brittany
- Department: Ille-et-Vilaine
- No. of communes: {{{nbcomm}}}
- Disbanded: 2015
- Area: 167 km^{2} (64 sq mi)
- Population (2012): 15,040
  - Density: 90.1/km^{2} (233/sq mi)

The Canton of Hédé is a former canton of France, in the Ille-et-Vilaine département, located in the northeast of the department. It was disbanded following the French canton reorganisation which came into effect in March 2015. It consisted of 10 communes, and its population was 15,040 in 2012.
