= Canton of Mordelles =

Coordinates: 48.1024°N 1.8363°W

Mordelles
- Former canton
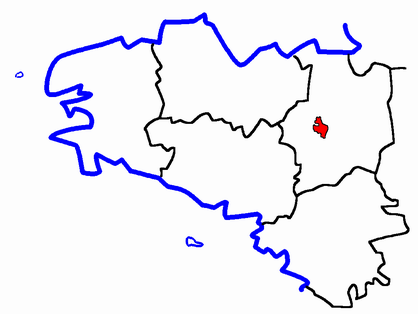
- Country: France
- Region: Brittany
- Department: Ille-et-Vilaine
- No. of communes: {{{nbcomm}}}
- Disbanded: 2015
- Area: 97 km^{2} (37 sq mi)
- Population (2012): 28,711
  - Density: 300/km^{2} (770/sq mi)

The Canton of Mordelles is a former canton of France, in the Ille-et-Vilaine département, located in the centre-west of the department. It was disbanded following the French canton reorganisation which came into effect in March 2015. It consisted of 6 communes, and its population was 28,711 in 2012.
