= Canton of Rennes-Centre-Sud =

Coordinates: 48.1147°N 1.6794°W

Rennes-Centre-Sud
- Former canton
- Interactive map of Rennes-Centre-Sud
- Country: France
- Region: Brittany
- Department: Ille-et-Vilaine
- No. of communes: {{{nbcomm}}}
- Disbanded: 2015
- Population (2012): 15,871

The Canton of Rennes-Centre-Sud is a former canton of France, in the Ille-et-Vilaine département. It had 15,871 inhabitants (2012). It was disbanded following the French canton reorganisation which came into effect in March 2015. The canton comprised part of the commune of Rennes.
