= Canton of Rennes-Nord-Ouest =

Coordinates: 48°10′06″N 1°46′03″W

Rennes-Nord-Ouest
- Former canton
- Interactive map of Rennes-Nord-Ouest
- Country: France
- Region: Brittany
- Department: Ille-et-Vilaine
- No. of communes: {{{nbcomm}}}
- Disbanded: 2015
- Population (2012): 33,126

The Canton of Rennes-Nord-Ouest is a former canton of France, in the Ille-et-Vilaine département. It had 33,126 inhabitants (2012). It was disbanded following the French canton reorganisation which came into effect in March 2015.

The canton comprised the following communes:

- Rennes (partly);
- Gévezé;
- Pacé; and
- Parthenay-de-Bretagne.
