= Canton of Cesson-Sévigné =

Coordinates: 48.1275°N 1.5702°W

Cesson-Sévigné
- Former canton
- Interactive map of Cesson-Sévigné
- Country: France
- Region: Brittany
- Department: Ille-et-Vilaine
- No. of communes: {{{nbcomm}}}
- Disbanded: 2015
- Area: 62 km^{2} (24 sq mi)
- Population (2012): 22,481
  - Density: 360/km^{2} (940/sq mi)

The Canton of Cesson-Sévigné is a former canton of France, in the Ille-et-Vilaine département. It was disbanded following the French canton reorganisation which came into effect in March 2015. It consisted of 2 communes, and its population was 22,481 in 2012.
