= Canton of Plélan-le-Grand =

Coordinates: 48.0307°N 2.016°W

Plélan-le-Grand
- Former canton
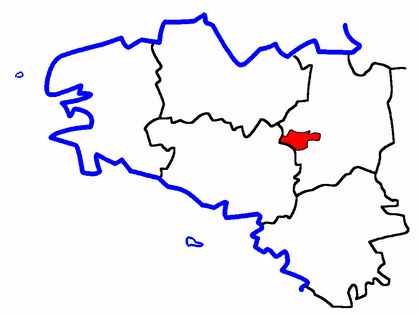
- Country: France
- Region: Brittany
- Department: Ille-et-Vilaine
- No. of communes: {{{nbcomm}}}
- Disbanded: 2015
- Area: 297 km^{2} (115 sq mi)
- Population (2012): 16,805
  - Density: 56.6/km^{2} (147/sq mi)

The Canton of Plélan-le-Grand is a former canton of France, in the Ille-et-Vilaine département, located in the west of the department. It was disbanded following the French canton reorganisation which came into effect in March 2015. It consisted of 8 communes, and its population was 16,805 in 2012.
