= Canton of Saint-Aubin-d'Aubigné =

Coordinates: 48.2809°N 1.617°W

Saint-Aubin-d'Aubigné
- Former canton
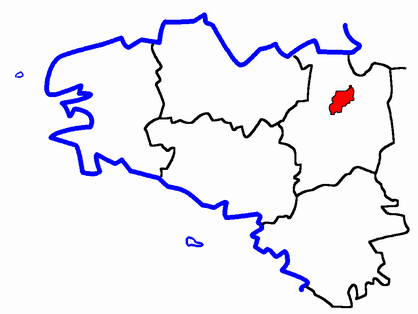
- Country: France
- Region: Brittany
- Department: Ille-et-Vilaine
- No. of communes: {{{nbcomm}}}
- Disbanded: 2015
- Area: 241 km^{2} (93 sq mi)
- Population (2012): 25,903
  - Density: 107/km^{2} (278/sq mi)

The Canton of Saint-Aubin-d'Aubigné is a former canton of France, in the Ille-et-Vilaine département, located in the centre of the department. It was disbanded following the French canton reorganisation which came into effect in March 2015. It consisted of 15 communes, and its population was 25,903 in 2012.
