= Canton of Rennes-Brequigny =

Coordinates: 48°05′24″N 1°41′56″W

Rennes-Brequigny
- Former canton
- Interactive map of Rennes-Brequigny
- Country: France
- Region: Brittany
- Department: Ille-et-Vilaine
- No. of communes: {{{nbcomm}}}
- Disbanded: 2015
- Population (2012): 13,259

The Canton of Rennes-Brequigny is a former canton of France, in the Ille-et-Vilaine département. It had 13,259 inhabitants (2012). It was disbanded following the French canton reorganisation which came into effect in March 2015. The canton comprised part of the commune of Rennes.
