= Canton of Rennes-Est =

Rennes-Est
- Former canton
- Country: France
- Region: Brittany
- Department: Ille-et-Vilaine
- No. of communes: {{{nbcomm}}}
- Disbanded: 2015
- Population (2012): 21,964

The Canton of Rennes-Est is a former canton of France, in the Ille-et-Vilaine département. It had 21,964 inhabitants in 2012. It was disbanded following the French canton reorganisation which came into effect in March 2015. The canton comprised part of the commune of Rennes.
