= Canton of Bécherel =

Coordinates: 48.2721°N 1.9010°W

Bécherel
- Former canton
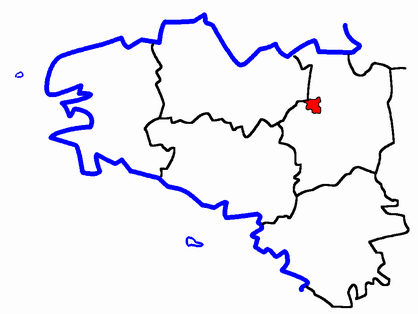
- Country: France
- Region: Brittany
- Department: Ille-et-Vilaine
- No. of communes: {{{nbcomm}}}
- Disbanded: 2015
- Area: 121 km^{2} (47 sq mi)
- Population (2012): 11,592
  - Density: 95.8/km^{2} (248/sq mi)

The Canton of Bécherel is a former canton of France, in the Ille-et-Vilaine département, located in the northwest of the department. It was disbanded following the French canton reorganisation which came into effect in March 2015. It consisted of 10 communes, and its population was 11,592 in 2012.
