= Talensac =

Talensac Talanczac (Gallo) Talenseg (Breton)
- Commune
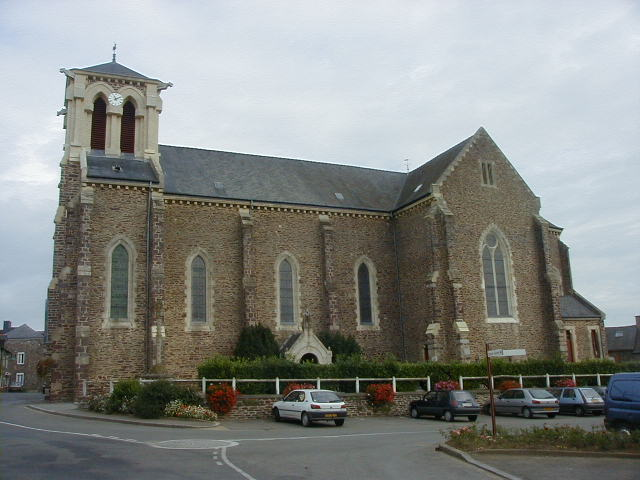
- The church in Talensac

- Coat of arms
- Location of Talensac
- Location within France Location within Brittany
- Coordinates: 48°06′35″N 1°55′30″W
- Country: France
- Region: Brittany
- Department: Ille-et-Vilaine
- Arrondissement: Rennes
- Canton: Montfort-sur-Meu
- Intercommunality: Montfort Communauté

Government
  - Mayor (2021–2026): Bruno Duteil
- Area^{1}: 21.61 km^{2} (8.34 sq mi)
- Highest elevation: 128 m (420 ft)
- Lowest elevation: 24 m (79 ft)
- Population (2023): 2,571
  - Density: 119.0/km^{2} (308.1/sq mi)
- Time zone: UTC+01:00 (CET)
  - Summer (DST): UTC+02:00 (CEST)
- INSEE/Postal code: 35331 /35160
- ^{1} French Land Register data, which excludes lakes, ponds, glaciers > 1 km^{2} (0.386 sq mi or 247 acres) and river estuaries.

Talensac (French pronunciation: [talɑ̃sak]; Breton: Talenseg; Gallo: Talanczac) is a French commune in the department of Ille-et-Vilaine, Brittany, northwestern France.

== Geography ==
The river Meu forms all of the commune's eastern border. Located at 20 km in the West of Rennes in the perimeter of the second suburb of Rennes, Talensac is crossed from the West to the East by the brooks of Guillermoux and of Bignons which form the Barillais, the Serein and the Rohuel and then the Chèze which are confluents of the Meu river. It is next to the forest of Montfort-sur-Meu. The town stretches on 2.161 hectares including 174 hectares of forest with a population of 2.100 inhabitants. It is surrounded by Montfort-sur-Meu, Bédée, La Nouaye, Breteil, Pleumeleuc, Iffendic, Saint-Gonlay.

Talensac has hamlets:

- Crabassou
- Trénube

== Population ==
Inhabitants of Talensac are called Talensacois in French.

Historical population
Year	Pop.	±% p.a.
1968	901	—
1975	1,083	+2.66%
1982	1,977	+8.98%
1990	2,057	+0.50%
1999	2,044	−0.07%
2007	2,333	+1.67%
2012	2,376	+0.37%
2017	2,488	+0.93%
2023	2,571	+0.55%
Source: INSEE

== History ==
As soon as 1803, Talensac was an independent parish which also included the village of Le Verger. The first church was replaced and rebuilt around 1703. But this church, dedicated to Saint-Anne, was devastated by a fire in June 1872. Another church was then built (actual church). It has been consecrated in 1882 by the archbishop of that time.
Judicaël and Erispoë, dukes of Brittany, had a residence from the 7th and 9th century in Talensac. Erispoë lived in the village of the "Châtellier" next to the road of Breteil. This fortification was protected as it had moats. The 2 November 857, Erispoë is assassinated in the church of Talensac by Salomon, his first cousin, who didn't want Erispoë's daughter to marry the son of Charles le Chauve. This would have brought into play the lands of Salomon and the independence of Brittany faced to West Francia, but also all the chances of Salomon to access to the throne.
In 1152, Guillaume I's spouse gave Saint-Jacques de Montfort abbey, the taxes of Talensac and the mill of the town to monks. The son of Guillaume I and of Amice de Porhoët, Godefroy de Montfort, left the "le pré au Comte" in 1171.
Around 1372, the castle of the "Châtellier", property of the Bintin family, is devastated.
In 1697, Jeanne-Françoise De Massuel, Lady of the Bois-de-Bintin, married the Lord of Belin, Mathurin Lesné, in Talensac. Him and his spouse lived in the castle of "Bédoyère", an imposing residence from the 17th century.
The castle, badly preserved during the different periods it went through, was demolished around 1920.

=== The grès Saint-Méen ===
In the forest of Montfort-sur-Meu, at the place called "Le Bois de Saint-Lazare", we can see at the edge of an old oak, the menhir of the Grés Saint-Méen. This menhir is classified Historical Monument. According to the legend, Saint-Méen had built the town of Talensac. There are two stories about this legend.
The first version says that Saint-Méen was travelling with his followers and he saw a hill full of vegetation near the banks of the Meu river. He liked the landscape and so he decided to stay a few days at this place. After crossing a ford, he said to a monk, at the same time he thrown his battle axe he had in his hand: "Where this battle axe will fall is where Méen will build". And the axe felt at the exact place where the church of Talensac is today. Saint-Méen kept his word and cleared with help from his companions, a space big enough to build a chapel and a few shelters for him and his apostles. Then he spread the good word to the pagans in the surroundings. Many people listened to his voice and settled around the chapel. According to this first version, this is how appeared the town of Talensac.
The second version says that the Grès Saint-Méen was a kind of menhir upside down that had traces of acorn cups on the top. During the 6th century, after sharpening his battle axe on this stone, Saint-Méen said "Where this battle axe will fall is where Méen will build". Then he built the church of Talensac, 1.200m further long, where the battle axe felt. According to the same version, the stone was used as an altar for the immolation of human victims. Saint-Méen might have been attacked by one of his former followers. He managed to avoid the knocks of his disloyal apostle. But this last, while trying to kill Saint-Méen, hit the stone which felt right on him. We say that his body is still underneath.

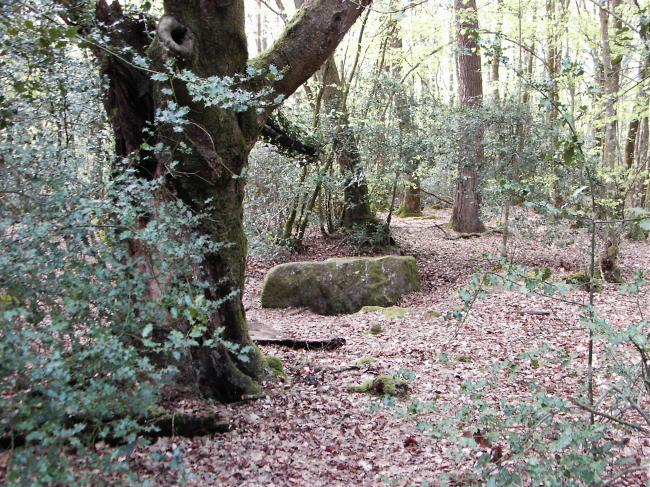
Menhir of Saint-Méen (credit: Philippe Saint-Marc)

== Tourism ==
Tourism management in Montfort-sur-Meu" is entrusted by Montfort Community to the Tourist Office of the district of Montfort.

== Buildings and touristic places ==
=== Buildings ===
- Saint Méen church

It is dated from the 19th century but the cross next to it is from the 16th century.

- La Hunaudière Manor

The manor is dated from the end of the 16th century. It successively belonged to the family Haloret, De l'Estourbeillon and then Le Guern. In the 20th century, it accommodated nones and housed the girls' school of Talensac.

- Saint-Lunaire fountain

The fountain, located near the town centre, has, according to the local tradition, the power to cure eyes.

=== Touristic places ===
- Eminescu park

The Eminescu park offers an exceptional view on the valley of the Meu river. Starting point of pedestrian paths, this park has picnic areas and playgrounds.

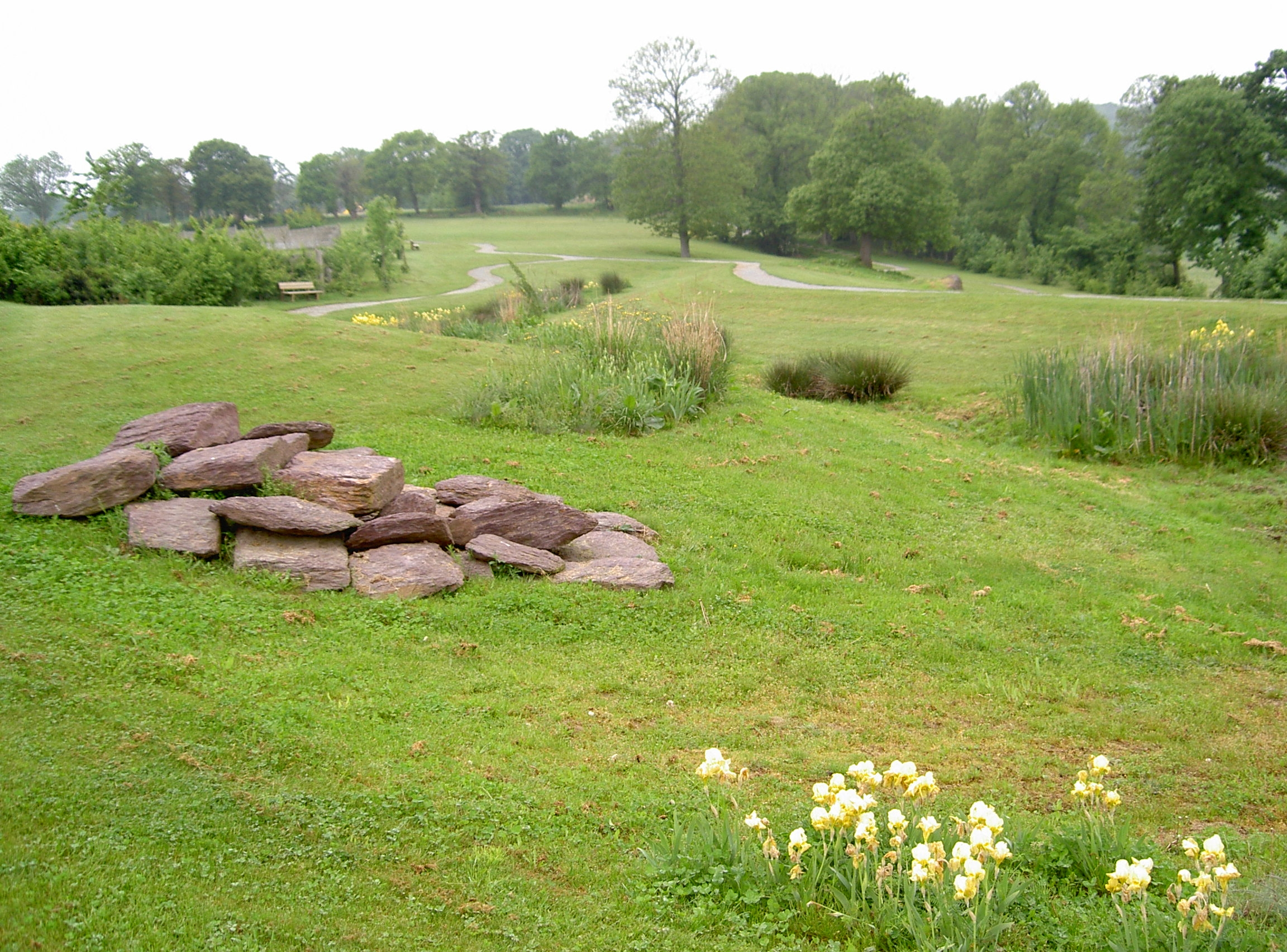
Eminescu park

- The Grès Saint Méen

See above in the section "History" / "Grès Saint Méen".

- Circuit of the pond of Guern

The starting point of this circuit is at the esplanade "Eminescu". It lasts about an hour, is 5 km long and is marked with green arrows.
The circuit has a few very steep hills.

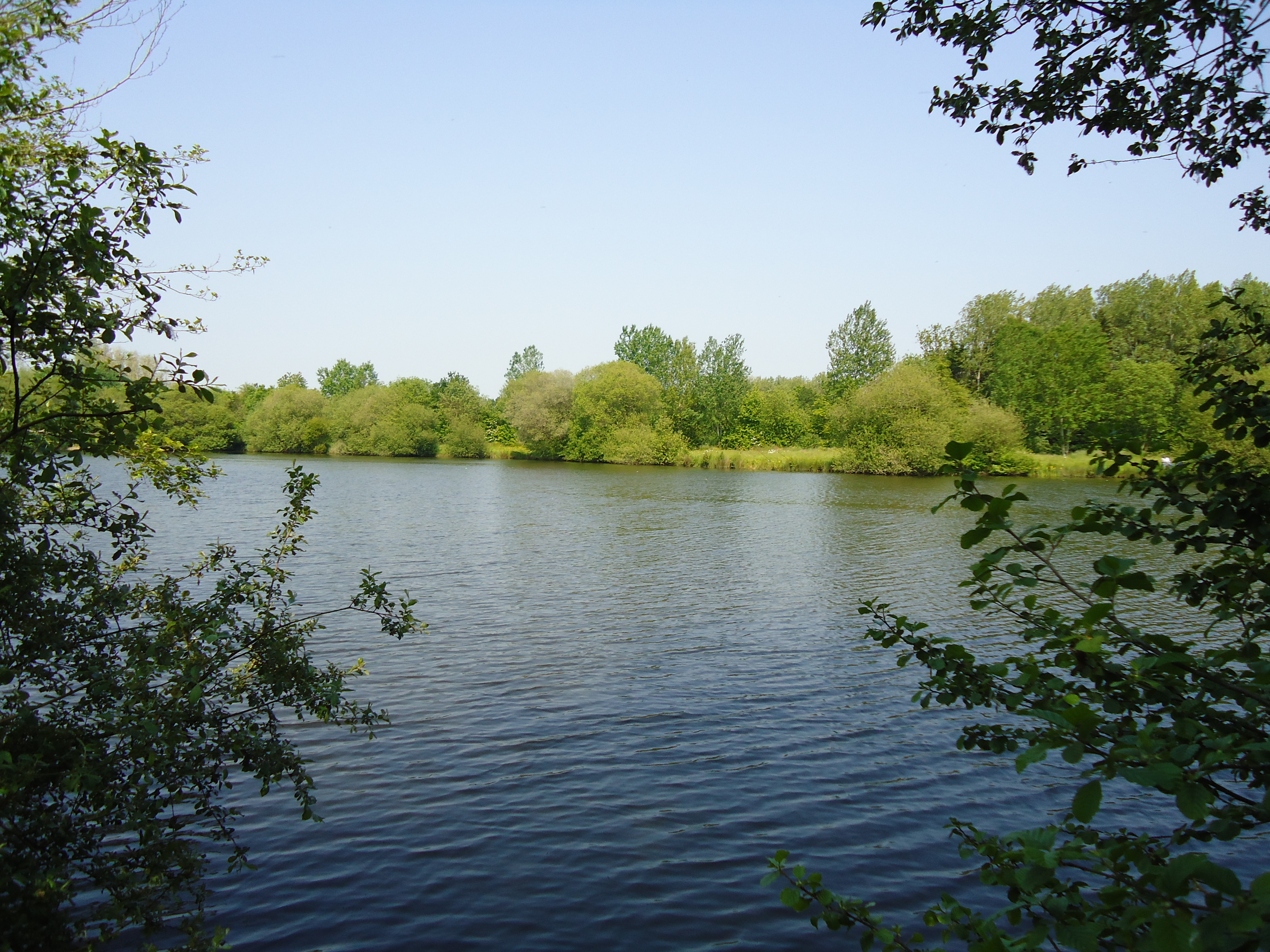
Pond of Le guern

- Circuit of Trieneuc, Val-Beuzet, Les Auriais.

The starting point of this circuit is at the esplanade "Eminescu". Following the red arrows, the circuit lasts 2h45 and is 11.5 km long. It offers a panorama on Montfort-sur-Meu, Bédée and Breteil. Some brooks and waterfalls liven up the circuit.

- Circuit of La Vallée, Trieneuc, Les Auriais

The starting point is at the esplanade "Eminescu" in Talensac. The circuit is 14 km long and takes about 3 hours and 15 minutes to compete. It is marked with blue and red arrows. The landscape is undulating with a lot of moorland. It offers a panorama on the villages of Monterfil, Le Verger and Treffendel; the city of Rennes is also paritally visible.

- Circuit of the pond of Carrouët

The starting point is at the esplanade "Eminescu". It is 4.5 km long and lasts 1h10. It hasn't got any major difficulties.

- Former castle of La Bédoyère

== See also ==
- Communes of the Ille-et-Vilaine department
