= Saint-Gonlay =

Saint-Gonlay Saent-Gólei (Gallo) Sant-Gonlei (Breton)
- Commune
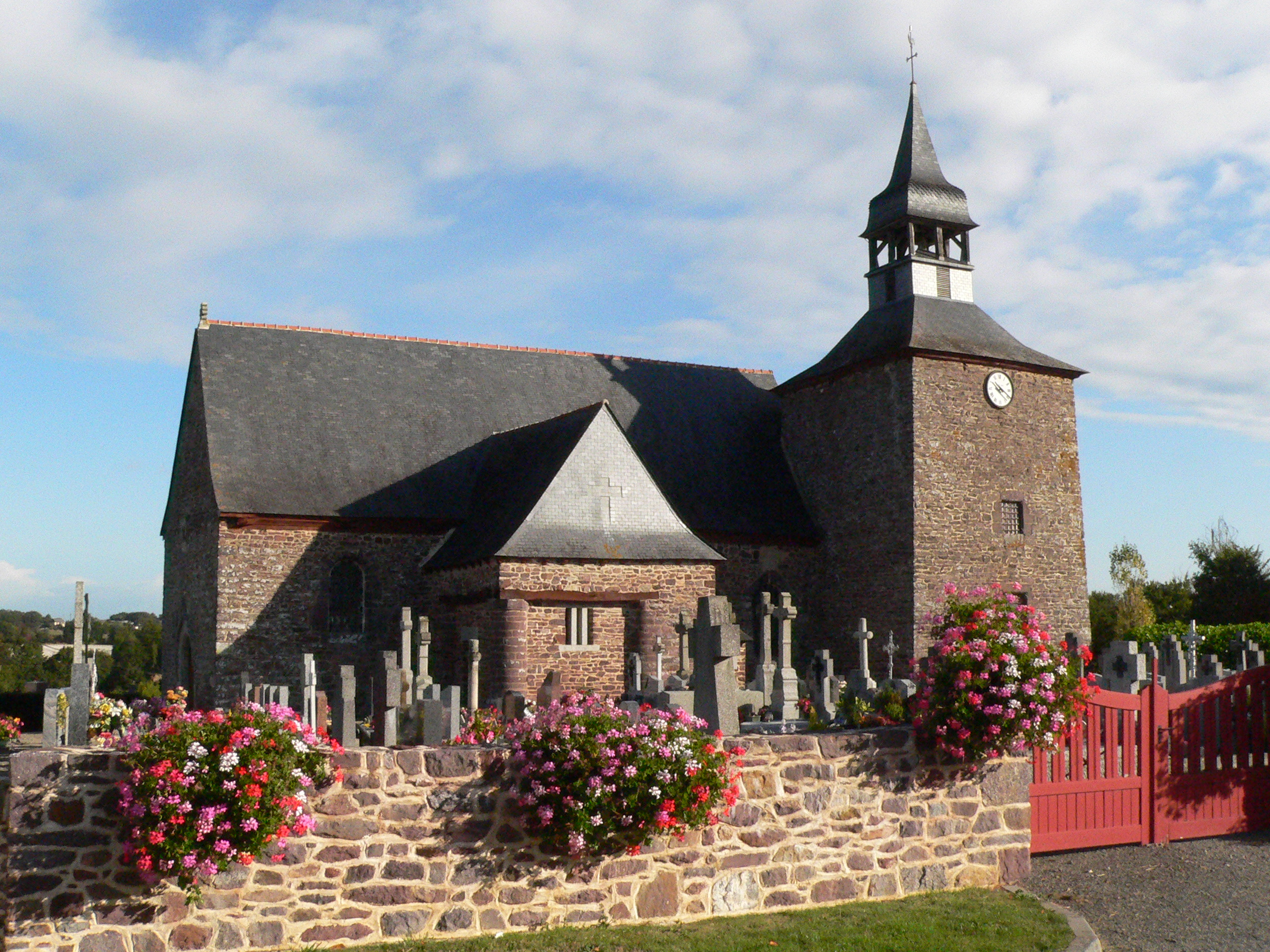
- The church of Saint-Gonlay
- Location of Saint-Gonlay
- Location within France Location within Brittany
- Coordinates: 48°06′50″N 2°03′53″W
- Country: France
- Region: Brittany
- Department: Ille-et-Vilaine
- Arrondissement: Rennes
- Canton: Montfort-sur-Meu
- Intercommunality: Montfort Communauté

Government
  - Mayor (2020–2026): Loïc Boisgerault
- Area^{1}: 9.26 km^{2} (3.58 sq mi)
- Highest elevation: 95 m (312 ft)
- Lowest elevation: 38 m (125 ft)
- Population (2023): 377
  - Density: 40.7/km^{2} (105/sq mi)
- Time zone: UTC+01:00 (CET)
  - Summer (DST): UTC+02:00 (CEST)
- INSEE/Postal code: 35277 /35750
- ^{1} French Land Register data, which excludes lakes, ponds, glaciers > 1 km^{2} (0.386 sq mi or 247 acres) and river estuaries.

Saint-Gonlay (French pronunciation: [sɛ̃ ɡɔ̃lɛ]; Gallo: Saent-Gólei, Breton: Sant-Gonlei) is a commune in the department of Ille-et-Vilaine in Brittany in the northwest of France.

== Geography ==
The Meu river goes through the town. There are 280 inhabitants in Saint-Gonlay and the territory stretches over 926 hectares.
In the North, there is the Meu river and the Comper river, in the East is the brook of Boutavent and in the South, the forest of Brocéliande.
The town is part of the county of Montfort-sur-Meu and depends on Rennes. It is surrounded by Montfort-sur-Meu, Bédée, La Nouaye, Breteil, Pleumeleuc, Talensac, Iffendic.

Rivers: The Comper The Meu Brooks: The Hélouin The Boutavent The Planchette Mountaintop: The Châtel (91 meters) The Lorinou (83 meters)

== Population ==
Inhabitants of Saint-Gonlay are called gonlaysiens in French.

Historical population
Year	Pop.	±% p.a.
1968	329	—
1975	304	−1.12%
1982	296	−0.38%
1990	280	−0.69%
1999	274	−0.24%
2007	333	+2.47%
2012	348	+0.89%
2017	354	+0.34%
2023	377	+1.05%
Source: INSEE

== History ==
The parish of Iffendic separated in two and the town of Saint-Gonlay was founded. Its birth is probably due to the building of a church in the 13th century by two priests of Montfort-sur-Meu. A priory has also been built and it depends on Saint-Jacques de Montfort abbey.

== Tourism ==
Tourism management is entrusted by Montfort Communauté to the Tourist Office of the district of Montfort.

== Buildings and touristic places ==
- The schoolhouse of Saint-Gonlay

The schoolhouse is the former public house of Saint-Gonlay. In the past, it was a dynamic school of the district of Montfort. Nowadays, the school has been transformed into a small museum and shows a class from the 1950s. It also shows photos and presents souvenirs of the former schoolchildren, outdoor games, etc.

- Saint-Guillaume church

Surrounded by its cemetery, it is dated from the 16th and 17th century.
It was apparently dedicated to Saint-Gundlée, king of Glamorgan. We can notice of the front wall two characters facing each other: a confessor and a somebody confessing.

- Noble house of Le Vilou

The house of Le Vilou is dated from the 18th century. It was considered at the time as a notable house. Indeed, back then, a subprefect of Montfort-sur-Meu lived there.

- Public house from the 1950s-1960s, it has been one of the most predominant in the region. Nowadays, the church is converted into a small museum where visitors can find a setting of the 1960s.
- The castle of La Châsse

The castle of La Châsse is dated from the 17th century.
It was destroyed in 1595 during the French War of Religion, then rebuilt.

- The manor of the Changée
- Bridge Hervil on the Comper river
- Bridge Jean on the Meu river
- La Rousselais on the Meu river
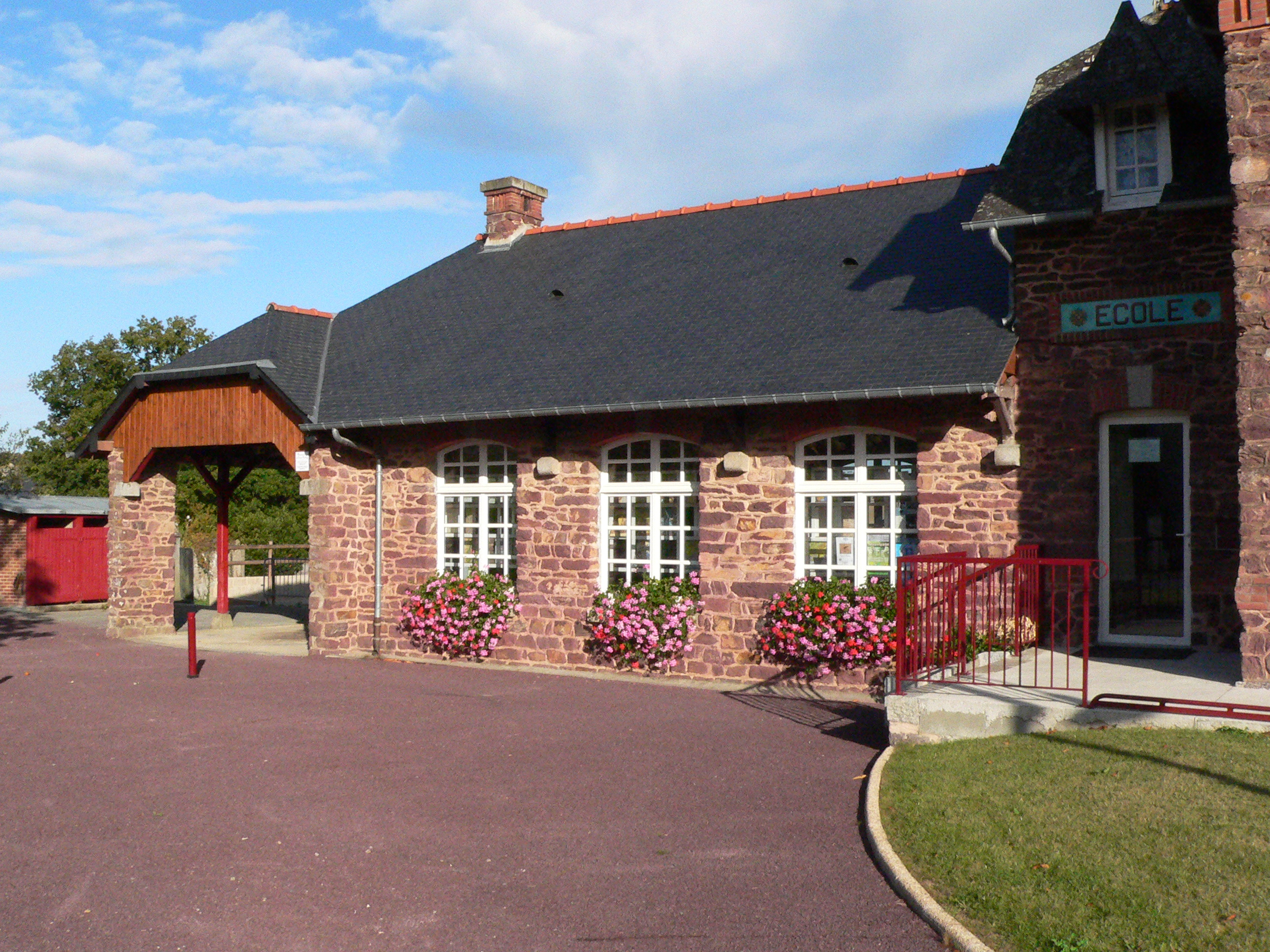
Schoolhouse in Saint-Gonlay

== Sights ==
The path of schoolchildren The starting point is on the car park near the church and the town hall. The marking of the circuit is blue. It is 9 km long and goes up and down through the town of Saint-Gonlay and its villages, in the countryside. The hike lasts 2h15, follows the Meu river and offers many panoramas at different places on the circuit. We can then see the town centre of Iffendic, the forest of Broceliande, etc.

== See also ==
- Communes of the Ille-et-Vilaine department
