= Boutavent Castle =

Coordinates: 48°04′29″N 2°03′04″W

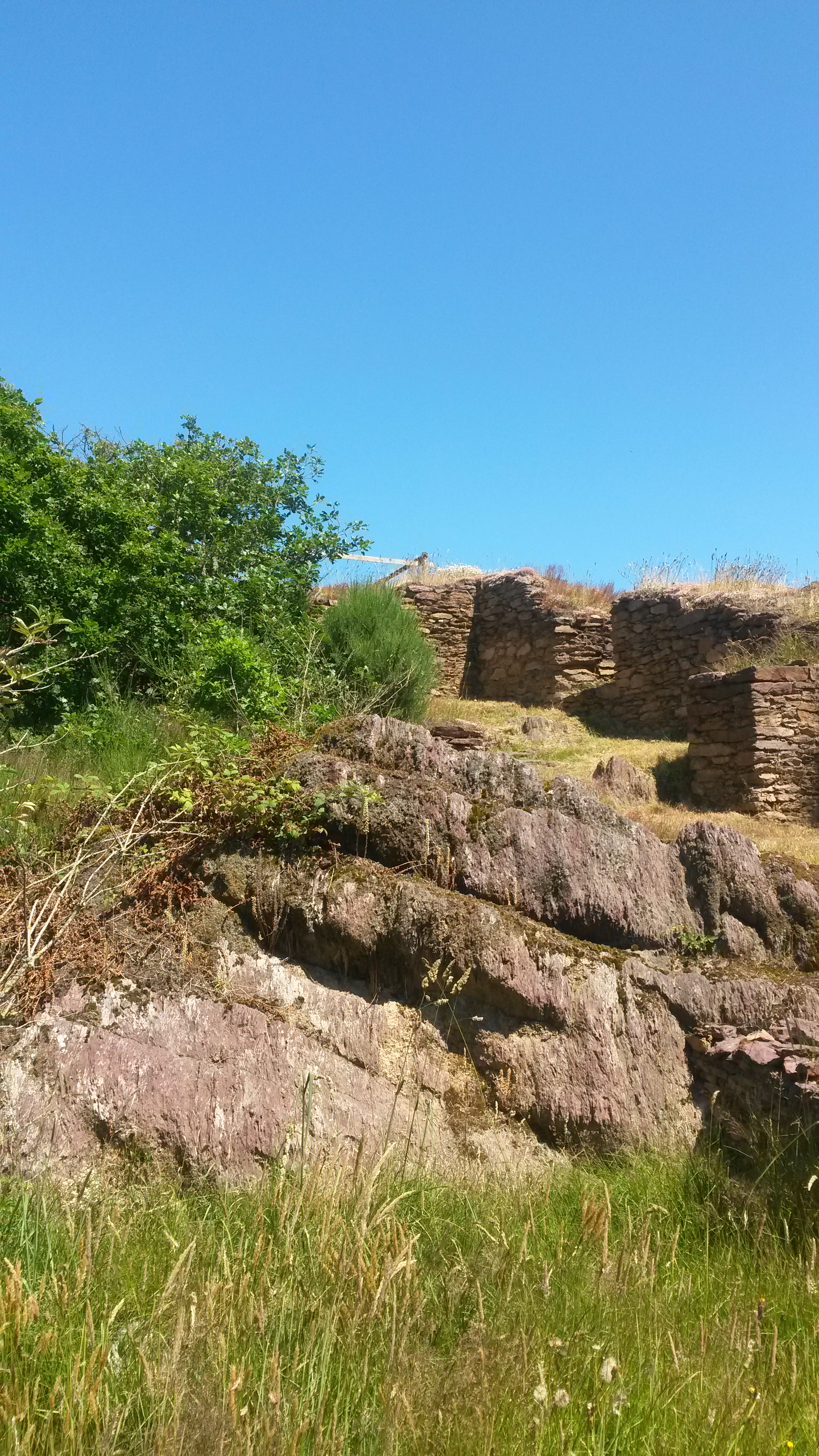
Wall of the Castle of Boutavent

Boutavent Castle (French: Château de Boutavent) is in Iffendic, department of Ille-et-Vilaine, Brittany, France. The ruins of the castle, built in the Middle Ages, are on a natural rocky spur at the place name Boutavent. The land, surrounded by the forest of Paimpont and the pond of Boutavent, stretches over more than 2 hectares.

It has been confirmed that during the 13th and 14th century, the castle belonged to the Lords of Montfort. It was also part of the goods of the family of Montfort with the Comper, Montfort, Montauban and Gaël castles.

The history of the site goes in pair with legends. It is said that during the 7th century, the castle was the residence of Judicaël, King of Domnonée, and that it had been the place where the King and saint Éloi met. This last was sent to bring peace in a fight for borders between Bretons and French.

The castle is structured into two classical elements: a courtyard and a barnyard, separated by a deep gap. Four buildings which could be guesthouses, are on both sides of the barnyard. The fortification and elements of the barnyard can still be seen.

During the 16th century, the castle was in ruin. The circumstances of the destruction of the fortified site of Boutavent remain mysterious. Maybe it has been dismantled during the War of succession (second half of the 14th century) or in 1373, during the campaign of Bertrand du Guesclin in Brittany, but nothing proves that the castle hasn't been inhabited then.

Many local authors of the 19th century wrote about Boutavent, in particular writers like Poignand, Vigoland or Oresve. Even though these stories constitute rare stories about the site, it is impossible to retrace the entire history of the castle, as there are only a few sources.

The castle has not been searched yet but many campaigns of consolidation of the relics took place since 2006. During these campaigns, archaeological material has been found (slate, ceramic, ground pavement and glazed tiles).
The site, controlled by Montfort Community, is open to the public since 2005. Maintaining works, strengthening the relics and promoting Boutavent, all three are done in collaboration with the ecomuseum of the district of Montfort, the Regional Archaeology Service and the Eureka Emplois Services welfare-to-work program.
