= Bédée =

Bédée Bedésc (Gallo) Bezeg (Breton)
- Commune
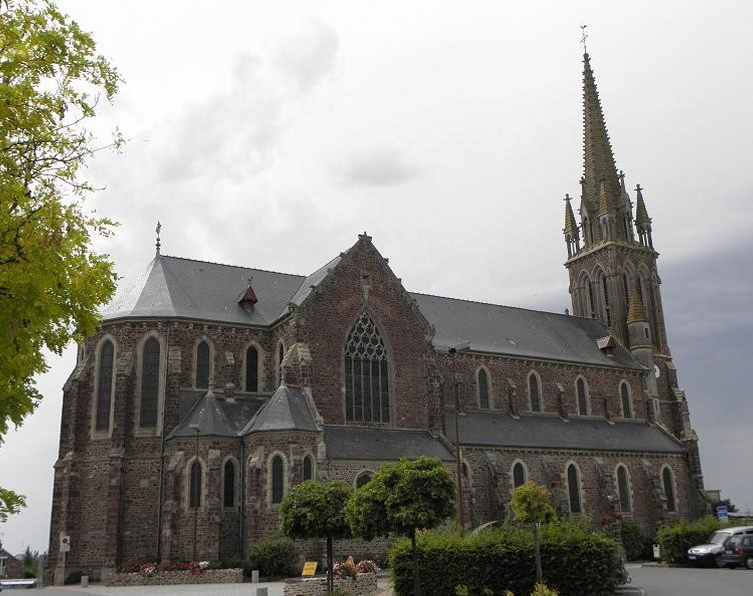
- Saint-Pierre Saint-Louis church

- Coat of arms
- Location of Bédée
- Location within France Location within Brittany
- Coordinates: 48°10′49″N 1°56′33″W
- Country: France
- Region: Brittany
- Department: Ille-et-Vilaine
- Arrondissement: Rennes
- Canton: Montfort-sur-Meu
- Intercommunality: Montfort Communauté

Government
  - Mayor (2020–2026): Joseph Thébault
- Area^{1}: 38.95 km^{2} (15.04 sq mi)
- Highest elevation: 119 m (390 ft)
- Lowest elevation: 32 m (105 ft)
- Population (2023): 4,662
  - Density: 119.7/km^{2} (310.0/sq mi)
- Time zone: UTC+01:00 (CET)
  - Summer (DST): UTC+02:00 (CEST)
- INSEE/Postal code: 35023 /35137
- ^{1} French Land Register data, which excludes lakes, ponds, glaciers > 1 km^{2} (0.386 sq mi or 247 acres) and river estuaries.

Bédée (French pronunciation: [bede]; Breton: Bezeg; Gallo: Bedésc) is a commune in the department of Ille-et-Vilaine in Brittany.
It is located in the northwest of France and is labeled as a village étape since 2009.

== Etymology ==
The name of Bédée may come from the Gaulish "Bedo" (= pit) or "betu" (= birch) and the suffix -iscum. The transcription of the name has changed: Bedesc in 1120, Bidisco in 1122 Bedensi in 1152, Bédec in 1187 and Bédiscum in 1330. It is from the 15th century that the name of Bédée appeared in its actual writing.

It can be mentioned that there is a character named Bède the Venerable, a monk living in England during the 8th century. This rare name looks curiously like Bédée. Some Anglo-Saxon monks colonised Brittany in a distant past and left their name: Saint Méen, Saint Malo, etc. Searches in that direction could enable to consolidate this hypothesis.

== Geography ==
Bédée is a town located in Montfort-sur-Meu county. It is at 20 km to the northwest of Rennes and is surrounded by Montfort-sur-Meu, Iffendic, La Nouaye, Breteil, Pleumeleuc, Talensac, Saint-Gonlay.

== History ==
=== Prehistory ===
During Prehistory, humans lived on the actual territory of Bédée. Indeed, prehistoric tools have been found (ex: polished axe) in villages such as la Morinais, la Rioulais and la Motte Besnard.

Archaeological excavations took place in 2011 on the site of the ZAC du Pont-aux-Chèvres and found a site dated from the Bronze Age.

=== Gallo-Roman period ===
During the Gallo-Roman period, men also lived on the territory of Bédée. Excavations have also been done and we found ceramics, vases, piece of pottery, and above all a statuette of a mother goddess in red terracotta in the village of la Métairie Neuve.

=== Middle Ages ===
It is from the 10th century that feudal mottes were developed. They were the first castles, built in wood and on heights, on mounds of earth. One of these feudal mottes can be found at the entrance of the town: the motte Jubin.

In 1122, Donoald, the bishop of Aleth gave the monks of Saint-Melaine de Rennes abbey the priory of Bédée which became then a parish. But it has been politically taken in charge by the Lord of Montfort-sur-Meu who took taxes and who did justice.

=== Modern times ===
The Lord Charles de Botherel, adviser in the Parliament of Brittany, proclaimed the town of Bédée independent in 1715. In 1744, he became Lord of Bédée. To show its prosperity, the town of Bédée knew a strong development of manors and castles at this time (The manor of the Blavon, destroyed in 1930).

=== French Revolution ===
The population of the town is in favour of the changes brought by the French Revolution, above all after the end of the reign of the Terror. The major revolutionary event is the one celebrating the execution of Louis XVI, accompanied by a hatred oath to the royalty and to the anarchy. It is celebrated since 1795.

== Population ==
Historical population

Year	Pop.	±% p.a.
1793	2,667	—
1800	2,442	−1.25%
1806	2,513	+0.48%
1821	2,709	+0.50%
1831	2,586	−0.46%
1841	2,540	−0.18%
1851	2,665	+0.48%
1861	2,512	−0.59%
1872	2,550	+0.14%
1881	2,594	+0.19%
1891	2,574	−0.08%
1901	2,408	−0.66%
1911	2,288	−0.51%
1921	2,089	−0.91%

Year	Pop.	±% p.a.
1931	2,163	+0.35%
1946	2,051	−0.35%
1954	1,822	−1.47%
1962	1,707	−0.81%
1968	1,745	+0.37%
1975	1,986	+1.87%
1982	2,726	+4.63%
1990	2,970	+1.08%
1999	3,296	+1.16%
2007	3,722	+1.53%
2012	4,030	+1.60%
2017	4,308	+1.34%
2023	4,662	+1.32%

Source: EHESS and INSEE

== Tourism ==
Tourism management in Montfort-sur-Meu is entrusted by Montfort Community to the Tourist Office of the district of Montfort.

== Sights ==
=== Buildings ===
Saint-Pierre Saint-Louis church The actual church has been built between 1885 and 1888 by the architect Arthur Regnault.

=== Touristic sites ===
Pond of Blavon The pond of Blavon is located at 1,5 km from the town and offers a pleasant environment to fishermen and tourists. Several hiking paths enable to discover the site and an educational path links the pond to the town centre of Bédée. Circuit de la Primaudière The starting point is at the church of Bédée. The circuit is 11,5 km long and lasts 3h00. Most paths are passable the whole year with no difficulty. The circuit goes next to the town of Pleumeleuc and Breteil. Circuit Nord The starting point is next to the church of Bédée. The circuit goes all the way to the town of Irodouër. It is 14 km long and lasts about 3h00.

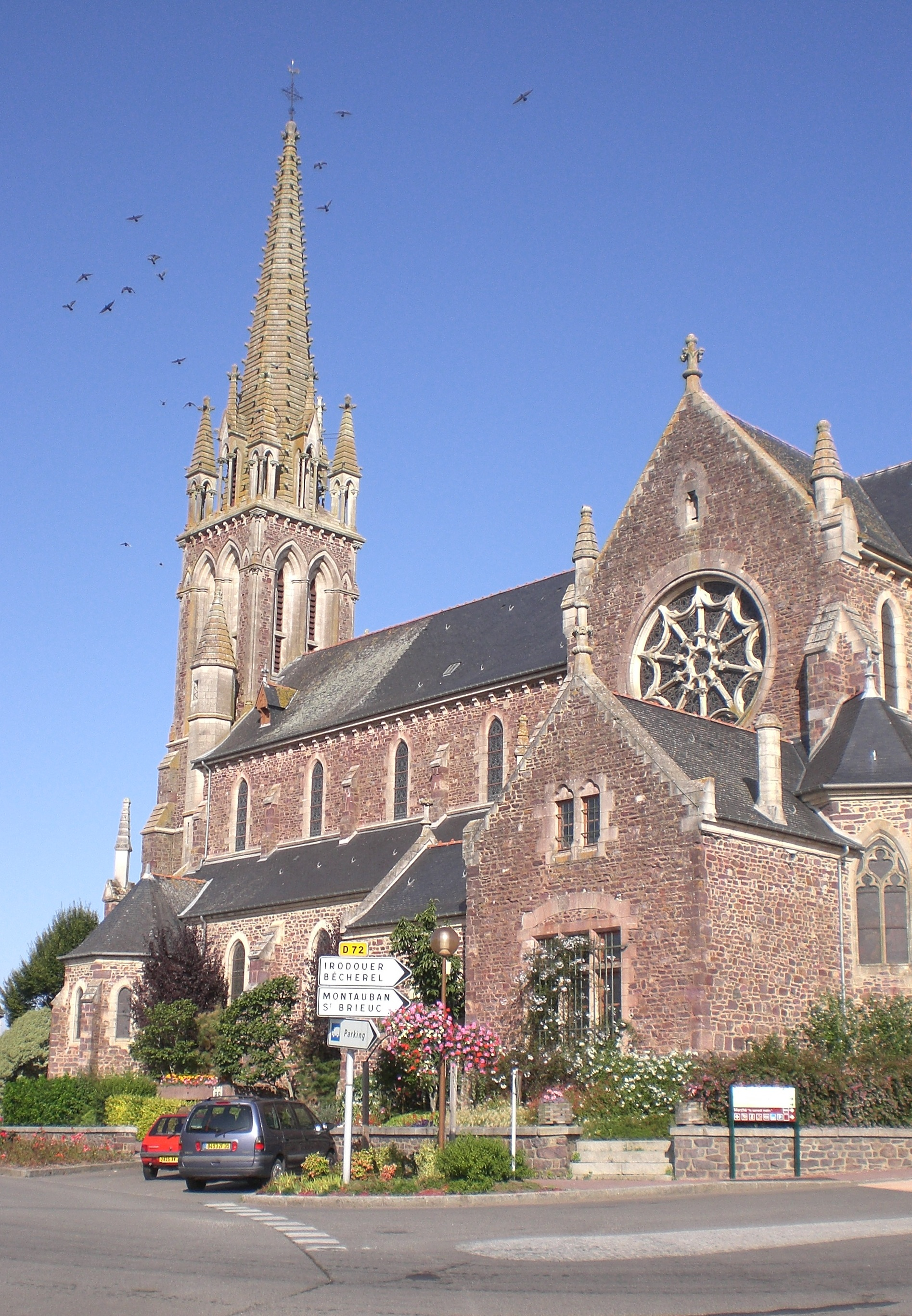
Church of Bédée

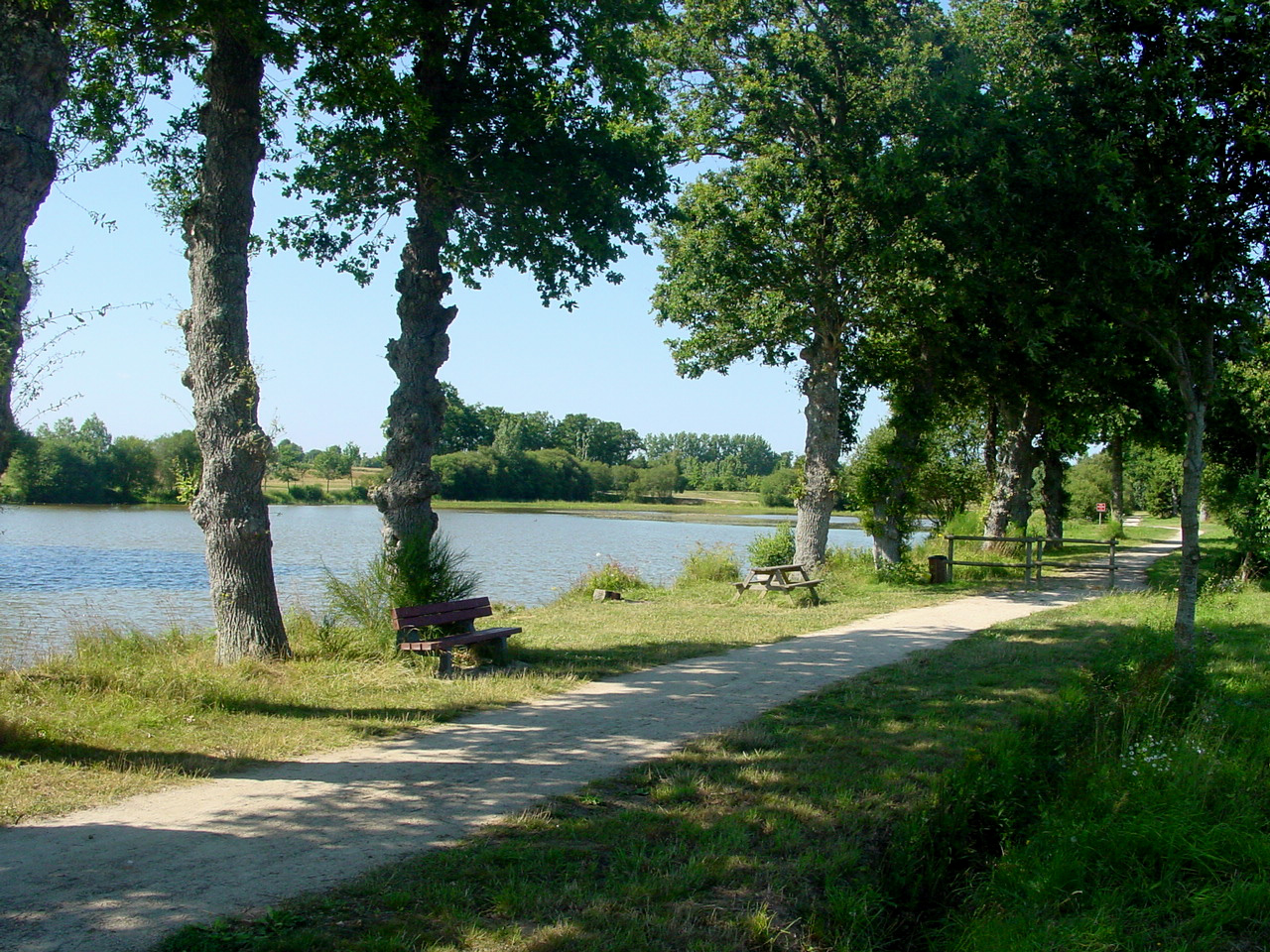
Pond of Le Blavon

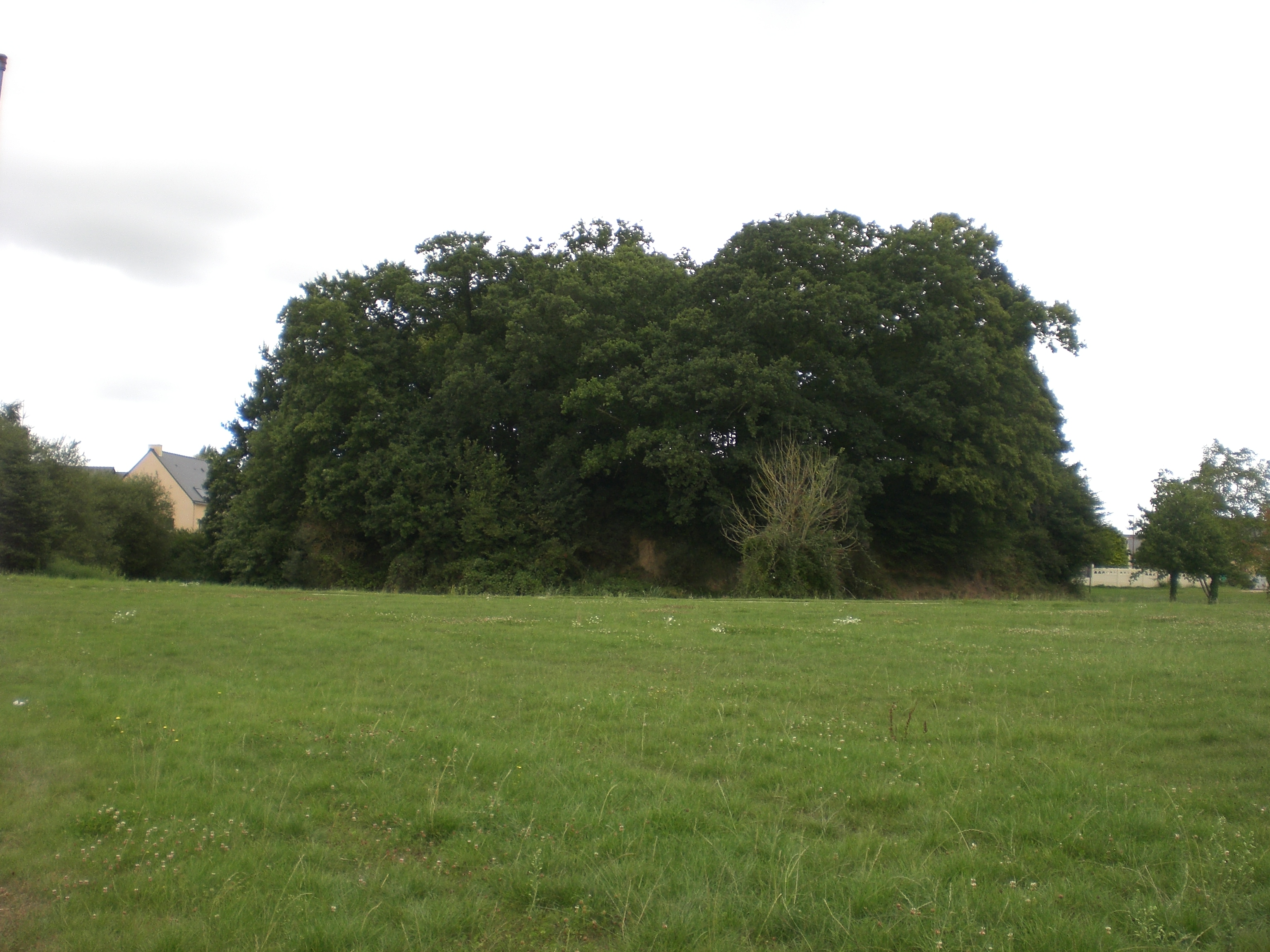
Feudal motte also known as the motte Jubin

== Notable people ==
- François Letexier, football referee who officiated in the 2026 FIFA World Cup

== See also ==
- Communes of the Ille-et-Vilaine department
- Emmanuel Guérin Sculptor Bédée war memorial
