= La Nouaye =

La Nouaye Lanwaz (Breton)
- Commune
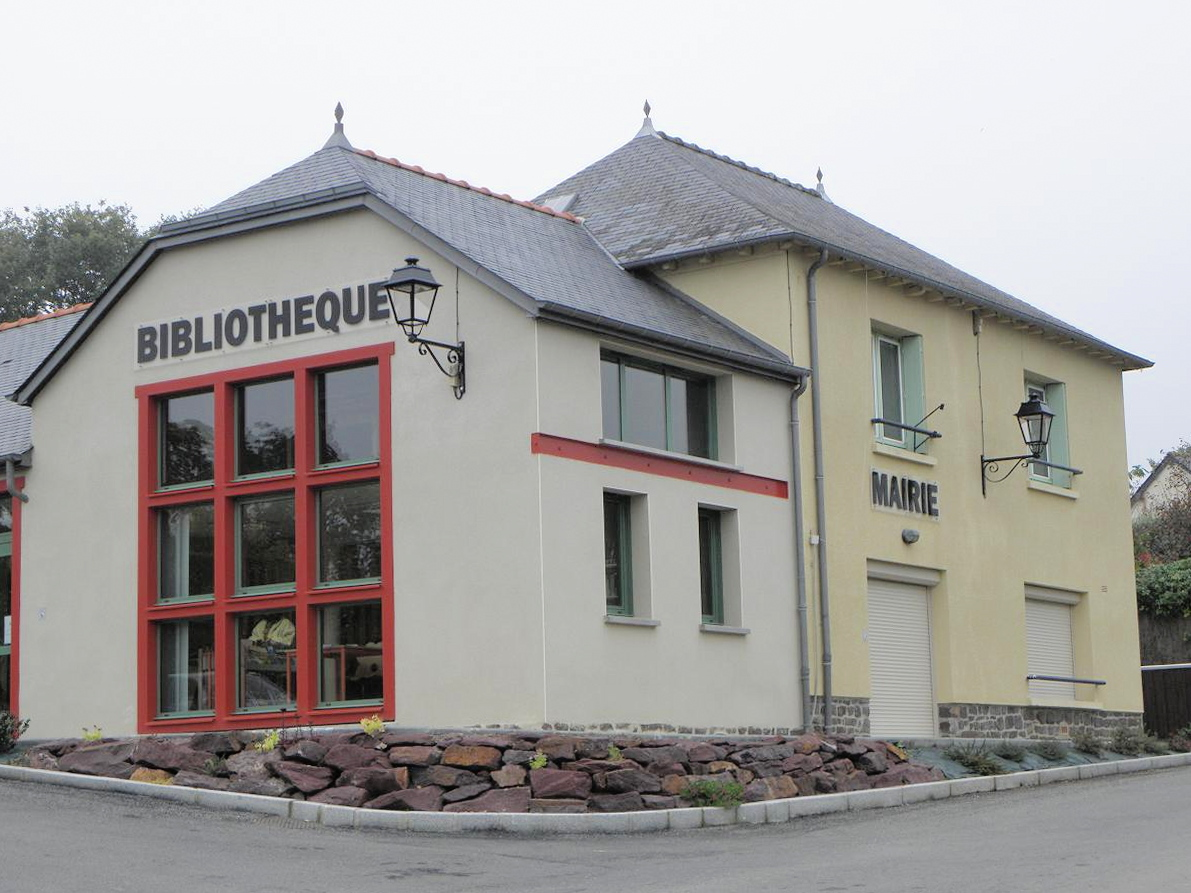
- The town hall of La Nouaye
- Location of La Nouaye
- Location within France Location within Brittany
- Coordinates: 48°09′48″N 1°58′41″W
- Country: France
- Region: Brittany
- Department: Ille-et-Vilaine
- Arrondissement: Rennes
- Canton: Montfort-sur-Meu
- Intercommunality: Montfort Communauté

Government
  - Mayor (2020–2026): Fabienne Bondon
- Area^{1}: 2.77 km^{2} (1.07 sq mi)
- Highest elevation: 76 m (249 ft)
- Lowest elevation: 38 m (125 ft)
- Population (2023): 362
  - Density: 131/km^{2} (338/sq mi)
- Time zone: UTC+01:00 (CET)
  - Summer (DST): UTC+02:00 (CEST)
- INSEE/Postal code: 35203 /35137
- ^{1} French Land Register data, which excludes lakes, ponds, glaciers > 1 km^{2} (0.386 sq mi or 247 acres) and river estuaries.

La Nouaye (Breton: Lanwaz) is a commune in the department of Ille-et-Vilaine in Brittany in the northwest of France.

== Population ==
Inhabitants of La Nouaye are called Lanoysiens in French.

Historical population
Year	Pop.	±% p.a.
1968	121	—
1975	107	−1.74%
1982	201	+9.42%
1990	202	+0.06%
1999	236	+1.74%
2007	257	+1.07%
2012	329	+5.06%
2017	357	+1.65%
2023	362	+0.23%
Source: INSEE

== Geography ==
The commune of La Nouaye is part of Montfort-sur-Meu county. It comes under the control of Rennes. It is surrounded by Montfort-sur-Meu, Bédée, Iffendic, Breteil, Pleumeleuc, Talensac, Saint-Gonlay.
It stretches over 272 hectares and it is mostly made of agricultural land.
Two brooks cross the village, one demarcating Iffendic and La Nouaye, the other crossing the town in the North of its territory.

== History ==
La Nouaye is an old parish, probably dating from the 9th century. It was written Lanoas in 1189, Lamnoê in 1516, La Nouais in the 18th century and Lanouaye in 1872.
The parish of La Nouaye, enclaved in the diocese of Saint-Malo, was part of the deanery of Bobital, coming under the diocese of Dol and which was under the term of Saint Etienne. During the year II of the Republic, we could count 201 inhabitants like in 1982.

== Tourism ==
Tourism management in Montfort-sur-Meu" is entrusted by Montfort Community to the Tourist Office of the district of Montfort.

== Buildings and touristic places ==
=== Buildings ===
Saint Hubert church and wayside cross The church, built at the end of the 15th century, is one of the most beautiful of the district of Montfort, thanks to the porch and the wayside cross. This last is located in the churchyard adjoining the church Saint Hubert. The porch allowed the sick and the leprous to attend the service, hence its name "the leprous porch". The relics of the wayside cross are classified Historical Monument.

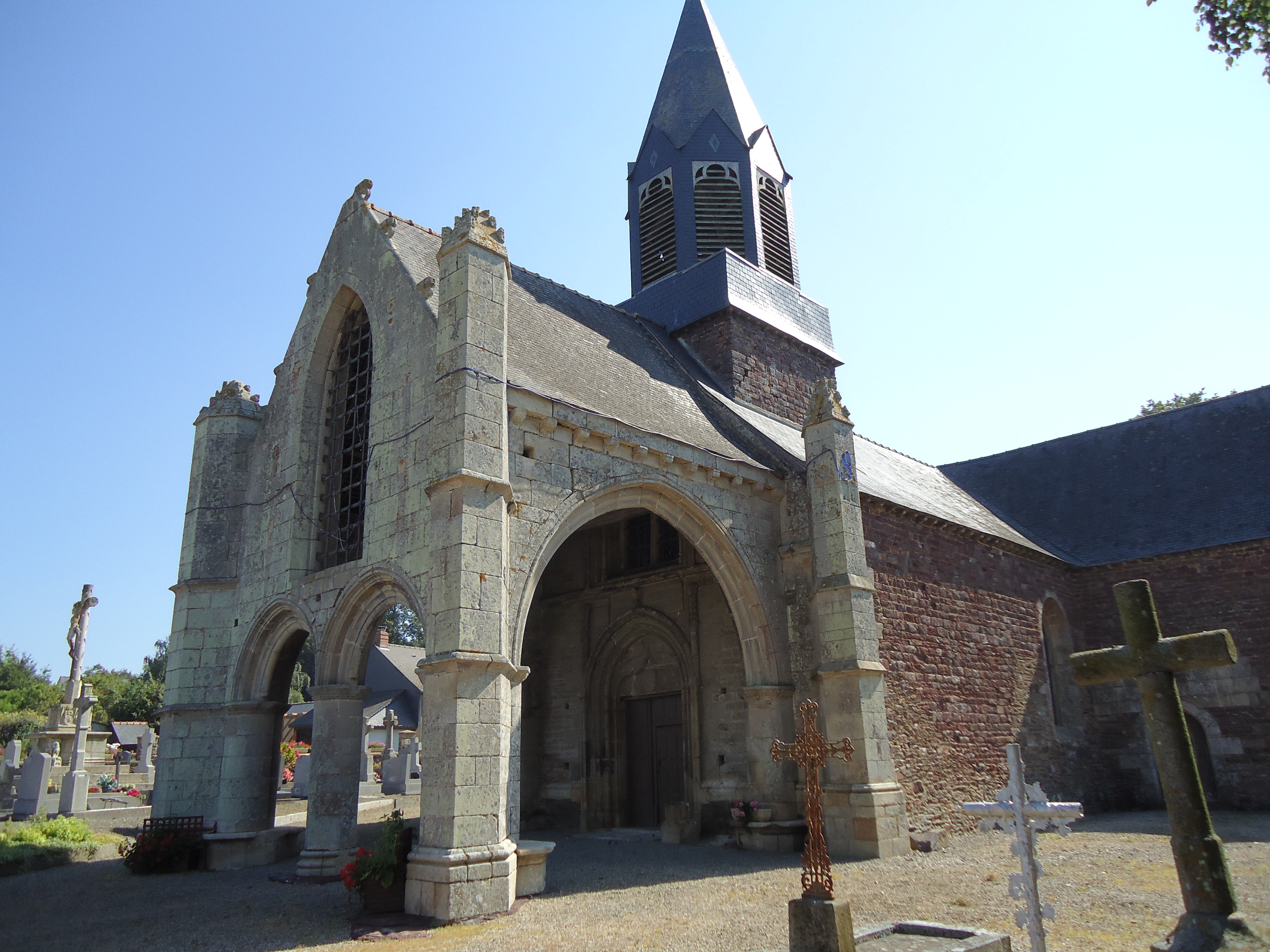
Church of La Nouaye with its porch

The leper hospital It was located at the place name "la ville es malades" and was burnt in 1591.

=== Touristic places ===
Le Circuit des 3 rivières The circuit starts in the town centre of La Nouaye, in the avenue called "allée du Calvaire". The hike lasts 3h30, on a distance of 15 km. You have to follow the yellow marking to discover the surroundings of La Nouaye and Bédée.
Le circuit de Blavon The starting point is near the town hall of La Nouaye for a 9 km hike lasting approximately 2h15, following the yellow marking. Passable path the whole year.

== See also ==
- Communes of the Ille-et-Vilaine department
