= Montfort-sur-Meu =

Montfort-sur-Meu Moñforzh (Breton)
- Commune
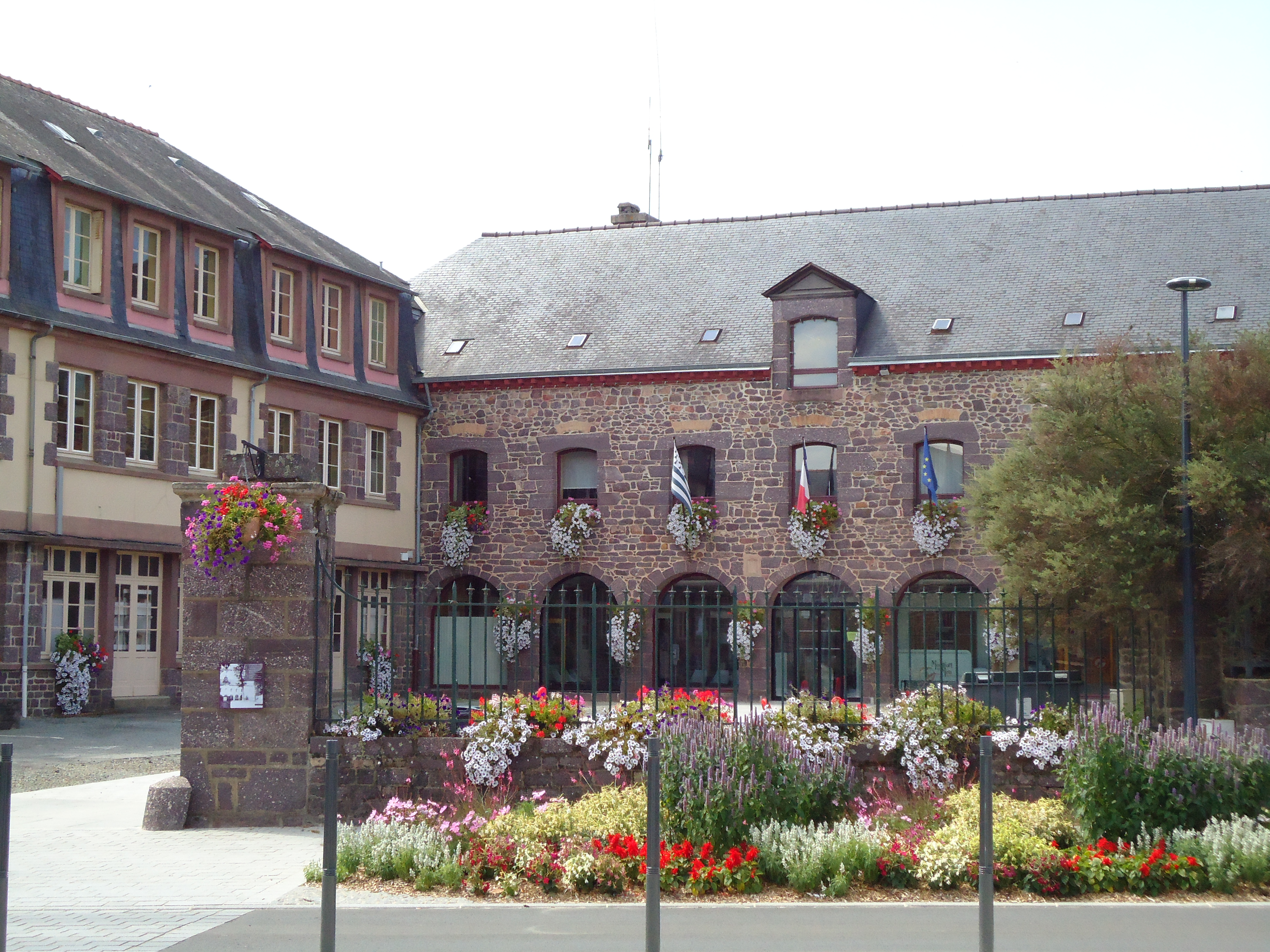
- The town hall of Montfort-sur-Meu

- Coat of arms
- Location of Montfort-sur-Meu
- Location within France Location within Brittany
- Coordinates: 48°08′19″N 1°57′17″W
- Country: France
- Region: Brittany
- Department: Ille-et-Vilaine
- Arrondissement: Rennes
- Canton: Montfort-sur-Meu
- Intercommunality: Montfort Communauté

Government
  - Mayor (2020–2026): Fabrice Dalino
- Area^{1}: 14.02 km^{2} (5.41 sq mi)
- Highest elevation: 131 m (430 ft)
- Lowest elevation: 28 m (92 ft)
- Population (2023): 6,810
  - Density: 486/km^{2} (1,260/sq mi)
- Time zone: UTC+01:00 (CET)
  - Summer (DST): UTC+02:00 (CEST)
- INSEE/Postal code: 35188 /35160
- ^{1} French Land Register data, which excludes lakes, ponds, glaciers > 1 km^{2} (0.386 sq mi or 247 acres) and river estuaries.

Montfort-sur-Meu (French pronunciation: [mɔ̃fɔʁ syʁ mø], literally Montfort on Meu; Breton: Moñforzh, before 1993: Montfort) is a commune in the department of Ille-et-Vilaine in Brittany in the northwest of France.

It is noted as the birthplace of the Roman Catholic Saint Louis de Montfort, who is considered to be the pioneer of the field of Mariology. The saint's birthplace is at 15, Rue de la Saulnerie. It is now jointly owned by the three Montfortian congregations he formed: the Community of the Holy Spirit, the Daughters of Wisdom and the Brothers of Saint Gabriel. It is the site of frequent "Montfortian pilgrimages" to Montfort-sur-Meu.

== Geography ==
The towns located next to Montfort-sur-Meu are Iffendic, Bédée, La Nouaye, Breteil and Talensac. Monterfil and Pleumeleuc are nearby.

The town is located at the convergence of the Meu river and the Garun river, in a farmland region which was in the past in the "Poutrecoët" (= the district in the woods), because it was covered by the big forest of Brocéliande. Its location on the Meu gives the commune its name.

The town is an administrative seat of a canton.

== Population ==
Inhabitants of Montfort-sur-Meu are called Montfortais in French.

Historical population

Year	Pop.	±% p.a.
1793	1,200	—
1800	1,115	−1.04%
1806	1,197	+1.19%
1821	1,316	+0.63%
1831	1,715	+2.68%
1836	1,772	+0.66%
1841	1,868	+1.06%
1846	1,979	+1.16%
1851	2,072	+0.92%
1856	2,129	+0.54%
1861	2,168	+0.36%
1866	2,345	+1.58%
1872	2,343	−0.01%
1876	2,297	−0.49%
1881	2,374	+0.66%
1886	2,373	−0.01%
1891	2,464	+0.76%
1896	2,452	−0.10%
1901	2,509	+0.46%

Year	Pop.	±% p.a.
1906	2,431	−0.63%
1911	2,309	−1.02%
1921	2,171	−0.61%
1926	2,253	+0.74%
1931	2,270	+0.15%
1936	2,250	−0.18%
1946	2,372	+0.53%
1954	2,518	+0.75%
1962	2,699	+0.87%
1968	2,965	+1.58%
1975	3,098	+0.63%
1982	4,301	+4.80%
1990	4,675	+1.05%
1999	5,412	+1.64%
2007	6,107	+1.52%
2012	6,472	+1.17%
2017	6,653	+0.55%
2023	6,810	+0.39%

Source: EHESS and INSEE (1968-2023)

== History and legend ==
=== History ===
Human beings have made their imprint on the district of Montfort en Brocéliande since prehistory. Ancient menhirs can be seen in the forest of Montfort, but it is at the end of the 11th century when the first castle is built.

From 1376 to 1389, the fortress, surrounded by four towers, was rebuilt by Raoul VIII. It was destroyed in 1627. The town is strengthened by fortifications. The town had three doors: Saint-Jean door, Coulon door and Saint-Nicolas door. The population of the town supported the changes brought by the French Revolution, after the Reign of Terror.
The major revolutionary event is the one celebrating the execution of Louis XVI, accompanied by a hatred oath to the royalty and to the anarchy. It is celebrated since 1795.

=== Legend ===
The legend of the duck is transmitted from one generation to another since the 15th century.

In the first version, the legend says that a young and beautiful girl, a prisoner of the Lord of Montfort, is moaning. She prays Saint Nicolas to escape from her abductor and to keep her virginity. The saint grants her prayers. She, miraculously transformed into a female duck, flies through the window of her cell and settles on the castle's pond.

Then, for many centuries, a wild female duck was coming every year in the church, around Saint Nicolas Day and was leaving one of her ducklings as an offering to the miraculous saint.

In the second version, the story says that around 1386, during the completion of the town, the lord locked a beautiful girl up in his castle. She understood very fast what was waiting for her and, catching sight of Saint-Nicolas Church, started praying the saint, promising to thank him if she could escape.

Unfortunately, she felt in the hands of the lord's soldiers, who wanted to do what they thought their master had done. She looked around to find some help but saw only two female ducks on the water of the pond, which has since been dried up. She prayed Saint Nicolas, begging him to allow the animals to be witnesses of her innocence and to make them accomplish every year her wish on her behalf if she had to lose her life. She managed to escape from the soldiers but died, apparently of fear, a bit later. She was buried in the Saint Nicolas churchyard.

However, the same year, during the Translation (when a saint is transferred from one place to another), while the crowd was flocking to the relics of Saint Nicolas, a female duck came in the church with her ducklings. She fluttered near the picture of the Saint, flew to the altar and saluted the crucifix. Then, she came back near the picture of the Saint and stayed there until the end of the service. At this moment, she flew with all of her ducklings, except one, who stayed in the church.

The story became so famous that as it is written in many documents dating from the following centuries, Montfort-sur-Meu became Montfort-la-Cane for more than 300 years.

Every time the female duck came to the church, it had been written on sheets. The last appearance is dated from 8 May 1739. However, as only the archives dating from later than the 15th century have been kept, many stories are missing even though, as an ecclesiastic said, "In the past, these events became so common that we were not taking time to write them anymore".

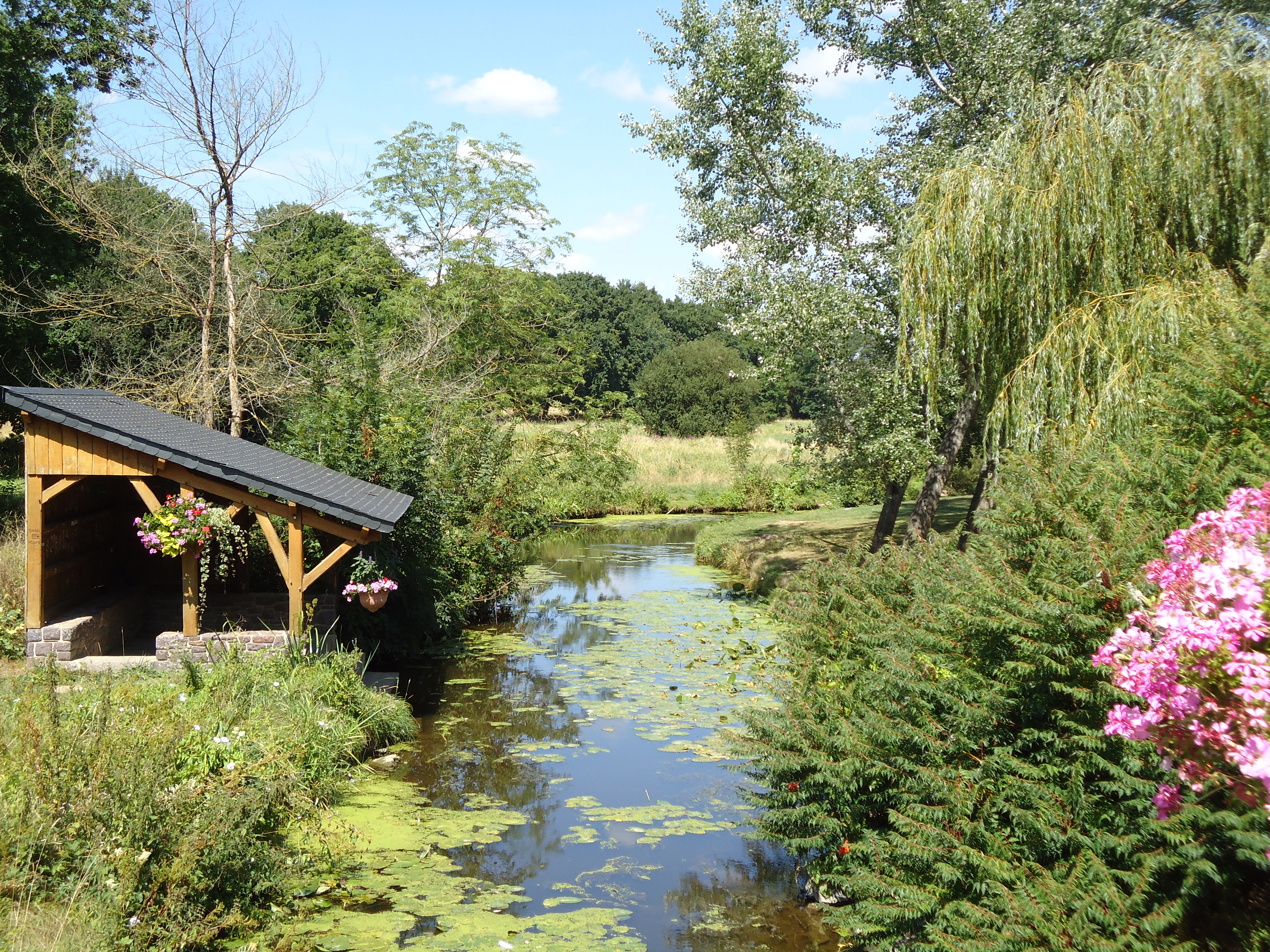
Pond in which the female duck stayed after escaping from the castle

== Economy ==
Montfort-sur-Meu has many places for accommodation: hotels, guesthouses, B&B, campsites and caravan parks. Every Friday morning there is a market on Place des Douves.

The town is also home to pig slaughterhouses for pork production, owned by Cooperl Arc Atlantique.

== Tourism ==
Tourism management in Montfort-sur-Meu is entrusted by Montfort Community to the Tourist Office of the district of Montfort.

== Buildings and touristic sites ==
Montfort-sur-Meu has kept the vestiges of its medieval past. We can still find old houses from the 16th century (Rue de la saulnerie), remains of Saint-Jean door (14th century), vestiges of the old castle, (14th century). From the medieval castle, there still is Papegaut Tower (14th century) which now houses the ecomuseum of the district of Montfort. But Montfort-sur-Meu also keeps traces from a religious past with several religious buildings; Saint-Jean chapel, the church of Saint Louis-Marie Grignion de Montfort, the Ursulines convent (which is nowadays the town hall), the cloister and the grave of Saint-Jacques de Montfort abbey, but also Saint Louis-Marie Grignion's native house (Rue de la Saulnerie).

=== Religious heritage ===
Saint Louis-Marie Grignion de Montfort lived in Montfort. There still are nowadays Saint-Louis-Marie-Grignion church, two chapels, and one abbey:

- Saint-Jacques de Montfort abbey: founded by Guillaume Ier de Montfort in 1152, the occidental wall is classified Historical Monument by the decree of the 6th of November 1997.
- Saint-Joseph chapel: built to replace the former Saint-Jean parish church. This last has been destroyed un 1851.
- Saint-Lazare chapel: At the beginning of the 18th century, the chapel has been restored by Saint Louis-Marie Grignion when he settled in Saint-Lazare.
- Saint-Louis-Marie-Grignion church: it is dated from the 19th century. It was inspired by the Italian style with its bell tower in the shape of a campanile which houses the Saint statue, born in Montfort-Sur-Meu.

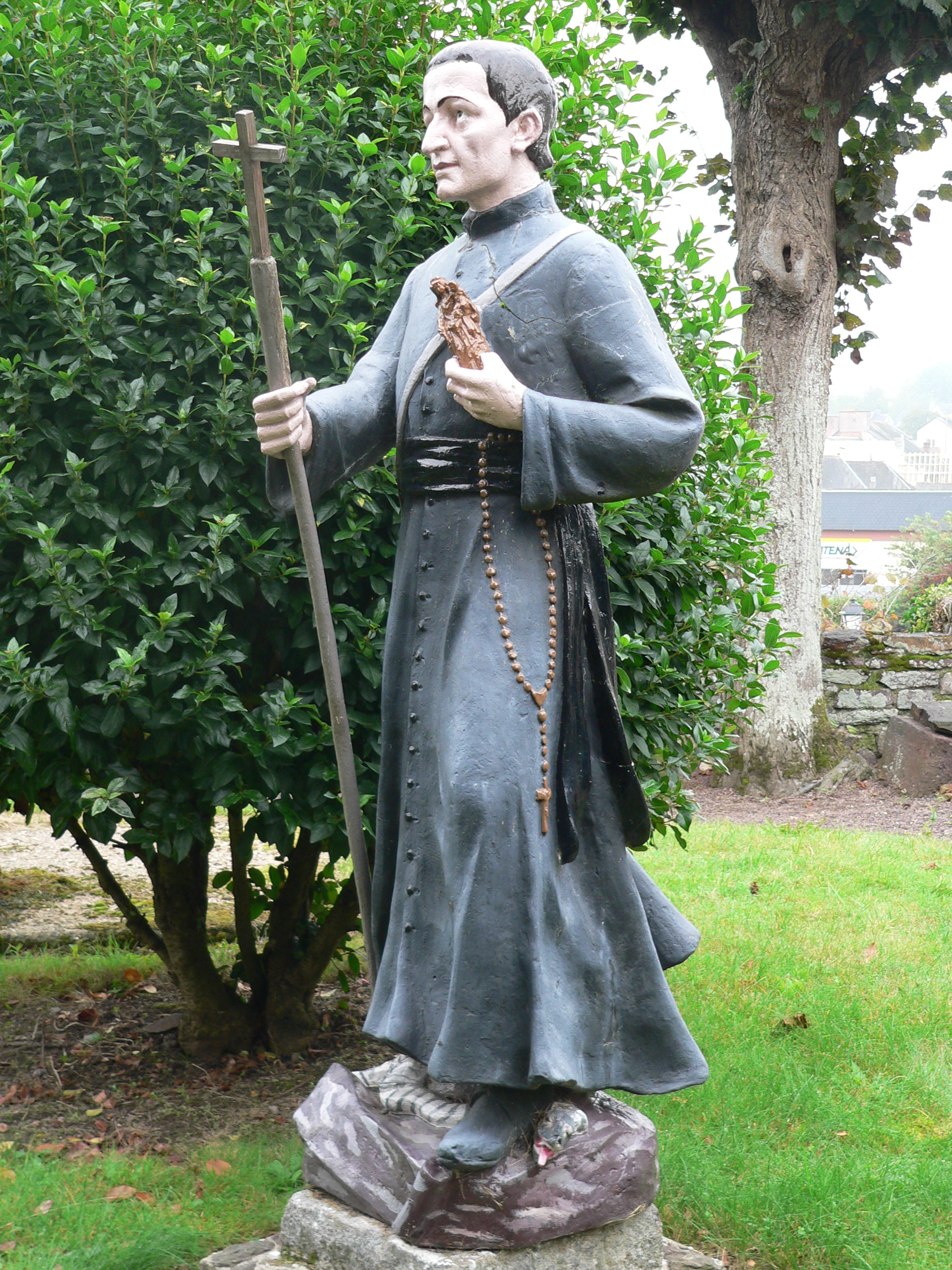
Saint Louis-Marie Grignion

=== Historical heritage ===
Surrounding wall of the medieval town To protect the marches of Brittany, the Dukes led a politic of fortification of the big towns. In 1376, Raoul VII got an authorisation to transform the castle into a real defensive fortress. Around the castle, an important fortification is built with towers and 3 doors. We can still find today the Tower of Papegaut, the Tower of Pas d'Âne, the Tower of Capitaine and parts of the former fortifications. These rampart vestiges are classified Historical Monuments since 15 December 1926.

Papegaut Tower Papegaut Tower dates from the 14th century. It is the best preserved element from the medieval town of Montfort-Sur-Meu and the most representative. The Tower is known as "Papegaut" because of a contest for archers and crossbowmen in which the target was a multicolour bird. During the 19th and 20th century, the tower became a prison. Since 1984, it houses the ecomuseum of the district of Montfort. The Tower is classified Historical Monument by the decree of 5 November 1926.

Hôtel Montfort Communauté During the 18th century, this building was a hotel for the Juguet family, a family of notables who settled in 1777. In 1857, the subprefecture takes its place until it is cut in 1926. During the 20th century, the hospital installed an annex. In 2002, Montfort Communauté bought the building and restored it.

Cultural centre of "l'Avant-Scène" In 1914 starts the building of a municipal hall and finishes after the war. The building also housed the first cinema of the town which could gather 400 people. Nowadays, the building is a cultural centre which offers many shows during the year.

Old houses of the town centre Today, we can find dozens of houses which were built between 1550 and 1650. They are located in the oldest streets of the town like for example rue de la Saulnerie, rue de l'Horloge, place de la cohue, rue de Gaël. We can also find the native house of Louis-Marie Grignion de Montfort.

Mills and "planks" on the Meu river In the street called "Rue du 11 juin 1977", we can see an old mill from 1884. It was also equipped at the time with of a footbridge called "planks", which crossed the Meu river and linked the street called "Ruelle des Moulins" (Mills street).

Driers and public baths The building is probably from the end of the 19th century. In the lower part were cubicles for public baths and a place reserved for boilers. The first floor, protected by wooden laths was used to dry clothes washed by washerwomen.

The town hall Today, the town hall is located in the former Ursuline convent who settled in 1639.

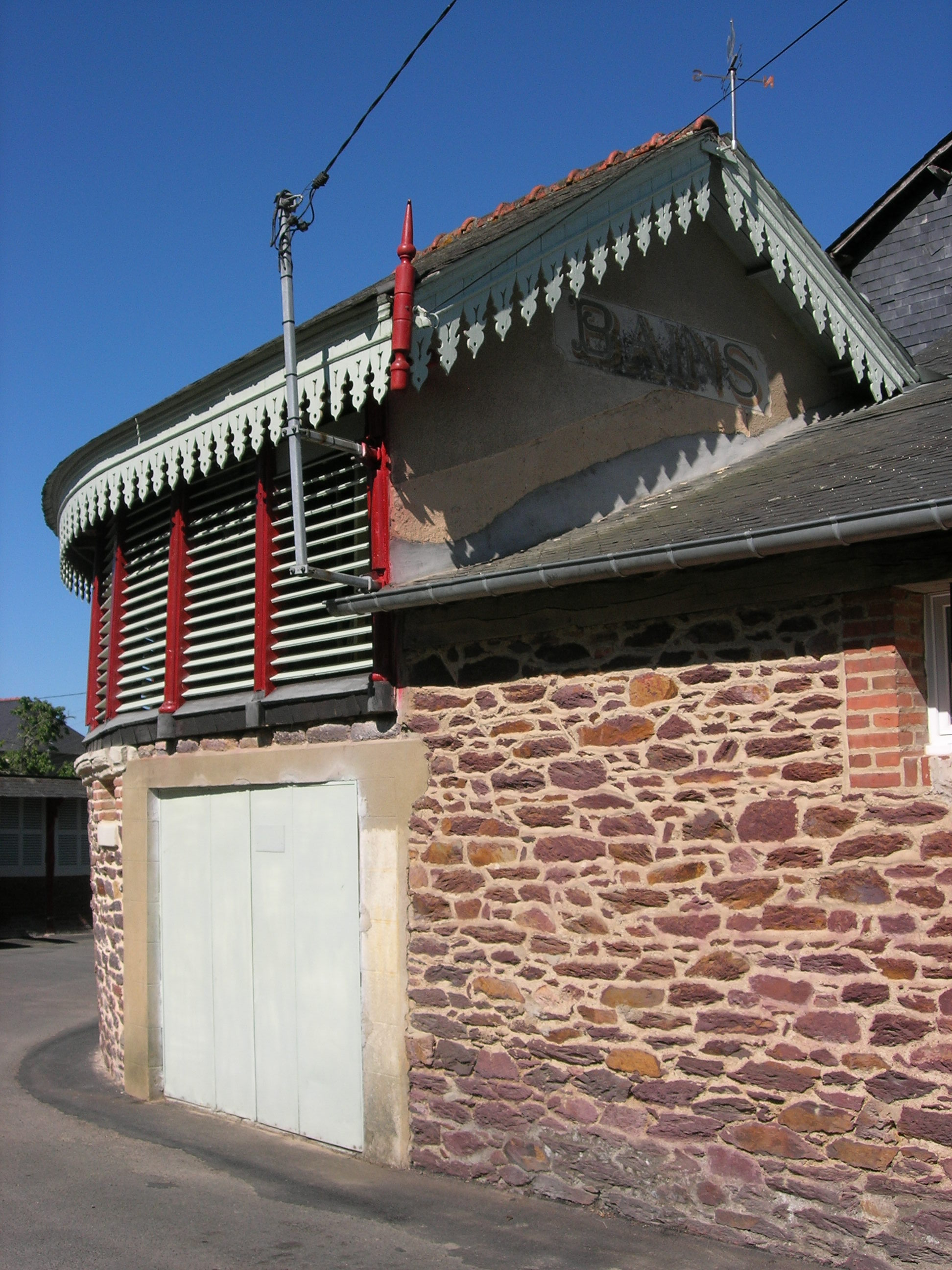
Public baths in Montfort-sur-Meu (credit: Emeline Mayrie)

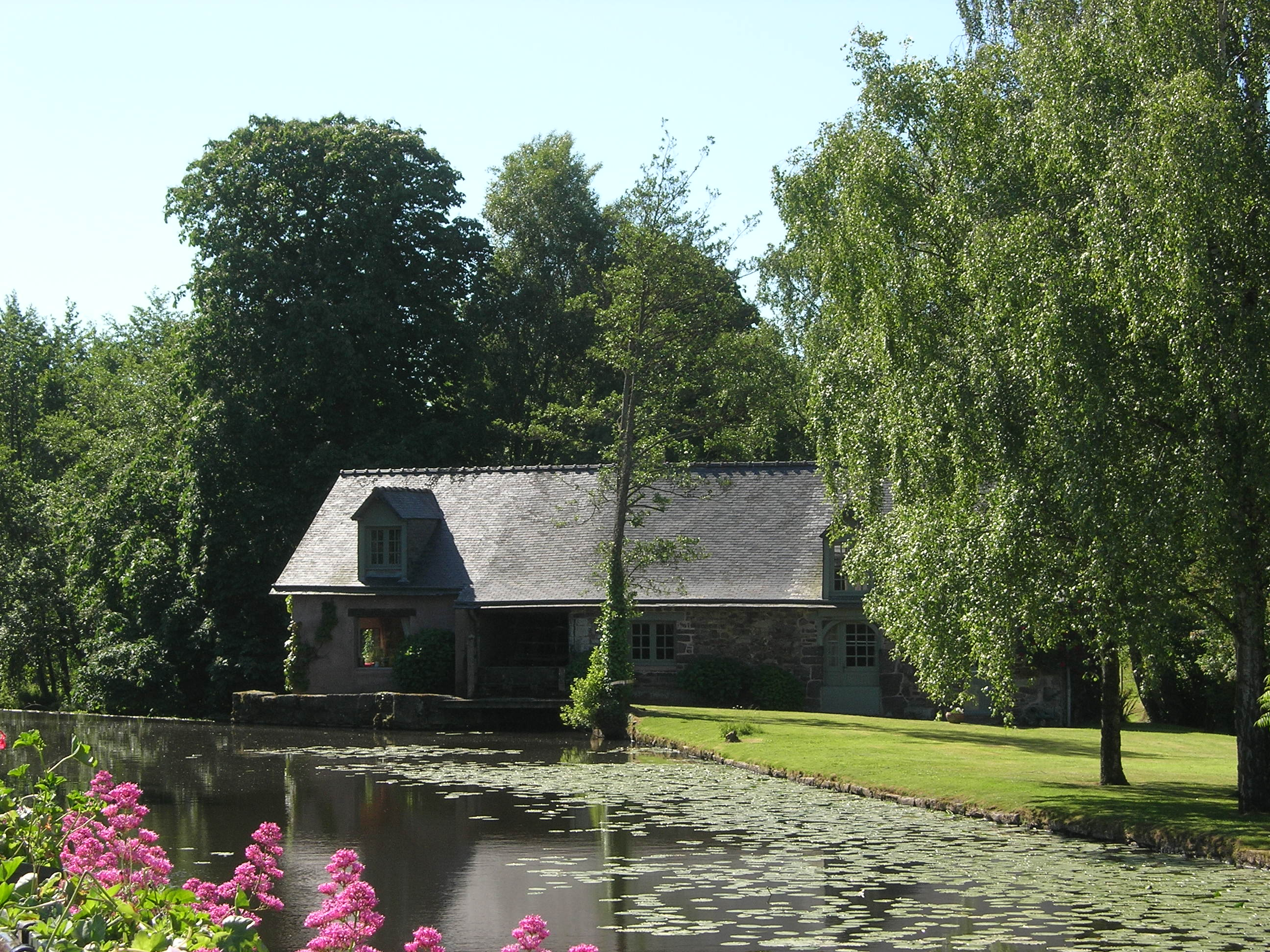
Driers in Montfort-sur-Meu (credit: Emeline Mayrie)

District course In 1799, Montfort became the headquarters of a subprefecture and of a courthouse. It was built between 1832 and 1834. A break is marked between the old houses from the medieval town and the courthouse, as this last one turns its back to the medieval town.

== Sites and natural areas ==
Forest of Montfort-Sur-Meu It covers a few hundred hectares, including 40 hectares which are a communal property on the area of Saint-Lazare woods. Several marked paths allow going across this wooden limestone, by foot, by horse and for some people, by bike.

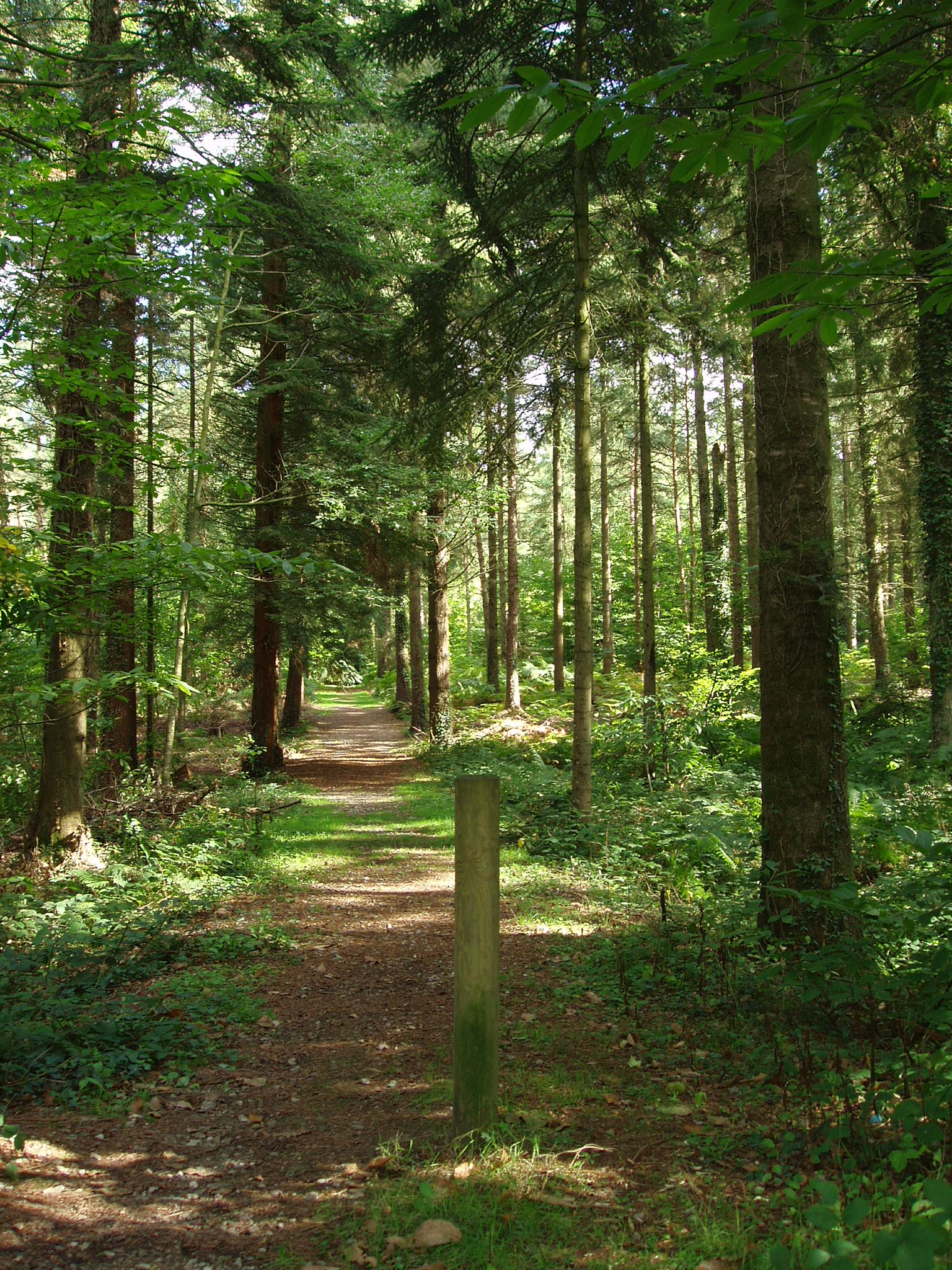
Forest of Montfort-sur-Meu

Parc Municipal Edouard Guicheteau, mayor of the town from 1853 to 1871, bought for private use the old meadows of the Thabor, possessions of the prior Saint Nicolas, to convert them into an English garden. He diverted the Garun to assure the water circulation and planted yews and exotic conifers. In 1950, the park is bought by the town and opened to the public. The old meadows that stayed wild were then converted into a municipal campsite.

== Tourist activities ==
- Many visits and activities are offered in the district of Montfort:

Visit with a GPS guide (Montfort-sur-Meu) Visit with a GPS guide allows tourists to visit Montfort-sur-Meu through an interactive walk at their own leisure in family or in a small group thanks to automatic sound and visual activities. The circuit through the medieval town lasts an hour.

- Legacy and botanical path (Montfort-sur-Meu)

This path, made of two loops located in the heart of the district of Montfort, offers the viewing of diversified natural places (humid meadow, landscape parkland, shores, pond, sunken lanes, hedged farmlands, woods). Displays explain historica, and biological significance of the different areas. The circuit also highlights the traditional local dairy industry.

- Historical path of Montfort (Montfort-sur-Meu)

This walking path displays the evolution and development of the town from the Middle Ages to the present. Thirty displays are posted on the path.

- Discovery circuit of Montfort (Montfort-sur-Meu)

A 2/3 km walking circuit highlighting the built heritage of the town and the remains of the fortifications remaining from the Middle Ages. The visit lasts around an hour and a half.

- Guided tour of Montfort by canoeing

With the ecomuseum of the district of Montfort and the canoeing club of the district of Brocéliande, original visits make you discover the environment, the historical site of Montfort-sur-Meu from the river.

- Montfort Ecomuseum

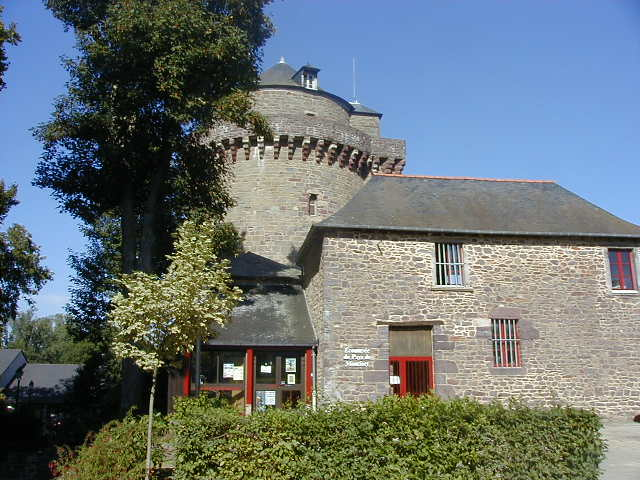
Ecomuseum of Montfort

Located in Papegaut Tower, the ecomuseum invites you to discover the culture of the district where history and legends are very close. Different permanent exhibitions are offered (the duck legend, the architecture of the district of Brocéliande, Montfort during the Middle Ages, the traditional suit, games about nature).

You can also find many pedestrian paths around Montfort-sur-Meu and a big swimming pool in the town centre.

== See also ==
- Communes of the Ille-et-Vilaine department
