= Iffendic =

Iffendic Fendic (Gallo) Ilfentig (Breton)
- Commune
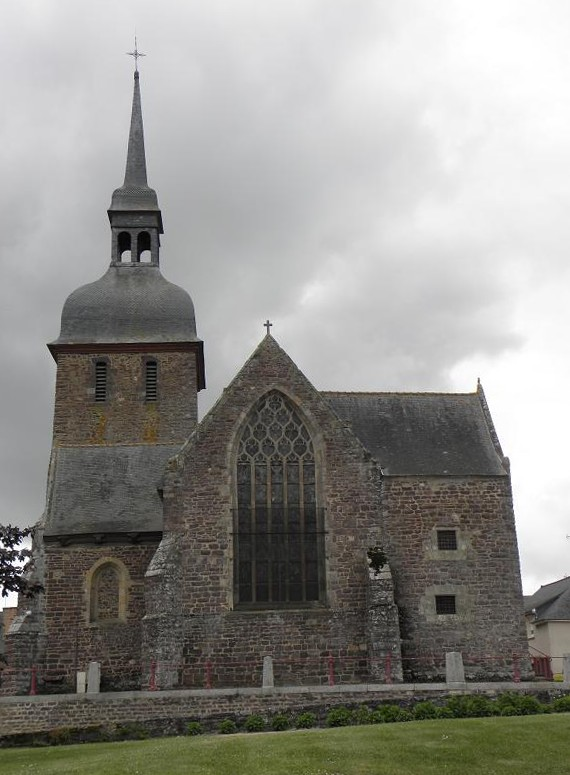
- The church of Saint-Éloi in Iffendic

- Coat of arms
- Location of Iffendic
- Location within France Location within Brittany
- Coordinates: 48°07′52″N 2°01′57″W
- Country: France
- Region: Brittany
- Department: Ille-et-Vilaine
- Arrondissement: Rennes
- Canton: Montfort-sur-Meu
- Intercommunality: Montfort Communauté

Government
  - Mayor (2020–2026): Christophe Martins
- Area^{1}: 73.66 km^{2} (28.44 sq mi)
- Highest elevation: 134 m (440 ft)
- Lowest elevation: 32 m (105 ft)
- Population (2023): 4,609
  - Density: 62.57/km^{2} (162.1/sq mi)
- Time zone: UTC+01:00 (CET)
  - Summer (DST): UTC+02:00 (CEST)
- INSEE/Postal code: 35133 /35750
- ^{1} French Land Register data, which excludes lakes, ponds, glaciers > 1 km^{2} (0.386 sq mi or 247 acres) and river estuaries.

Iffendic (French pronunciation: [ifɛ̃dik]; Breton: Ilfentig; Gallo: Fendic) is a commune in the department of Ille-et-Vilaine in Brittany. It is located in the North West of France.

== Geography ==
The towns nearby are Montfort-sur-Meu, La Nouaye, Bédée, Pleumeleuc, Saint-Gonlay, Talensac and Breteil.
By its surface, Iffendic is at the third rank of the towns in the department, after Paimpont and Martigné-Ferchaud.
The Meu river goes through the town.

== Population ==
Historical population
Year	Pop.	±% p.a.
1968	2,528	—
1975	2,416	−0.65%
1982	2,580	+0.94%
1990	2,675	+0.45%
1999	3,047	+1.46%
2007	3,915	+3.18%
2012	4,410	+2.41%
2017	4,469	+0.27%
2023	4,609	+0.52%
Source: INSEE

Inhabitants of Iffendic are called Iffendicois in French.

== History ==
Iffendic was located on the crossroad of two Roman ways; the North/South way from Corseul to Nantes and the East/West way from Rennes to Carhaix. We can also mention other older traces from the Gallo-Roman period with the menhir of Pierre Longue (Neolithic) near the villages of La Barre and Vau-Savelin. Normans devastated the district during the 10th century and the church changed of place, it was not at the edge of the Meu river anymore. The church was rebuilt in 1122 by a certain Jacob, at the place where the church is now. In 1189, the church of Iffendic was given to Noirmoutier en Touraine abbey which founded then a priory in the region. After the settlement of the Benedictines, the diocese of Saint-Malo kept sizeable rights on the parish of Iffendic. The parish was divided into 11 sections, in particular to collect taxes: the town centre, Allansac, la Barre, Boutavent, Canlou, Couacurel, Pintillac, Tréez, Tréhieuc, Trévit, and Vaubeuzet. During the Middle Ages, Iffendic had many buildings on its own territory, like castles and manors. The castle of Boutavent (12th century) accommodated the Lords of Montfort when the castle of Montfort had been destroyed. They stayed in Boutavent during nearly two centuries before settling back to their former castle: the one in Montfort. After that, the site seemed to be abandoned but nothing proves that it hasn't been inhabited then.

The population of the town is in favour of the changes brought by the French Revolution, above all after the end of the reign of the Terror. The major revolutionary event is the one celebrating the execution of Louis XVI, accompanied by a hatred oath to the royalty and to the anarchy. It is celebrated since 1795.

== Tourism ==
Tourism management in Montfort-sur-Meu is entrusted by Montfort Community to the Tourist Office of the district of Montfort.

== Buildings ==
L'Aparté, is a place for contemporary art.

The town has two Historical Monuments:

- The church Saint-Eloi, with a flamboyant Gothic style, has a splendid stained glass window (1542). The porch (1607) is topped by a gallery used as an ossuary. The stained glass window and the gate are classified Historical Monument by the decree of 11 June 1926.
- The castle of La Chasse is dated from 1895. The low relief sculpted by Jean-Antoine Houdon in 1781 and kept in the Louvre, has been classified by the decree of 1 September 1930.

The town has also got 378 inventory sheets, including:

- Saint Barthelemy chapel
- The castle of Treguil which is dated at least from the 16th century. It was the property of earls of Montfort and was also part of the defence of the town. The castle, as we can see it nowadays, is a reconstruction from the beginning of the 19th century, around 1820. The northwestern detached house is the oldest part of the castle. It houses a wooden spiral stairway and a fireplace from the 14th or 15th century.
- The castle of Breil was built around 1860-1863. It had a Neo-Renaissance style but it has been badly damaged with a fire during the night of 27–28 June 1903.
- Castle of Le Pin. This residence was built during the 19th century where a former manor was. Nowadays, this small castle houses a guesthouse and Bed & Breakfasts.
- Castle of La Morinais.
- Ruins of the castle of Boutavent.
- Former shophouses in the town centre. Traces from the medieval commercial activity of the town can be seen thanks to several shophouses located in the town centre, rue de Gaël and Boulevard de la Trinité.
- Three megalithic buildings.
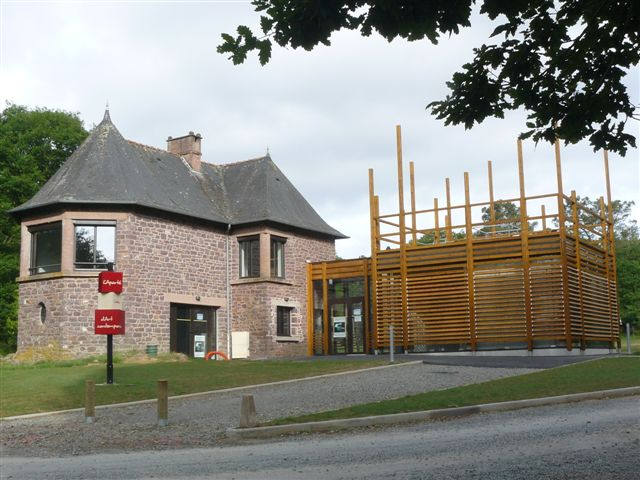
Aparté in Iffendic

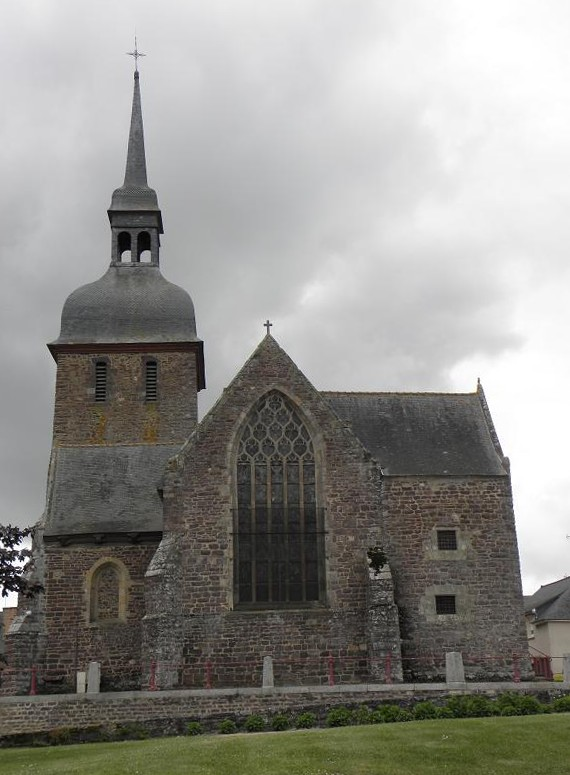
Church Saint Eloi in Iffendic (crédit: GO69)

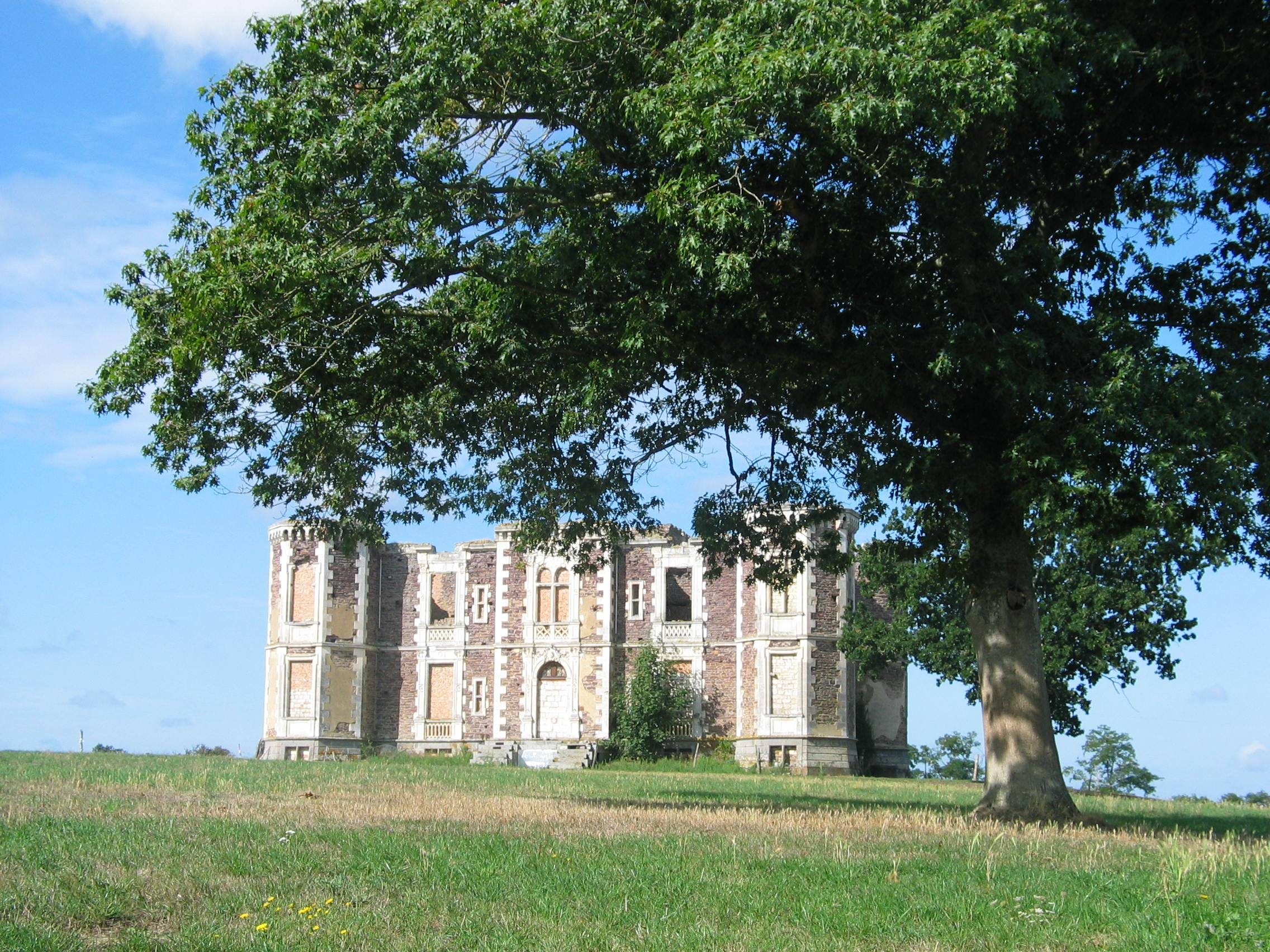
Castle of Le Breil in Iffendic

== Natural sites ==
- Valley of the Chambre au Loup. Located at 2 km from the land of Trémelin, the valley of the Chambre au loup offers a beautiful landscape. This valley has been dug by a subsidence due to rifts which appeared in the fold of the schist, and to the erosion caused by the river. It has 70 hectares of wooded moors, high cliffs in which the dizziest is 35m high. This "small canyon" also offers pedestrian hikes in a pleasant and natural environment. This site is so called because it is said that in one of the cliff’s caves is where the last wolf of the region lived.
- The land of Trémelin (French: Domaine de Trémelin) is a natural site stretching over more than 220 hectares. The site has a big forest, moors, and areas classified as a natural area of ecological, faunistic and floristic interest, but also one of the principal "oligodystrophes" ponds (pond with very slow plant dynamics) in Ille-et-Vilaine. Many trails (including the one going around the pond) allow exploration of site. Trémelin leisure base also offers diversified leisure activities. Since May 2010, on the land of Trémelin, can be found a place for contemporary art called L'Aparté.
- The land of Careil. Departmental natural area of 96 hectares, it gathers many birds of many different species. An ornithological observatory is at the disposal of the public, in particular to observe migratory or winter birds. It is a land which has a pond called the pond of Careil. The pond, dried up during the 19th century, was rebuilt.
- The land of Boutavent. Located near the land of Trémelin and the Chambre au loup, the land of Boutavent is marked with the imprint of an old feudal castle built by the Lords of Montfort (From the 12th to the 14th century). Interpreting boards allow visitors to understand the history of the site. It also constitutes a "conservatory" of landscapes where forests, moors and hedged farmlands are next to each other.
- Forest of Iffendic. It stretches over more than 300 hectares and is principally located around the land of Trémelin, the Chambre au Loup, and the mill of Le Casse. The trees we can find in the forest are mostly oaks, beeches and pines. Many paths are accessible by foot, by bike and for some people, by horse.
- Arboretum. Created in 2003, the arboretum offers a place for a walk in the heart of the town of Iffendic. Indeed, a marked path allows to walk through the sculptures of local artists on the edge of the Meu river.
- Valley of Le Casse. Adorned of rocky puddingstone blockfield, big cracks cut the rock. In one of them, a beautiful oak seems to be fixed to the side.
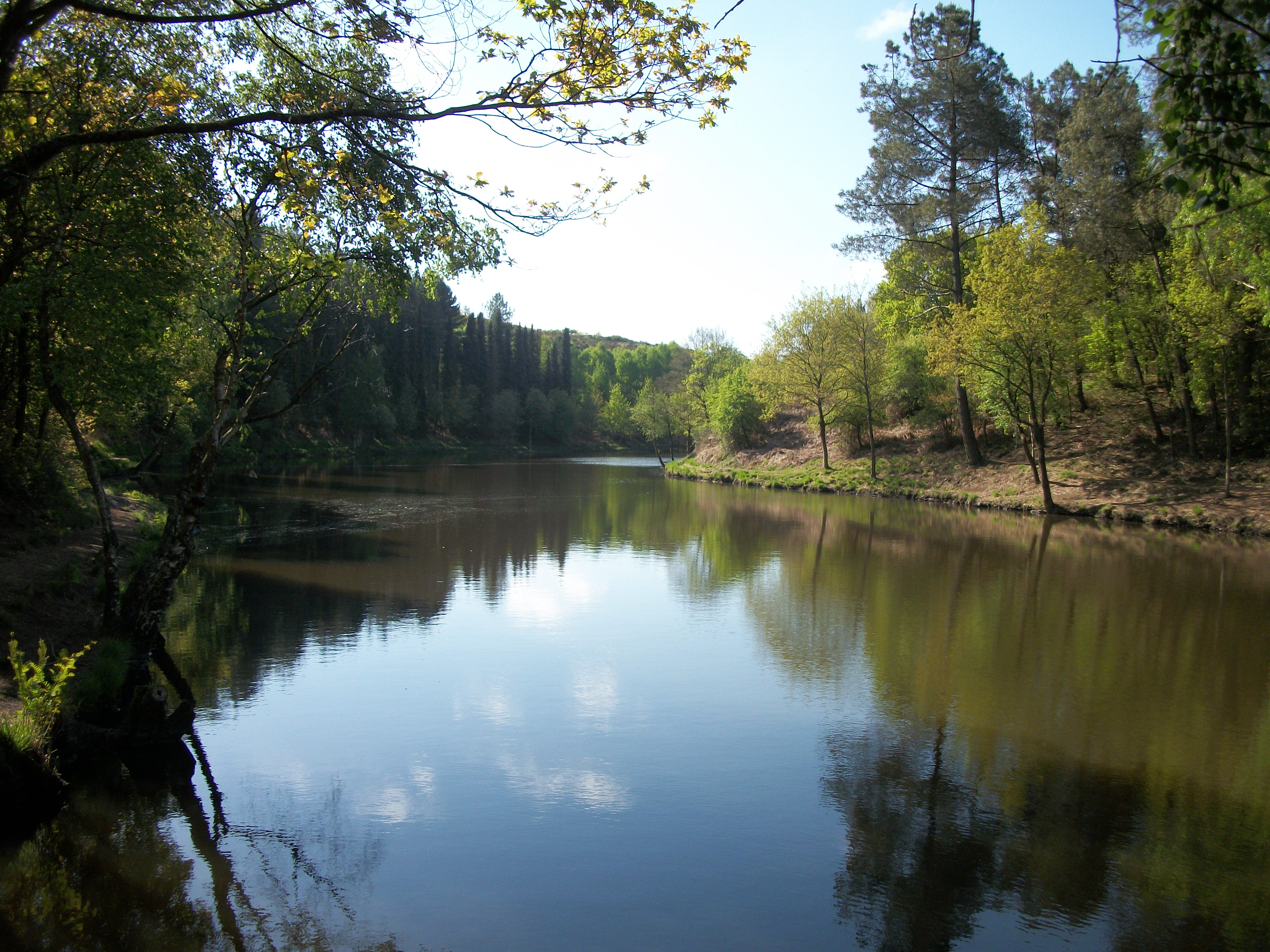
Chambre au Loup

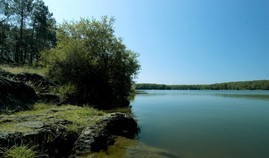
Land of Trémelin

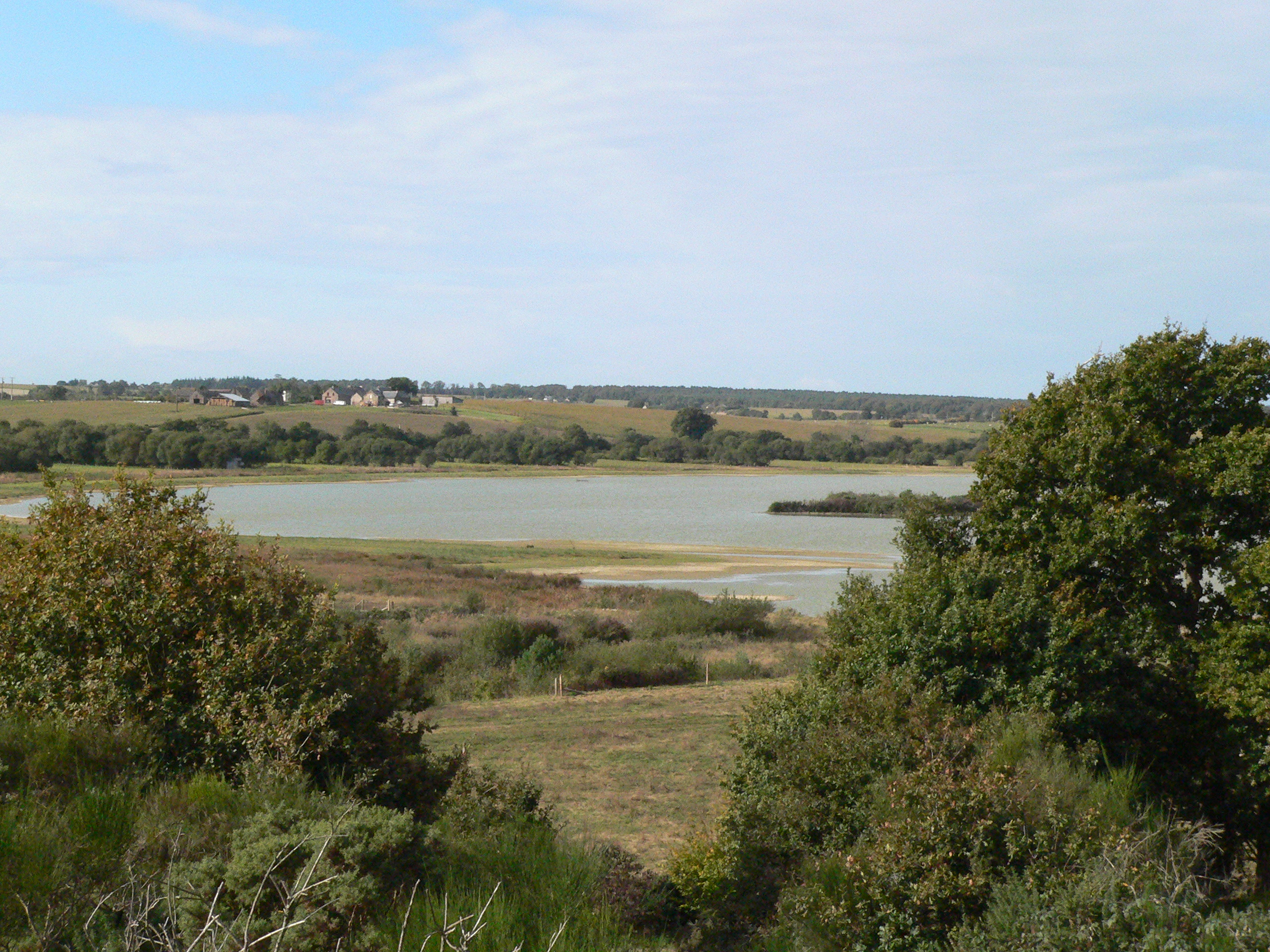
Pond of Careil

== See also ==
- Communes of the Ille-et-Vilaine department
