= Breteil =

Breteil Beurteuil (Gallo) Brezhiel (Breton)
- Commune
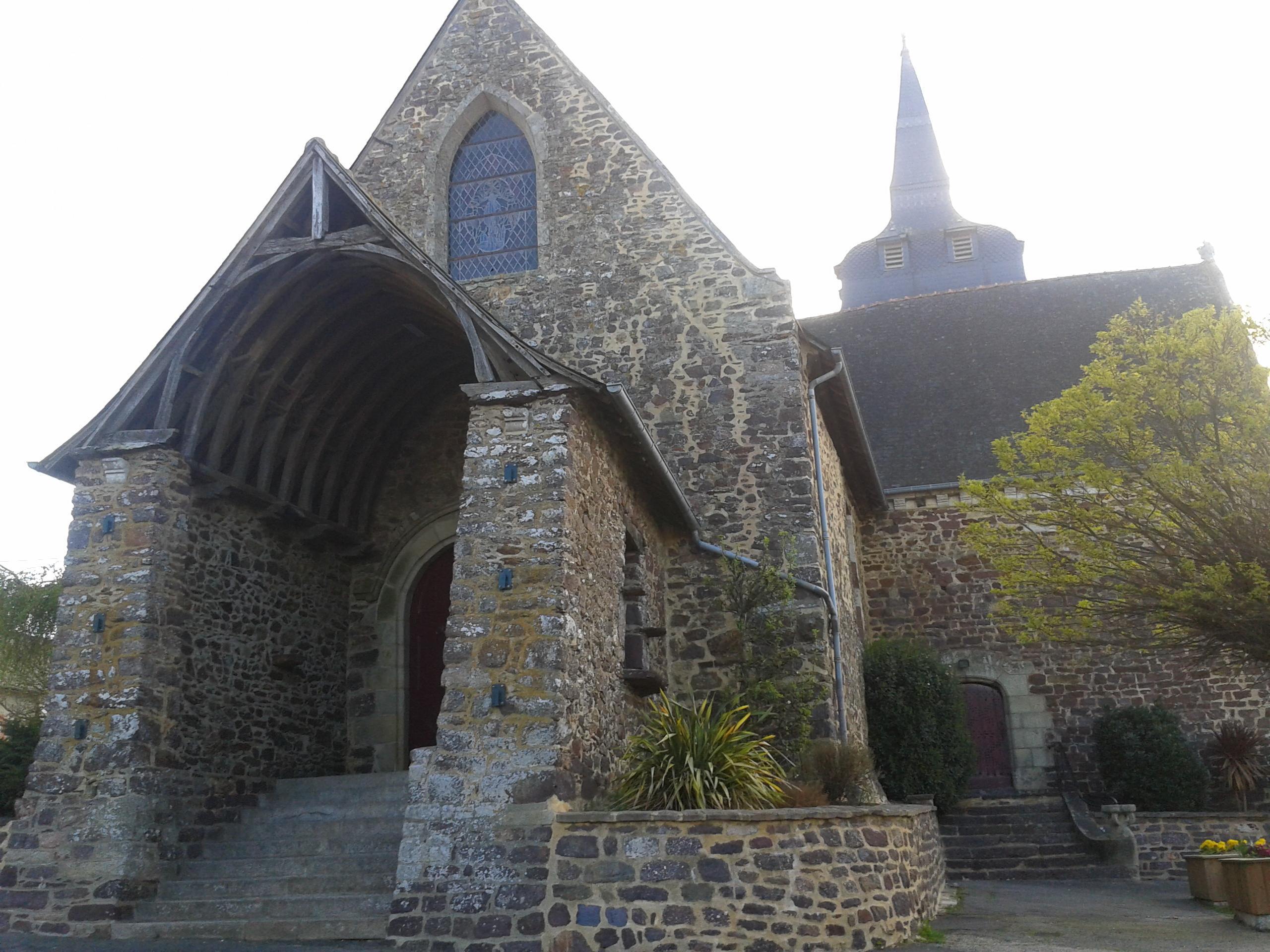
- The church of Breteil

- Coat of arms
- Location of Breteil
- Location within France Location within Brittany
- Coordinates: 48°08′46″N 1°53′50″W
- Country: France
- Region: Brittany
- Department: Ille-et-Vilaine
- Arrondissement: Rennes
- Canton: Montfort-sur-Meu
- Intercommunality: Montfort Communauté

Government
  - Mayor (2020–2026): Isabelle Ozoux
- Area^{1}: 14.7 km^{2} (5.7 sq mi)
- Highest elevation: 71 m (233 ft)
- Lowest elevation: 26 m (85 ft)
- Population (2023): 3,675
  - Density: 250/km^{2} (647/sq mi)
- Time zone: UTC+01:00 (CET)
  - Summer (DST): UTC+02:00 (CEST)
- INSEE/Postal code: 35040 /35160
- ^{1} French Land Register data, which excludes lakes, ponds, glaciers > 1 km^{2} (0.386 sq mi or 247 acres) and river estuaries.

Breteil (French pronunciation: [bʁətɛj]; Gallo: Beurteuil, Breton: Brezhiel) is a commune in the department of Ille-et-Vilaine in Brittany. It is located in northwestern France.

== Geography ==
The river Meu forms the commune's southwestern border. Breteil is part of the canton of Montfort-sur-Meu and the arrondissement of Rennes. The town has 3502 inhabitants and covers 1470 hectares. It is surrounded by the towns of Montfort-sur-Meu, Bédée, La Nouaye, Iffendic, Pleumeleuc, Talensac, Saint-Gonlay.

== Population ==
Inhabitants of Breteil are known as Breteillais in French.

Historical population

Year	Pop.	±% p.a.
1806	1,237	—
1826	1,296	+0.23%
1846	1,180	−0.47%
1866	1,257	+0.32%
1886	1,358	+0.39%
1906	1,236	−0.47%
1926	1,073	−0.70%
1946	1,030	−0.20%
1962	815	−1.45%

Year	Pop.	±% p.a.
1968	833	+0.36%
1975	1,685	+10.59%
1982	2,436	+5.41%
1990	2,788	+1.70%
1999	2,974	+0.72%
2007	3,332	+1.43%
2012	3,442	+0.65%
2017	3,584	+0.81%
2023	3,675	+0.42%

Source: EHESS and INSEE

== History ==
In 1120, Raoul de Montfort included the castle of Breteil in the dowry of his daughter for her wedding to the earl of La Riolaye. The parish of Breteil was created from the division of the former parish of Pleumeleuc in 1122. In this year, the bishop of Aleth consecrated the church of Breteil to Benedictine monks of Saint-Melaine de Rennes. In 1152, the Lord of Montfort-sur-Meu gave two plots of agricultural land in Breteil to the abbey of Saint-Jacques de Montfort to contribute to the monks' activities. In the town centre of Breteil, a priest named Guillaume gave a house to the abbey of Montfort-sur-Meu.
Like everywhere in Brittany, particularly Upper Brittany, small farmers had land, but they were usually small areas. Relatively few peasants were economically secure; the others, except for farmers, had to work as day labourers and servants. With 167 servants out of 1271 inhabitants in 1774, Breteil had relatively fewer servants than several neighboring towns.

The territory of the parish fell into two jurisdictions:

- Breteil and la Riollais
- la Touche Parthenay, Launay-Sinan and la Gautrais

The head tax, the "twentieth" and other taxes were collected by tax collectors who travelled throughout the parish, which was divided into four districts: town centre, the abbey, la Boulais and Painbay.

== The French Revolution ==
On 1 April 1789, inhabitants gathered to write down the register of grievances ahead of the next convention. Seventy-one voters voted for Mathurin Vitré de la Corbinais and Noël Legros to attend the next meeting of the Estates of the realm of the jurisdiction of the Sénéchal of Rennes.
In January 1791, none of the parish priests swore an oath to the Civil Constitution of the Clergy; in 1792, with the decree of 26 August and the election of François-Guy Martin as a priest, they were forced to go into exile or hiding, with the help of local farmers.
The presbytery and the lodging of a buyer of ecclesiastical goods were looted on 18 March 1793 by about 300 bandits, later called chouans (= royalists). The turmoil sparked by the mass movement of 300 men lasted several days: on 19 March, women and children sound the alarm by hitting bells with hammers, as the fighters had been arrested the day before by the national guard of Montfort-sur-Meu. Of the 22 soldiers requested to form the conscript, only 5 men volunteered. The national guard only needed to fire a few times to make the insurgents panic; a dozen Breteillais were arrested, but most were released the next day.
In 1794, the revolt of the chouans expanded. At La Herdrouais, Jean Éveillard, captain of the national guard, is assassinated on 31 December while resisting people wearing masks and looking for guns. Marie Gallais, his mother, and a half-sister suffered a similar fate on 16 December 1795.

== Tourism ==
Management of tourism in Montfort-sur-Meu is entrusted by Montfort Community to the Tourist Office of the district of Montfort.

== Buildings and other sights ==
=== Buildings ===
- Saint Malo church

The body and the southern side of the church were built during the 16th century; its framework carries an inscription from 1503. The church is noteworthy for its porch, which has a carinated archway.

- Chapel of the Abbey

This chapel, belonging to the abbey of Saint-Jacques de Montfort-sur-Meu, is built from schist and puddingstone.

- Chapel of La Riolais

This chapel seems to have been built during the 17th century, even though the sculpted pediment located at the top of the eastern door seems to date from the 15th or 16th century. Strangely, this chapel is not orientated, for its core is to the south.

=== Sights ===
- Pedestrian circuit "Le Pont Rozel"

The "Pont Rozel" pedestrian circuit can be walked all year, in any season. It starts at the church of Breteil.

== See also ==
- Communes of the Ille-et-Vilaine department
- Emmanuel Guérin Sculptor Breteil war memorial
