= Canton of Montfort-sur-Meu =

Coordinates: 48.13°N 1.96°W

- Canton
- Country: France
- Region: Brittany
- Department: Ille-et-Vilaine
- No. of communes: {{{nbcomm}}}
- Population (2023): 39,214
- INSEE code: 35 16

The canton of Montfort-sur-Meu is an administrative division of the Ille-et-Vilaine department, in northwestern France. At the French canton reorganisation which came into effect in March 2015, it was expanded from 11 to 15 communes. Its seat is in Montfort-sur-Meu.

It consists of the following communes:

1. Bédée
2. Breteil
3. Iffendic
4. Maxent
5. Monterfil
6. Montfort-sur-Meu
7. La Nouaye
8. Paimpont
9. Plélan-le-Grand
10. Pleumeleuc
11. Saint-Gonlay
12. Saint-Péran
13. Saint-Thurial
14. Talensac
15. Treffendel
