= Pleumeleuc =

Pleumeleuc Ploemenoec (Gallo) Pleveleg (Breton)
- Commune
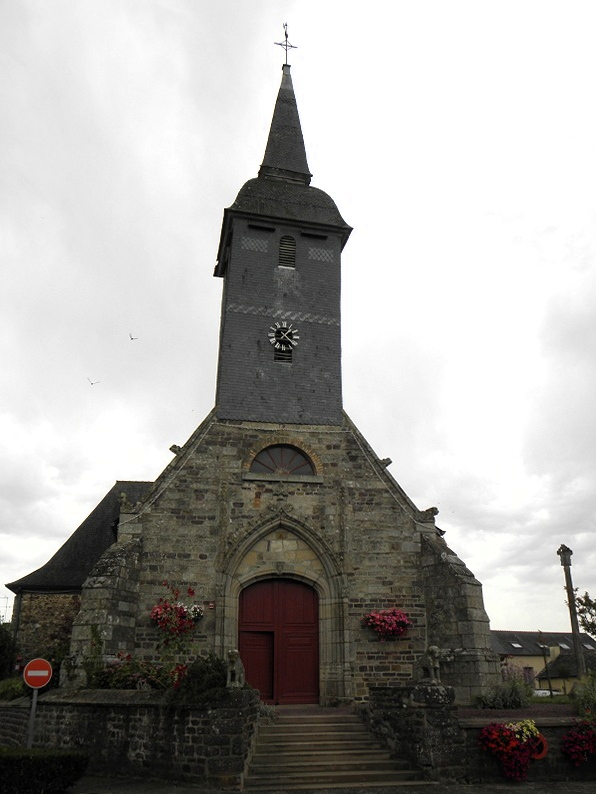
- The parish church of Saint-Pierre
- Location of Pleumeleuc
- Location within France Location within Brittany
- Coordinates: 48°11′07″N 1°55′03″W
- Country: France
- Region: Brittany
- Department: Ille-et-Vilaine
- Arrondissement: Rennes
- Canton: Montfort-sur-Meu
- Intercommunality: Montfort Communauté

Government
  - Mayor (2025–2026): Yannick Fouville
- Area^{1}: 19.51 km^{2} (7.53 sq mi)
- Highest elevation: 112 m (367 ft)
- Lowest elevation: 43 m (141 ft)
- Population (2023): 3,543
  - Density: 181.6/km^{2} (470.3/sq mi)
- Time zone: UTC+01:00 (CET)
  - Summer (DST): UTC+02:00 (CEST)
- INSEE/Postal code: 35227 /35137
- ^{1} French Land Register data, which excludes lakes, ponds, glaciers > 1 km^{2} (0.386 sq mi or 247 acres) and river estuaries.

Pleumeleuc (French pronunciation: [plœmlœk]; Breton: Pleveleg; Gallo: Ploemenoec) is a commune in the department of Ille-et-Vilaine in Brittany in the northwest of France.

== Geography ==
The town of Pleumeleuc is part of the county of Montfort-sur-Meu and of the town of Rennes.
It stretches over 19,51 km2 and had 2.824 inhabitants in 2009. It is surrounded by Montfort-sur-Meu, Bédée, La Nouaye, Breteil, Iffendic, Talensac, Saint-Gonlay. La Vaunoise river goes through the town and many pedestrian paths follow the banks.

== Histoire ==
Pleumeleuc was a former early parish which included the towns of Bédée, Breteil, Clayes, Le Lou-du-Lac and La Nouaye.
During the 11th century, the parish of Pleumeleuc was given to the benedictin monks of Saint-Melaine abbey.
In 1218, Raoul, bishop of Saint-Malo, made it know that the abbot of Saint-Melaine had introduced him to the clierc Pierre de Tinténiac to be in charge of the church of Pleumeleuc. Pierre de Tinténiac, reserving all the rights on the taxes of the parish for himself, the bishop said that he had entrusted him the souls and had left him the place in the church.
During the 17th century, the two priories of Bédée and Hédé shared the charges of Pleumeleuc. But, during the 18th century, as the priest had to be paid, the monks of Saint-Melaine only asked for 2/3 of the tithe of Pleumeleuc and left all that was left to the priest for his own money bag.

== Population ==
Inhabitants of Pleumeleuc are called Pleumeuleucois in French.

Historical population
Year	Pop.	±% p.a.
1968	946	—
1975	1,110	+2.31%
1982	1,548	+4.87%
1990	1,929	+2.79%
1999	2,128	+1.10%
2007	2,567	+2.37%
2012	3,077	+3.69%
2017	3,329	+1.59%
2023	3,543	+1.04%
Source: INSEE

== Tourism ==
Tourism management in Montfort-sur-Meu" is entrusted by Montfort Community to the Tourist Office of the district of Montfort.

== Sights ==
=== Buildings ===
The church Saint-Pierre The early church is probably dated from the 11th century, when the Benedictine monks of Saint-Melaine arrived to the parish.
We can still see nowadays on the wall of the nave of the church a cut in the shape of a fishbone which would probably date from this period.
The building had to be restored so most of the walls are dated from the 15th century. At first, the church was the Lord of Montfort-sur-Meu's because he had superiority and foundation rights on it.
However, in 1630, the Duke of Trémoille sold the church and so the rights on the monument to François Glé, Lord of La Besneraye. That's why we can see on the stained glass windows the flash of the Lords of La Besneraye. The chapels of the western side have been added during the 16th century.

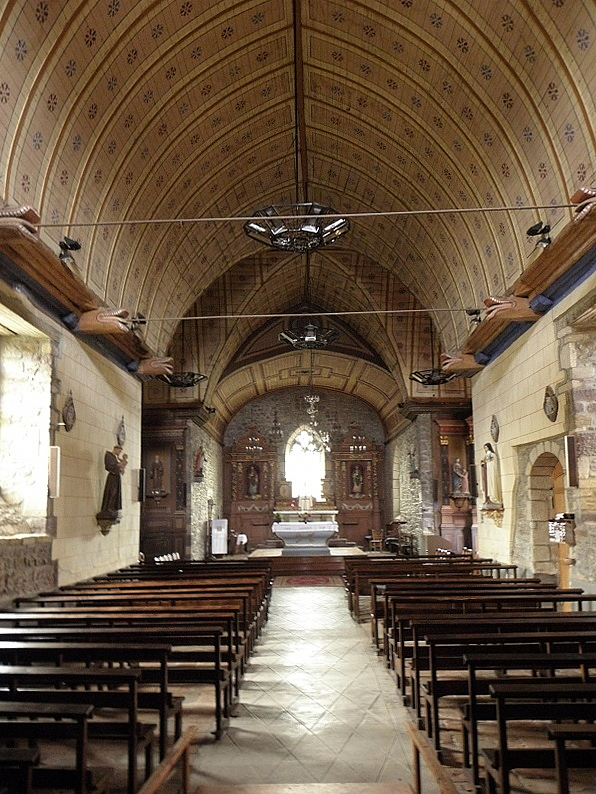
The interior of the church of Saint-Pierre

=== Touristic places ===
Valley of the Vaunoise river The Vaunoise river, 32 km long, crosses the North East of the district and is a nice steep-sided valley. Several marked paths follow the banks.
Circuit de Vaunoise-La Motte The circuit starts next to the church of Pleumeleuc. It lasts 1h45 and is about 7 km long. The circuit follows the Vaunoise river for some time and goes through the countryside of Pleumeleuc.
Circuit de Vaunoise-La Monneraye The start is also next to the church, near the roundabout of the town hall. It lasts 1h15 and is 5 km long. The circuit follows most of the time the Vaunoise river.

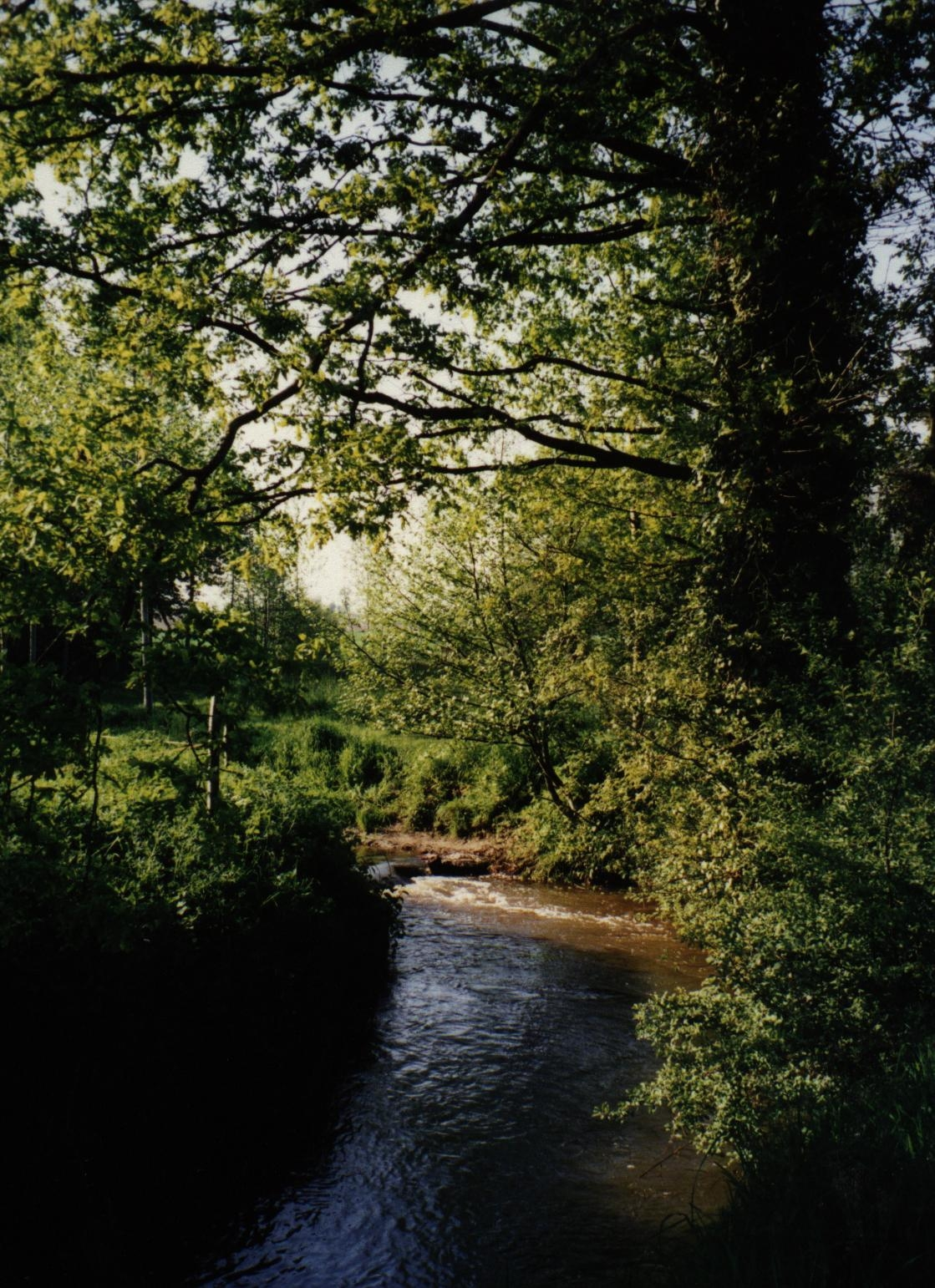
The vaunoise river

== See also ==
- Communes of the Ille-et-Vilaine department
