= Montfort Communauté =

Federation of municipalities in France

- Communauté de communes
- Interactive map of Montfort Communauté
- Coordinates: 48°08′N 1°57′W
- Country: France
- Region: Brittany
- Department: Ille-et-Vilaine
- No. of communes: {{{nbcomm}}}
- Established: 1992
- Area: 194.4 km^{2} (75.1 sq mi)
- Population (2018): 25,830
  - Density: 132.9/km^{2} (344.1/sq mi)
- Website: www.montfortcommunaute.bzh

Montfort Communauté (full name: Communauté de communes Montfort Communauté, formerly Communauté de Communes du Pays de Montfort) is an intermunicipal structure in the department of Ille-et-Vilaine, in Brittany, France. It was established on 14 December 1992. Its seat is Montfort-sur-Meu. Its area is 194.4 km^{2}, and its population was 25,830 in 2018. It borders Rennes Métropole to the east, CC de Saint-Méen Montauban to the northwest and CC de Brocéliande to the south.

== Composition ==
The communauté de communes consists of the following 8 communes:

1. Bédée
2. Breteil
3. Iffendic
4. Montfort-sur-Meu
5. La Nouaye
6. Pleumeleuc
7. Saint-Gonlay
8. Talensac

== Competences ==
=== Tourism ===
- Since 2006, the 8 towns' competence in tourism have been transferred to Montfort Community. Montfort Community took the decision to create an intermunicipal Tourist Office. This last officially exists since 14 December 2006 and opened in spring 2007. It is created as an intermunicipal government control and works with an operating board of 23 members.
- A first touristic outline for 2007–2010 has been done by the Tourist Office. The second outline of the touristic development in the district of Montfort en Brocéliande, which covers the 2011–2014 period, has been validated by the community council of Montfort Community on 16 December 2010.
