= Monterfil =

Monterfil Mósterfiu (Gallo) Mousterfil (Breton)
- Commune
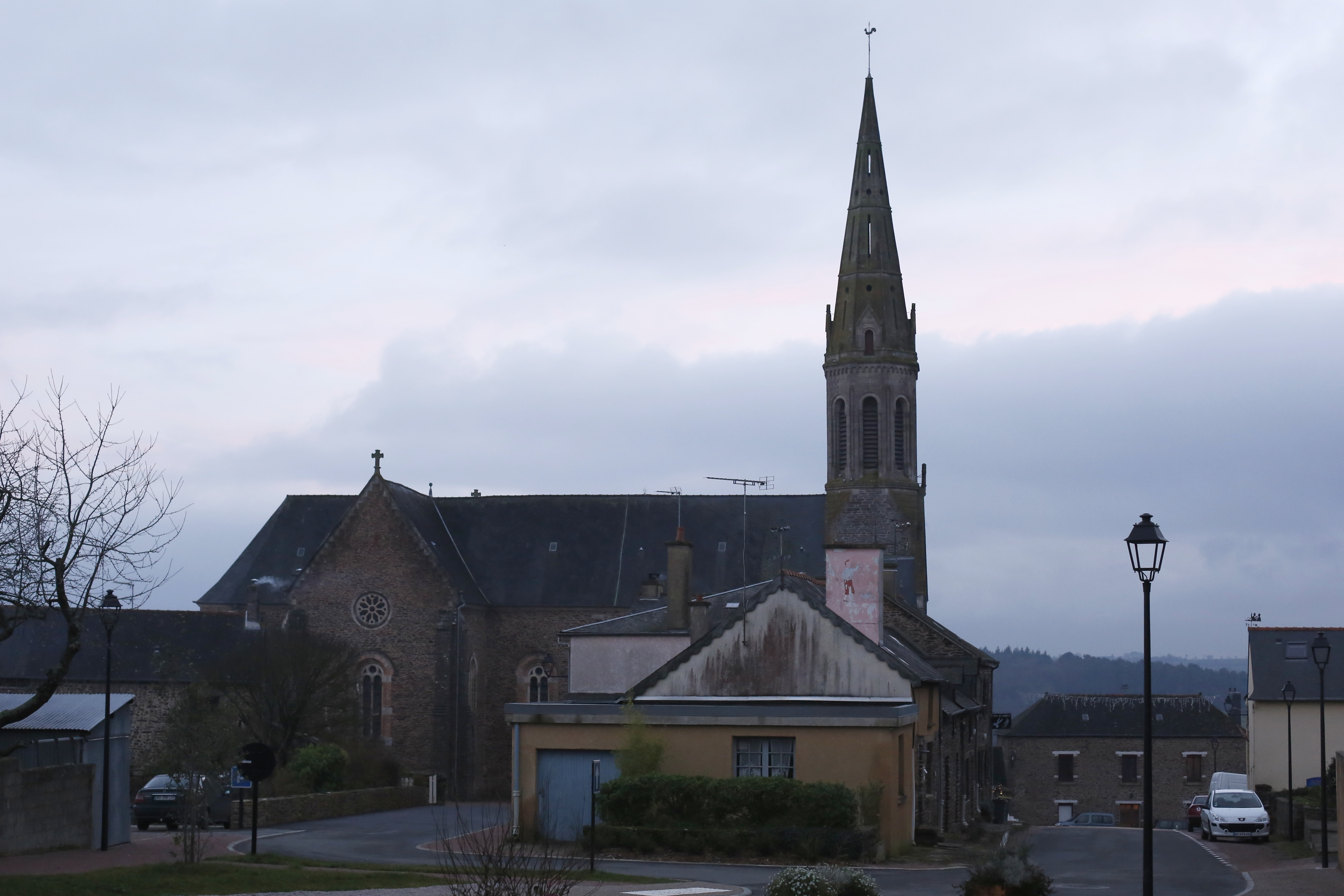
- The church of Saint-Étienne

- Coat of arms
- Location of Monterfil
- Location within France Location within Brittany
- Coordinates: 48°04′00″N 1°58′39″W
- Country: France
- Region: Brittany
- Department: Ille-et-Vilaine
- Arrondissement: Rennes
- Canton: Montfort-sur-Meu
- Intercommunality: Brocéliande

Government
  - Mayor (2020–2026): Michel Duault
- Area^{1}: 16.94 km^{2} (6.54 sq mi)
- Highest elevation: 132 m (433 ft)
- Lowest elevation: 32 m (105 ft)
- Population (2023): 1,366
  - Density: 80.64/km^{2} (208.9/sq mi)
- Time zone: UTC+01:00 (CET)
  - Summer (DST): UTC+02:00 (CEST)
- INSEE/Postal code: 35187 /35160
- ^{1} French Land Register data, which excludes lakes, ponds, glaciers > 1 km^{2} (0.386 sq mi or 247 acres) and river estuaries.

Monterfil (French pronunciation: [mɔ̃tɛʁfil]; Breton: Mousterfil; Gallo: Mósterfiu) is a commune in the Ille-et-Vilaine department of Brittany in northwestern France.

== Population ==
Historical population
Year	Pop.	±% p.a.
1968	594	—
1975	720	+2.79%
1982	868	+2.71%
1990	915	+0.66%
1999	978	+0.74%
2007	1,175	+2.32%
2012	1,322	+2.39%
2017	1,327	+0.08%
2023	1,366	+0.48%
Source: INSEE

== See also ==
- Communes of the Ille-et-Vilaine department
