= Canton of Saint-Méen-le-Grand =

Coordinates: 48°09′32″N 2°08′48″W

Saint-Méen-le-Grand
- Former canton
- Interactive map of Saint-Méen-le-Grand
- Country: France
- Region: Brittany
- Department: Ille-et-Vilaine
- No. of communes: {{{nbcomm}}}
- Disbanded: 2015
- Area: 185 km^{2} (71 sq mi)
- Population (2012): 11,135
  - Density: 60.2/km^{2} (156/sq mi)

The Canton of Saint-Méen-le-Grand is a former canton of France, in the Ille-et-Vilaine département, located southwest of Rennes. It had 11,135 inhabitants (2012). It was disbanded following the French canton reorganisation which came into effect in March 2015. It consisted of 9 communes, which joined the canton of Montauban-de-Bretagne in 2015. It is located between Rennes and Brest.

The canton comprised the following communes:

- Bléruais
- Le Crouais
- Gaël
- Muel
- Quédillac
- Saint-Malon-sur-Mel
- Saint-Maugan
- Saint-Méen-le-Grand
- Saint-Onen-la-Chapelle
