= La Chapelle-du-Lou =

Commune in Ille-et-Vilaine, France

La Chapelle-du-Lou Chapel-al-Loc'h
- Part of La Chapelle-du-Lou-du-Lac
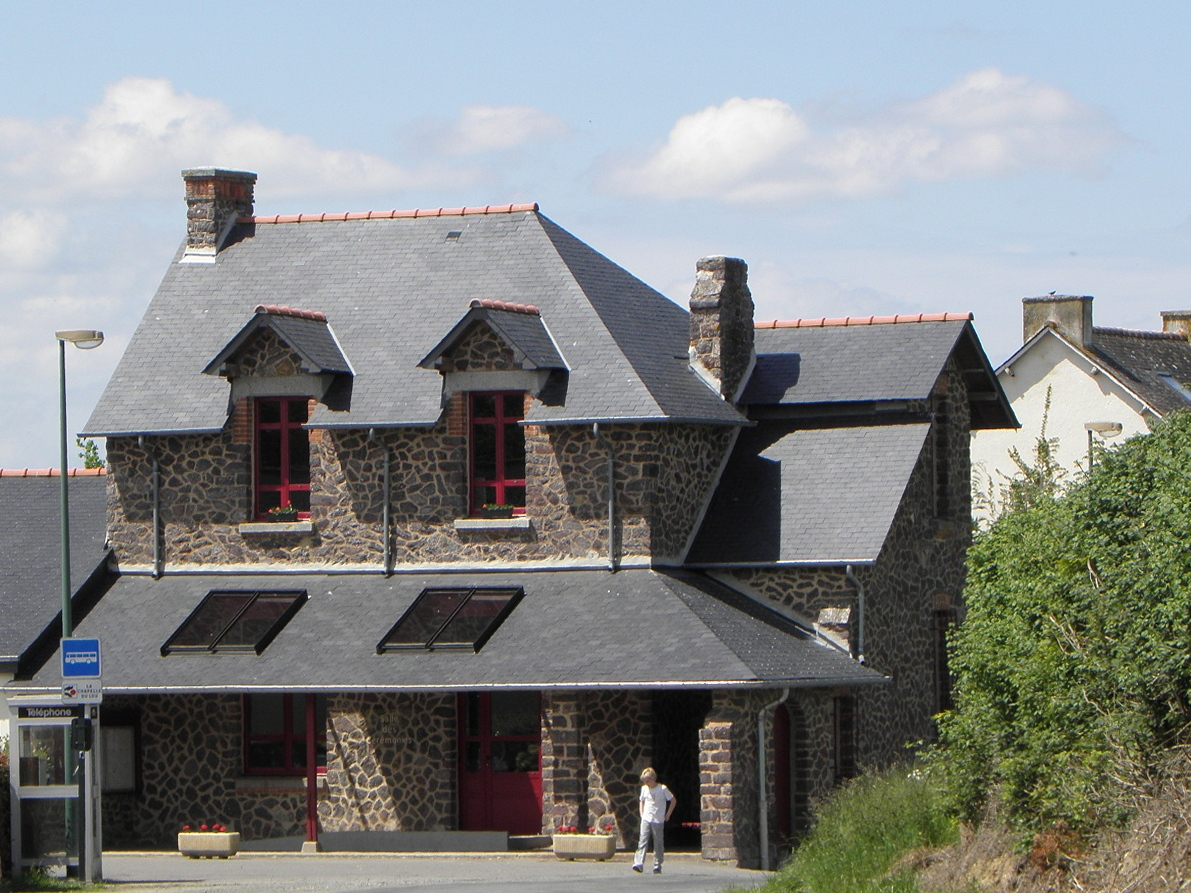
- Town hall

- Coat of arms
- Location of La Chapelle-du-Lou
- Location within France Location within Brittany
- Coordinates: 48°12′48″N 1°59′27″W
- Country: France
- Region: Brittany
- Department: Ille-et-Vilaine
- Arrondissement: Rennes
- Canton: Montauban-de-Bretagne
- Commune: La Chapelle-du-Lou-du-Lac
- Area^{1}: 7.28 km^{2} (2.81 sq mi)
- Highest elevation: 114 m (374 ft)
- Lowest elevation: 74 m (243 ft)
- Population (2018): 908
  - Density: 125/km^{2} (323/sq mi)
- Time zone: UTC+01:00 (CET)
  - Summer (DST): UTC+02:00 (CEST)
- Postal code: 35360
- ^{1} French Land Register data, which excludes lakes, ponds, glaciers > 1 km^{2} (0.386 sq mi or 247 acres) and river estuaries.

La Chapelle-du-Lou (French pronunciation: [la ʃapɛl dy lu]; Breton: Chapel-al-Loc'h; Gallo: La Chapèll-du-Lóc) is a former commune in the Ille-et-Vilaine department of Brittany in northwestern France. On 1 January 2016, it was merged into the new commune La Chapelle-du-Lou-du-Lac.

== Population ==
People from La Chapelle-du-Lou are called in French Chapellois.

Historical population
Year	Pop.	±% p.a.
1962	303	—
1968	277	−1.48%
1975	254	−1.23%
1982	298	+2.31%
1990	384	+3.22%
1999	376	−0.23%
2018	908	+4.75%
Source: EHESS and INSEE

== Notable people ==
- René-Jean de Botherel du Plessis (1745–1805), counter-revolutionary

== See also ==
- Communes of the Ille-et-Vilaine department
