= Gaël =

Gaël Gaèu (Gallo) Gwazel (Breton)
- Commune
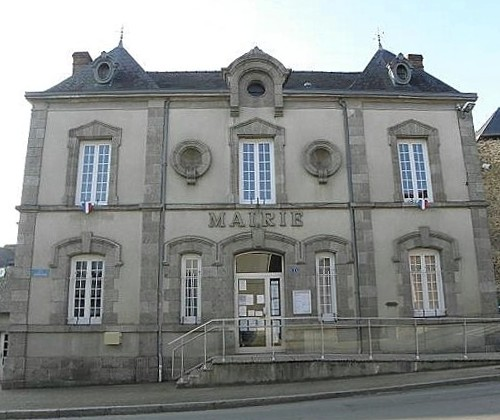
- Town hall

- Coat of arms
- Location of Gaël
- Location within France Location within Brittany
- Coordinates: 48°07′59″N 2°13′12″W
- Country: France
- Region: Brittany
- Department: Ille-et-Vilaine
- Arrondissement: Rennes
- Canton: Montauban-de-Bretagne
- Intercommunality: Saint-Méen Montauban

Government
  - Mayor (2020–2026): Denis Levrel
- Area^{1}: 52.1 km^{2} (20.1 sq mi)
- Elevation: 80 m (260 ft)
- Highest elevation: 131 m (430 ft)
- Lowest elevation: 51 m (167 ft)
- Population (2023): 1,613
  - Density: 31.0/km^{2} (80.2/sq mi)
- Time zone: UTC+01:00 (CET)
  - Summer (DST): UTC+02:00 (CEST)
- INSEE/Postal code: 35117 /35290
- ^{1} French Land Register data, which excludes lakes, ponds, glaciers > 1 km^{2} (0.386 sq mi or 247 acres) and river estuaries.

Gaël (Gallo: Gaèu, Breton: Gwazel) is a commune in the Ille-et-Vilaine department in Brittany in northwestern France.

It lies southwest of Rennes between Saint-Méen-le-Grand and Mauron. In the 18th century, a fair was held twice a year in August and October.

== Toponymy ==
Old versions of the place-name include Guadel in 799, Wadel in 816, Vadel in 851, Wael in 1096, Gael as soon as 1112.

Its Breton name is Gwazel, that comes directly from Wadel > Gwadel > Gwazel, in Breton intervocalic [d] becomes [z], like in mezo ″drunk″, Welsh meddw ″drunk″. In French intervocalic [d] disappears totally : Wadel > Wael (Latin cadena > French chaine > English chain) and initial Germanic w- became gu- [gʷ] (+ -a) before becoming simply [g] : Guadel > Gael (cf. Old French guarder > French garder, English guard). The symbol ë means in Modern French that the preceding a has to be pronounced : Ga-el [gaɛl] (not [gɛʲl])

Nevertherless the place-name is not from Breton but from Gallo-Romance Wadellu(m), derived of Old Low Franconian *wad ″ford″ > French gué ″ford″ (Old Norman wei > Norman vey, Picard, Walloon wez). There were always Gallo-Romance speaking communities east of Saint-Brieuc and the Breton languages disappears totally around Gaël in the Middle Ages to be replaced by Gallo.

A main ford allowed to cross the Meu stream.

== History ==
It is best known to English historians as being the ancestral seat of Ralph de Guader the first earl of Norfolk and Suffolk in post-Conquest England circa 1070 A.D.

This is an ancient Breton parish to the west of Rennes, whose boundaries formerly stretched to include the territories of Bran, Muel, Saint-Onen, Crouais, Saint-Méen-le-Grand, Concoret and Loscouët-sur-Meu. The parish of Gaël (Guadel) was a dependency of the Archbishopric of Saint-Malo. In the 6th and 7th centuries, Gaël was a major town in the kingdom of Domnonia.

The name is alleged to derive from the word for a ford, river-crossing or river (see Guad- and Guadal-). In local myths there was a 6th-century king Hoël (possible link to King Coel) known as the forest king or "Rex Arboretanus". It is a fact that the town is situated amidst the vast forests of Poutrecouët. A royal castle from this era was sited at Meu, not far from Gaël. This later became the seat of the De Montfort family. The emplacement was captured and dismantled by De Guesclin in 1372.

During World War II, the German Luftwaffe occupied an airfield near Gaël in 1941. The Allied Air Forces based in England attacked the airfield on several occasions in 1943 and 1944 before it was seized by the United States Army in June 1944. Known as Advanced Landing Ground "A-31", the 354th Fighter Group based P-51 Mustang fighters at the airfield from 13 August through 17 September 1944 before moving east to Orconte in the Marne département along with the advancing Allied armies.

After the war, the airfield was dismantled and the land returned to agricultural use.

== Geography ==
The village lies on the left bank of the Meu, which flows southeastward through the commune.

== Population ==
Inhabitants of Gaël are called Gaëlites in French.

Historical population
Year	Pop.	±% p.a.
1968	1,673	—
1975	1,515	−1.41%
1982	1,484	−0.29%
1990	1,406	−0.67%
1999	1,351	−0.44%
2007	1,541	+1.66%
2012	1,619	+0.99%
2017	1,634	+0.18%
2023	1,613	−0.22%
Source: INSEE

== See also ==
- Communes of the Ille-et-Vilaine department
