= Le Lou-du-Lac =

Le Lou-du-Lac Al Loc'h
- Part of La Chapelle-du-Lou-du-Lac
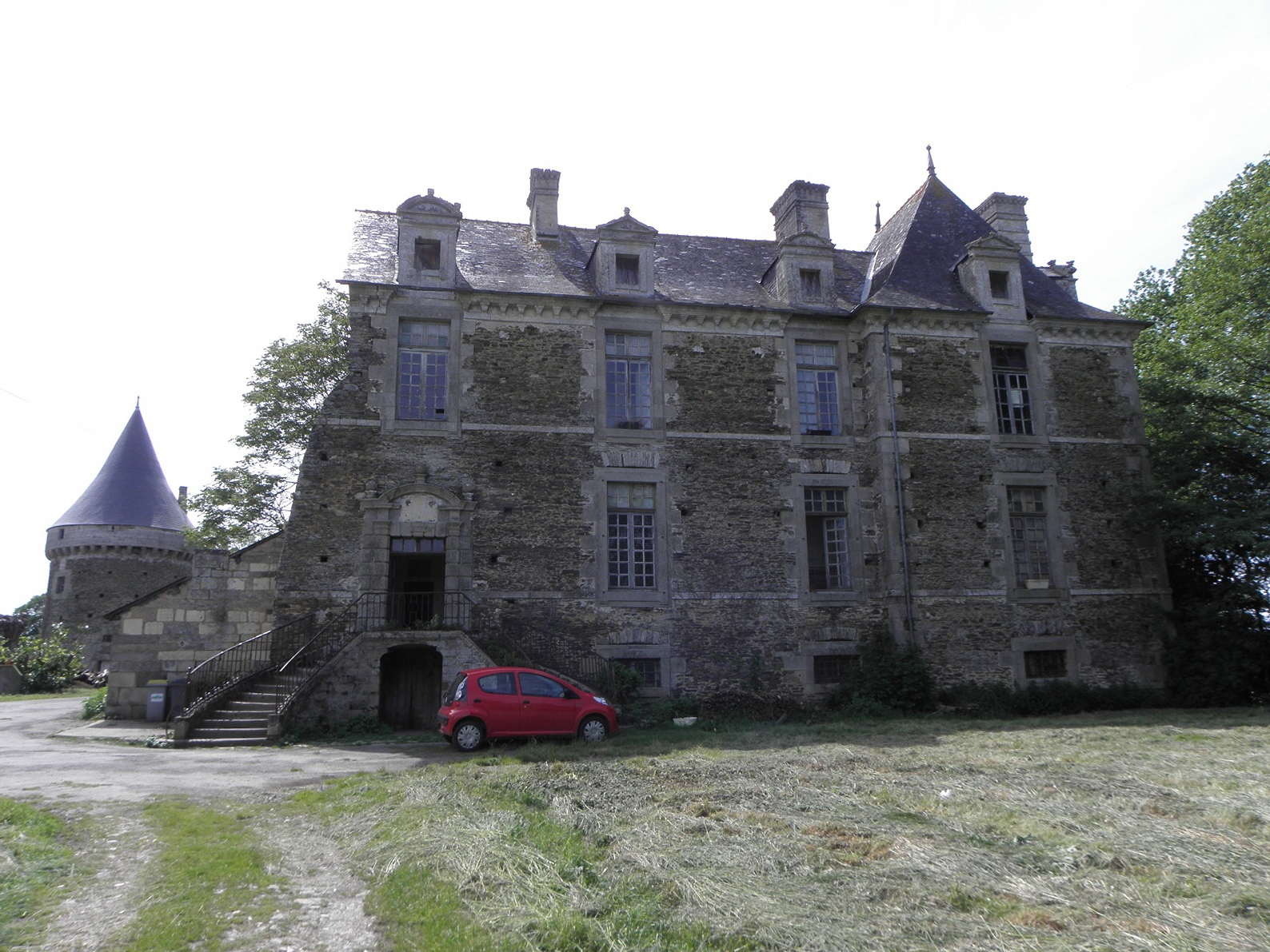
- The Château of Lou-du-Lac
- Location of Le Lou-du-Lac
- Location within France Location within Brittany
- Coordinates: 48°12′36″N 1°59′30″W
- Country: France
- Region: Brittany
- Department: Ille-et-Vilaine
- Arrondissement: Rennes
- Canton: Montauban-de-Bretagne
- Commune: La Chapelle-du-Lou-du-Lac
- Area^{1}: 3.18 km^{2} (1.23 sq mi)
- Highest elevation: 101 m (331 ft)
- Lowest elevation: 63 m (207 ft)
- Population (2018): 97
  - Density: 31/km^{2} (79/sq mi)
- Time zone: UTC+01:00 (CET)
  - Summer (DST): UTC+02:00 (CEST)
- Postal code: 35360
- ^{1} French Land Register data, which excludes lakes, ponds, glaciers > 1 km^{2} (0.386 sq mi or 247 acres) and river estuaries.

Le Lou-du-Lac (French pronunciation: [lə lu dy lak]; Breton: Al Loc'h; Gallo: Le Lóc) is a former commune in the Ille-et-Vilaine department in Brittany in northwestern France. On 1 January 2016, it was merged into the new commune La Chapelle-du-Lou-du-Lac.

== See also ==
- Communes of the Ille-et-Vilaine department
