= Botherel =

Botherel is a surname. Notable people with the surname include:

- Jacques Botherel (born 1946), French racing cyclist
- René-Jean de Botherel du Plessis (1745–1805), French counter-revolutionary
