= Miniac-sous-Bécherel =

Miniac-sous-Bécherel Meinyac (Gallo) Minieg-Begerel (Breton)
- Commune
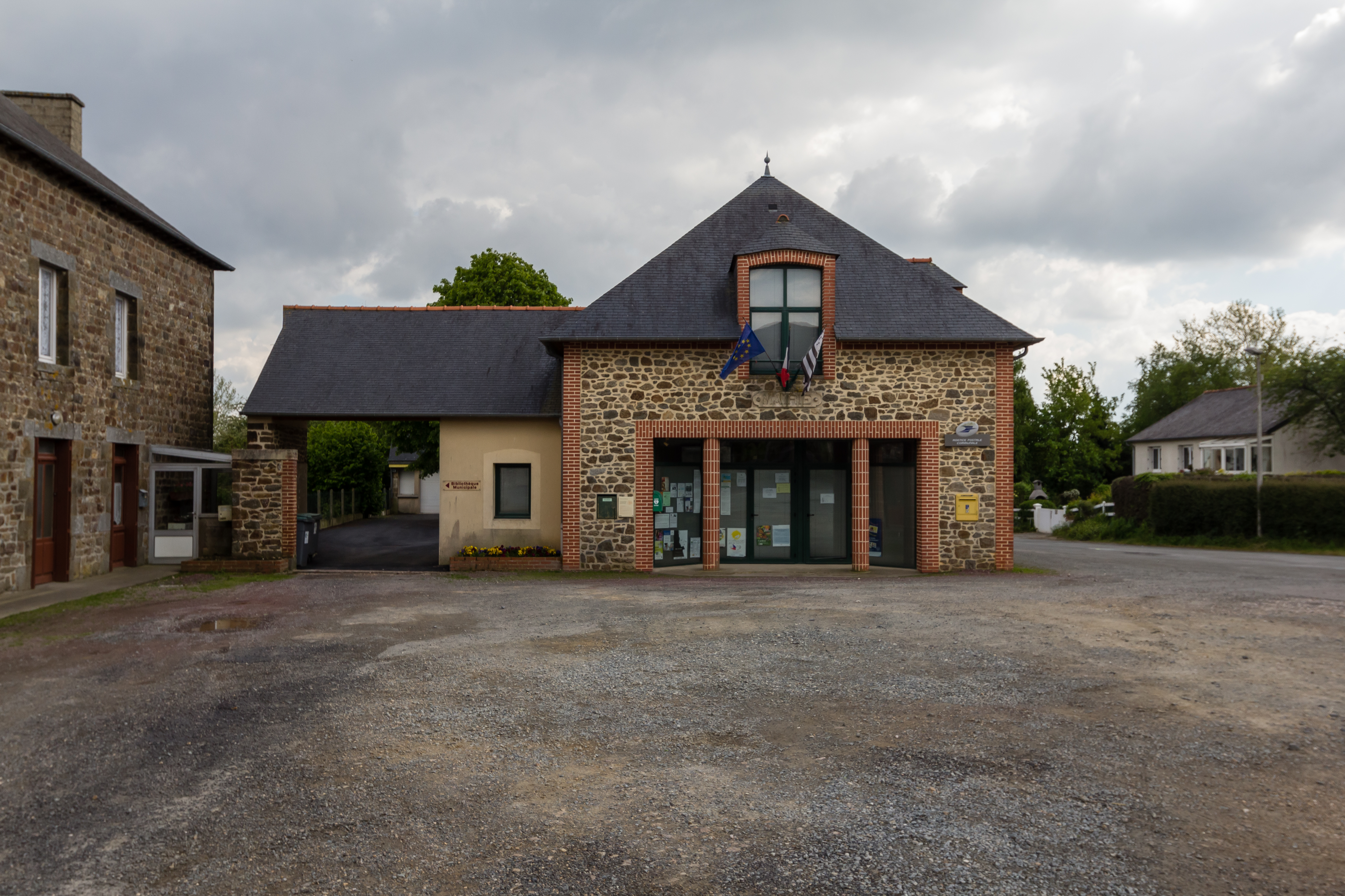
- The town hall of Miniac-sous-Bécherel
- Location of Miniac-sous-Bécherel
- Location within France Location within Brittany
- Coordinates: 48°17′10″N 1°55′51″W
- Country: France
- Region: Brittany
- Department: Ille-et-Vilaine
- Arrondissement: Rennes
- Canton: Montauban-de-Bretagne
- Intercommunality: Rennes Métropole

Government
  - Mayor (2024–2026): Carole Leromain
- Area^{1}: 13.55 km^{2} (5.23 sq mi)
- Highest elevation: 183 m (600 ft)
- Lowest elevation: 79 m (259 ft)
- Population (2023): 776
  - Density: 57.3/km^{2} (148/sq mi)
- Time zone: UTC+01:00 (CET)
  - Summer (DST): UTC+02:00 (CEST)
- INSEE/Postal code: 35180 /35190
- ^{1} French Land Register data, which excludes lakes, ponds, glaciers > 1 km^{2} (0.386 sq mi or 247 acres) and river estuaries.

Miniac-sous-Bécherel (French pronunciation: [minjak su bɛʃʁɛl], literally Miniac under Bécherel; Breton: Minieg-Begerel; Gallo: Meinyac) is a commune in the Ille-et-Vilaine department in Brittany in northwestern France.

== Population ==
Inhabitants of Miniac-sous-Bécherel are called Miniaçois in French.

Historical population
Year	Pop.	±% p.a.
1968	612	—
1975	587	−0.59%
1982	527	−1.53%
1990	516	−0.26%
1999	560	+0.91%
2007	661	+2.09%
2012	732	+2.06%
2017	774	+1.12%
2023	776	+0.04%
Source: INSEE

== See also ==
- Communes of the Ille-et-Vilaine department
