= Landujan =

Landujan Landujan
- Commune
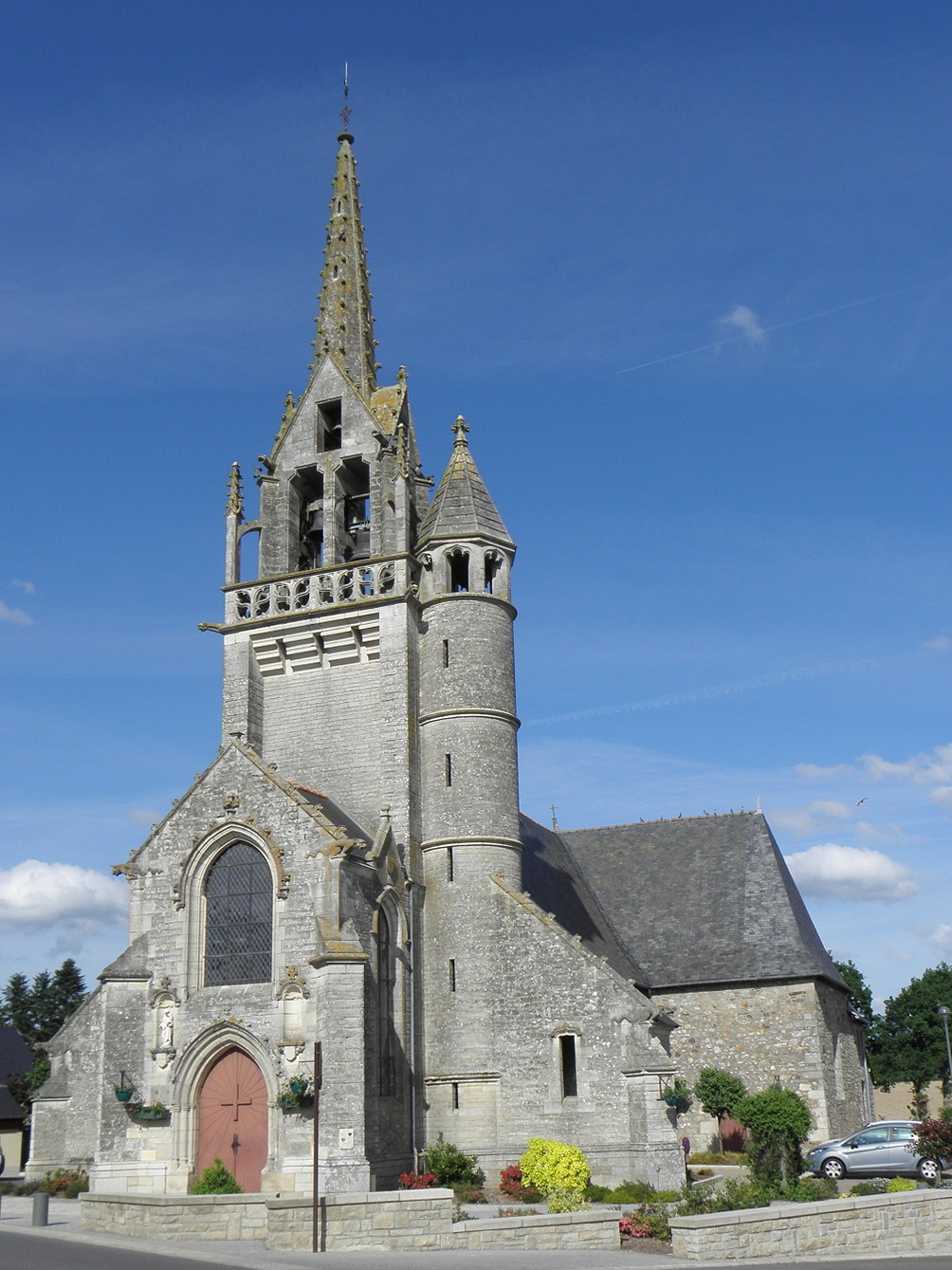
- The parish church of Saint-Tudin

- Coat of arms
- Location of Landujan
- Location within France Location within Brittany
- Coordinates: 48°15′03″N 1°59′42″W
- Country: France
- Region: Brittany
- Department: Ille-et-Vilaine
- Arrondissement: Rennes
- Canton: Montauban-de-Bretagne
- Intercommunality: Saint-Méen Montauban

Government
  - Mayor (2020–2026): Serge Henry
- Area^{1}: 14.32 km^{2} (5.53 sq mi)
- Highest elevation: 118 m (387 ft)
- Lowest elevation: 62 m (203 ft)
- Population (2023): 941
  - Density: 65.7/km^{2} (170/sq mi)
- Time zone: UTC+01:00 (CET)
  - Summer (DST): UTC+02:00 (CEST)
- INSEE/Postal code: 35143 /35360
- ^{1} French Land Register data, which excludes lakes, ponds, glaciers > 1 km^{2} (0.386 sq mi or 247 acres) and river estuaries.

Landujan (French pronunciation: [lɑ̃dyʒɑ̃]; Breton: Landujan; Gallo: Landujan) is a commune in the Ille-et-Vilaine department in Brittany in northwestern France.

== Population ==
Inhabitants of Landujan are called Landujannais in French.

Historical population
Year	Pop.	±% p.a.
1968	680	—
1975	618	−1.36%
1982	589	−0.68%
1990	640	+1.04%
1999	683	+0.73%
2007	877	+3.17%
2012	959	+1.80%
2017	934	−0.53%
2023	941	+0.12%
Source: INSEE

== See also ==
- Communes of the Ille-et-Vilaine department
