= Gael Airfield =

Gael Airfield Advanced Landing Ground (ALG) A-31

- Brittany Region, France Gael Airfield (France)

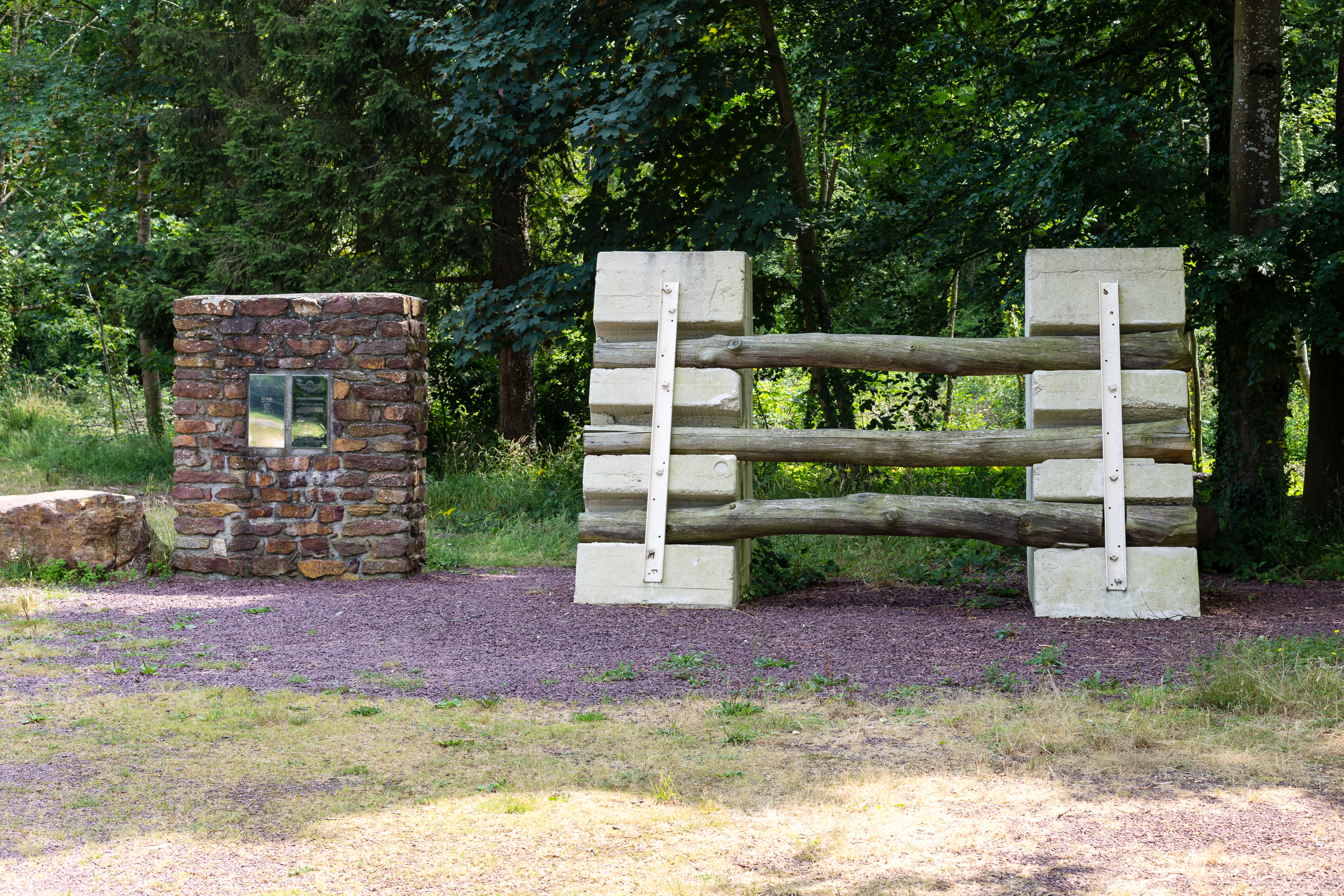
- Memorial at the location of the former airfield.

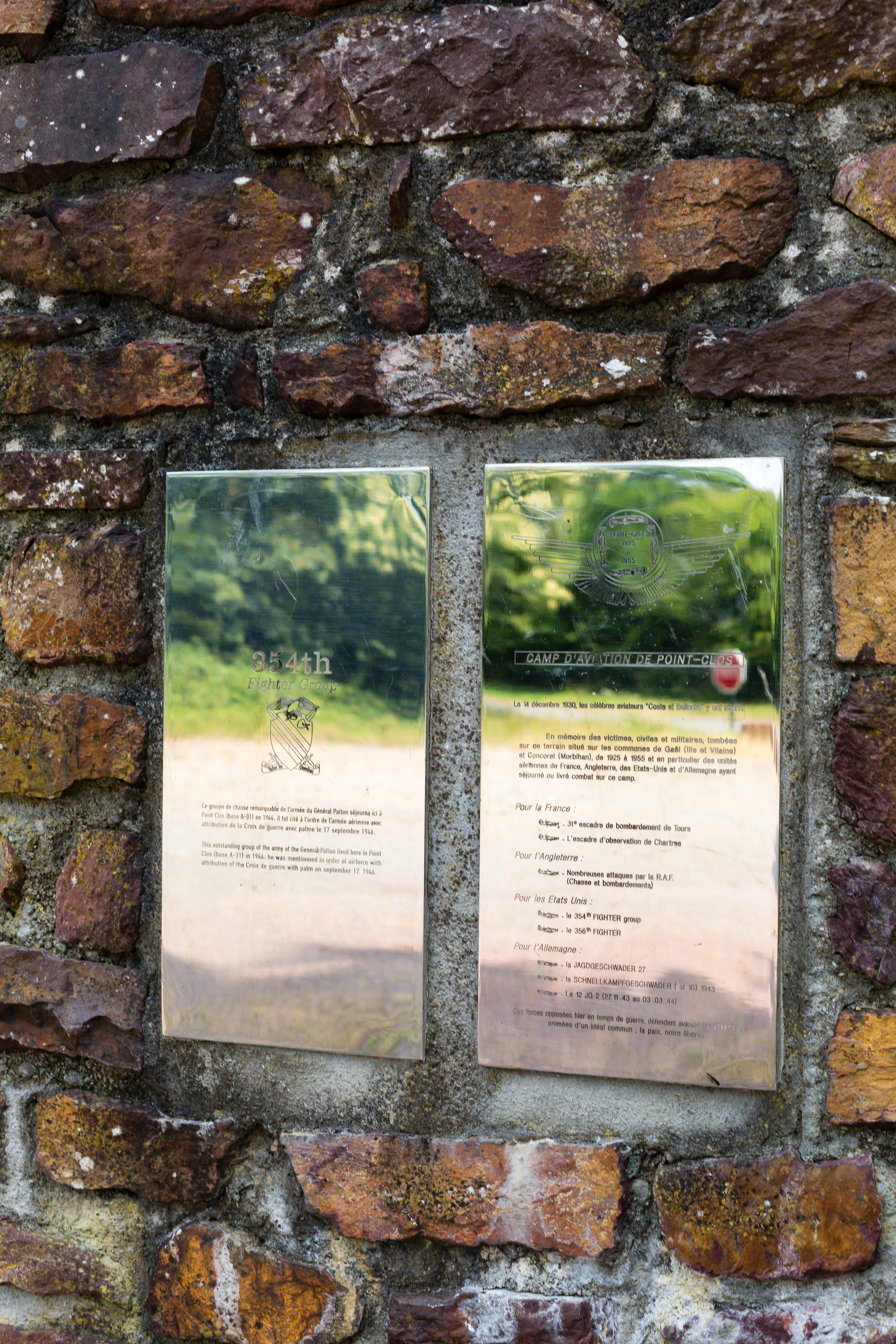
- Plaques dedicated to the 354th Fighter Group and to Dieudonné Costes, Maurice Bellonte, war victims and other french, english, american and german air groups.

Site information
- Type: Military airfield
- Controlled by: United States Army Air Forces

Location
- Coordinates: 48°04′52″N 002°11′46″W

Site history
- Built by: IX Engineering Command
- In use: August–September 1944
- Materials: Sod/Compressed Earth
- Battles/wars: Western Front (World War II); Northern France Campaign

Gael Airfield is an abandoned World War II military airfield, which is located near the commune of Gaël in the Brittany region of northern France.

== History ==
The airfield was originally built by the French Air Force in the 1930s. It was used by the French in the 1940 Battle of France by the following units;

- 31st Bombardment Wing Tours
- Wing of Observation of Chartres

After the Fall of France, the following German Luftwaffe units used the base:

- Jagdgeschwader 27
- Schnellkampfgeschwader 1943 JG 12

As part of the D-Day landings in Normandy, the United States Army Air Force VIII Bomber Command 92d Bombardment Group attacked the airfield with twelve B-17 Flying Fortress bombers on 15 June 1944 (Mission 414) as part of a general bombardment of German airfields in the area. The Gaël area was liberated by Allied Ground Forces around 10 August 1944, and the airfield was repaired by the IX Engineering Command, 850th Engineer Aviation Battalion.

Known as Advanced Landing Ground "A-31", the airfield consisted of a single 4500' (1363m) Sod/Compressed Earth runway aligned 08/26. In addition, tents were used for billeting and also for support facilities; an access road was built to the existing road infrastructure; a dump for supplies, ammunition, and gasoline drums, along with a drinkable water and minimal electrical grid for communications and station lighting.

The 354th Fighter Group, based P-51 Mustang fighters at Gael from 13 August though 15 September 1944.

The fighter planes flew support missions during the Allied invasion of Normandy, patrolling roads in front of the beachhead; strafing German military vehicles and dropping bombs on gun emplacements, anti-aircraft artillery and concentrations of German troops in Normandy and Brittany when spotted.

After the Americans moved east into Central France with the advancing Allied Armies, the airfield was closed on 28 September 1944. Today the long dismantled airfield is indistinguishable from the agricultural fields in the area.

A plaque is dedicated to the 354th Fighter Group who stayed on A base-31 in 1944.
