= Irodouër =

Irodouër Irodoèrr (Gallo) Irodouer (Breton)
- Commune
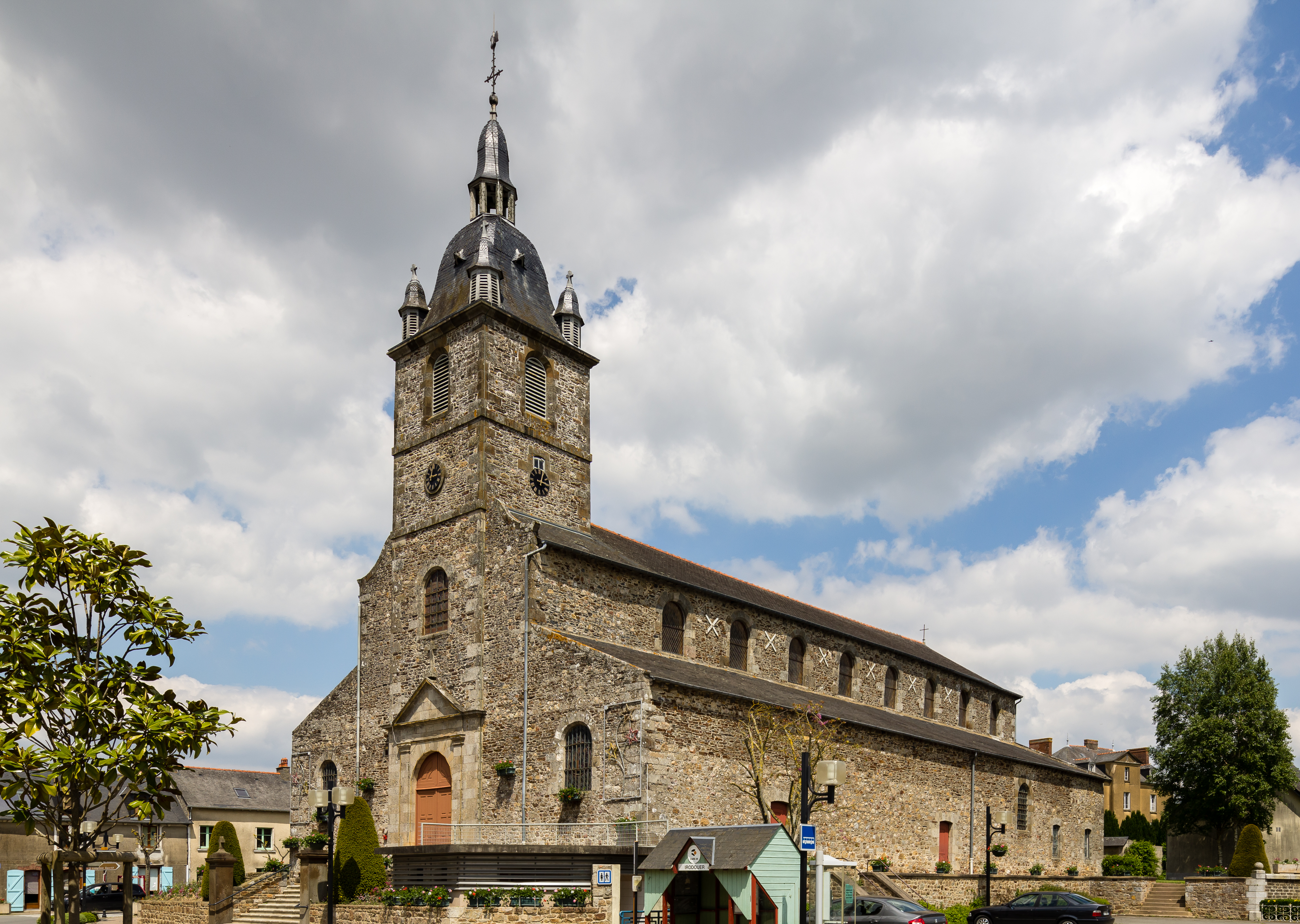
- The church of Saint-Pierre

- Coat of arms
- Location of Irodouër
- Location within France Location within Brittany
- Coordinates: 48°15′02″N 1°56′58″W
- Country: France
- Region: Brittany
- Department: Ille-et-Vilaine
- Arrondissement: Rennes
- Canton: Montauban-de-Bretagne
- Intercommunality: Saint-Méen Montauban

Government
  - Mayor (2020–2026): Mickaël Le Bouquin
- Area^{1}: 23.54 km^{2} (9.09 sq mi)
- Highest elevation: 144 m (472 ft)
- Lowest elevation: 78 m (256 ft)
- Population (2023): 2,300
  - Density: 98/km^{2} (250/sq mi)
- Time zone: UTC+01:00 (CET)
  - Summer (DST): UTC+02:00 (CEST)
- INSEE/Postal code: 35135 /35850
- ^{1} French Land Register data, which excludes lakes, ponds, glaciers > 1 km^{2} (0.386 sq mi or 247 acres) and river estuaries.

Irodouër (Breton: Irodouer, Gallo: Irodoèrr) is a commune in the Ille-et-Vilaine department in Brittany in northwestern France.

== Population ==
Inhabitants of Irodouër are called Irodouëriens in French.

Historical population
Year	Pop.	±% p.a.
1968	1,236	—
1975	1,258	+0.25%
1982	1,211	−0.54%
1990	1,286	+0.75%
1999	1,384	+0.82%
2007	1,890	+3.97%
2012	2,137	+2.49%
2017	2,262	+1.14%
2023	2,300	+0.28%
Source: INSEE

== See also ==
- Communes of the Ille-et-Vilaine department
