= La Chapelle-du-Lou-du-Lac =

La Chapelle-du-Lou-du-Lac Chapel-al-Loc'h (Breton)
- Commune
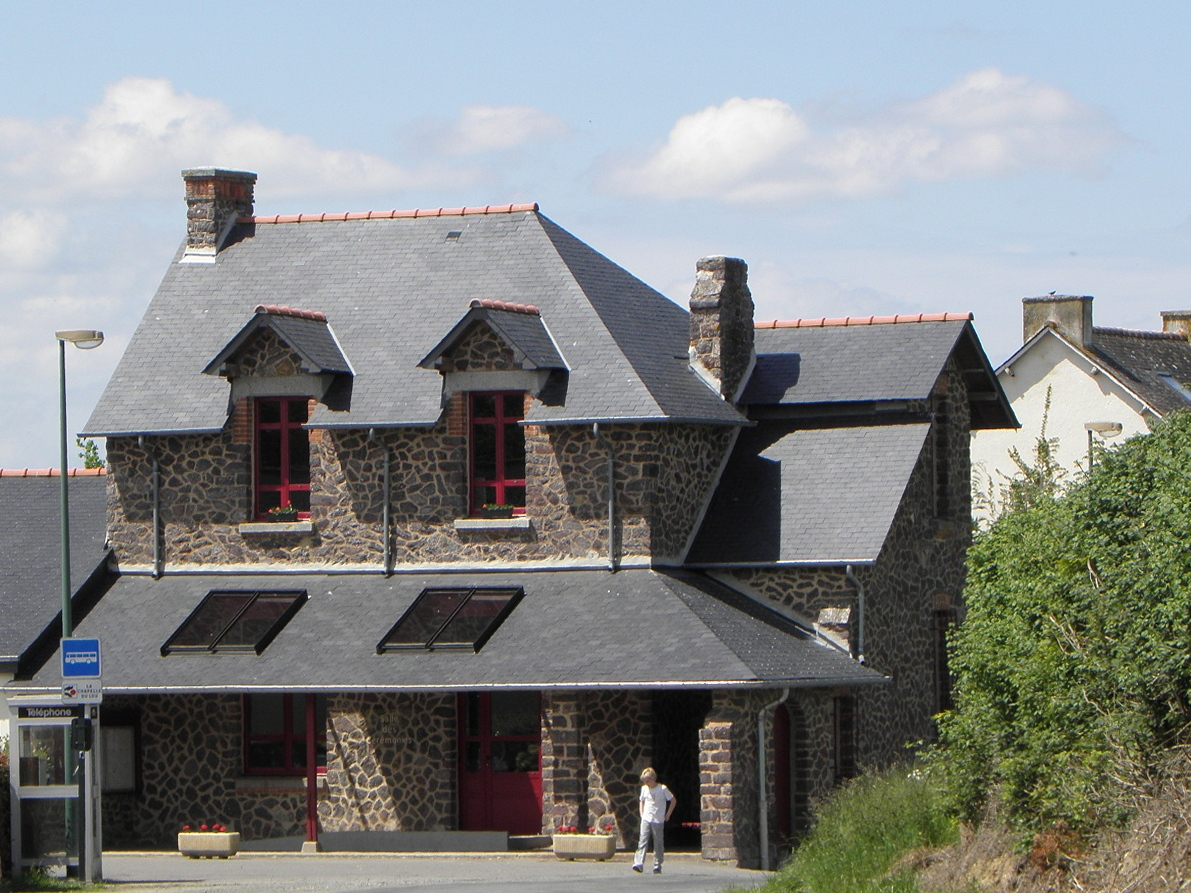
- The town hall of La Chapelle-du-Lou
- Location of La Chapelle-du-Lou-du-Lac
- Location within France Location within Brittany
- Coordinates: 48°12′50″N 1°59′24″W
- Country: France
- Region: Brittany
- Department: Ille-et-Vilaine
- Arrondissement: Rennes
- Canton: Montauban-de-Bretagne

Government
  - Mayor (2020–2026): Patrick Herviou
- Area^{1}: 10.46 km^{2} (4.04 sq mi)
- Population (2023): 1,050
  - Density: 100/km^{2} (260/sq mi)
- Time zone: UTC+01:00 (CET)
  - Summer (DST): UTC+02:00 (CEST)
- INSEE/Postal code: 35060 /35360
- ^{1} French Land Register data, which excludes lakes, ponds, glaciers > 1 km^{2} (0.386 sq mi or 247 acres) and river estuaries.

La Chapelle-du-Lou-du-Lac (French pronunciation: [la ʃapɛl dy lu dy lak]; Breton: Chapel-al-Loc'h) is a commune in the Ille-et-Vilaine department of western France. The municipality was established on 1 January 2016 and consists of the former communes of La Chapelle-du-Lou and Le Lou-du-Lac.

== See also ==
- Communes of the Ille-et-Vilaine department
