= Saint-Uniac =

Saint-Uniac Saent-Tuniau (Gallo) Sant-Tewiniav (Breton)
- Commune
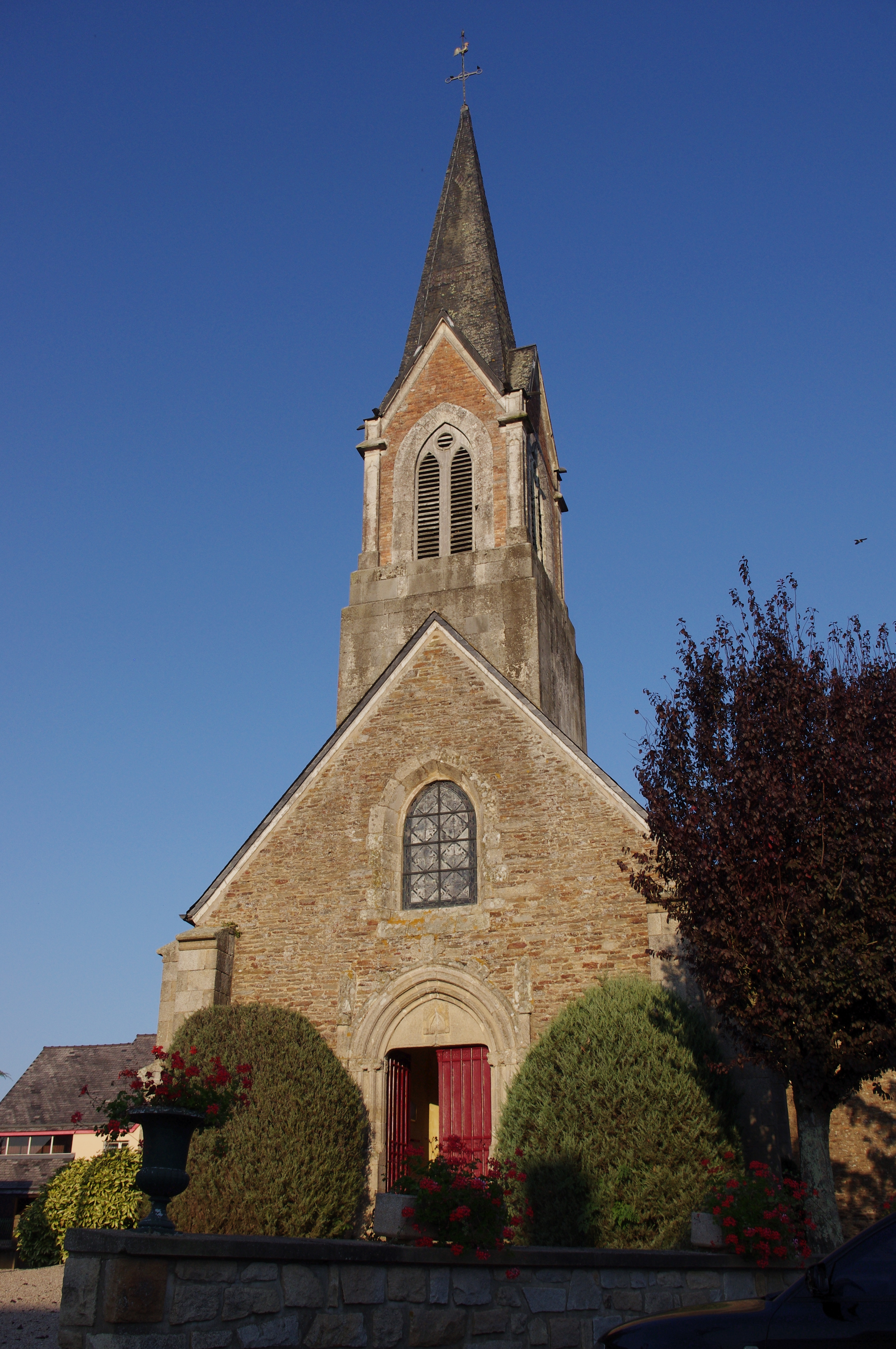
- The church of Saint-Uniac
- Location of Saint-Uniac
- Location within France Location within Brittany
- Coordinates: 48°10′26″N 2°01′39″W
- Country: France
- Region: Brittany
- Department: Ille-et-Vilaine
- Arrondissement: Rennes
- Canton: Montauban-de-Bretagne
- Intercommunality: Saint-Méen Montauban

Government
  - Mayor (2020–2026): Karine Passilly
- Area^{1}: 6.89 km^{2} (2.66 sq mi)
- Highest elevation: 96 m (315 ft)
- Lowest elevation: 45 m (148 ft)
- Population (2023): 513
  - Density: 74.5/km^{2} (193/sq mi)
- Time zone: UTC+01:00 (CET)
  - Summer (DST): UTC+02:00 (CEST)
- INSEE/Postal code: 35320 /35360
- ^{1} French Land Register data, which excludes lakes, ponds, glaciers > 1 km^{2} (0.386 sq mi or 247 acres) and river estuaries.

Saint-Uniac (French pronunciation: [sɛ̃.t‿ynjak]; Breton: Sant-Tewiniav; Gallo: Saent-Tuniau) is a commune in the Ille-et-Vilaine department in Brittany in northwestern France.

== Population ==
Inhabitants of Saint-Uniac are called Saint-Uniacais in French.

Historical population
Year	Pop.	±% p.a.
1968	236	—
1975	233	−0.18%
1982	274	+2.34%
1990	344	+2.88%
1999	350	+0.19%
2007	484	+4.14%
2012	515	+1.25%
2017	537	+0.84%
2023	513	−0.76%
Source: INSEE

== See also ==
- Communes of the Ille-et-Vilaine department
