= Médréac =

Médréac Méderiac (Gallo) Mederieg (Breton)
- Commune
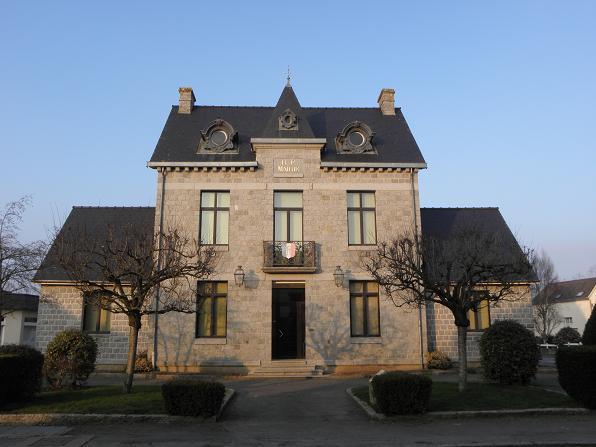
- The town hall of Médréac
- Location of Médréac
- Location within France Location within Brittany
- Coordinates: 48°16′05″N 2°03′57″W
- Country: France
- Region: Brittany
- Department: Ille-et-Vilaine
- Arrondissement: Rennes
- Canton: Montauban-de-Bretagne
- Intercommunality: Saint-Méen Montauban

Government
  - Mayor (2020–2026): Serge Collet
- Area^{1}: 35.02 km^{2} (13.52 sq mi)
- Highest elevation: 137 m (449 ft)
- Lowest elevation: 45 m (148 ft)
- Population (2023): 1,853
  - Density: 52.91/km^{2} (137.0/sq mi)
- Time zone: UTC+01:00 (CET)
  - Summer (DST): UTC+02:00 (CEST)
- INSEE/Postal code: 35171 /35360
- ^{1} French Land Register data, which excludes lakes, ponds, glaciers > 1 km^{2} (0.386 sq mi or 247 acres) and river estuaries.

Médréac (French pronunciation: [medʁeak]; Breton: Mederieg; Gallo: Méderiac) is a commune in the Ille-et-Vilaine department of Brittany in northwestern France.

== Population ==
Inhabitants of Médréac are called Médréaciens in French.

Historical population
Year	Pop.	±% p.a.
1968	1,631	—
1975	1,556	−0.67%
1982	1,512	−0.41%
1990	1,460	−0.44%
1999	1,495	+0.26%
2007	1,795	+2.31%
2012	1,829	+0.38%
2017	1,827	−0.02%
2023	1,853	+0.24%
Source: INSEE

== See also ==
- Communes of the Ille-et-Vilaine department
