= La Chapelle-Chaussée =

La Chapelle-Chaussée Chapel-ar-Galc'hed (Breton)
- Commune
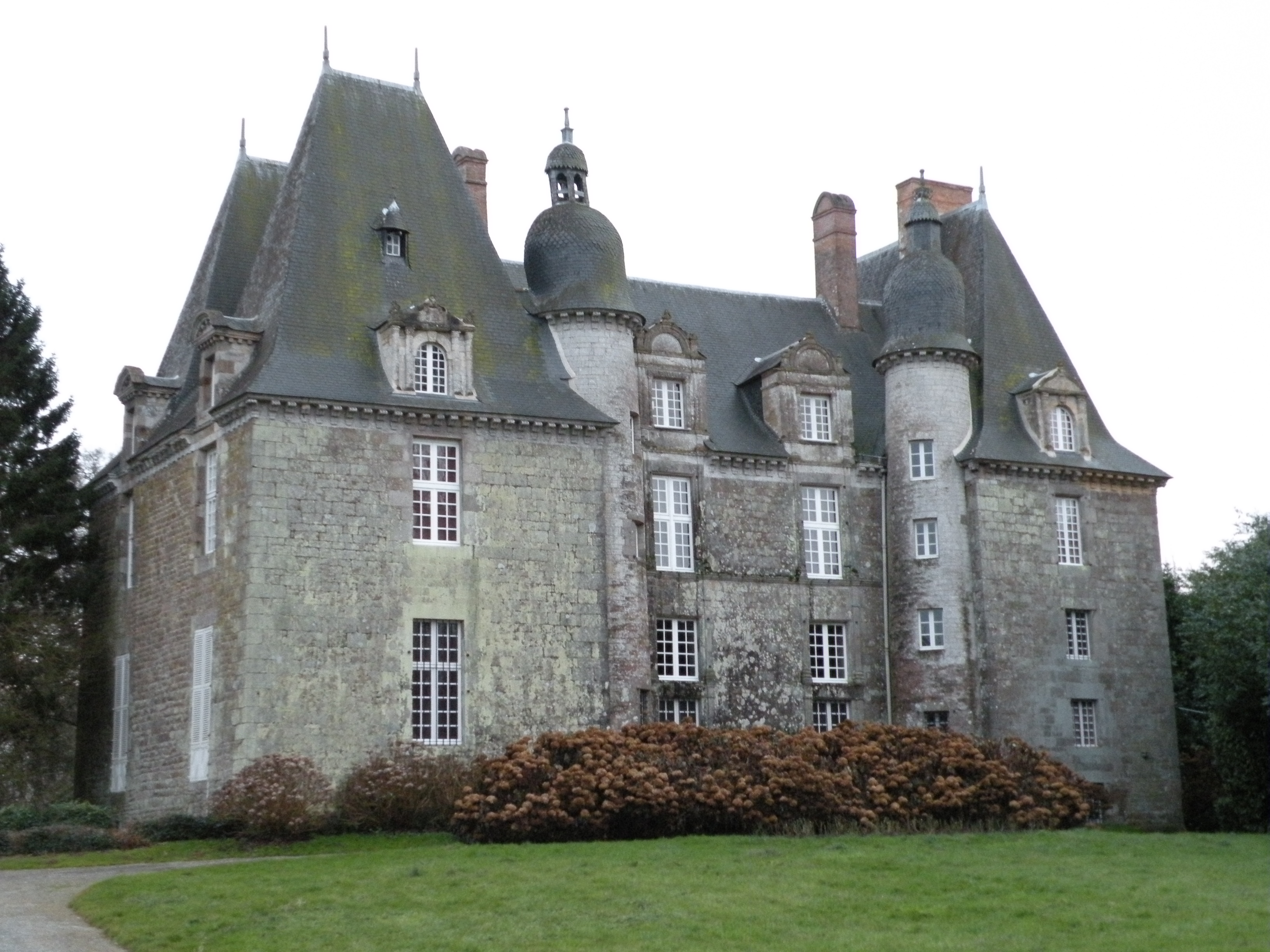
- Chateau
- Location of La Chapelle-Chaussée
- Location within France Location within Brittany
- Coordinates: 48°16′21″N 1°51′12″W
- Country: France
- Region: Brittany
- Department: Ille-et-Vilaine
- Arrondissement: Rennes
- Canton: Montauban-de-Bretagne
- Intercommunality: Rennes Métropole

Government
  - Mayor (2020–2026): Pascal Pinault
- Area^{1}: 14.76 km^{2} (5.70 sq mi)
- Highest elevation: 148 m (486 ft)
- Lowest elevation: 84 m (276 ft)
- Population (2023): 1,298
  - Density: 87.94/km^{2} (227.8/sq mi)
- Time zone: UTC+01:00 (CET)
  - Summer (DST): UTC+02:00 (CEST)
- INSEE/Postal code: 35058 /35630
- ^{1} French Land Register data, which excludes lakes, ponds, glaciers > 1 km^{2} (0.386 sq mi or 247 acres) and river estuaries.

La Chapelle-Chaussée (French pronunciation: [la ʃapɛl ʃose]; Breton: Chapel-ar-Galc'hed) is a commune in the Ille-et-Vilaine department of Brittany in north-western France.

== Population ==
Inhabitants of La Chapelle-Chaussée are called Chapellois in French.

Historical population
Year	Pop.	±% p.a.
1968	591	—
1975	546	−1.13%
1982	597	+1.28%
1990	624	+0.55%
1999	763	+2.26%
2007	1,047	+4.03%
2012	1,201	+2.78%
2017	1,271	+1.14%
2023	1,298	+0.35%
Source: INSEE

== Gallery ==
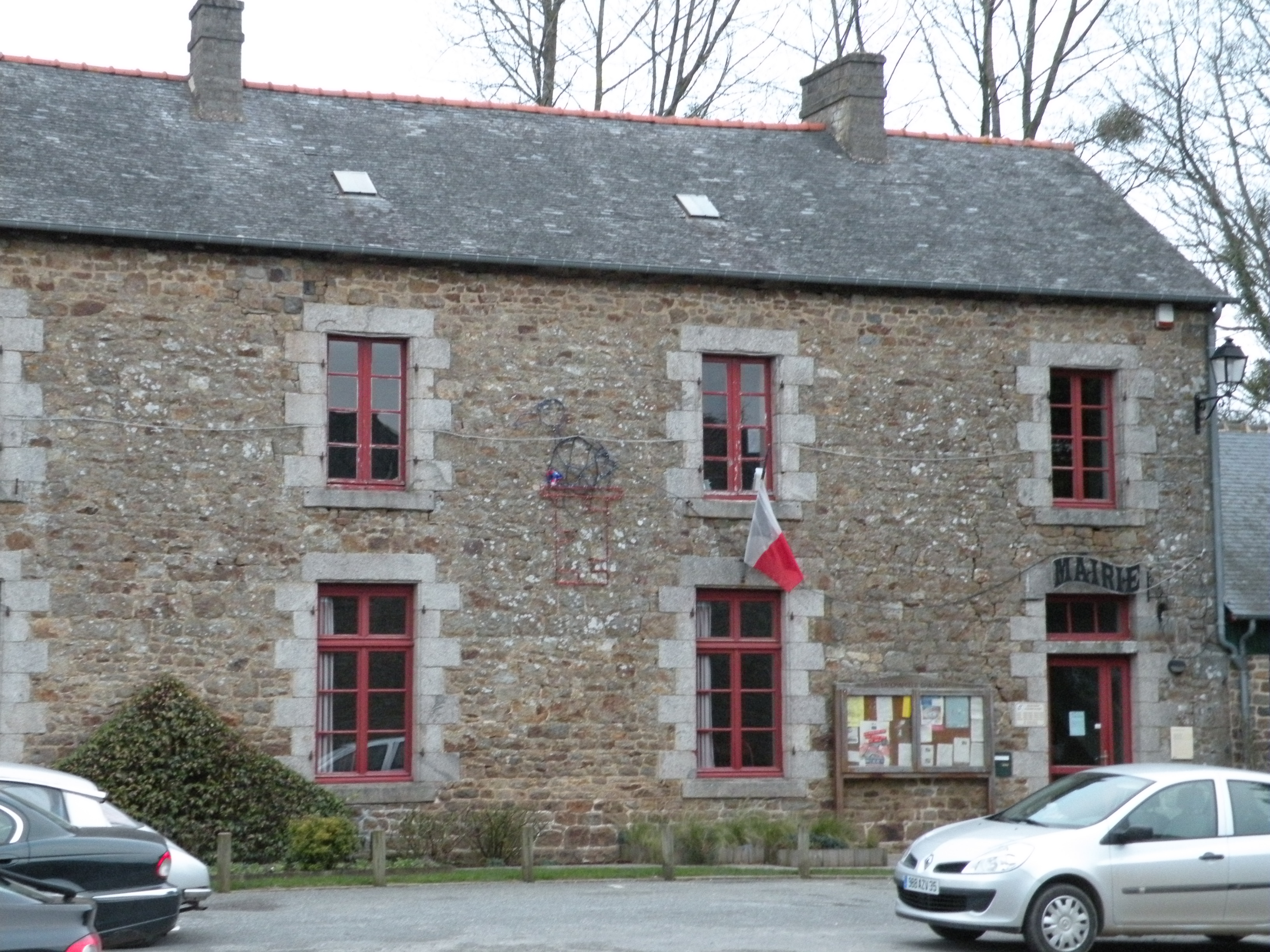
Town hall

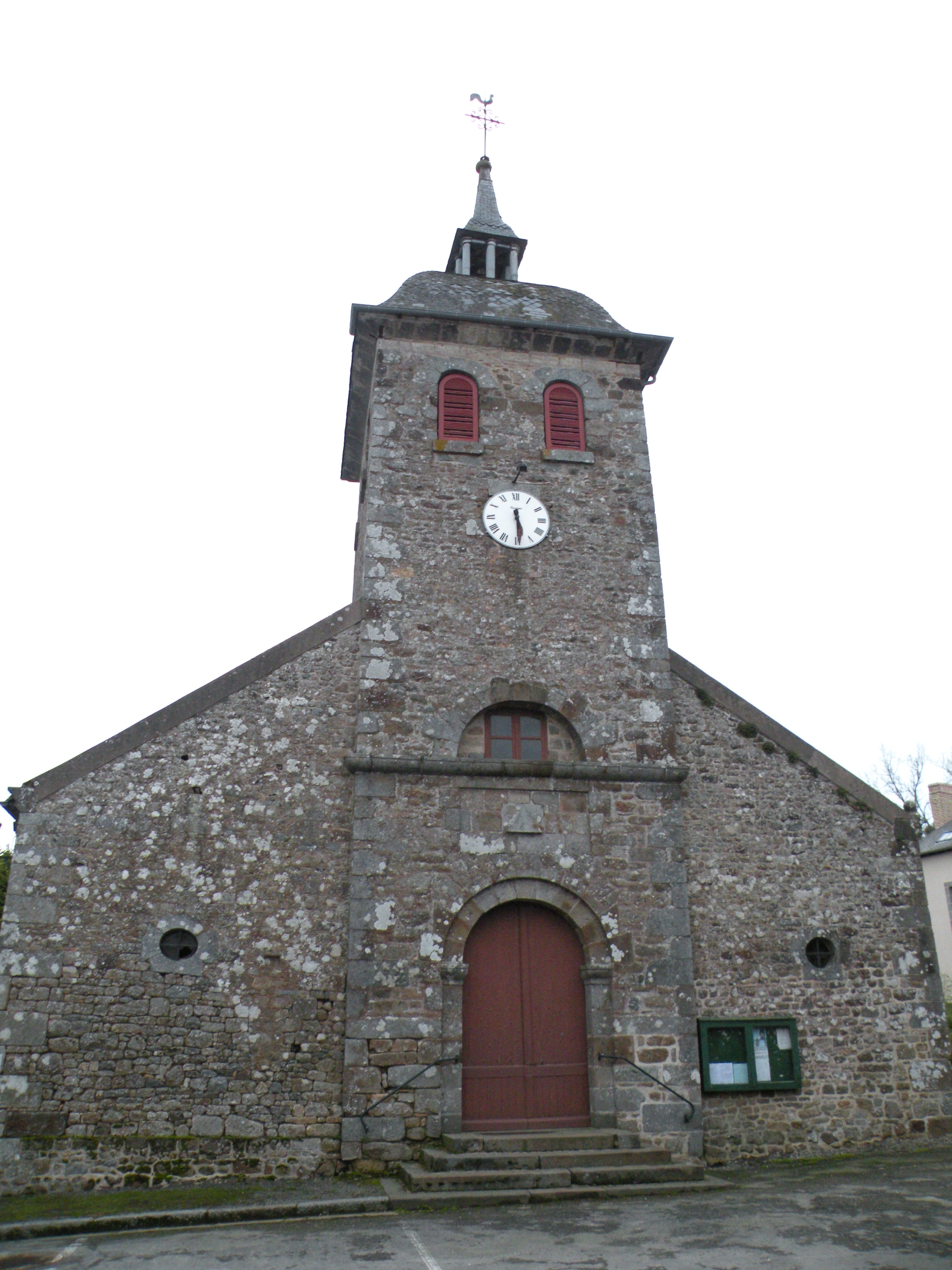
Saint-Pierre church

== See also ==
- Communes of the Ille-et-Vilaine department
