= Boisgervilly =

Boisgervilly Boéz-Jergaud (Gallo) Koad-Yarnvili (Breton)
- Commune
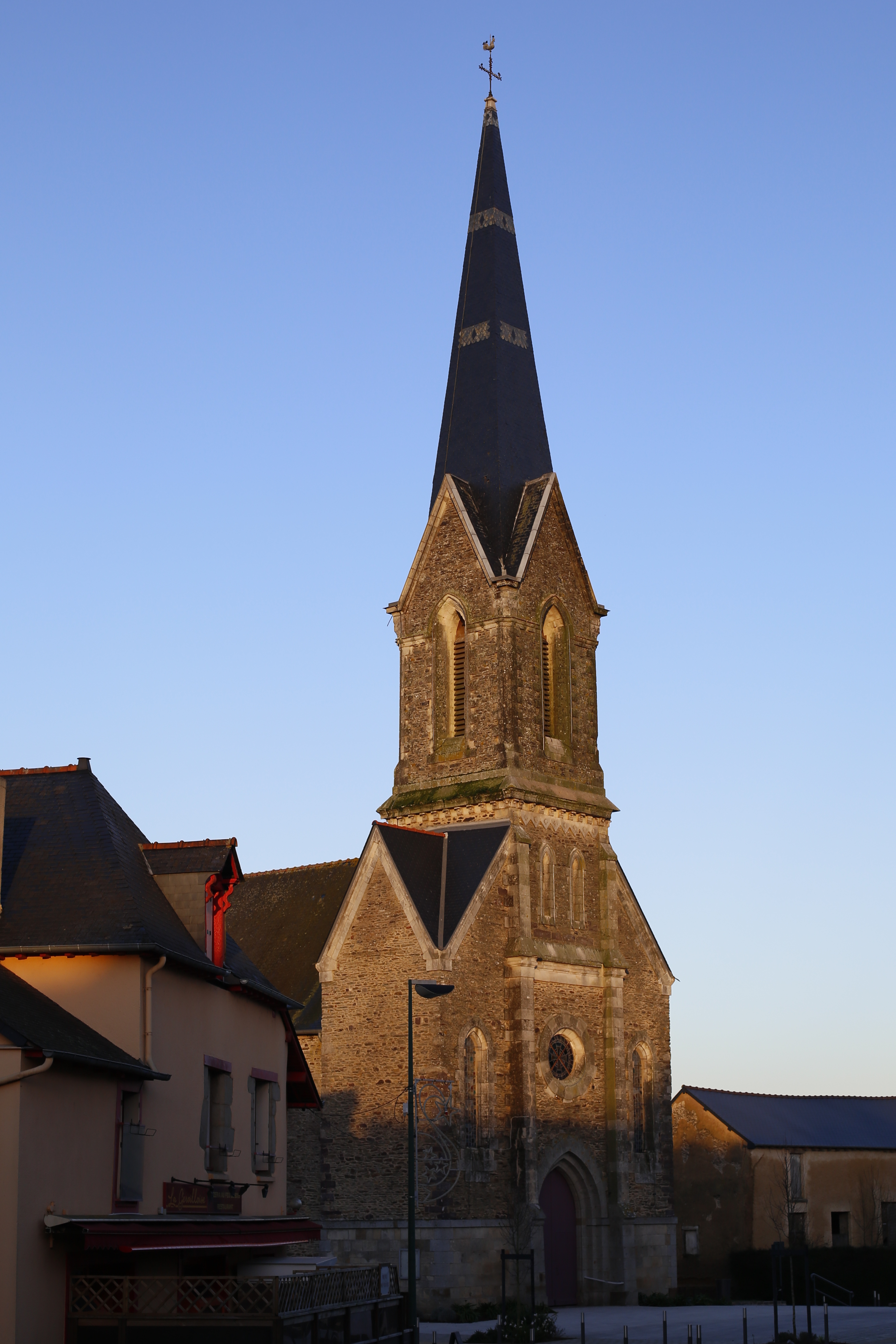
- The church of Boisgervilly
- Location of Boisgervilly
- Location within France Location within Brittany
- Coordinates: 48°10′04″N 2°03′46″W
- Country: France
- Region: Brittany
- Department: Ille-et-Vilaine
- Arrondissement: Rennes
- Canton: Montauban-de-Bretagne

Government
  - Mayor (2020–2026): Bernard Piedvache
- Area^{1}: 19.95 km^{2} (7.70 sq mi)
- Highest elevation: 111 m (364 ft)
- Lowest elevation: 58 m (190 ft)
- Population (2023): 1,804
  - Density: 90.43/km^{2} (234.2/sq mi)
- Time zone: UTC+01:00 (CET)
  - Summer (DST): UTC+02:00 (CEST)
- INSEE/Postal code: 35027 /35360
- ^{1} French Land Register data, which excludes lakes, ponds, glaciers > 1 km^{2} (0.386 sq mi or 247 acres) and river estuaries.

Boisgervilly (French pronunciation: [bwaʒɛʁvili]; Breton: Koad-Yarnvili; Gallo: Boéz-Jergaud) is a commune in the Ille-et-Vilaine department in Brittany in northwestern France.

== Population ==
The inhabitants of Boisgervilly are known as Boisgervilliens in French.

Historical population
Year	Pop.	±% p.a.
1968	936	—
1975	921	−0.23%
1982	1,074	+2.22%
1990	1,174	+1.12%
1999	1,215	+0.38%
2007	1,408	+1.86%
2012	1,562	+2.10%
2017	1,664	+1.27%
2023	1,804	+1.36%
Source: INSEE

== Sights ==
The 19th-century church has an altar from the 17th century.

The chapel of St. Antoine was built in 1427.

== See also ==
- Communes of the Ille-et-Vilaine department
