= Romillé =

Romillé Rovelieg (Breton)
- Commune
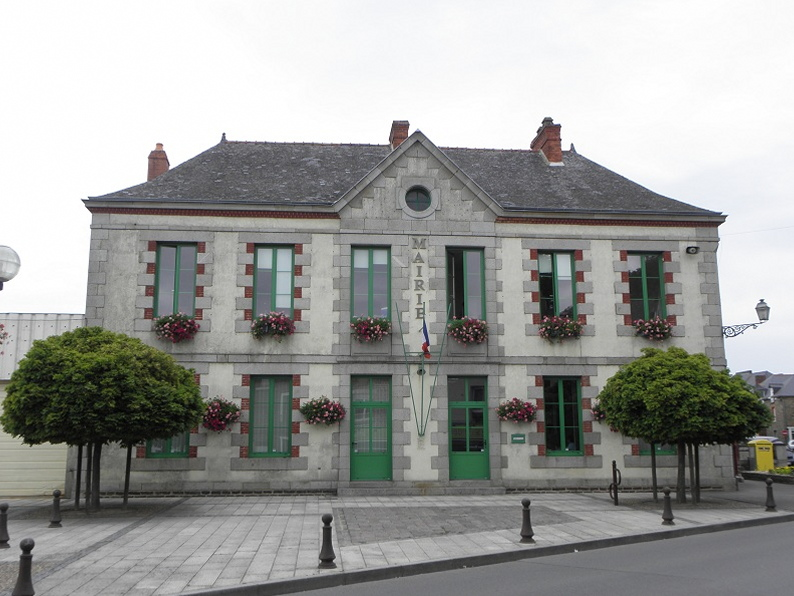
- The town hall in Romillé

- Coat of arms
- Location of Romillé
- Location within France Location within Brittany
- Coordinates: 48°13′00″N 1°53′26″W
- Country: France
- Region: Brittany
- Department: Ille-et-Vilaine
- Arrondissement: Rennes
- Canton: Montauban-de-Bretagne
- Intercommunality: Rennes Métropole

Government
  - Mayor (2020–2026): Henri Daucé
- Area^{1}: 28.67 km^{2} (11.07 sq mi)
- Highest elevation: 142 m (466 ft)
- Lowest elevation: 60 m (200 ft)
- Population (2023): 4,189
  - Density: 146.1/km^{2} (378.4/sq mi)
- Time zone: UTC+01:00 (CET)
  - Summer (DST): UTC+02:00 (CEST)
- INSEE/Postal code: 35245 /35850
- ^{1} French Land Register data, which excludes lakes, ponds, glaciers > 1 km^{2} (0.386 sq mi or 247 acres) and river estuaries.

Romillé (French pronunciation: [ʁɔmije]; Breton: Rovelieg) is a commune in the Ille-et-Vilaine department in Brittany in northwestern France.

== Population ==
Inhabitants of Romillé are called romilléens in French.

Historical population
Year	Pop.	±% p.a.
1968	1,787	—
1975	1,743	−0.36%
1982	2,183	+3.27%
1990	2,439	+1.40%
1999	2,688	+1.09%
2007	3,319	+2.67%
2012	3,709	+2.25%
2017	3,905	+1.04%
2023	4,189	+1.18%
Source: INSEE

== See also ==
- Communes of the Ille-et-Vilaine department
