= Langan, Ille-et-Vilaine =

Langan Langan
- Commune
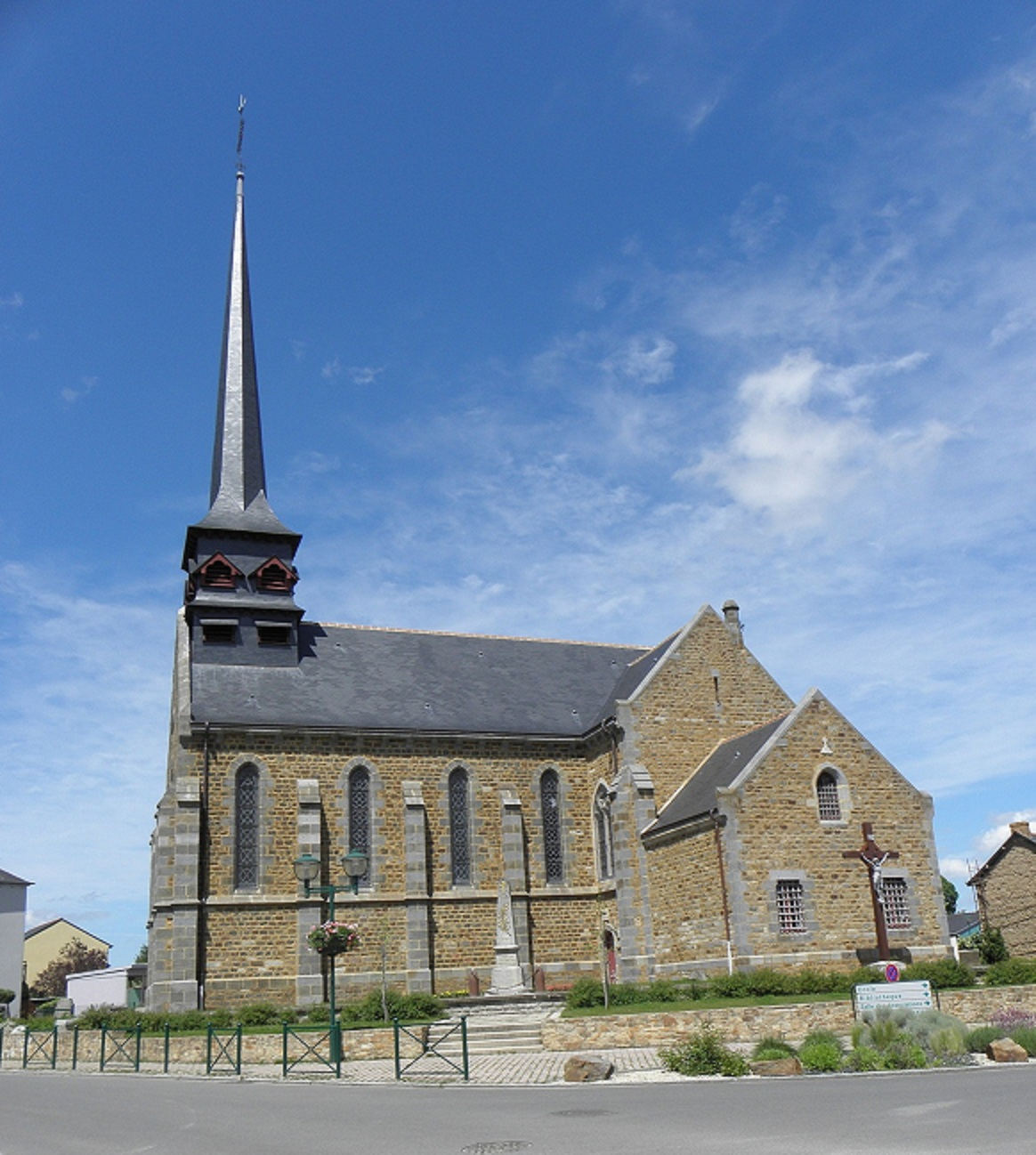
- The parish church of Saint-Martin and Saint-Pierre, in Langan

- Coat of arms
- Location of Langan
- Location within France Location within Brittany
- Coordinates: 48°14′43″N 1°51′08″W
- Country: France
- Region: Brittany
- Department: Ille-et-Vilaine
- Arrondissement: Rennes
- Canton: Montauban-de-Bretagne
- Intercommunality: Rennes Métropole

Government
  - Mayor (2024–2026): Thierry Jolivet
- Area^{1}: 7.80 km^{2} (3.01 sq mi)
- Highest elevation: 124 m (407 ft)
- Lowest elevation: 69 m (226 ft)
- Population (2023): 1,106
  - Density: 142/km^{2} (367/sq mi)
- Time zone: UTC+01:00 (CET)
  - Summer (DST): UTC+02:00 (CEST)
- INSEE/Postal code: 35144 /35850
- ^{1} French Land Register data, which excludes lakes, ponds, glaciers > 1 km^{2} (0.386 sq mi or 247 acres) and river estuaries.

Langan (French pronunciation: [lɑ̃ɡɑ̃]; Breton: Langan) is a commune in the Ille-et-Vilaine department of Brittany in north-western France.

== Population ==
Inhabitants of Langan are called in French Langanais.

Historical population
Year	Pop.	±% p.a.
1968	445	—
1975	404	−1.37%
1982	725	+8.71%
1990	806	+1.33%
1999	772	−0.48%
2007	886	+1.74%
2012	913	+0.60%
2017	979	+1.41%
2023	1,106	+2.05%
Source: INSEE

== See also ==
- Communes of the Ille-et-Vilaine department
