= Saint-Méen-le-Grand =

Saint-Méen-le-Grand Saent-Men (Gallo) Sant-Meven (Breton)
- Commune
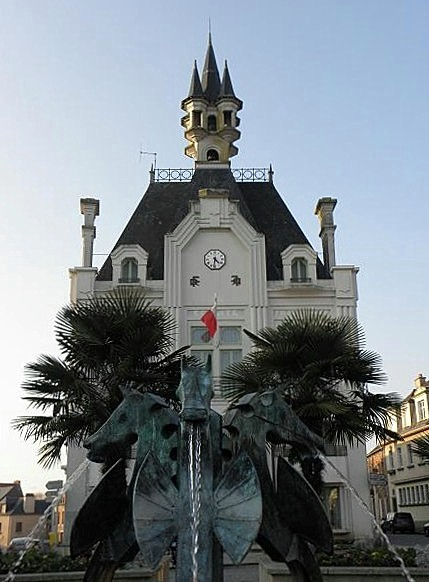
- Town hall

- Coat of arms
- Location of Saint-Méen-le-Grand
- Location within France Location within Brittany
- Coordinates: 48°11′24″N 2°11′23″W
- Country: France
- Region: Brittany
- Department: Ille-et-Vilaine
- Arrondissement: Rennes
- Canton: Montauban-de-Bretagne

Government
  - Mayor (2020–2026): Pierre Guitton
- Area^{1}: 18.21 km^{2} (7.03 sq mi)
- Highest elevation: 123 m (404 ft)
- Lowest elevation: 79 m (259 ft)
- Population (2023): 4,653
  - Density: 255.5/km^{2} (661.8/sq mi)
- Time zone: UTC+01:00 (CET)
  - Summer (DST): UTC+02:00 (CEST)
- INSEE/Postal code: 35297 /35290
- ^{1} French Land Register data, which excludes lakes, ponds, glaciers > 1 km^{2} (0.386 sq mi or 247 acres) and river estuaries.

Saint-Méen-le-Grand (French pronunciation: [sɛ̃ mɛ̃ lə ɡʁɑ̃]; Breton: Sant-Meven; Gallo: Saent-Men) is a commune in the Ille-et-Vilaine department in Brittany in northwestern France.

The commune is listed as a Village étape.

It is located west of Rennes between Montauban-de-Bretagne and Gaël.

The town was the birthplace of the 3-time Tour de France winner Louison Bobet. It has hosted the start of Stage 8 of both the 2006 and 2025 Tours.

== Population ==
Inhabitants of Saint-Méen-le-Grand are called mévennais in French.

Historical population
Year	Pop.	±% p.a.
1968	3,063	—
1975	3,358	+1.32%
1982	3,742	+1.56%
1990	3,729	−0.04%
1999	3,566	−0.50%
2007	4,180	+2.01%
2012	4,526	+1.60%
2017	4,635	+0.48%
2023	4,653	+0.06%
Source: INSEE

== See also ==
- Saint-Méen Abbey
- Communes of the Ille-et-Vilaine department
