= Bécherel =

Bécherel Becherèu (Gallo) Begerel (Breton)
- Commune
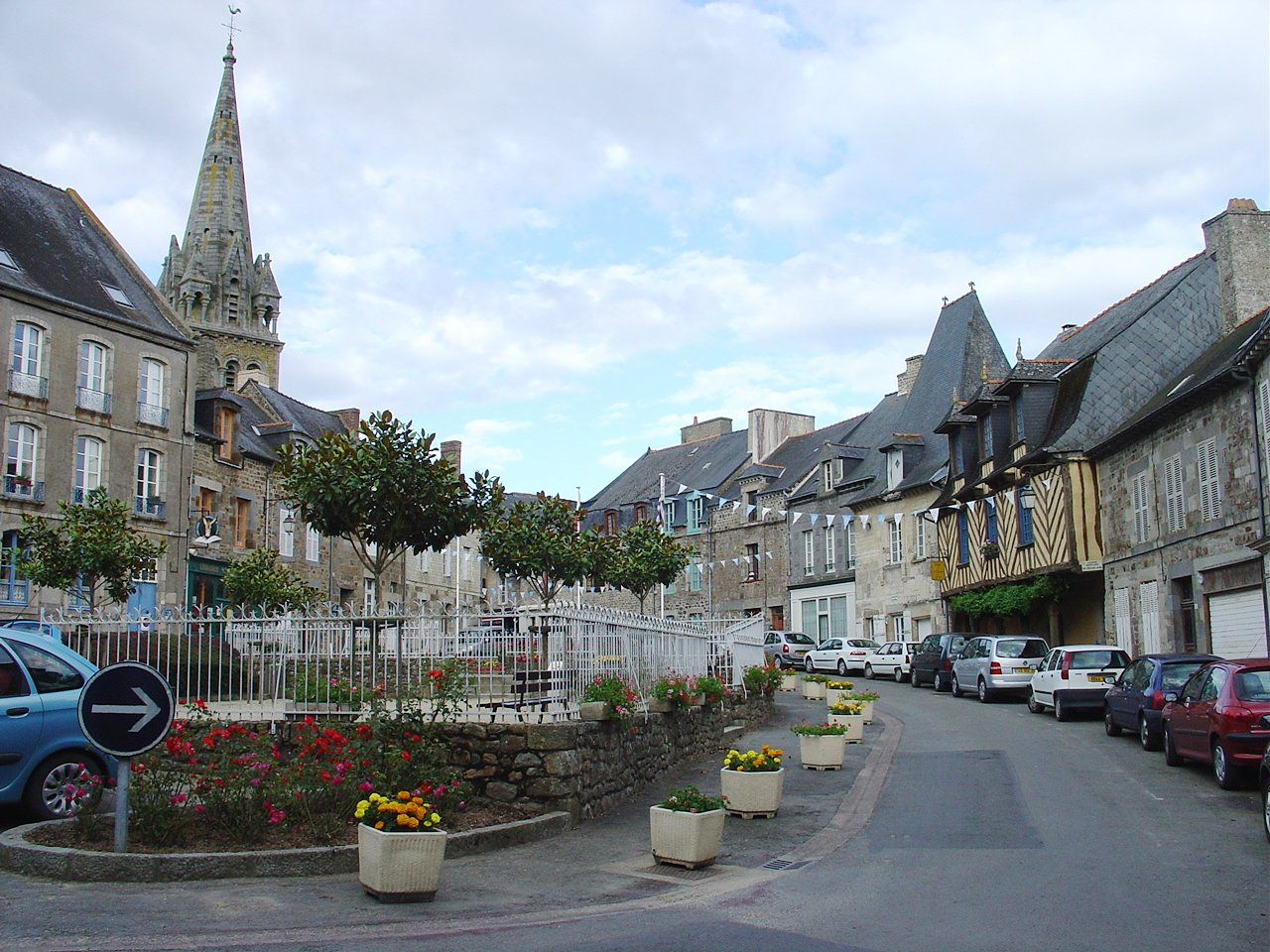
- A general view of Bécherel

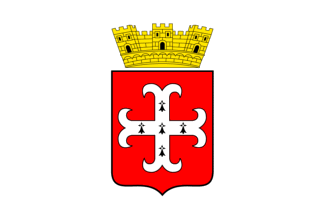
- Flag Coat of arms
- Location of Bécherel
- Location within France Location within Brittany
- Coordinates: 48°17′46″N 1°56′38″W
- Country: France
- Region: Brittany
- Department: Ille-et-Vilaine
- Arrondissement: Rennes
- Canton: Montauban-de-Bretagne
- Intercommunality: Rennes Métropole

Government
  - Mayor (2020–2026): Mélina Parmentier
- Area^{1}: 0.5 km^{2} (0.19 sq mi)
- Elevation: 166 m (545 ft)
- Highest elevation: 177 m (581 ft)
- Lowest elevation: 113 m (371 ft)
- Population (2023): 677
  - Density: 1,400/km^{2} (3,500/sq mi)
- Time zone: UTC+01:00 (CET)
  - Summer (DST): UTC+02:00 (CEST)
- INSEE/Postal code: 35022 /35190
- ^{1} French Land Register data, which excludes lakes, ponds, glaciers > 1 km^{2} (0.386 sq mi or 247 acres) and river estuaries.

Bécherel (French pronunciation: [beʃʁɛl]; Breton: Begerel, Gallo: Becherèu) is a commune in the Ille-et-Vilaine department in Brittany in northwestern France.

== History ==
During the Roman times the town was positioned close to the important road linking Rennes with Dinan to the north.

In 1124 Alain de Dinan was granted a substantial portion of land which he used to build a (stone) castle. This dominated the valley and the present town grew up around the castle.

In 1168 Henry II, the Le Mans born English king, seized the strategically important town of Bécherel and fortified it.

In the middle years of the fourteenth century, during the Breton War of Succession the English, who were allied with Jean IV (sometimes called Jean V according to the writer's point of view) of Brittany, occupied Bécherel. In 1363 Charles of Blois, accompanied by Bertrand du Guesclin, known also as the Black Dog of Brocéliande, laid siege to the town, but Jean's forces aggressively and successfully resisted. The parties decided to meet near Évran to resolve their differences, but the bishops now intervened and a partition of Brittany between the two parties was determined.

Troubles returned in April 1371 when Olivier de Clisson laid siege to the town. Bertrand du Guesclin joined in against the English, who still held Bécherel, in August 1371.

In 1419 Anne of Laval, who had inherited the barony through the decease of her brother, restored the town's fortifications, but by the sixteenth century the place had fallen into ruins. Between the 16th end 18th centuries prosperity returned, thanks to the cultivation and weaving of linen and hemp. Under Napoleon the "Continental System/Blockade" caused much damage to these industries, however, and they also suffered increasingly through the import to Europe of cheap cotton during the 19th century.

Though Bécherel was in the heart of the territory claimed by the Chouan royalists in the 1789 French Revolution, others would support the Republic especially after 1794 when the worst of the blood letting came to an end with the execution of Robespierre. The anniversary of the king's execution was still being widely celebrated each January 21 at the start of the twentieth century.

The nineteenth century saw the development of various leather based industries, and a factory manufacturing agricultural machinery underpinned the local economy. Between 1914 and 1971 the town was also the home of a large Dairy business. More recently the economy has increasingly been based on tourism and on the book trade.

== Book town ==
Bécherel is a small village, called the "village of the books" because there are fifteen bookstores for around 660 inhabitants. Events and performances taking place at Bécherel include: the European Festival of Ancient Greek and Latin, in March, for the national "Spring of Poets" weekend. The "Fête du Livre", each Easter week-end, the Night of Books (August), "Lire en Fête" (October), Treasures of Bécherel (December).

== Population ==
Inhabitants of Bécherel are called Bécherellais in French.

Historical population

Year	Pop.	±% p.a.
1793	882	—
1821	690	−0.87%
1846	836	+0.77%
1872	816	−0.09%
1901	855	+0.16%
1926	709	−0.75%
1946	733	+0.17%
1962	659	−0.66%
1968	626	−0.85%

Year	Pop.	±% p.a.
1975	543	−2.01%
1982	528	−0.40%
1990	599	+1.59%
1999	660	+1.08%
2007	731	+1.29%
2012	745	+0.38%
2017	669	−2.13%
2023	677	+0.20%

Source: EHESS and INSEE

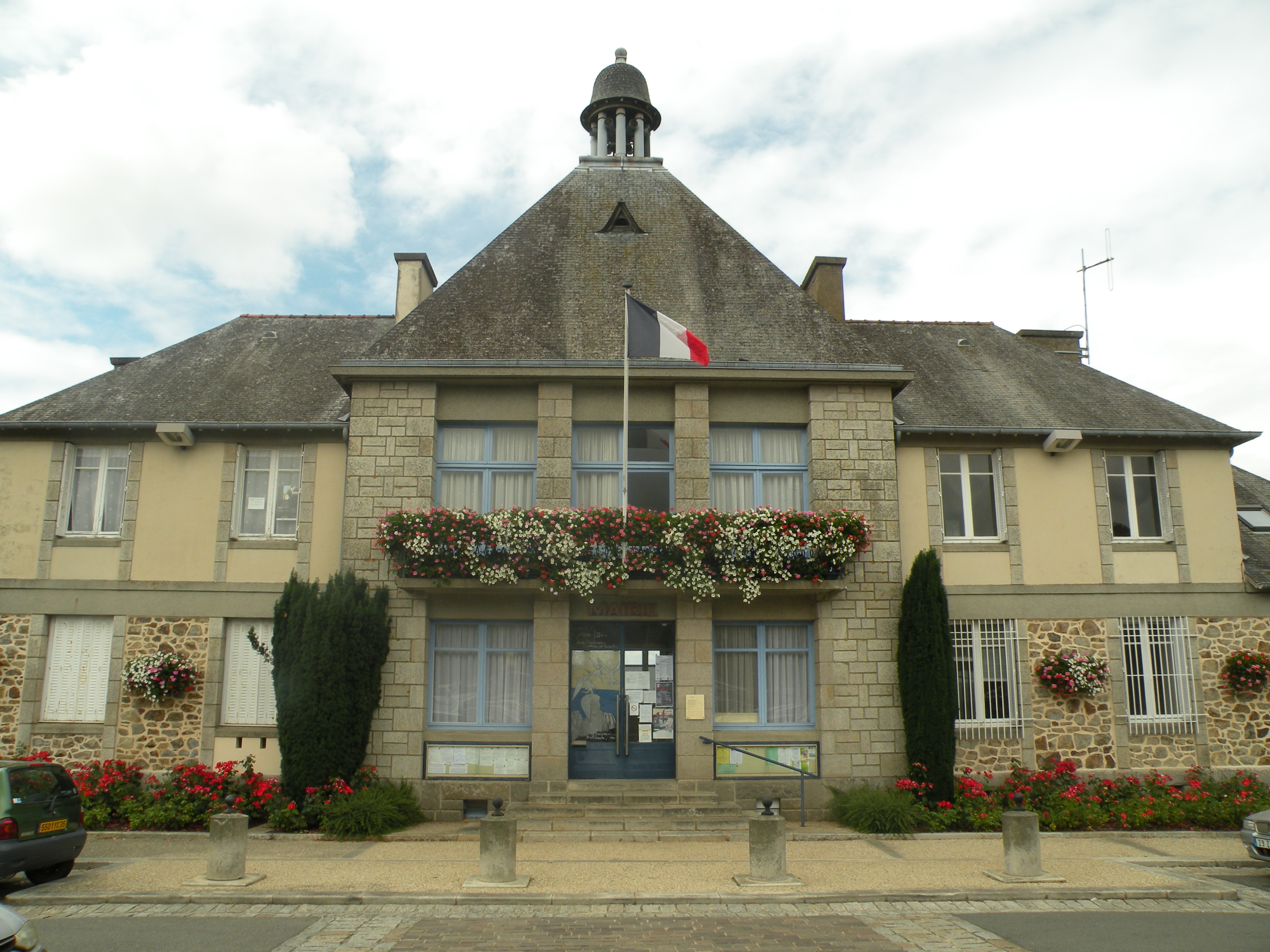
Town hall

== See also ==
- Communes of the Ille-et-Vilaine department
