= Saint-Malon-sur-Mel =

Saint-Malon-sur-Mel Saent-Méha (Gallo) Sant-Malon (Breton)
- Commune
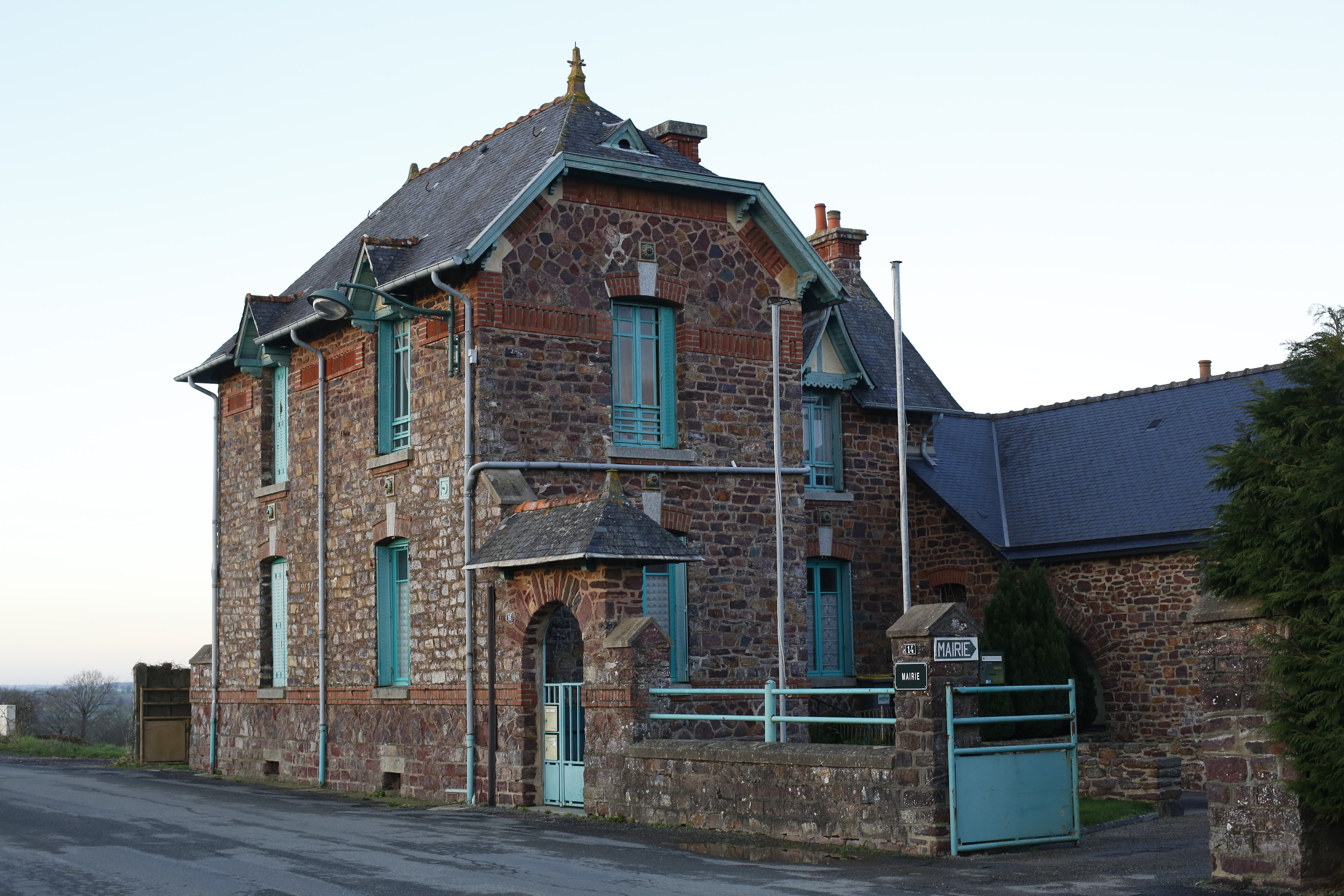
- The town hall of Saint-Malon-sur-Mel

- Coat of arms
- Location of Saint-Malon-sur-Mel
- Location within France Location within Brittany
- Coordinates: 48°05′38″N 2°05′51″W
- Country: France
- Region: Brittany
- Department: Ille-et-Vilaine
- Arrondissement: Rennes
- Canton: Montauban-de-Bretagne

Government
  - Mayor (2020–2026): Gilles Le Métayer
- Area^{1}: 16.07 km^{2} (6.20 sq mi)
- Highest elevation: 116 m (381 ft)
- Lowest elevation: 46 m (151 ft)
- Population (2023): 618
  - Density: 38.5/km^{2} (99.6/sq mi)
- Time zone: UTC+01:00 (CET)
  - Summer (DST): UTC+02:00 (CEST)
- INSEE/Postal code: 35290 /35750
- ^{1} French Land Register data, which excludes lakes, ponds, glaciers > 1 km^{2} (0.386 sq mi or 247 acres) and river estuaries.

Saint-Malon-sur-Mel (French pronunciation: [sɛ̃ malɔ̃ syʁ mɛl]; Breton: Sant-Malon; Gallo: Saent-Méha) is a commune in the Ille-et-Vilaine department of Brittany in northwestern France.

== Population ==
Inhabitants of Saint-Malon-sur-Mel are called malonnais in French.

Historical population
Year	Pop.	±% p.a.
1968	554	—
1975	492	−1.68%
1982	449	−1.30%
1990	447	−0.06%
1999	447	+0.00%
2007	554	+2.72%
2012	605	+1.78%
2017	576	−0.98%
2023	618	+1.18%
Source: INSEE

== See also ==
- Communes of the Ille-et-Vilaine department
