= Bléruais =

Bléruais Bleruaz (Gallo) Blerwaz (Breton)
- Commune
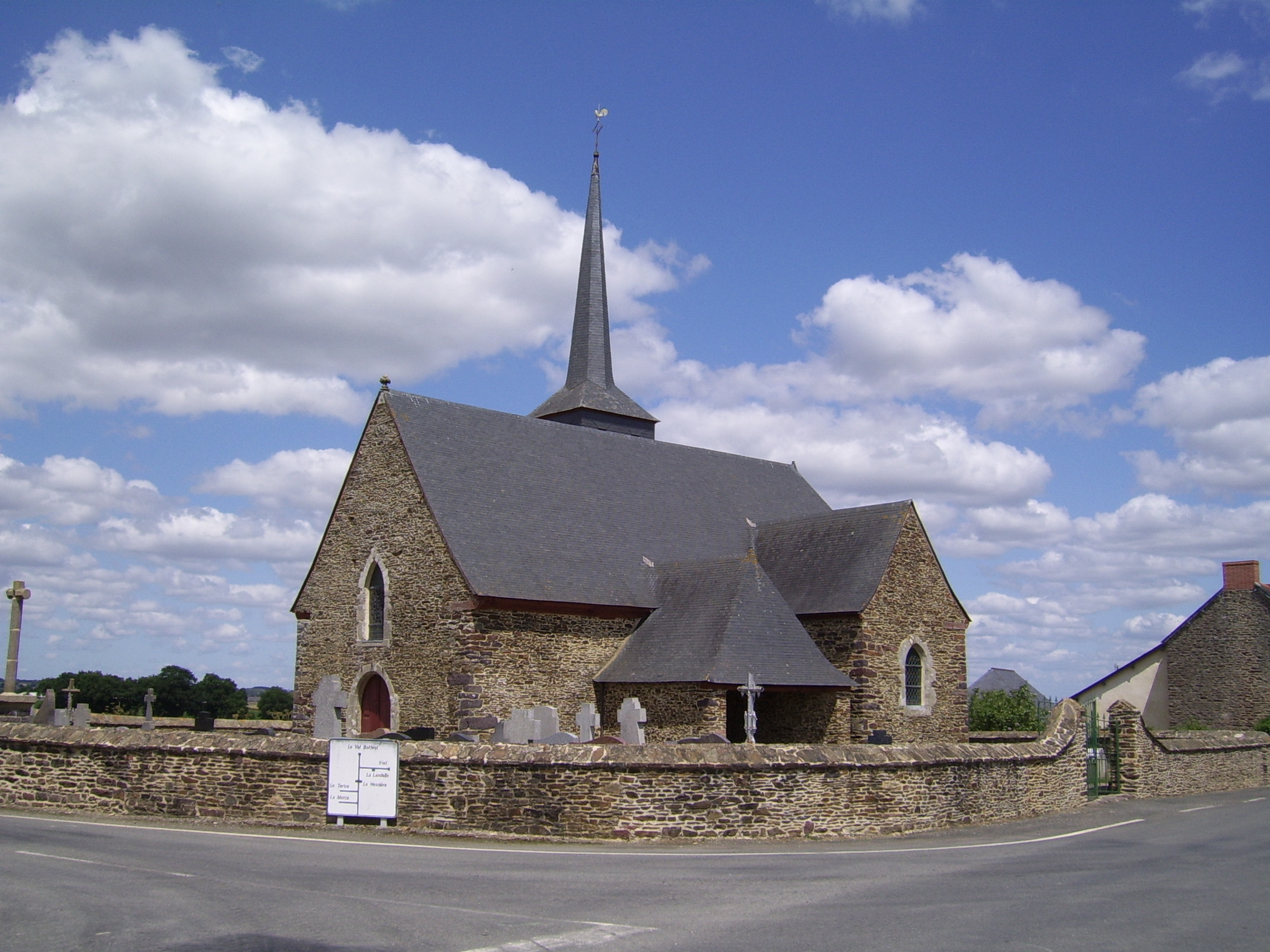
- Saint Armel church

- Coat of arms
- Location of Bléruais
- Location within France Location within Brittany
- Coordinates: 48°06′43″N 2°07′24″W
- Country: France
- Region: Brittany
- Department: Ille-et-Vilaine
- Arrondissement: Rennes
- Canton: Montauban-de-Bretagne
- Intercommunality: CC Saint-Méen Montauban

Government
  - Mayor (2020–2026): Maryse Lecomte
- Area^{1}: 3.33 km^{2} (1.29 sq mi)
- Highest elevation: 97 m (318 ft)
- Lowest elevation: 45 m (148 ft)
- Population (2023): 97
  - Density: 29/km^{2} (75/sq mi)
- Time zone: UTC+01:00 (CET)
  - Summer (DST): UTC+02:00 (CEST)
- INSEE/Postal code: 35026 /35750
- ^{1} French Land Register data, which excludes lakes, ponds, glaciers > 1 km^{2} (0.386 sq mi or 247 acres) and river estuaries.

Bléruais (French pronunciation: [bleʁɥɛ]; Breton: Blerwaz; Gallo: Bleruaz) is a commune in the Ille-et-Vilaine department in Brittany in northwestern France.

== Geography ==
The River Meu forms most of the commune's northern boundary.

== Population ==
Historical population
Year	Pop.	±% p.a.
1968	109	—
1975	104	−0.67%
1982	86	−2.68%
1990	62	−4.01%
1999	60	−0.36%
2007	95	+5.91%
2012	103	+1.63%
2017	107	+0.76%
2023	97	−1.62%
Source: INSEE

The inhabitants of Bléruais are known as Bléruaisiens in French.

== See also ==
- Communes of the Ille-et-Vilaine department
