= Saint-Maugan =

Saint-Maugan Saent-Maugant (Gallo) Sant-Malgant (Breton)
- Commune
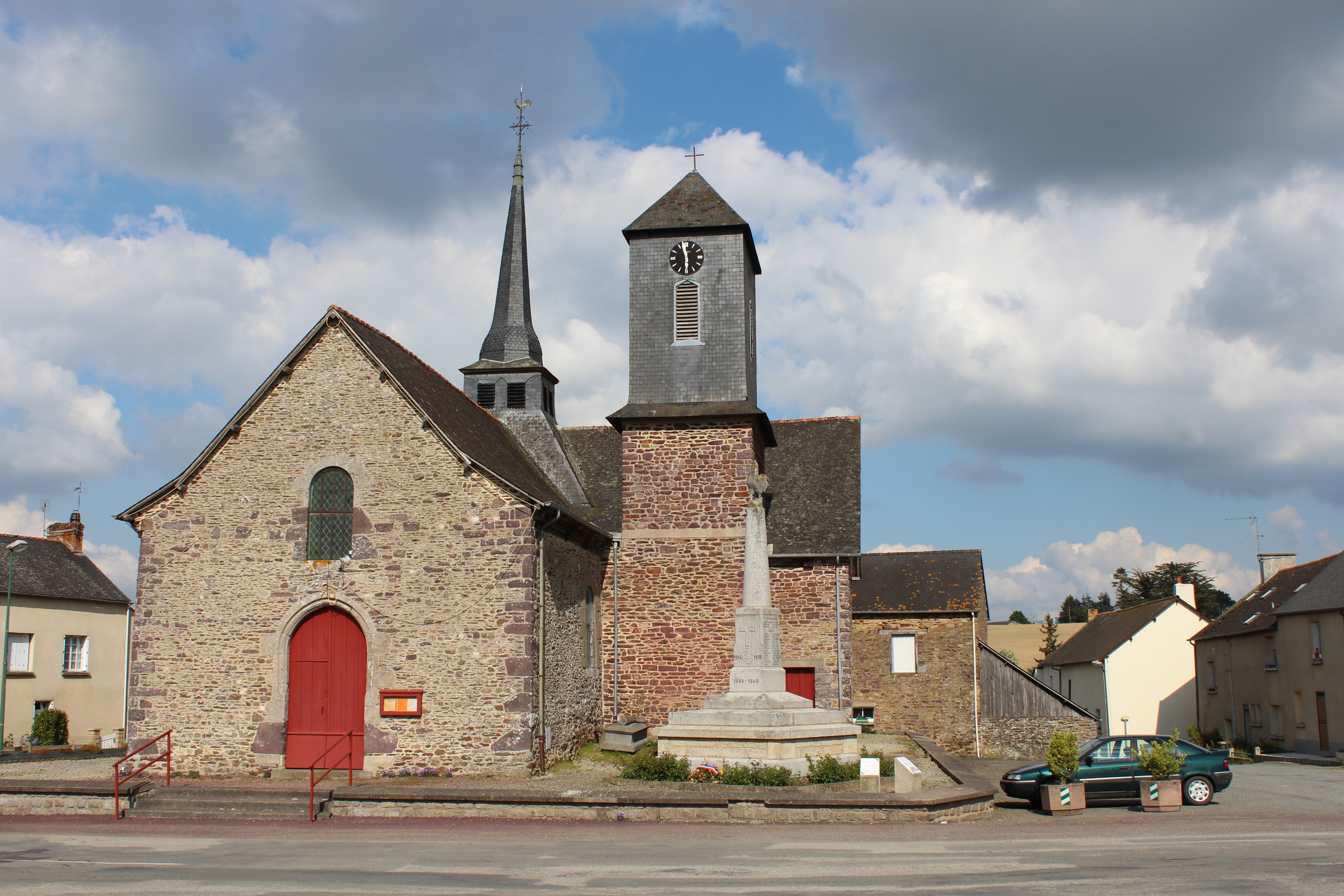
- The church of Saint-Maugan

- Coat of arms
- Location of Saint-Maugan
- Location within France Location within Brittany
- Coordinates: 48°08′09″N 2°04′56″W
- Country: France
- Region: Brittany
- Department: Ille-et-Vilaine
- Arrondissement: Rennes
- Canton: Montauban-de-Bretagne
- Intercommunality: Saint-Méen Montauban

Government
  - Mayor (2020–2026): Etienne Bonnin
- Area^{1}: 8.43 km^{2} (3.25 sq mi)
- Highest elevation: 98 m (322 ft)
- Lowest elevation: 42 m (138 ft)
- Population (2023): 505
  - Density: 59.9/km^{2} (155/sq mi)
- Time zone: UTC+01:00 (CET)
  - Summer (DST): UTC+02:00 (CEST)
- INSEE/Postal code: 35295 /35750
- ^{1} French Land Register data, which excludes lakes, ponds, glaciers > 1 km^{2} (0.386 sq mi or 247 acres) and river estuaries.

Saint-Maugan (French pronunciation: [sɛ̃ moɡɑ̃]; Breton: Sant-Malgant; Gallo: Saent-Maugant) is a commune in the Ille-et-Vilaine department in Brittany in northwestern France.

== Geography ==
The commune is traversed by the Meu river.

== Population ==
Inhabitants of Saint-Maugan are called malganais in French.

Historical population
Year	Pop.	±% p.a.
1968	363	—
1975	322	−1.70%
1982	321	−0.04%
1990	384	+2.27%
1999	349	−1.06%
2007	515	+4.98%
2012	574	+2.19%
2017	544	−1.07%
2023	505	−1.23%
Source: INSEE

== See also ==
- Communes of the Ille-et-Vilaine department
