= Quédillac =

Quédillac Qedilhac (Gallo) Kedilieg (Breton)
- Commune
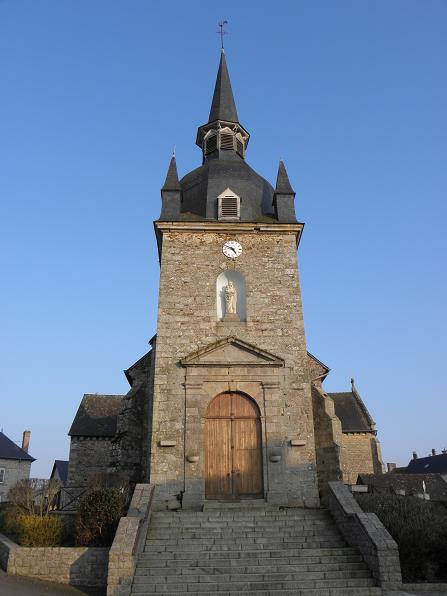
- The church of Saint-Pierre, in Quédillac

- Coat of arms
- Location of Quédillac
- Location within France Location within Brittany
- Coordinates: 48°15′01″N 2°08′29″W
- Country: France
- Region: Brittany
- Department: Ille-et-Vilaine
- Arrondissement: Rennes
- Canton: Montauban-de-Bretagne
- Intercommunality: Saint-Méen Montauban

Government
  - Mayor (2020–2026): Hubert Lorand
- Area^{1}: 26.54 km^{2} (10.25 sq mi)
- Highest elevation: 121 m (397 ft)
- Lowest elevation: 0 m (0 ft)
- Population (2023): 1,287
  - Density: 48.49/km^{2} (125.6/sq mi)
- Time zone: UTC+01:00 (CET)
  - Summer (DST): UTC+02:00 (CEST)
- INSEE/Postal code: 35234 /35290
- ^{1} French Land Register data, which excludes lakes, ponds, glaciers > 1 km^{2} (0.386 sq mi or 247 acres) and river estuaries.

Quédillac (French pronunciation: [kedijak]; Gallo: Qedilhac, Breton: Kedilieg) is a commune in the Ille-et-Vilaine department in Brittany northwestern France.

== Population ==
Inhabitants of Quédillac are called Quédillacais in French.

Historical population
Year	Pop.	±% p.a.
1968	1,113	—
1975	1,046	−0.88%
1982	1,015	−0.43%
1990	1,018	+0.04%
1999	966	−0.58%
2007	1,067	+1.25%
2012	1,170	+1.86%
2017	1,186	+0.27%
2023	1,287	+1.37%
Source: INSEE

== See also ==
- Communes of the Ille-et-Vilaine department
