= Le Crouais =

Le Crouais Le Qeróàez (Gallo) Ar Groez (Breton)
- Commune
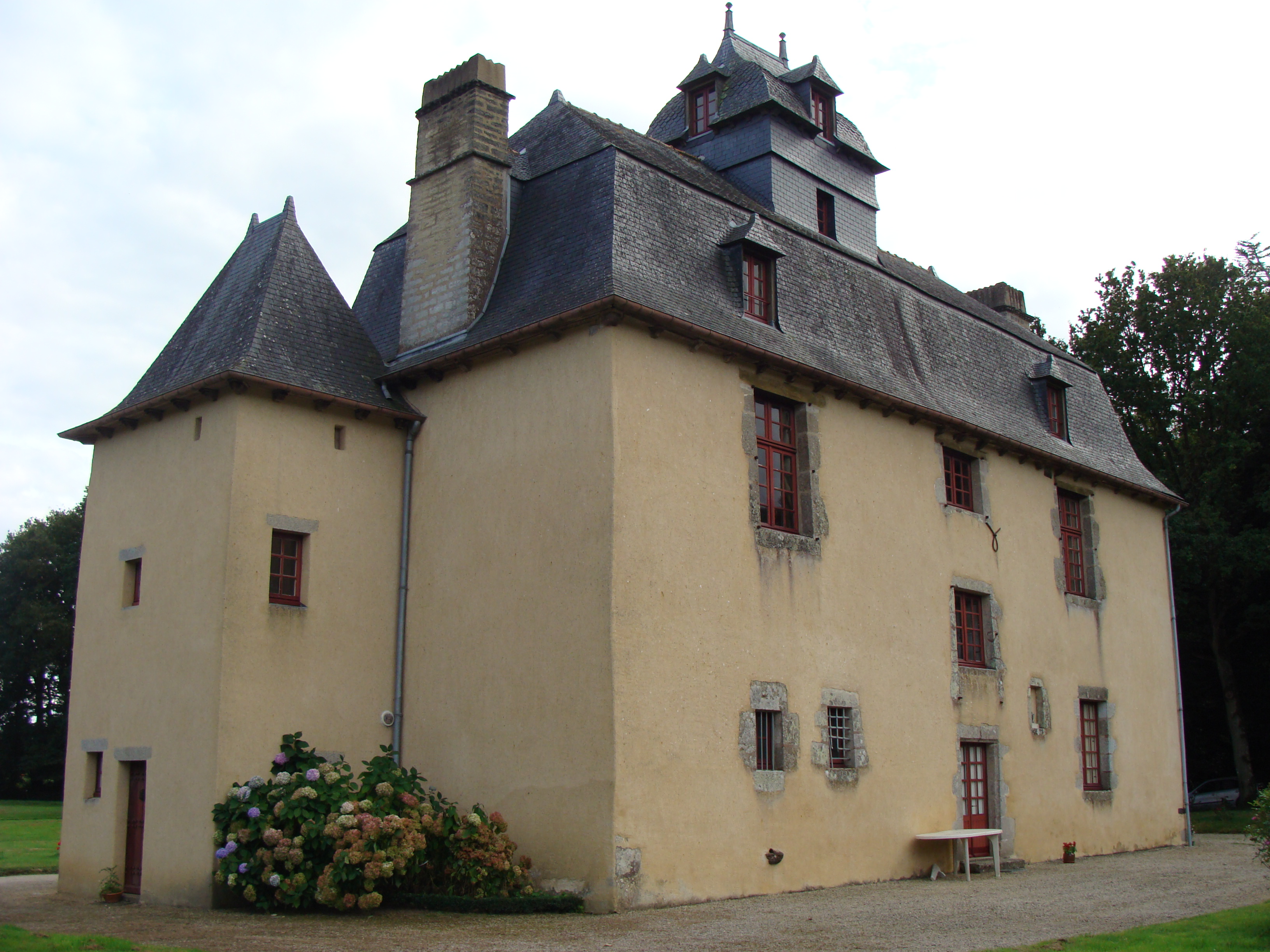
- La Louverie Manor

- Coat of arms
- Location of Le Crouais
- Location within France Location within Brittany
- Coordinates: 48°12′29″N 2°08′14″W
- Country: France
- Region: Brittany
- Department: Ille-et-Vilaine
- Arrondissement: Rennes
- Canton: Montauban-de-Bretagne
- Intercommunality: Saint-Méen Montauban

Government
  - Mayor (2020–2026): Daniel Chicoine
- Area^{1}: 6.25 km^{2} (2.41 sq mi)
- Highest elevation: 114 m (374 ft)
- Lowest elevation: 77 m (253 ft)
- Population (2023): 592
  - Density: 94.7/km^{2} (245/sq mi)
- Time zone: UTC+01:00 (CET)
  - Summer (DST): UTC+02:00 (CEST)
- INSEE/Postal code: 35091 /35290
- ^{1} French Land Register data, which excludes lakes, ponds, glaciers > 1 km^{2} (0.386 sq mi or 247 acres) and river estuaries.

Le Crouais (French pronunciation: [lə kʁuɛ]; Gallo: Le Qeróàez, Breton: Ar Groez) is a commune in the Ille-et-Vilaine department of Brittany in north-western France.

== Population ==
Inhabitants of Le Crouais are called in French Crouaisiens.

Historical population
Year	Pop.	±% p.a.
1968	340	—
1975	302	−1.68%
1982	335	+1.49%
1990	356	+0.76%
1999	360	+0.12%
2007	471	+3.42%
2012	522	+2.08%
2017	574	+1.92%
2023	592	+0.52%
Source: INSEE

== See also ==
- Communes of the Ille-et-Vilaine department
