= Muel, Ille-et-Vilaine =

Muel Muèu (Gallo) Moel (Breton)
- Commune
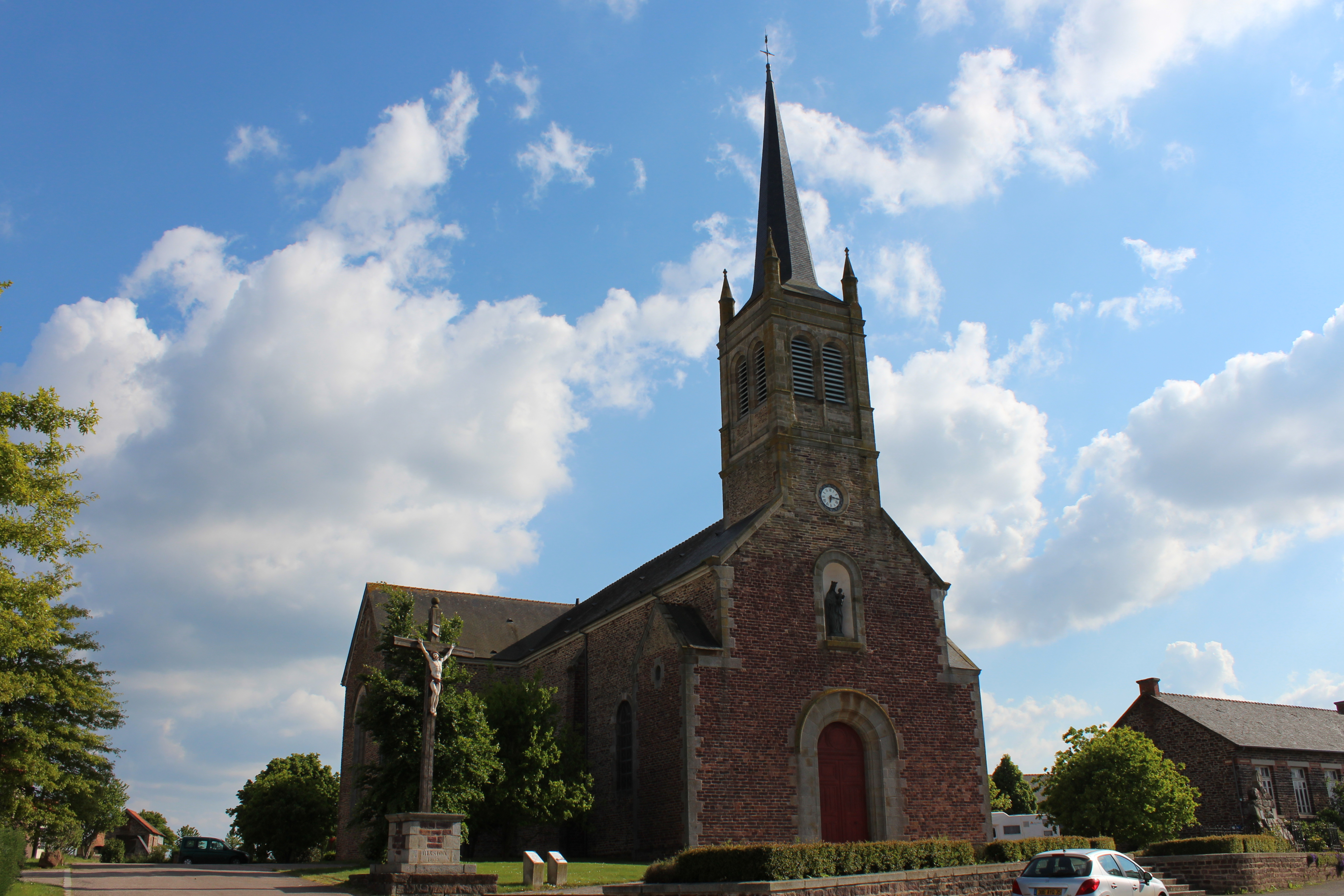
- The church of Notre-Dame
- Location of Muel
- Location within France Location within Brittany
- Coordinates: 48°07′41″N 2°09′21″W
- Country: France
- Region: Brittany
- Department: Ille-et-Vilaine
- Arrondissement: Rennes
- Canton: Montauban-de-Bretagne
- Intercommunality: Saint-Méen Montauban

Government
  - Mayor (2020–2026): Patrick Chenais
- Area^{1}: 28.90 km^{2} (11.16 sq mi)
- Highest elevation: 133 m (436 ft)
- Lowest elevation: 45 m (148 ft)
- Population (2023): 927
  - Density: 32.1/km^{2} (83.1/sq mi)
- Time zone: UTC+01:00 (CET)
  - Summer (DST): UTC+02:00 (CEST)
- INSEE/Postal code: 35201 /35290
- ^{1} French Land Register data, which excludes lakes, ponds, glaciers > 1 km^{2} (0.386 sq mi or 247 acres) and river estuaries.

Muel (French pronunciation: [mɥɛl]; Breton: Moel; Gallo: Muèu) is a commune in the Ille-et-Vilaine department in Brittany in northwestern France.

== Geography ==
The river Meu flows from west to east through the commune.

== Population ==
Historical population
Year	Pop.	±% p.a.
1968	928	—
1975	803	−2.05%
1982	709	−1.76%
1990	653	−1.02%
1999	648	−0.09%
2007	779	+2.33%
2012	859	+1.97%
2017	894	+0.80%
2023	927	+0.61%
Source: INSEE

== See also ==
- Communes of the Ille-et-Vilaine department
