= René-Jean de Botherel du Plessis =

French counter-revolutionary

René-Jean de Botherel du Plessis (1745–1805) was a French counter-revolutionary.

In 1786 he was appointed attorney general syndic of the Estates of Brittany.
