= Saint-Onen-la-Chapelle =

Saint-Onen-la-Chapelle Santez-Onenn (Breton)
- Commune
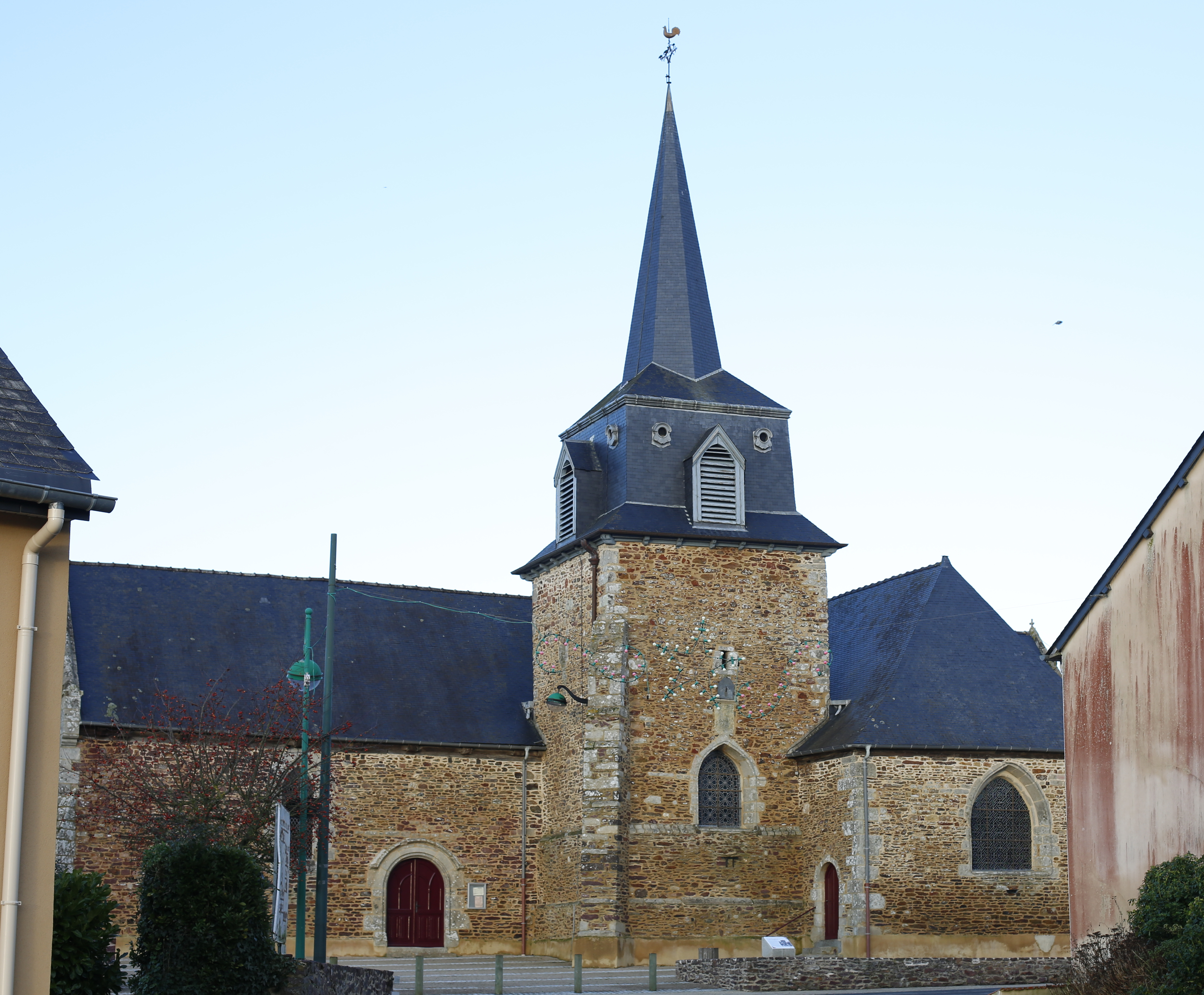
- The church of Saint-Onen

- Coat of arms
- Location of Saint-Onen-la-Chapelle
- Location within France Location within Brittany
- Coordinates: 48°10′40″N 2°10′18″W
- Country: France
- Region: Brittany
- Department: Ille-et-Vilaine
- Arrondissement: Rennes
- Canton: Montauban-de-Bretagne
- Intercommunality: Saint-Méen Montauban

Government
  - Mayor (2020–2026): Jean-François Bohanne
- Area^{1}: 24.73 km^{2} (9.55 sq mi)
- Highest elevation: 114 m (374 ft)
- Lowest elevation: 57 m (187 ft)
- Population (2023): 1,126
  - Density: 45.53/km^{2} (117.9/sq mi)
- Time zone: UTC+01:00 (CET)
  - Summer (DST): UTC+02:00 (CEST)
- INSEE/Postal code: 35302 /35290
- ^{1} French Land Register data, which excludes lakes, ponds, glaciers > 1 km^{2} (0.386 sq mi or 247 acres) and river estuaries.

Saint-Onen-la-Chapelle (French pronunciation: [sɛ̃.t‿ɔnɛ̃ la ʃapɛl]; Breton: Santez-Onenn) is a commune in the Ille-et-Vilaine department in Brittany in northwestern France.

== Population ==
Inhabitants of Saint-Onen-la-Chapelle are called onenais in French.

Historical population
| Year | Pop. | ±% p.a. |
|---|---|---|
| 1968 | 803 | — |
| 1975 | 762 | −0.75% |
| 1982 | 667 | −1.88% |
| 1990 | 713 | +0.84% |
| 1999 | 784 | +1.06% |
| 2007 | 973 | +2.74% |
| 2012 | 1,157 | +3.52% |
| 2017 | 1,143 | −0.24% |
| 2023 | 1,126 | −0.25% |
Source: INSEE

== See also ==
- Communes of the Ille-et-Vilaine department
