= Canton of Montauban-de-Bretagne =

Coordinates: 48.20°N 2.05°W

Montauban-de-Bretagne
- Canton
- Interactive map of Montauban-de-Bretagne
- Country: France
- Region: Brittany
- Department: Ille-et-Vilaine
- No. of communes: {{{nbcomm}}}

Government
  - Representatives (2021–2028): Charlotte Faillé; Jean-François Bohanne
- Area: 417.64 km^{2} (161.25 sq mi)
- Population (2023): 35,488
  - Density: 84.973/km^{2} (220.08/sq mi)
- INSEE code: 35 15

The canton of Montauban-de-Bretagne is an administrative division of the Ille-et-Vilaine department, in northwestern France. At the French canton reorganisation which came into effect in March 2015, it was expanded from 8 to 24 communes (4 of which were merged into the new communes La Chapelle-du-Lou-du-Lac and Montauban-de-Bretagne). Its seat is in Montauban-de-Bretagne.

== Composition ==
It consists of the following communes:

1. Bécherel
2. Bléruais
3. Boisgervilly
4. La Chapelle-Chaussée
5. La Chapelle-du-Lou-du-Lac
6. Le Crouais
7. Gaël
8. Irodouër
9. Landujan
10. Langan
11. Médréac
12. Miniac-sous-Bécherel
13. Montauban-de-Bretagne
14. Muel
15. Quédillac
16. Romillé
17. Saint-Malon-sur-Mel
18. Saint-Maugan
19. Saint-Méen-le-Grand
20. Saint-Onen-la-Chapelle
21. Saint-Pern
22. Saint-Uniac

== Councillors ==
Election	Councillors	Party	Occupation
2015	Marie Daugan	UMP	Former Mayor of Saint-M'Hervon
2015	Pierre Guitton	DVD	Mayor of Saint-Méen-le-Grand

== Pictures of the canton ==
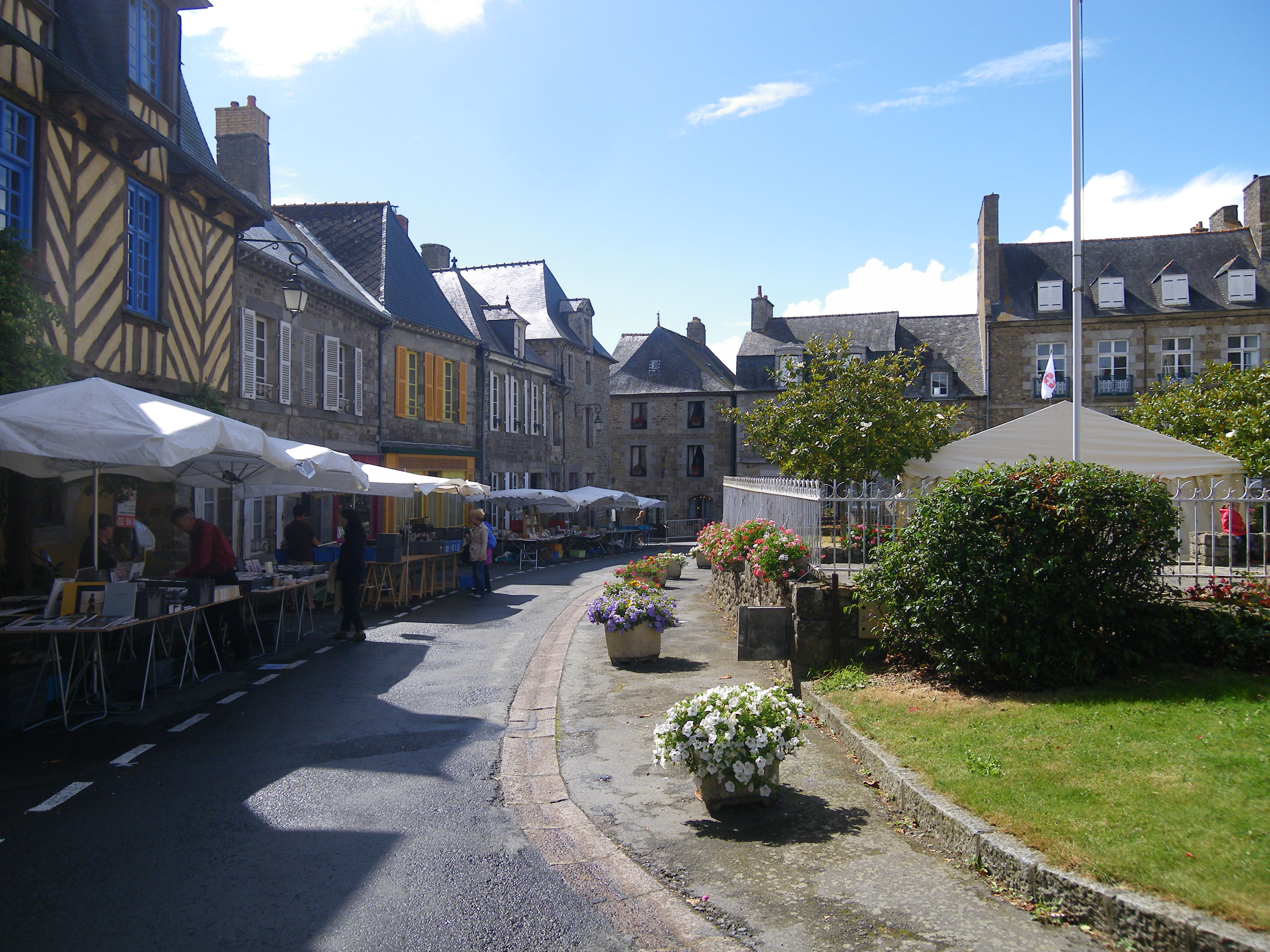
Bécherel's street

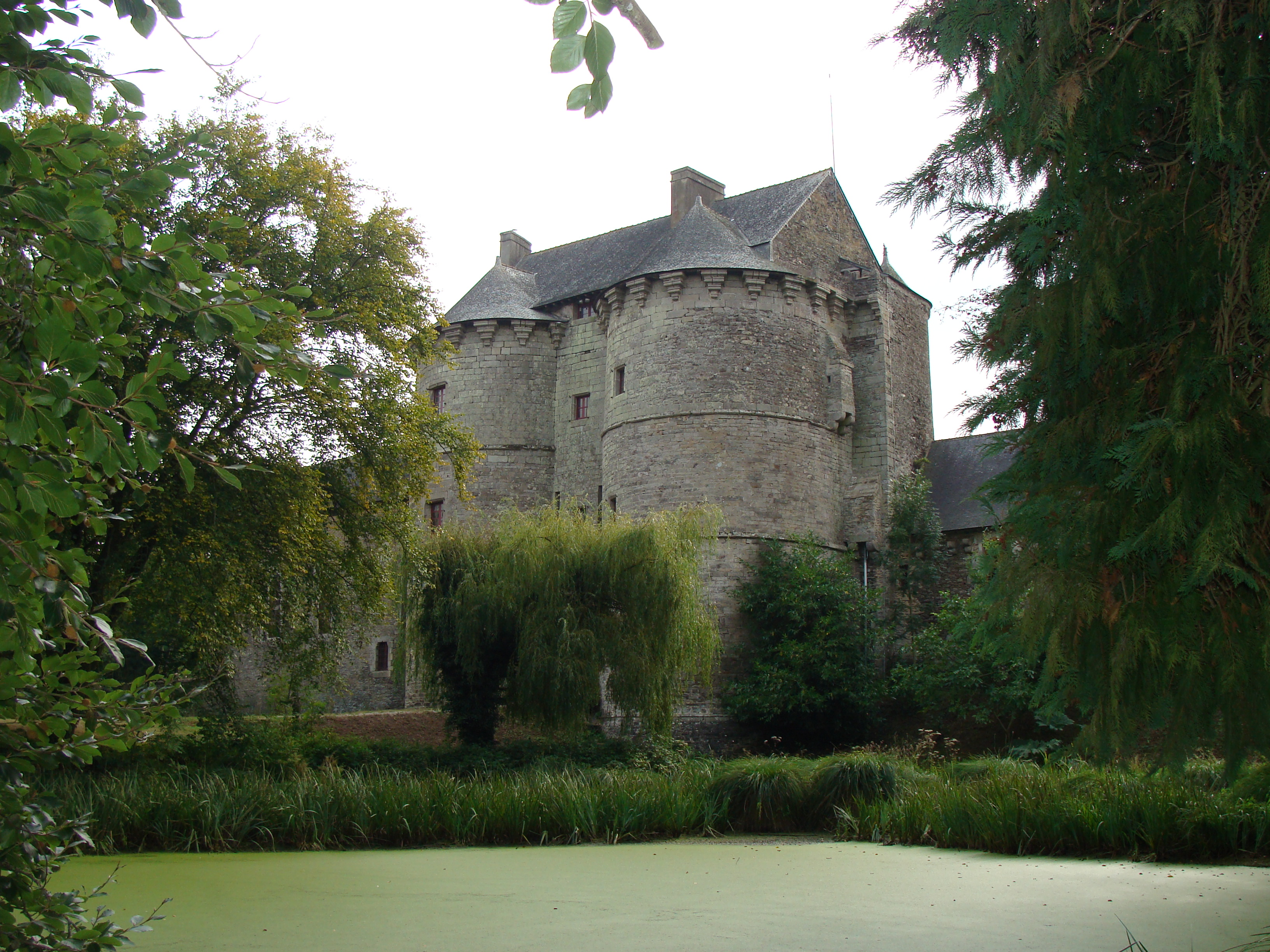
Montauban-de-Bretagne's castle

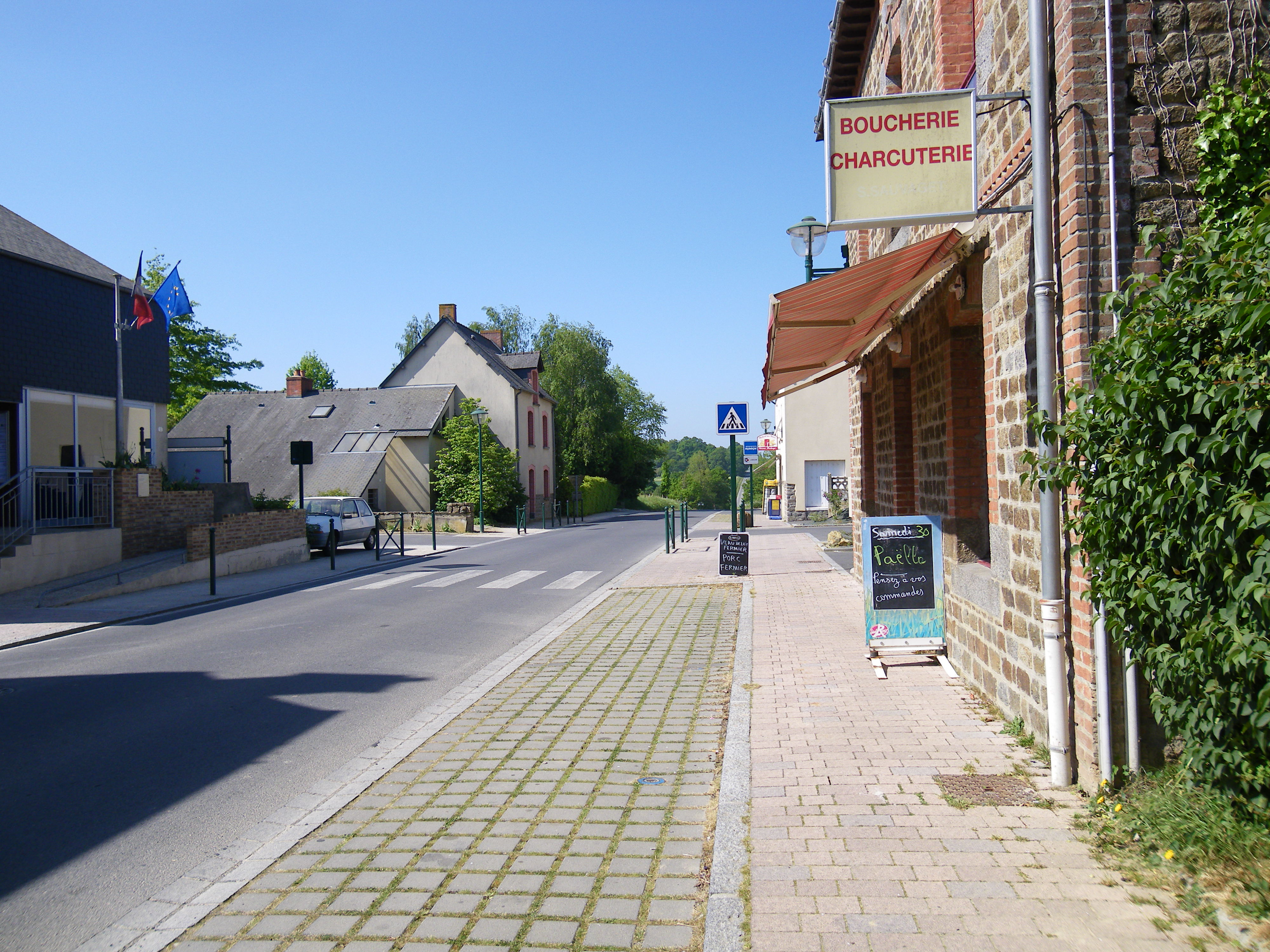
Langan's street
