= Saint-Germain-sur-Ille =

Saint-Germain-sur-Ille Saent-Jermaen-sur-Ill (Gallo) Sant-Jermen-an-Il (Breton)
- Commune
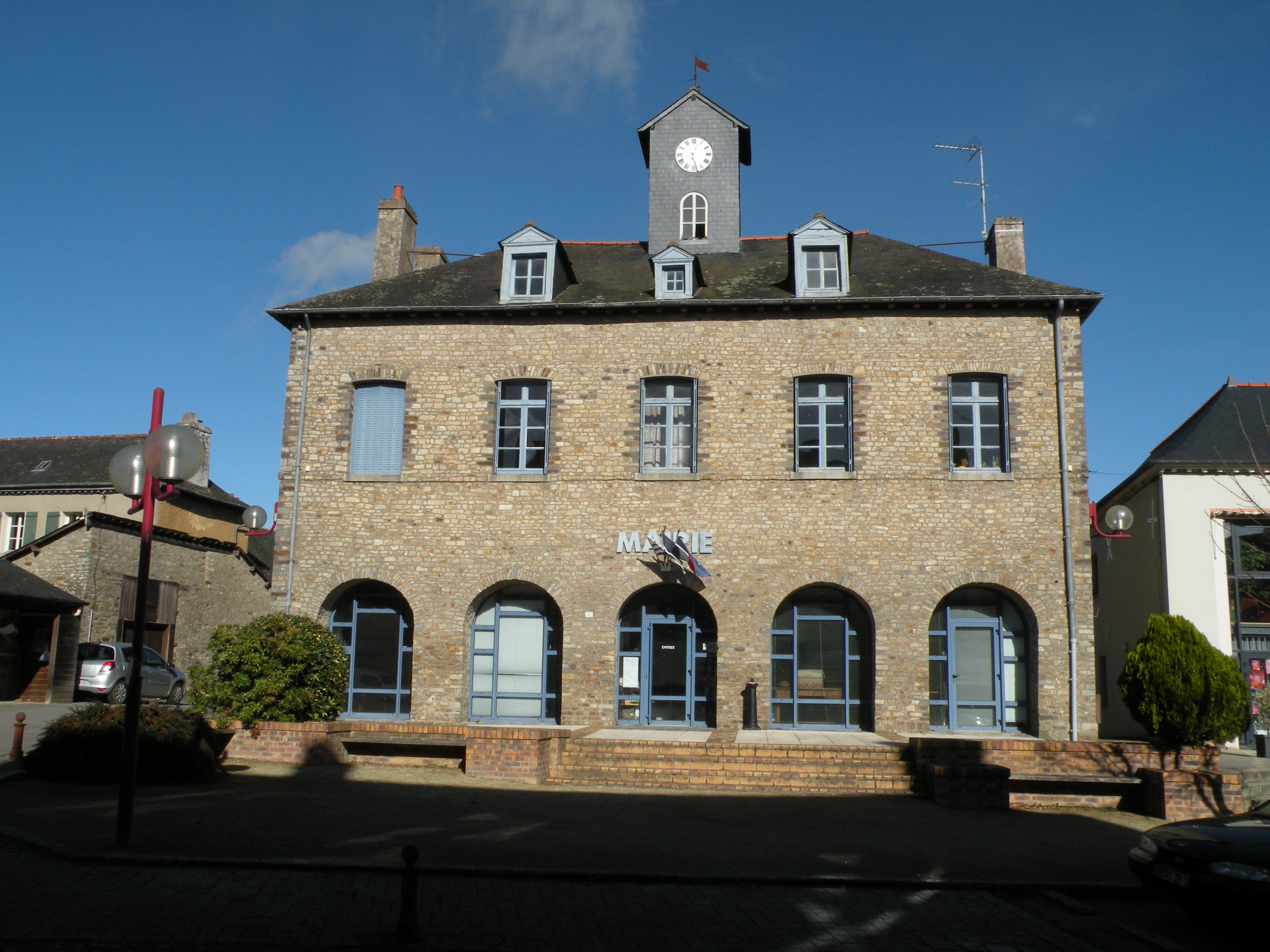
- The town hall of Saint-Germain-sur-Ille

- Coat of arms
- Location of Saint-Germain-sur-Ille
- Location within France Location within Brittany
- Coordinates: 48°14′59″N 1°39′29″W
- Country: France
- Region: Brittany
- Department: Ille-et-Vilaine
- Arrondissement: Rennes
- Canton: Melesse
- Intercommunality: Val d'Ille-Aubigné

Government
  - Mayor (2020–2026): Bertrand Legendre
- Area^{1}: 3.90 km^{2} (1.51 sq mi)
- Highest elevation: 100 m (330 ft)
- Lowest elevation: 37 m (121 ft)
- Population (2023): 1,017
  - Density: 261/km^{2} (675/sq mi)
- Time zone: UTC+01:00 (CET)
  - Summer (DST): UTC+02:00 (CEST)
- INSEE/Postal code: 35274 /35250
- ^{1} French Land Register data, which excludes lakes, ponds, glaciers > 1 km^{2} (0.386 sq mi or 247 acres) and river estuaries.

Saint-Germain-sur-Ille (French pronunciation: [sɛ̃ ʒɛʁmɛ̃ syʁ il], literally Saint-Germain on Ille; Gallo: Saent-Jermaen-sur-Ill, Breton: Sant-Jermen-an-Il) is a commune in the Ille-et-Vilaine department of Brittany in northwestern France.

== Population ==
Inhabitants of Saint-Germain-sur-Ille are called germinois in French.

Historical population
Year	Pop.	±% p.a.
1968	536	—
1975	568	+0.83%
1982	649	+1.92%
1990	693	+0.82%
1999	725	+0.50%
2007	889	+2.58%
2012	875	−0.32%
2017	925	+1.12%
2023	1,017	+1.59%
Source: INSEE

== See also ==
- Communes of the Ille-et-Vilaine department
