= Saint-Médard-sur-Ille =

Saint-Médard-sur-Ille Saent-Médart (Gallo) Sant-Marzh-an-Il (Breton)
- Commune
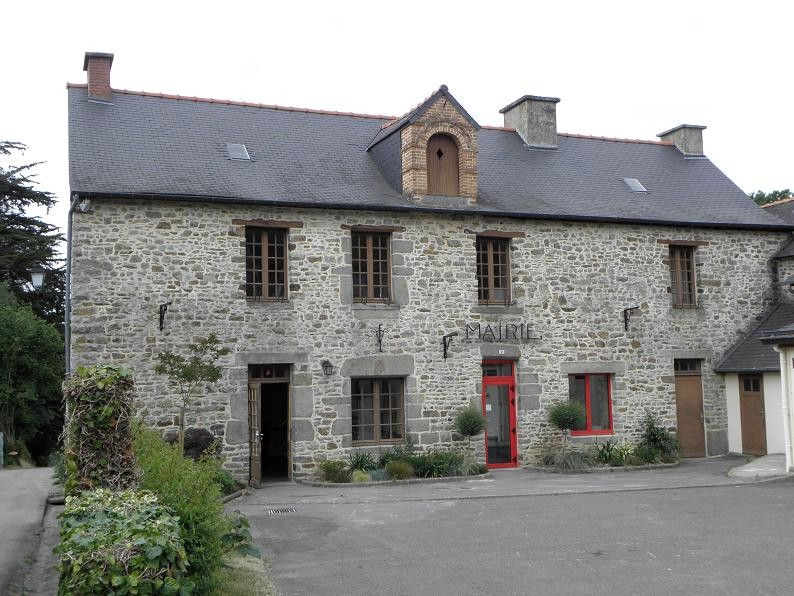
- The town hall of Saint-Médard-sur-Ille

- Coat of arms
- Location of Saint-Médard-sur-Ille
- Location within France Location within Brittany
- Coordinates: 48°16′25″N 1°39′30″W
- Country: France
- Region: Brittany
- Department: Ille-et-Vilaine
- Arrondissement: Rennes
- Canton: Melesse
- Intercommunality: Val d'Ille-Aubigné

Government
  - Mayor (2020–2026): Noël Bournonville
- Area^{1}: 18.22 km^{2} (7.03 sq mi)
- Highest elevation: 115 m (377 ft)
- Lowest elevation: 44 m (144 ft)
- Population (2023): 1,377
  - Density: 75.58/km^{2} (195.7/sq mi)
- Time zone: UTC+01:00 (CET)
  - Summer (DST): UTC+02:00 (CEST)
- INSEE/Postal code: 35296 /35250
- ^{1} French Land Register data, which excludes lakes, ponds, glaciers > 1 km^{2} (0.386 sq mi or 247 acres) and river estuaries.

Saint-Médard-sur-Ille (French pronunciation: [sɛ̃ medaʁ syʁ il], literally Saint-Médard on Ille; Gallo: Saent-Médart, Breton: Sant-Marzh-an-Il) is a commune in the Ille-et-Vilaine department in Brittany in northwestern France.

== Population ==
Inhabitants of Saint-Médard-sur-Ille are called médardais in French.

Historical population
Year	Pop.	±% p.a.
1968	736	—
1975	753	+0.33%
1982	1,002	+4.17%
1990	1,040	+0.47%
1999	1,154	+1.16%
2007	1,292	+1.42%
2012	1,331	+0.60%
2017	1,287	−0.67%
2023	1,377	+1.13%
Source: INSEE

== See also ==
- Communes of the Ille-et-Vilaine department
