= Serge Lindier =

French designer and comic book artist (1951–2019)

- Born: 21 December 1951; Montreuil-sur-Ille, France
- Died: 29 November 2019 (aged 67); Rennes, France
- Occupations: Designer; Comic book artist

Serge Lindier (21 December 1951 – 29 November 2019) was a French designer and comic book artist. He was the author of the comic book series Alan.

== Biography ==
Serge was born on 21 December 1951 in Montreuil-sur-Ille, France.

Lindier worked in advertising for nearly 25 years before he returned to Brittany and began working on comics. He was the author of the comic book series Alan, which consisted of five volumes and had its first volume published in 2000. After collaborating with Samuel Bouquet for the fifth volume of Alan, they both worked on a series called Malo: La tombe de l'aïeul, published in 2013. The volume sold approximately 3000 copies.

He died on 29 November 2019 in Rennes, France at the age of 67.
