= Saint-Symphorien, Ille-et-Vilaine =

Commune in Brittany, France

Saint-Symphorien Sant-Sinforian (Breton)
- Commune
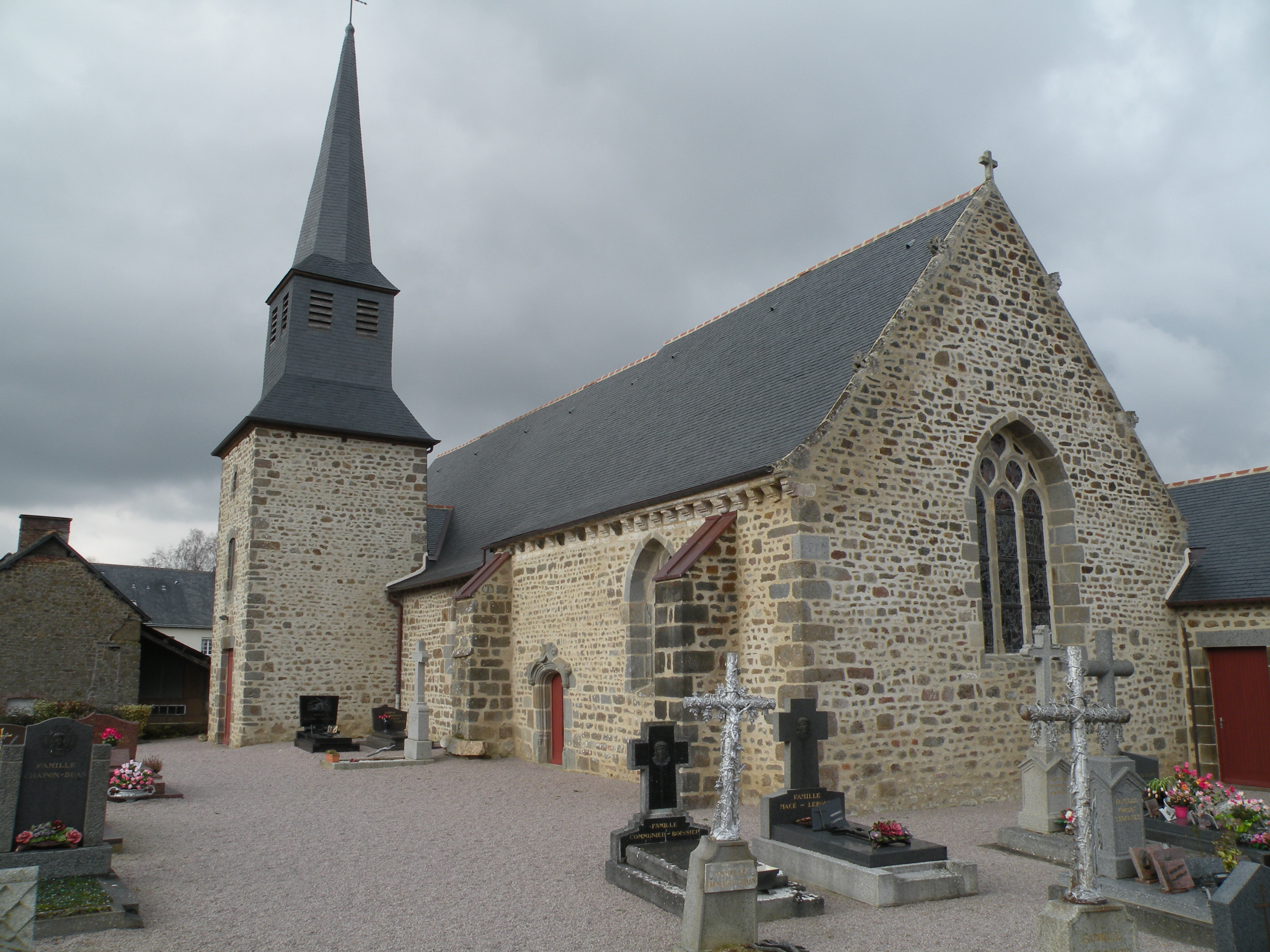
- The church of Saint-Symphorien
- Location of Saint-Symphorien
- Location within France Location within Brittany
- Coordinates: 48°17′30″N 1°49′29″W
- Country: France
- Region: Brittany
- Department: Ille-et-Vilaine
- Arrondissement: Rennes
- Canton: Melesse
- Intercommunality: Val d'Ille-Aubigné

Government
  - Mayor (2020–2026): Yves Desmidt
- Area^{1}: 7.5 km^{2} (2.9 sq mi)
- Highest elevation: 122 m (400 ft)
- Lowest elevation: 51 m (167 ft)
- Population (2023): 625
  - Density: 83/km^{2} (220/sq mi)
- Time zone: UTC+01:00 (CET)
  - Summer (DST): UTC+02:00 (CEST)
- INSEE/Postal code: 35317 /
- ^{1} French Land Register data, which excludes lakes, ponds, glaciers > 1 km^{2} (0.386 sq mi or 247 acres) and river estuaries.

Saint-Symphorien (French pronunciation: [sɛ̃ sɛ̃fɔʁjɛ̃]; Breton: Sant-Sinforian) is a commune in the Ille-et-Vilaine department in Brittany in northwestern France.

Saint-Symphorien was part of Hédé from 1973 to 2007. On 1 January 2008, the commune of Hédé was divided again and the commune was recreated.

== Population ==
Historical population
Year	Pop.	±% p.a.
1968	349	—
1975	305	−1.91%
1982	343	+1.69%
1990	319	−0.90%
1999	416	+2.99%
2007	518	+2.78%
2012	606	+3.19%
2017	603	−0.10%
2023	625	+0.60%
Source: INSEE

== See also ==
- Communes of the Ille-et-Vilaine department
