= Saint-Gondran =

Saint-Gondran Sant-Gondran (Breton)
- Commune
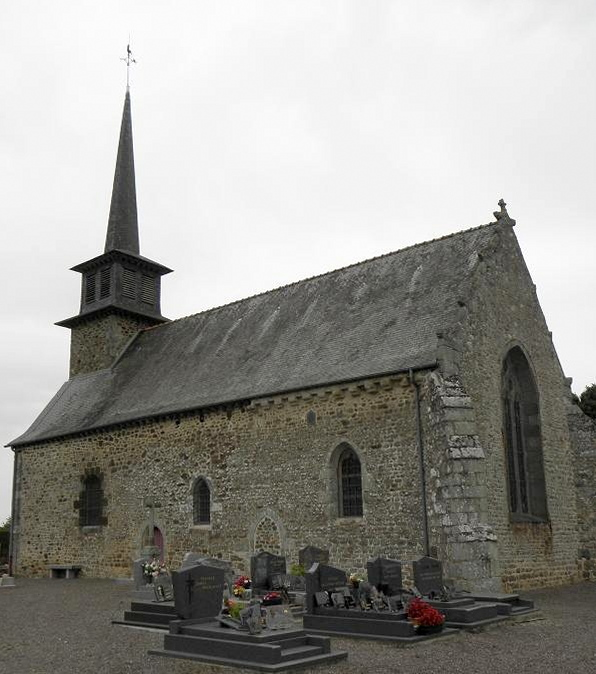
- The parish church of Saint-Gondran

- Coat of arms
- Location of Saint-Gondran
- Location within France Location within Brittany
- Coordinates: 48°16′04″N 1°50′04″W
- Country: France
- Region: Brittany
- Department: Ille-et-Vilaine
- Arrondissement: Rennes
- Canton: Melesse
- Intercommunality: Val d'Ille-Aubigné

Government
  - Mayor (2020–2026): Yannick Lariviere-Gillet
- Area^{1}: 4.40 km^{2} (1.70 sq mi)
- Highest elevation: 121 m (397 ft)
- Lowest elevation: 80 m (260 ft)
- Population (2023): 651
  - Density: 148/km^{2} (383/sq mi)
- Time zone: UTC+01:00 (CET)
  - Summer (DST): UTC+02:00 (CEST)
- INSEE/Postal code: 35276 /35630
- ^{1} French Land Register data, which excludes lakes, ponds, glaciers > 1 km^{2} (0.386 sq mi or 247 acres) and river estuaries.

Saint-Gondran (French pronunciation: [sɛ̃ ɡɔ̃dʁɑ̃]; Breton: Sant-Gondran) is a commune in the Ille-et-Vilaine department in Brittany in northwestern France.

== Population ==
Inhabitants of Saint-Gondran are called Gondranais in French.

Historical population
Year	Pop.	±% p.a.
1968	204	—
1975	215	+0.75%
1982	338	+6.68%
1990	378	+1.41%
1999	464	+2.30%
2007	510	+1.19%
2012	514	+0.16%
2017	537	+0.88%
2023	651	+3.26%
Source: INSEE

== See also ==
- Communes of the Ille-et-Vilaine department
