= Clayes =

Clayes Claès (Gallo) Kloued (Breton)
- Commune
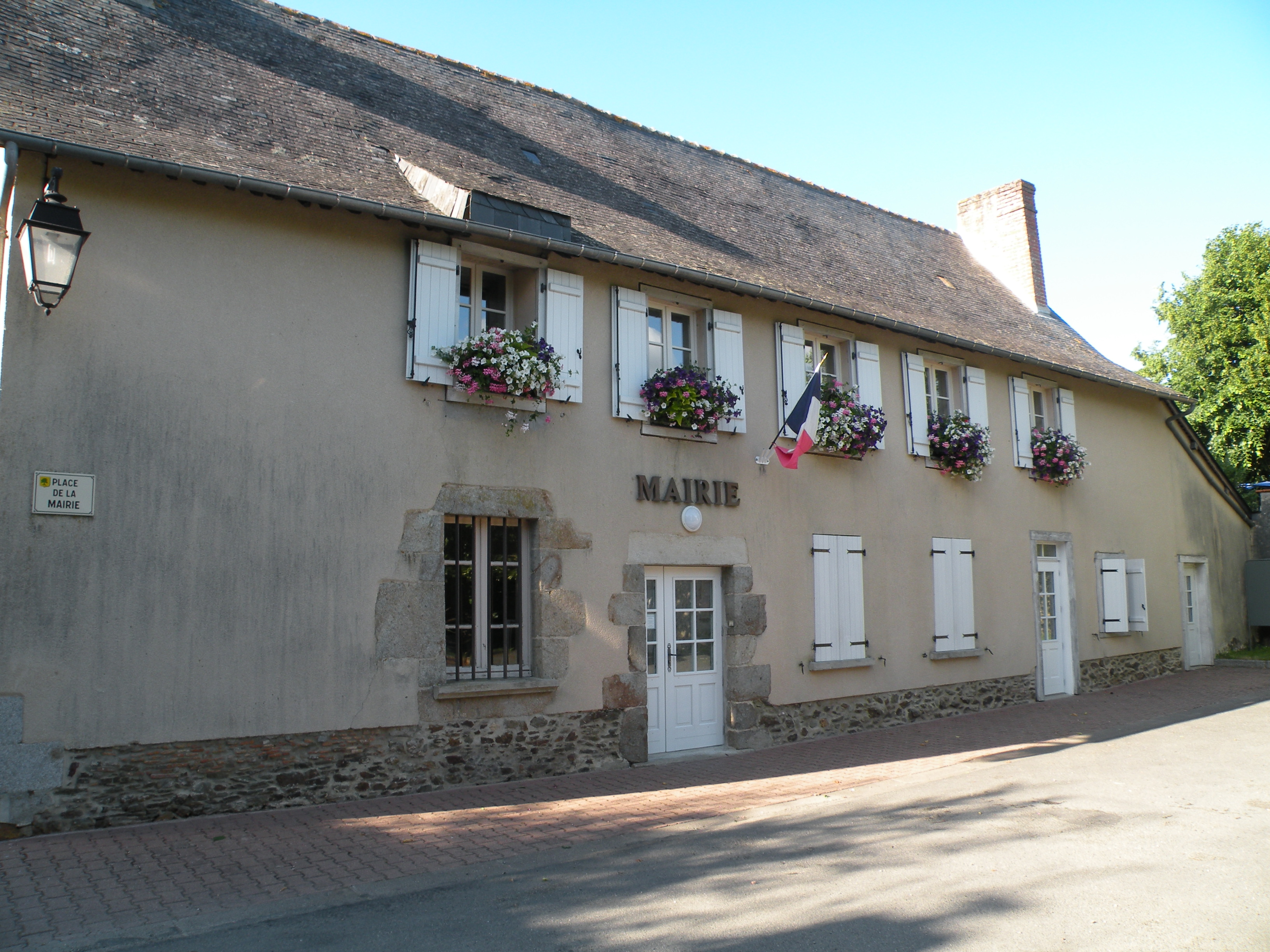
- Town hall

- Coat of arms
- Location of Clayes
- Location within France Location within Brittany
- Coordinates: 48°10′39″N 1°51′05″W
- Country: France
- Region: Brittany
- Department: Ille-et-Vilaine
- Arrondissement: Rennes
- Canton: Melesse
- Intercommunality: Rennes Métropole

Government
  - Mayor (2020–2026): Philippe Sicot
- Area^{1}: 4.28 km^{2} (1.65 sq mi)
- Highest elevation: 109 m (358 ft)
- Lowest elevation: 65 m (213 ft)
- Population (2023): 947
  - Density: 221/km^{2} (573/sq mi)
- Time zone: UTC+01:00 (CET)
  - Summer (DST): UTC+02:00 (CEST)
- INSEE/Postal code: 35081 /35590
- ^{1} French Land Register data, which excludes lakes, ponds, glaciers > 1 km^{2} (0.386 sq mi or 247 acres) and river estuaries.

Clayes (French pronunciation: [klɛ]; Breton: Kloued; Gallo: Claès) is a commune in the Ille-et-Vilaine department in Brittany in northwestern France.

== Population ==
Inhabitants of Clayes are called Clayens in French.

Historical population
Year	Pop.	±% p.a.
1968	178	—
1975	256	+5.33%
1982	403	+6.70%
1990	401	−0.06%
1999	459	+1.51%
2007	725	+5.88%
2012	668	−1.62%
2017	904	+6.24%
2023	947	+0.78%
Source: INSEE

== See also ==
- Communes of the Ille-et-Vilaine department
