= Langouet =

Langouet Langouët (Gallo) Langoed (Breton)
- Commune
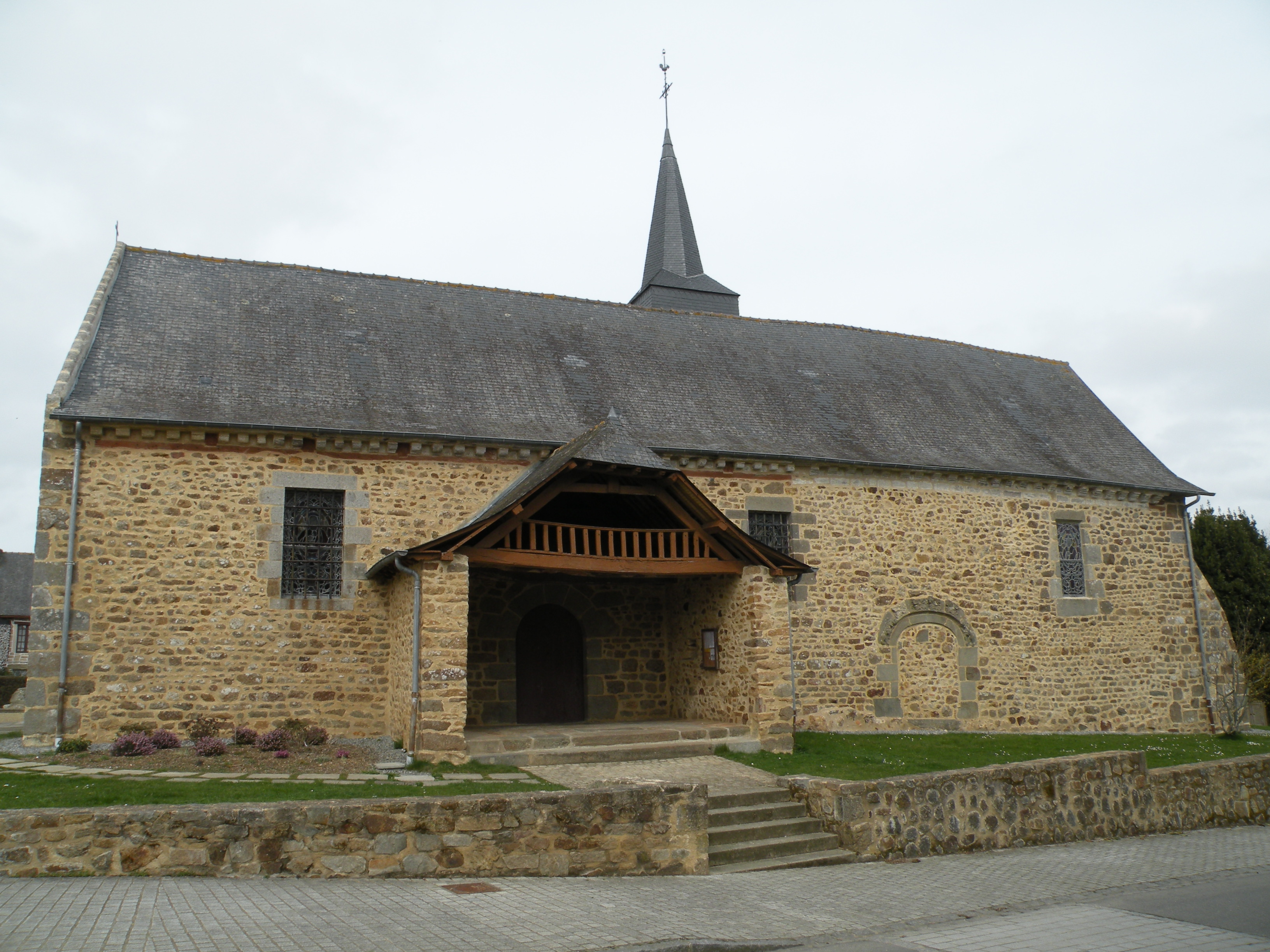
- Saint-Armel church
- Location of Langouet
- Location within France Location within Brittany
- Coordinates: 48°15′02″N 1°49′19″W
- Country: France
- Region: Brittany
- Department: Ille-et-Vilaine
- Arrondissement: Rennes
- Canton: Melesse
- Intercommunality: Val d'Ille-Aubigné

Government
  - Mayor (2020–2026): Jean-Luc Dubois
- Area^{1}: 6.99 km^{2} (2.70 sq mi)
- Highest elevation: 121 m (397 ft)
- Lowest elevation: 71 m (233 ft)
- Population (2023): 604
  - Density: 86.4/km^{2} (224/sq mi)
- Time zone: UTC+01:00 (CET)
  - Summer (DST): UTC+02:00 (CEST)
- INSEE/Postal code: 35146 /35630
- ^{1} French Land Register data, which excludes lakes, ponds, glaciers > 1 km^{2} (0.386 sq mi or 247 acres) and river estuaries.

Langouet (French pronunciation: [lɑ̃ɡwɛt]; Gallo: Langouët, Breton: Langoed) is a commune in the Ille-et-Vilaine department of Brittany in northwestern France.

== Population ==
Inhabitants of Langouet are called Langouëtiens in French.

Historical population
Year	Pop.	±% p.a.
1968	278	—
1975	317	+1.89%
1982	418	+4.03%
1990	454	+1.04%
1999	537	+1.88%
2007	544	+0.16%
2012	579	+1.25%
2017	601	+0.75%
2023	604	+0.08%
Source: INSEE

== See also ==
- Communes of the Ille-et-Vilaine department
