= Montreuil-le-Gast =

Montreuil-le-Gast Montroelh-le-Gast (Gallo) Mousterel-ar-Gwast (Breton)
- Commune
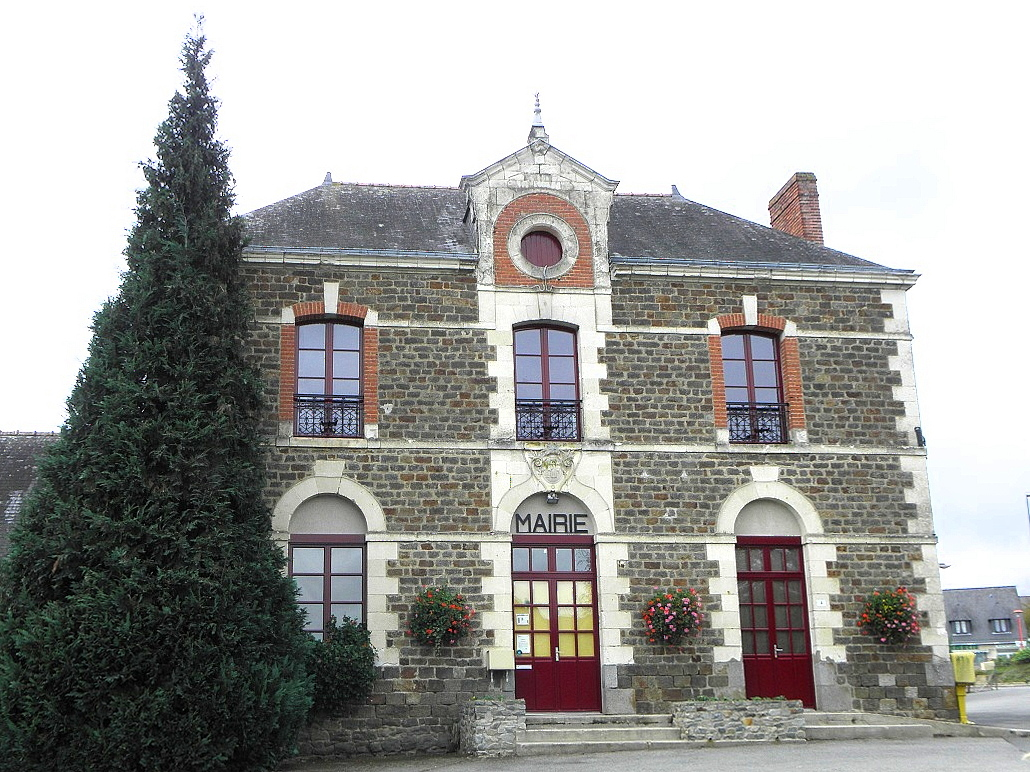
- The town hall of Montreuil-le-Gast
- Location of Montreuil-le-Gast
- Location within France Location within Brittany
- Coordinates: 48°14′52″N 1°43′32″W
- Country: France
- Region: Brittany
- Department: Ille-et-Vilaine
- Arrondissement: Rennes
- Canton: Melesse
- Intercommunality: Val d'Ille-Aubigné

Government
  - Mayor (2020–2026): Lionel Henry
- Area^{1}: 9.14 km^{2} (3.53 sq mi)
- Highest elevation: 122 m (400 ft)
- Lowest elevation: 65 m (213 ft)
- Population (2023): 2,080
  - Density: 228/km^{2} (589/sq mi)
- Time zone: UTC+01:00 (CET)
  - Summer (DST): UTC+02:00 (CEST)
- INSEE/Postal code: 35193 /35520
- ^{1} French Land Register data, which excludes lakes, ponds, glaciers > 1 km^{2} (0.386 sq mi or 247 acres) and river estuaries.

Montreuil-le-Gast (French pronunciation: [mɔ̃tʁœj lə ɡa]; Breton: Mousterel-ar-Gwast; Gallo: Montroelh-le-Gast) is a commune in the Ille-et-Vilaine department of Brittany in northwestern France.

== Population ==
Inhabitants of Montreuil-le-Gast are called in French montreuillais.

Historical population
Year	Pop.	±% p.a.
1968	513	—
1975	801	+6.57%
1982	1,136	+5.12%
1990	1,580	+4.21%
1999	1,604	+0.17%
2007	1,931	+2.35%
2012	1,904	−0.28%
2017	1,936	+0.33%
2023	2,080	+1.20%
Source: INSEE

== See also ==
- Communes of the Ille-et-Vilaine department
