= Hédé-Bazouges =

Hédé-Bazouges Hédoe (Gallo) Hazhoù-Bazeleg (Breton)
- Commune
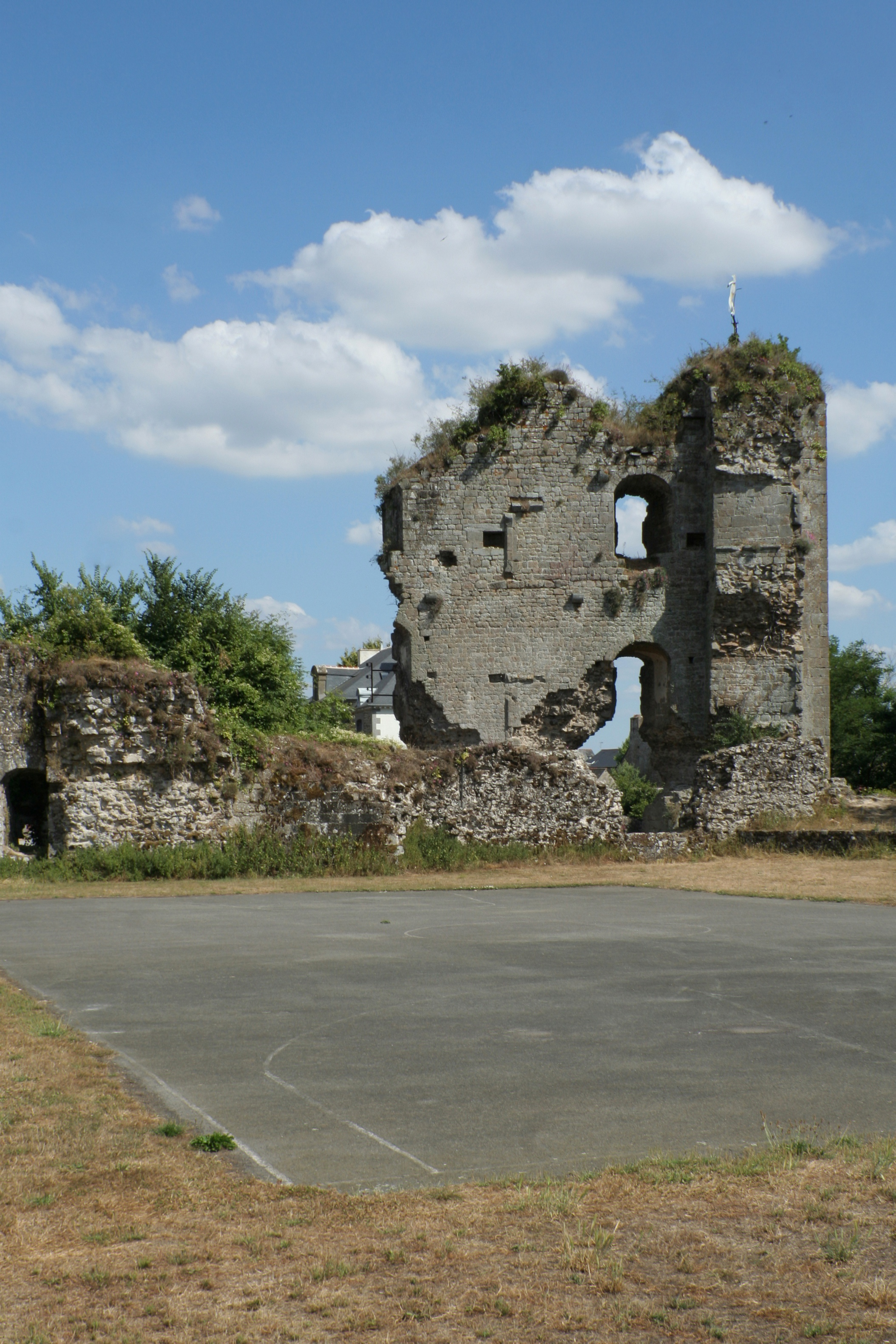
- Ruined castle

- Coat of arms
- Location of Hédé-Bazouges
- Location within France Location within Brittany
- Coordinates: 48°17′43″N 1°48′05″W
- Country: France
- Region: Brittany
- Department: Ille-et-Vilaine
- Arrondissement: Rennes
- Canton: Melesse
- Intercommunality: Bretagne Romantique

Government
  - Mayor (2021–2026): Isabelle Clément-Vitoria
- Area^{1}: 14.93 km^{2} (5.76 sq mi)
- Highest elevation: 122 m (400 ft)
- Lowest elevation: 39 m (128 ft)
- Population (2023): 2,267
  - Density: 151.8/km^{2} (393.3/sq mi)
- Time zone: UTC+01:00 (CET)
  - Summer (DST): UTC+02:00 (CEST)
- INSEE/Postal code: 35130 /35630
- ^{1} French Land Register data, which excludes lakes, ponds, glaciers > 1 km^{2} (0.386 sq mi or 247 acres) and river estuaries.

Hédé-Bazouges (French pronunciation: [ede bazuʒ]; Breton: Hazhoù-Bazeleg; Gallo: Hédoe) is a commune in the Ille-et-Vilaine department in Brittany in northwestern France.

== History ==
The commune was created in 1974 by the merger of three former communes: Hédé, Bazouges-sous-Hédé and Saint-Symphorien. On 1 January 2008, the village of Saint-Symphorien was separated from the commune, and given the status of commune in its own right. Prior to 22 March 2011, the commune was called Hédé.

It is twinned with the village of Wortham in Suffolk, England.

== Population ==
Inhabitants of Hédé-Bazouges are called Hédéens in French.

Historical population
Year	Pop.	±% p.a.
1968	1,206	—
1975	1,127	−0.96%
1982	1,079	−0.62%
1990	1,181	+1.14%
1999	1,406	+1.96%
2007	1,754	+2.80%
2012	2,094	+3.61%
2017	2,247	+1.42%
2023	2,267	+0.15%
Populations of the area corresponding with the commune of Hédé-Bazouges at 1 January 2025. Source: INSEE

== Sights ==
The town has a sculpture park in the church garden dedicated to the work of local resident Jean Boucher.

== See also ==
- Communes of the Ille-et-Vilaine department
- Jean-Marie Valentin
