= Guipel =

Guipel Gipèu (Gallo) Gwipedel (Breton)
- Commune
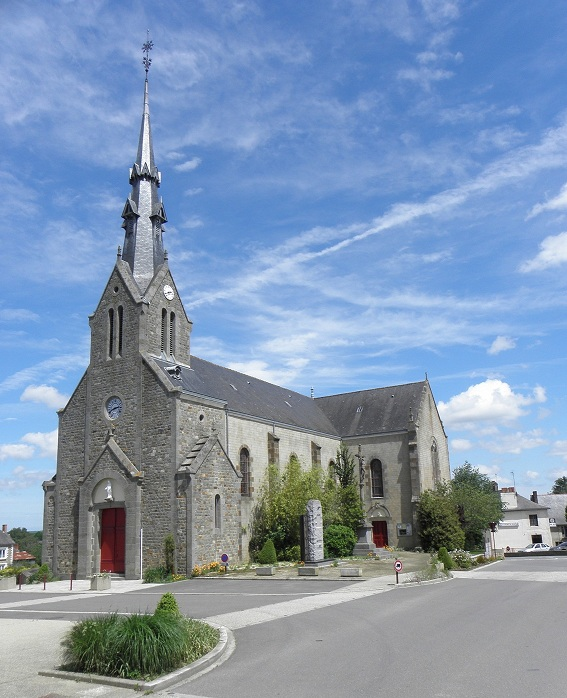
- The church of Saint-Martin, in Guipel
- Location of Guipel
- Location within France Location within Brittany
- Coordinates: 48°17′57″N 1°43′12″W
- Country: France
- Region: Brittany
- Department: Ille-et-Vilaine
- Arrondissement: Rennes
- Canton: Melesse
- Intercommunality: Val d'Ille-Aubigné

Government
  - Mayor (2020–2026): Isabelle Joucan
- Area^{1}: 25.11 km^{2} (9.70 sq mi)
- Highest elevation: 113 m (371 ft)
- Lowest elevation: 58 m (190 ft)
- Population (2023): 1,738
  - Density: 69.22/km^{2} (179.3/sq mi)
- Time zone: UTC+01:00 (CET)
  - Summer (DST): UTC+02:00 (CEST)
- INSEE/Postal code: 35128 /35440
- ^{1} French Land Register data, which excludes lakes, ponds, glaciers > 1 km^{2} (0.386 sq mi or 247 acres) and river estuaries.

Guipel (French pronunciation: [ɡipɛl]; Breton: Gwipedel; Gallo: Gipèu) is a commune in the Ille-et-Vilaine department in Brittany in northwestern France.

== Population ==
Inhabitants of Guipel are called Guipellois in French.

Historical population
Year	Pop.	±% p.a.
1968	1,126	—
1975	1,071	−0.71%
1982	1,190	+1.52%
1990	1,283	+0.95%
1999	1,420	+1.13%
2007	1,562	+1.20%
2012	1,690	+1.59%
2017	1,696	+0.07%
2023	1,738	+0.41%
Source: INSEE
