= Parthenay-de-Bretagne =

Parthenay-de-Bretagne Parzheneg (Breton)
- Commune
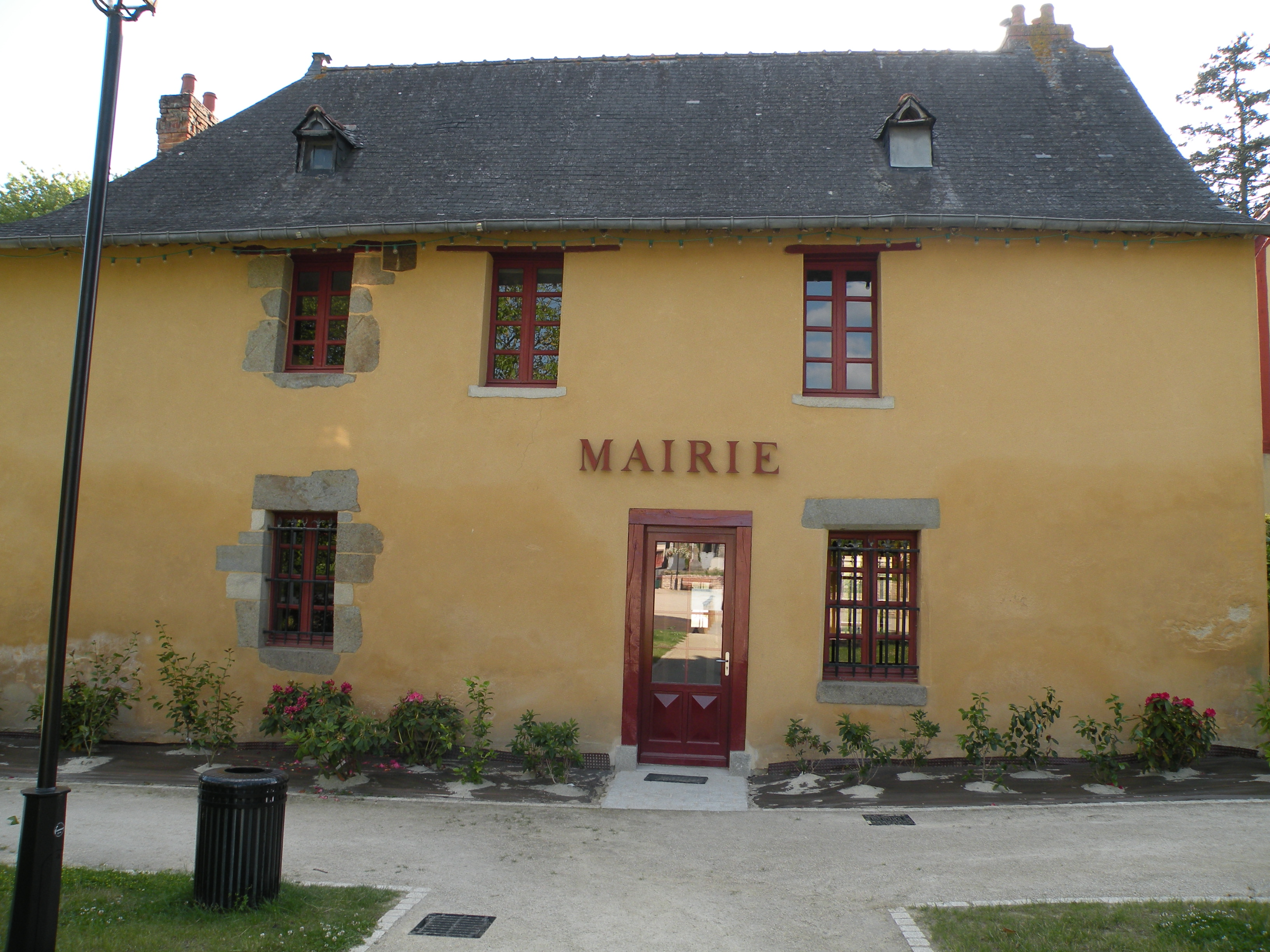
- The town hall of Parthenay-de-Bretagne

- Coat of arms
- Location of Parthenay-de-Bretagne
- Location within France Location within Brittany
- Coordinates: 48°11′34″N 1°49′37″W
- Country: France
- Region: Brittany
- Department: Ille-et-Vilaine
- Arrondissement: Rennes
- Canton: Melesse
- Intercommunality: Rennes Métropole

Government
  - Mayor (2020–2026): Khalil Bettal
- Area^{1}: 4.80 km^{2} (1.85 sq mi)
- Highest elevation: 107 m (351 ft)
- Lowest elevation: 62 m (203 ft)
- Population (2023): 1,793
  - Density: 374/km^{2} (967/sq mi)
- Time zone: UTC+01:00 (CET)
  - Summer (DST): UTC+02:00 (CEST)
- INSEE/Postal code: 35216 /35850
- ^{1} French Land Register data, which excludes lakes, ponds, glaciers > 1 km^{2} (0.386 sq mi or 247 acres) and river estuaries.

Parthenay-de-Bretagne (French pronunciation: [paʁtənɛ də bʁətaɲ]; Breton: Parzheneg) is a commune in the Ille-et-Vilaine department in Brittany in northwestern France.

== Population ==
Inhabitants of Parthenay-de-Bretagne are called Parthenaisiens in French.

Historical population
Year	Pop.	±% p.a.
1968	309	—
1975	311	+0.09%
1982	391	+3.32%
1990	478	+2.54%
1999	563	+1.84%
2007	1,251	+10.50%
2012	1,436	+2.80%
2017	1,748	+4.01%
2023	1,793	+0.42%
Source: INSEE

== See also ==
- Communes of the Ille-et-Vilaine department
