= Canton of Melesse =

Coordinates: 48.22°N 1.70°W

- Canton
- Country: France
- Region: Brittany
- Department: Ille-et-Vilaine
- No. of communes: {{{nbcomm}}}
- Population (2023): 39,639
- INSEE code: 35 14

The canton of Melesse is an administrative division of the Ille-et-Vilaine department, in northwestern France. It was created at the French canton reorganisation which came into effect in March 2015. Its seat is in Melesse.

It consists of the following communes:

1. Clayes
2. Gévezé
3. Guipel
4. Hédé-Bazouges
5. Langouet
6. Melesse
7. La Mézière
8. Montreuil-le-Gast
9. Parthenay-de-Bretagne
10. Saint-Germain-sur-Ille
11. Saint-Gilles
12. Saint-Gondran
13. Saint-Médard-sur-Ille
14. Saint-Symphorien
15. Vignoc
