= Vignoc =

Vignoc Veinyoc (Gallo) Gwinieg (Breton)
- Commune
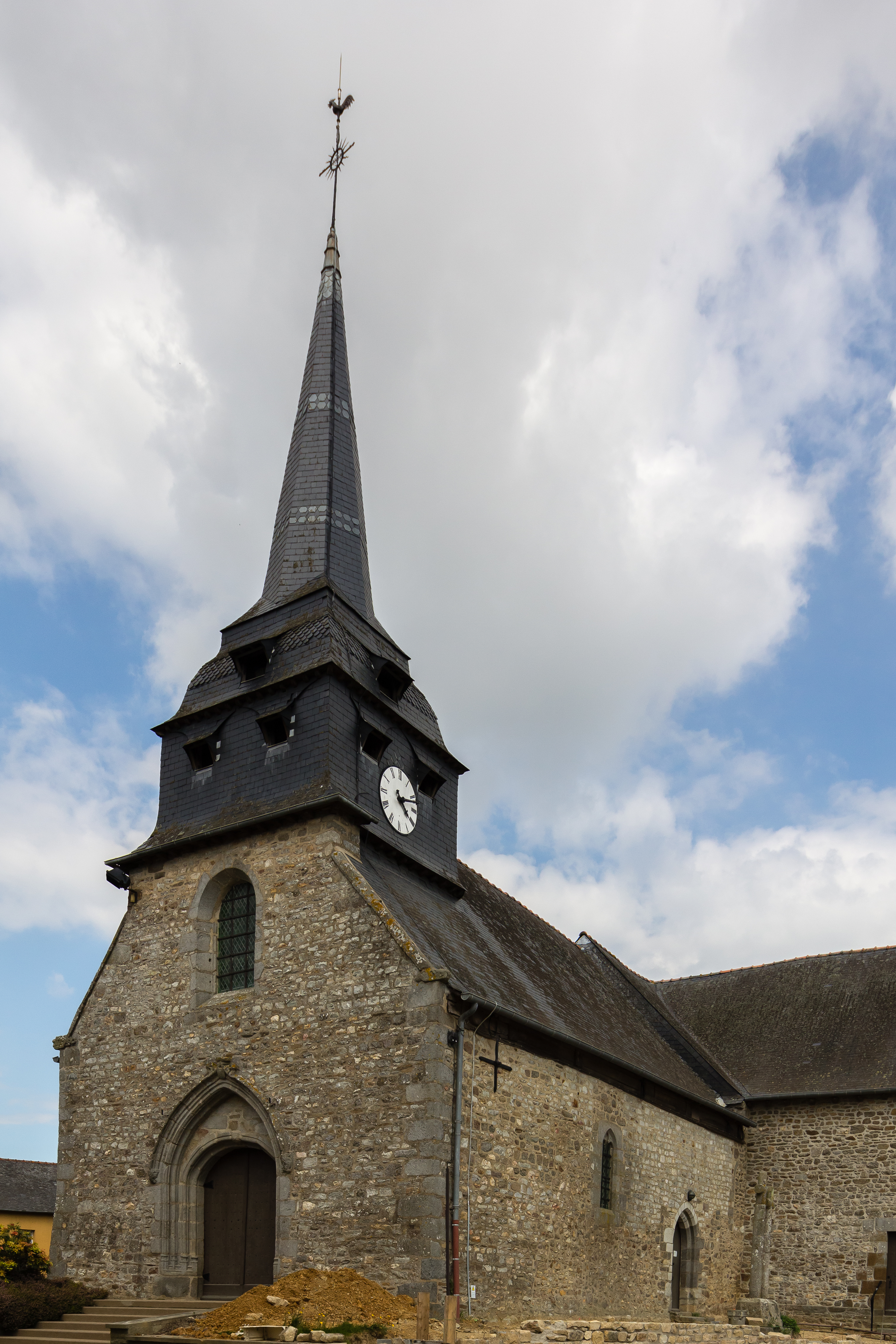
- The belltower of the church in Vignoc
- Location of Vignoc
- Location within France Location within Brittany
- Coordinates: 48°14′59″N 1°46′52″W
- Country: France
- Region: Brittany
- Department: Ille-et-Vilaine
- Arrondissement: Rennes
- Canton: Melesse
- Intercommunality: Val d'Ille-Aubigné

Government
  - Mayor (2020–2026): Daniel Houitte
- Area^{1}: 14.09 km^{2} (5.44 sq mi)
- Highest elevation: 121 m (397 ft)
- Lowest elevation: 63 m (207 ft)
- Population (2023): 2,329
  - Density: 165.3/km^{2} (428.1/sq mi)
- Time zone: UTC+01:00 (CET)
  - Summer (DST): UTC+02:00 (CEST)
- INSEE/Postal code: 35356 /35630
- ^{1} French Land Register data, which excludes lakes, ponds, glaciers > 1 km^{2} (0.386 sq mi or 247 acres) and river estuaries.

Vignoc (French pronunciation: [viɲɔk]; Breton: Gwinieg; Gallo: Veinyoc) is a commune in the Ille-et-Vilaine department in Brittany in northwestern France.

== Population ==
Inhabitants of Vignoc are called Vignocois in French.

Historical population
Year	Pop.	±% p.a.
1968	667	—
1975	674	+0.15%
1982	773	+1.98%
1990	887	+1.73%
1999	1,091	+2.33%
2007	1,718	+5.84%
2012	1,805	+0.99%
2017	1,910	+1.14%
2023	2,329	+3.36%
Source: INSEE

== See also ==
- Communes of the Ille-et-Vilaine department
