= Gévezé =

Gévezé Jaebevae (Gallo) Gevrezeg (Breton)
- Commune
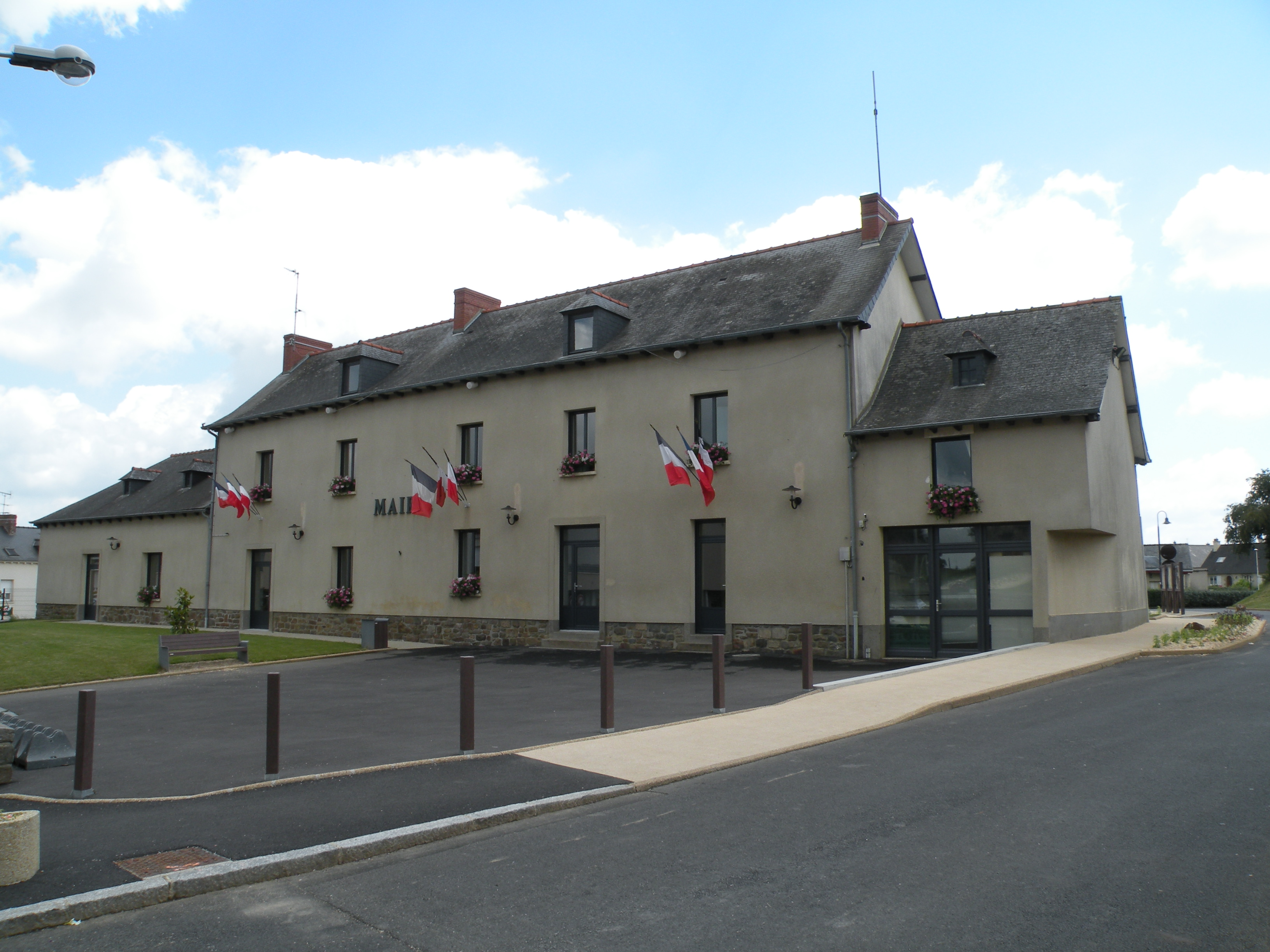
- Town hall

- Coat of arms
- Location of Gévezé
- Location within France Location within Brittany
- Coordinates: 48°13′12″N 1°47′12″W
- Country: France
- Region: Brittany
- Department: Ille-et-Vilaine
- Arrondissement: Rennes
- Canton: Melesse
- Intercommunality: Rennes Métropole

Government
  - Mayor (2020–2026): Jean-Claude Rouault
- Area^{1}: 27.54 km^{2} (10.63 sq mi)
- Highest elevation: 109 m (358 ft)
- Lowest elevation: 38 m (125 ft)
- Population (2023): 6,061
  - Density: 220.1/km^{2} (570.0/sq mi)
- Time zone: UTC+01:00 (CET)
  - Summer (DST): UTC+02:00 (CEST)
- INSEE/Postal code: 35120 /35850
- ^{1} French Land Register data, which excludes lakes, ponds, glaciers > 1 km^{2} (0.386 sq mi or 247 acres) and river estuaries.

Gévezé (French pronunciation: [ʒevze]; Breton: Gevrezeg; Gallo: Jaebevae) is a commune in the Ille-et-Vilaine department in Brittany in northwestern France.

== Population ==
Inhabitants of Gévezé are called Gévezéens in French.

Historical population
Year	Pop.	±% p.a.
1968	1,327	—
1975	1,650	+3.16%
1982	1,983	+2.66%
1990	2,434	+2.59%
1999	2,759	+1.40%
2007	3,598	+3.37%
2012	4,548	+4.80%
2017	5,301	+3.11%
2023	6,061	+2.26%
Source: INSEE

== See also ==
- Communes of the Ille-et-Vilaine department
