= La Mézière =

La Mézière La Maézierr (Gallo) Magoer (Breton)
- Commune
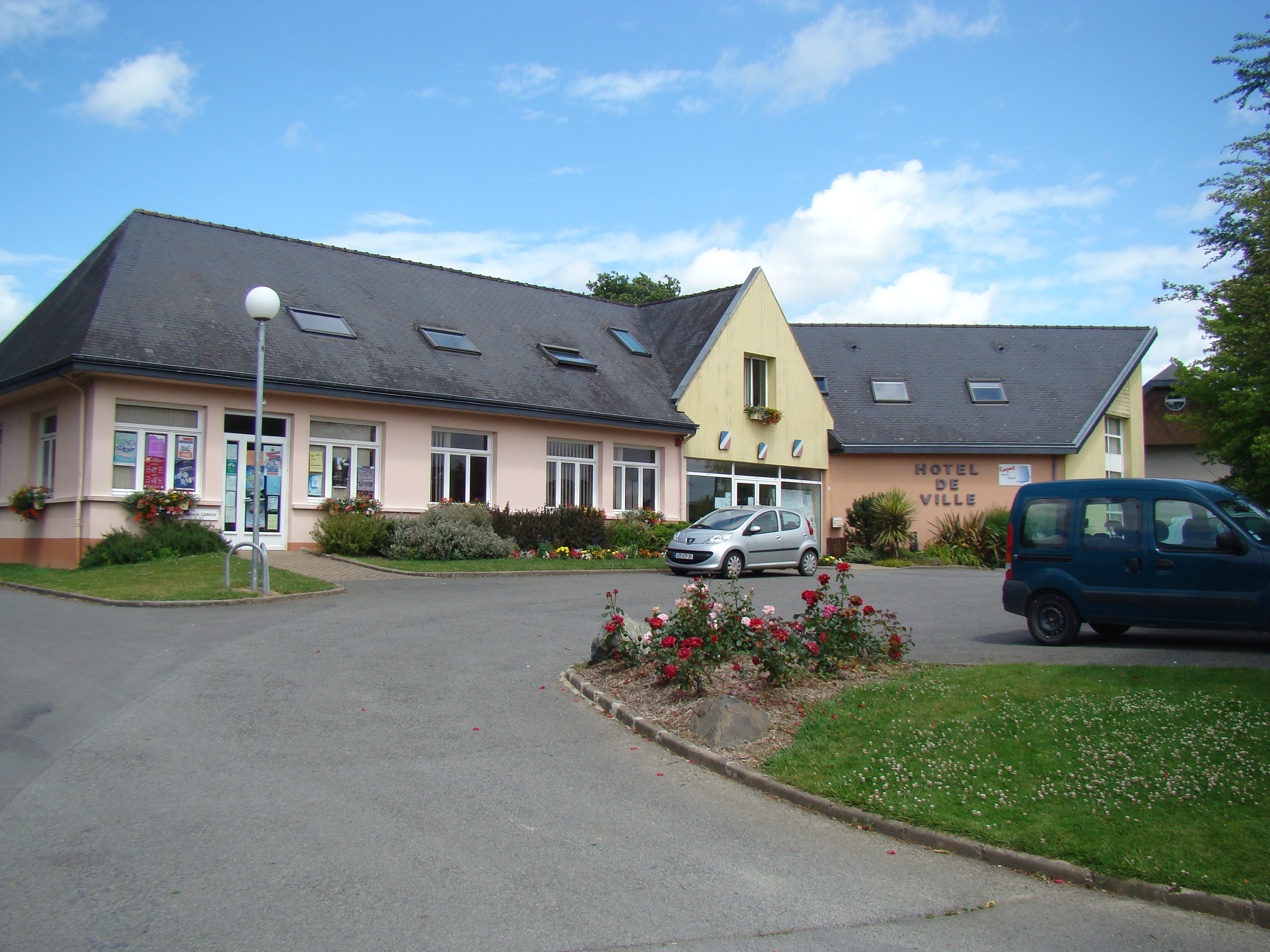
- The town hall of La Mezière

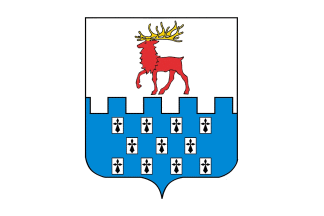
- Flag Coat of arms
- Location of La Mézière
- Location within France Location within Brittany
- Coordinates: 48°13′08″N 1°45′16″W
- Country: France
- Region: Brittany
- Department: Ille-et-Vilaine
- Arrondissement: Rennes
- Canton: Melesse
- Intercommunality: Val d'Ille-Aubigné

Government
  - Mayor (2020–2026): Pascal Goriaux
- Area^{1}: 16.23 km^{2} (6.27 sq mi)
- Highest elevation: 114 m (374 ft)
- Lowest elevation: 39 m (128 ft)
- Population (2023): 5,033
  - Density: 310.1/km^{2} (803.2/sq mi)
- Time zone: UTC+01:00 (CET)
  - Summer (DST): UTC+02:00 (CEST)
- INSEE/Postal code: 35177 /35520
- ^{1} French Land Register data, which excludes lakes, ponds, glaciers > 1 km^{2} (0.386 sq mi or 247 acres) and river estuaries.

La Mézière (French pronunciation: [la mezjɛʁ]; Breton: Magoer; Gallo: La Maézierr) is a commune in the Ille-et-Vilaine department in Brittany in northwestern France.

== Breton language ==
In 2008, 0.84% of primary-school children attended bilingual schools.

== Population ==
Inhabitants of La Mézière are called Macériens in French.

Historical population
Year	Pop.	±% p.a.
1968	1,005	—
1975	1,247	+3.13%
1982	1,614	+3.75%
1990	2,142	+3.60%
1999	3,121	+4.27%
2007	4,083	+3.42%
2012	4,426	+1.63%
2017	4,892	+2.02%
2023	5,033	+0.47%
Source: INSEE

== See also ==
- Communes of the Ille-et-Vilaine department
