= Melesse =

Melesse Mèlecz (Gallo) Meled (Breton)
- Commune
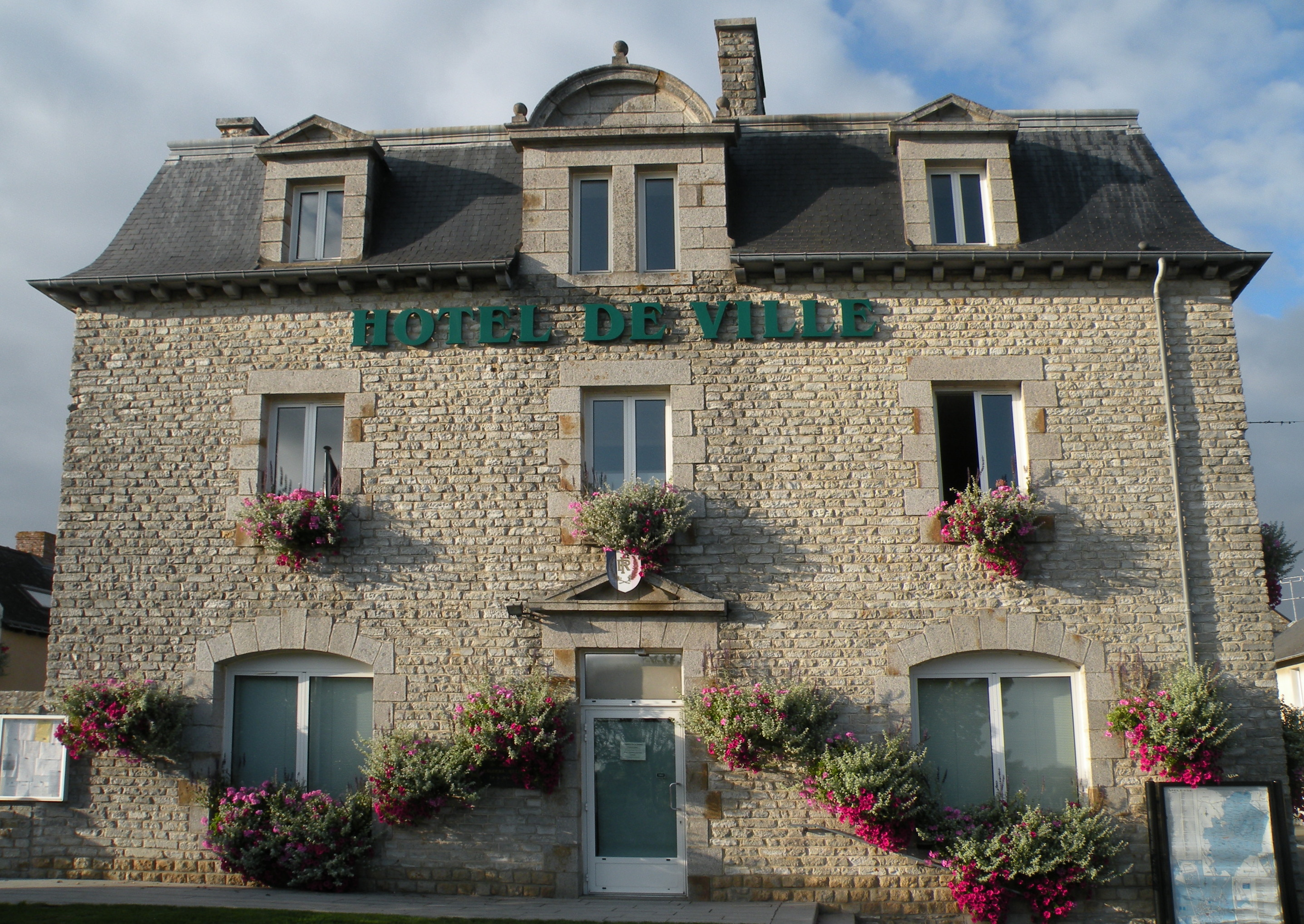
- The town hall of Melesse

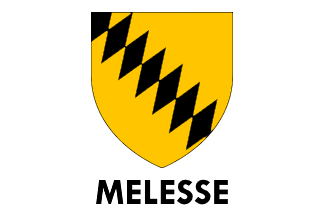
- Flag Coat of arms
- Location of Melesse
- Location within France Location within Brittany
- Coordinates: 48°13′05″N 1°41′41″W
- Country: France
- Region: Brittany
- Department: Ille-et-Vilaine
- Arrondissement: Rennes
- Canton: Melesse

Government
  - Mayor (2026–2032): Yves Férey
- Area^{1}: 32.39 km^{2} (12.51 sq mi)
- Highest elevation: 111 m (364 ft)
- Lowest elevation: 38 m (125 ft)
- Population (2023): 7,541
  - Density: 232.8/km^{2} (603.0/sq mi)
- Time zone: UTC+01:00 (CET)
  - Summer (DST): UTC+02:00 (CEST)
- INSEE/Postal code: 35173 /35520
- ^{1} French Land Register data, which excludes lakes, ponds, glaciers > 1 km^{2} (0.386 sq mi or 247 acres) and river estuaries.

Melesse (French pronunciation: [məlɛs]; Breton: Meled; Gallo: Melècz) is a commune in the Ille-et-Vilaine department of Brittany in northwestern France.

== Population ==
Inhabitants of Melesse are called Melessiens in French.

Historical population
Year	Pop.	±% p.a.
1968	2,119	—
1975	3,200	+6.07%
1982	4,231	+4.07%
1990	4,675	+1.26%
1999	5,164	+1.11%
2007	5,456	+0.69%
2012	5,708	+0.91%
2017	6,576	+2.87%
2023	7,541	+2.31%
Source: INSEE

== See also ==
- Communes of the Ille-et-Vilaine department
