= Montreuil-sur-Ille =

Montreuil-sur-Ille Móstroelh (Gallo) Mousterel-an-Il (Breton)
- Commune
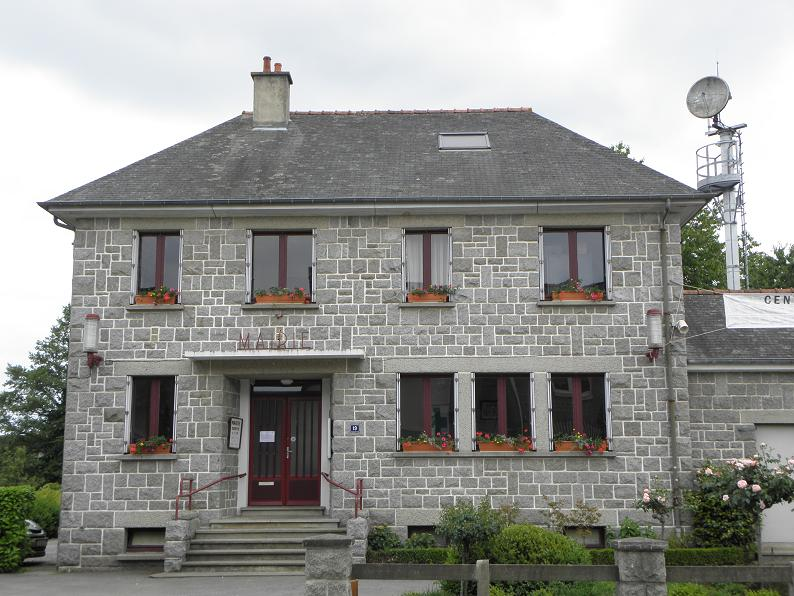
- The town hall of Montreuil-sur-Ille

- Coat of arms
- Location of Montreuil-sur-Ille
- Location within France Location within Brittany
- Coordinates: 48°18′28″N 1°40′04″W
- Country: France
- Region: Brittany
- Department: Ille-et-Vilaine
- Arrondissement: Rennes
- Canton: Val-Couesnon

Government
  - Mayor (2020–2026): Yvon Taillard
- Area^{1}: 15.15 km^{2} (5.85 sq mi)
- Highest elevation: 96 m (315 ft)
- Lowest elevation: 50 m (160 ft)
- Population (2023): 2,420
  - Density: 160/km^{2} (414/sq mi)
- Time zone: UTC+01:00 (CET)
  - Summer (DST): UTC+02:00 (CEST)
- INSEE/Postal code: 35195 /35440
- ^{1} French Land Register data, which excludes lakes, ponds, glaciers > 1 km^{2} (0.386 sq mi or 247 acres) and river estuaries.

Montreuil-sur-Ille (French pronunciation: [mɔ̃tʁœj syʁ il], literally Montreuil on the Ille; Breton: Mousterel-an-Il; Gallo: Móstroelh) is a commune in the Ille-et-Vilaine department of Brittany in northwestern France. The commune's name reflects its location on the Ille river.

== Population ==
Inhabitants of Montreuil-sur-Ille are called in French Montreuillais.

Historical population
| Year | Pop. | ±% p.a. |
|---|---|---|
| 1968 | 1,399 | — |
| 1975 | 1,479 | +0.80% |
| 1982 | 1,453 | −0.25% |
| 1990 | 1,418 | −0.30% |
| 1999 | 1,554 | +1.02% |
| 2007 | 1,925 | +2.71% |
| 2012 | 2,110 | +1.85% |
| 2017 | 2,383 | +2.46% |
| 2023 | 2,420 | +0.26% |
Source: INSEE

== See also ==
- Communes of the Ille-et-Vilaine department
