= Ille =

River in northwestern France

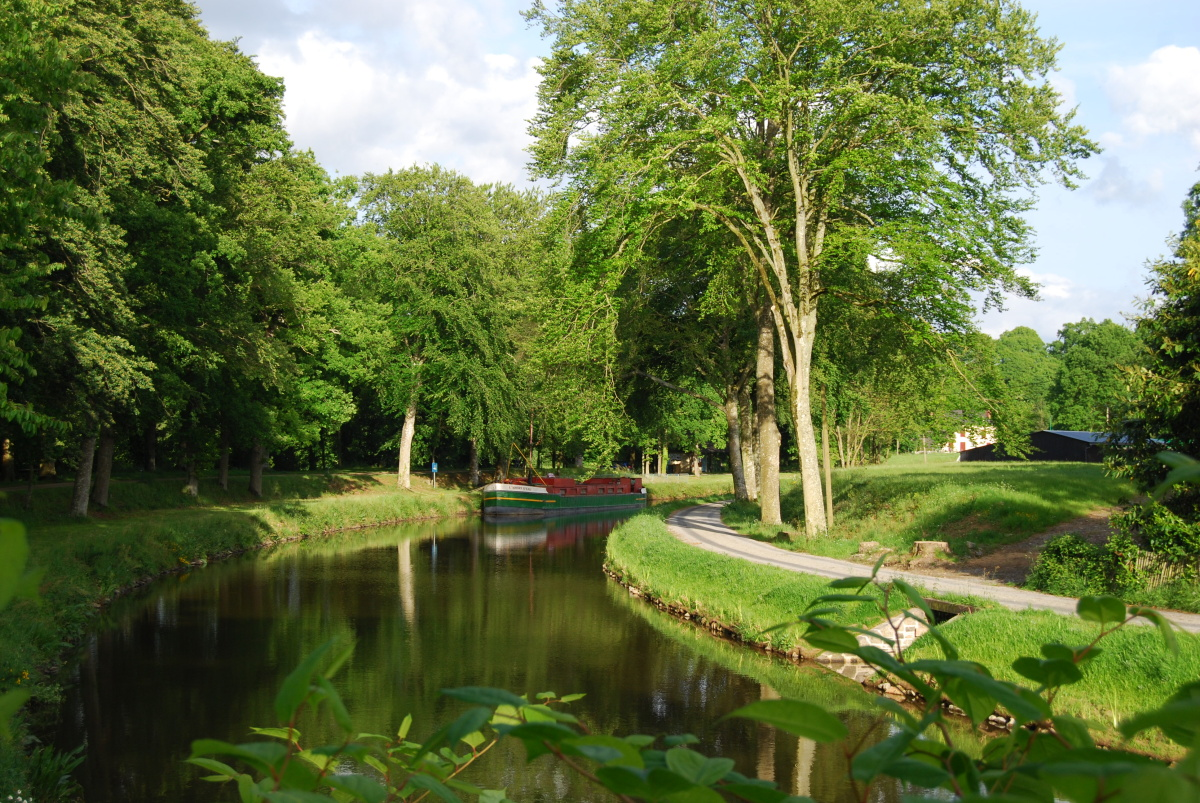
- The Ille in Chevaigné near Rennes

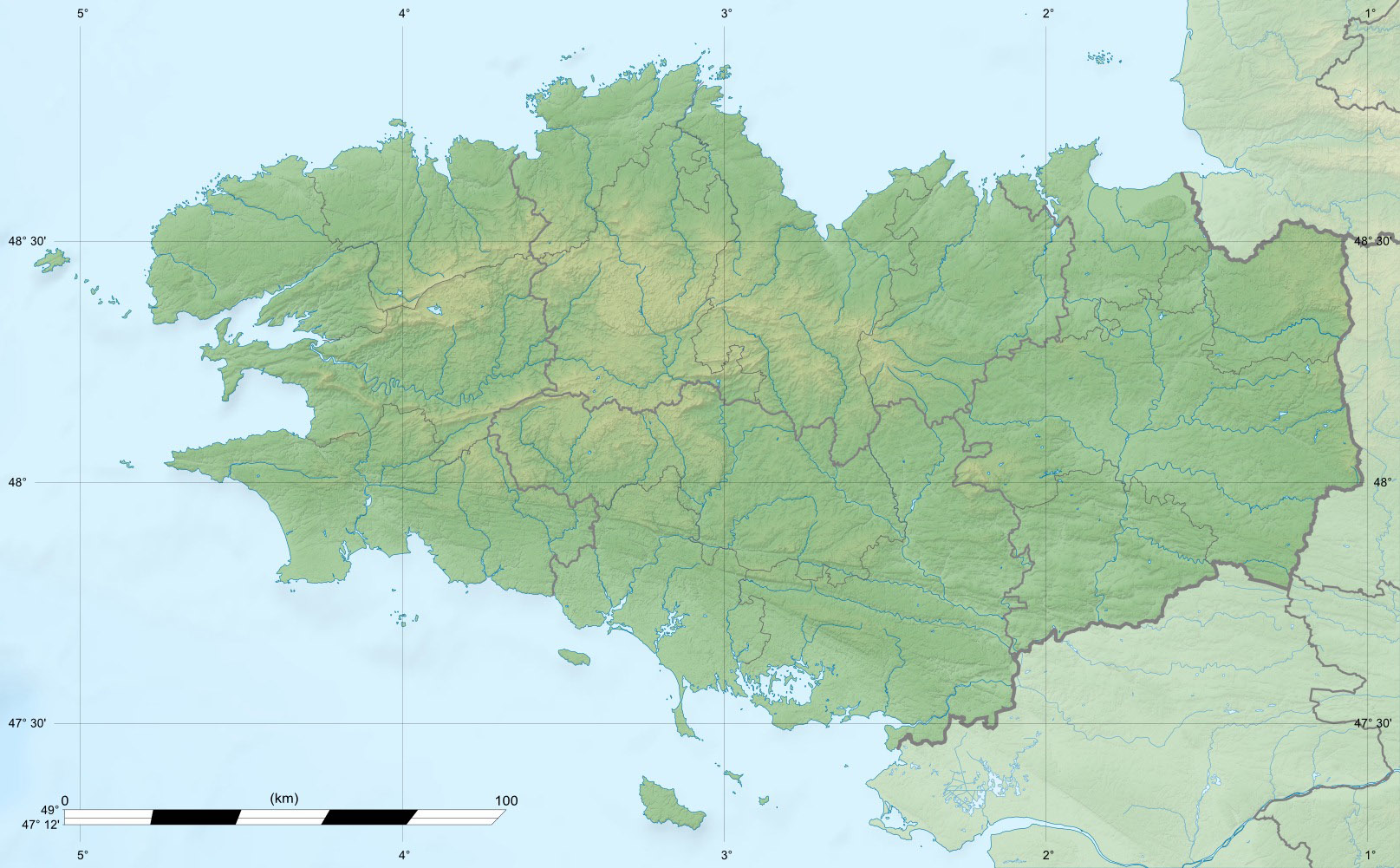
- Location within France Location within Brittany

Location
- Country: France

Physical characteristics
- Source
  - location: Near Dingé, Ille-et-Vilaine
- Mouth
  - location: Vilaine
  - coordinates: 48°6′27″N 1°41′50″W
- Length: 48.9 km (30.4 mi)

Basin features
- Progression: Vilaine→ Atlantic Ocean

The Ille (French pronunciation: [il]; Breton: Il) is a small river in Brittany, France, right tributary of the river Vilaine. It is 48.9 km (30.4 mi) long. It flows into the Vilaine in the city Rennes.

The Ille is linked to the semi-tidal Rance river by the Canal d'Ille-et-Rance. By this canal, Rennes has a connection with the English Channel coast at St. Malo. The canal is used primarily for tourist boats.

The Ille flows through the department Ille-et-Vilaine and the following towns: Montreuil-sur-Ille, Betton and Rennes. From Montreuil to Rennes the river runs parallel to the Canal d'Ille-et-Rance.
