= Celtic Tales (Corto Maltese) =

Celtic Tales (Les Celtiques)
- Series: Corto Maltese
- Publisher: Casterman

Creative team
- Creator: Hugo Pratt

Original publication
- Published in: 1971–1972
- ISBN: 978-1-63140-507-5

Chronology
- Preceded by: Beyond the Windy Isles
- Followed by: The Ethiopian

Celtic Tales (or The Celts) is a volume of comics that brings together six adventures of Corto Maltese, a Maltese sailor. These stories were written and drawn by the Italian comic book creator Hugo Pratt, and published for the first time between 1971 and 1972 in the French comic magazine Pif Gadget. They take place in Europe, during World War I, between 1917 and 1918. The stories are:

- The Angel in the Window to the Orient
- Under the Flag of Gold
- Concerto in O Minor for Harp and Nitroglycerin
- A Midwinter Morning’s Dream
- Côtes de Nuit and Picardy Roses
- Burlesque Between Zuydcoote and Bray-Dunes

== Six stories ==
=== The Angel in the Window to the Orient ===
==== Abstract ====
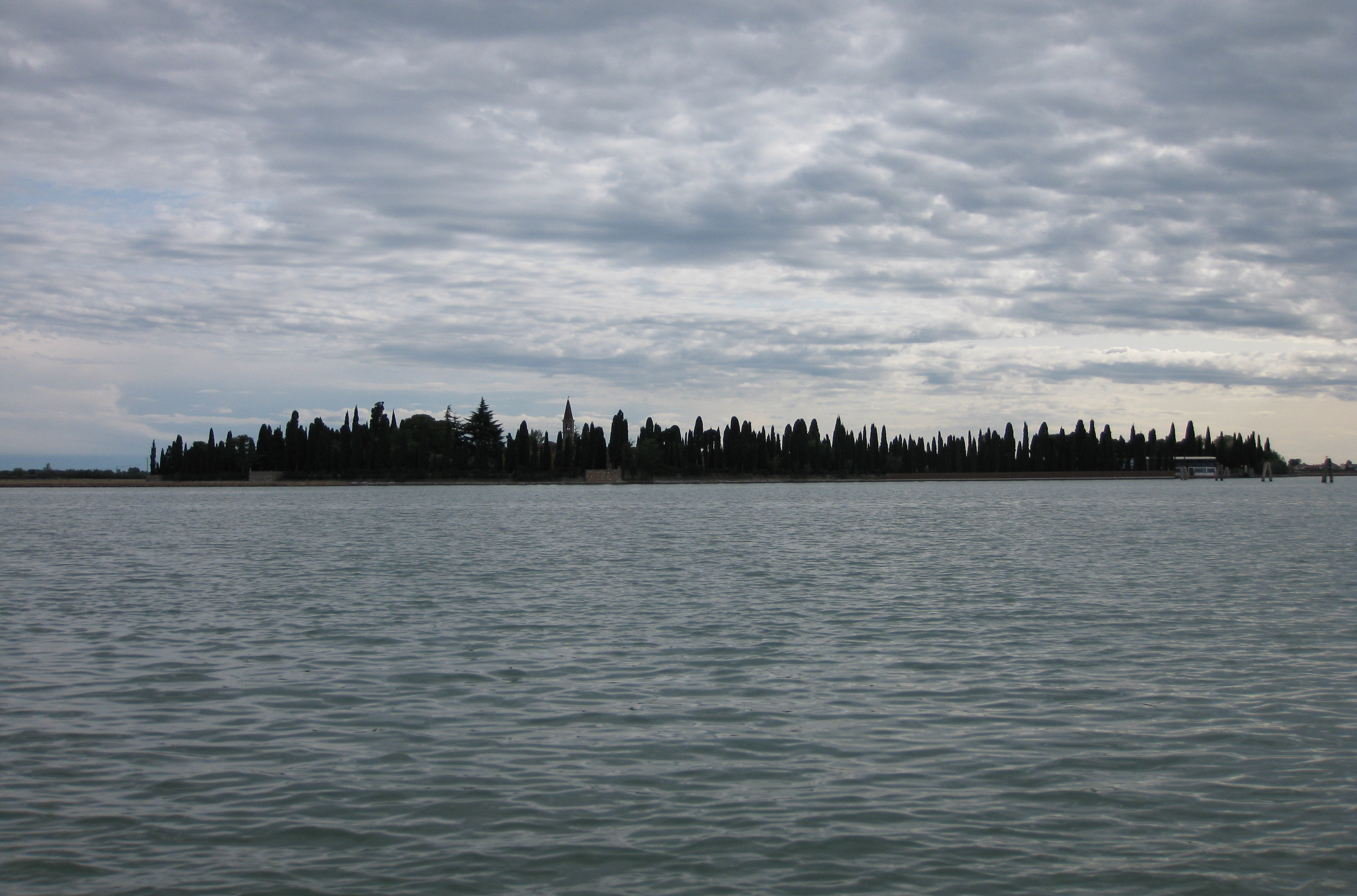
San Francesco del Deserto, Venice

In the Venetian Lagoon, San Francesco del Deserto is an island that is home to a Franciscan monastery. In 1917, Corto arrived and asked the monks for a copy of a map, drawn on a missionary's skin. This could lead him to the location of the Sapa Inca Atahualpa's seven mines, around the Marañón River, in Peru. These mines are also the legendary Seven Cities of Cibola and the mythic El Dorado. However, only six are listed on the document - the seventh is missing. Thus, a monk advises Corto to go to the Venetian Ghetto to meet Melchisedech the rabbi, who owns a diary describing all seven cities. Once there, he discovers that a page showing the location of the seventh city is missing from the book. The responsible party is seemingly a strange paralysed woman living in a Venetian palace, nicknamed "The Angel in the Window to the Orient".

Corto finds that, in recent days, an Austrian plane has often flown over her house. This little game intrigues Antonio Sorrentino, the Carabinieri captain. With few of his men and Corto, he goes to the palace to unravel the mystery. Inside, the sailor discovers that the "paralytic woman" is in fact Venexiana Stevenson, his old enemy from Honduras (cf. the story "Banana Conga", in the volume Beyond the Windy Isles) who now wants to find El Dorado. While the Carabinieries take out her Austrian accomplices, Venexiana manages to escape.

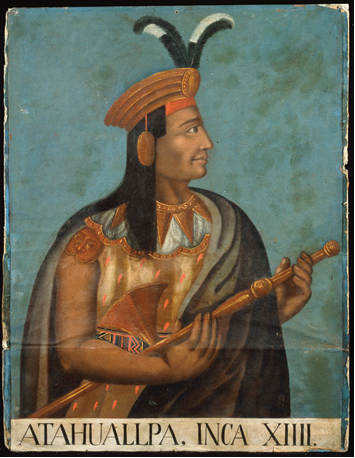
"Atahuallpa, Inca XIIII". Portrait located in Berlin Ethnologisches Museum, Staatliche Museen, Berlin, Germany (Ethnological Museum of Berlin, Germany)

==== Analysis ====
This story is a transition between Corto's adventures in the Americas (in the volume Under the Sign of Capricorn and Beyond the Windy Isles) and in Europe (in this volume). In the previous story, in Peru, the sailor met a monk who told him about this mysterious map kept in Venice. This story is his attempt to find it.

To document this story, Hugo Pratt explains that he drew information from the books of a missionary institute in Verona (Veneto, Italy), the Comboni. This place is overflowing with books nibbled by rats, which were written by missionaries stationed in South America. The latter were in close contact with the natives. So, according to Pratt, this information was so important that people from Peru or Brazil come there to study it and learn Indian dialects.

Hugo Pratt enjoyed showing his childhood city, Venice, as he would do in future stories like Fable of Venice. Thus, he guides the reader between Venetians isles and buildings. Scarso, the man who serves the sole (the "sfogio") really existed and worked in Malamocco (village of the Lido where the comics creator has a house). In addition, various places are superbly drawn: the Piazza San Marco (which includes St Mark's Basilica, the winged lion — the Lion of Venice — and the Doge's Palace, Santa Maria della Salute, etc). Then, through Corto's dialogue, Pratt explains this city is so beautiful that it is difficult to leave it.

=== Under the Flag of Gold ===
==== Abstract ====
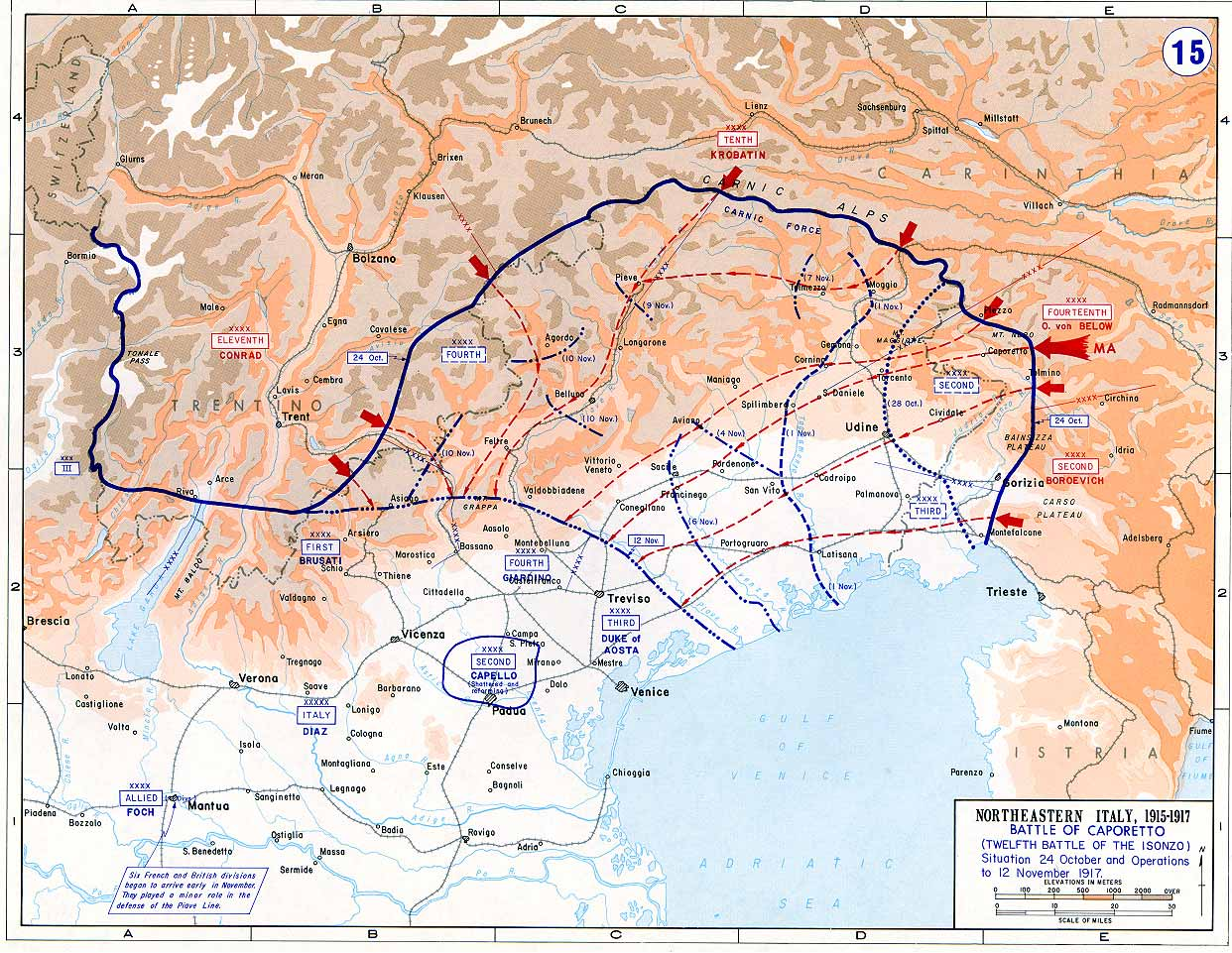
Map of the Italian Front, Battle of Caporetto

On the north coast of the Adriatic Sea, the Battle of Caporetto is raging between Italy and Austria-Hungary. The fallen monarchy of Montenegro hid its royal gold at Sette Casoni (Valcasoni), in the middle of the Italian front. Thus, the Montenegrin Republican Army hired Corto Maltese to recover it.

This "pirate" has a complex plan to achieve this goal, involving partners of different nationalities. Lieutenant Radesky, an Austrian, secretly watches the operation on board an observation balloon and diverts the attention of his compatriots from the city. Meanwhile, Scottish and French soldiers obtain the gold bars in a church right under the noses of the Austrian Uhlans. Then, Radesky is recovered by Americans (including a paramedic named Ernest Way, an allusion to Ernest Hemingway). Finally, the fortune is loaded onto a Greek gunboat commanded by Onatis (evoking Aristotle Onassis), where Corto is waiting at the end of the operation.

==== Analysis ====
This story takes place during a war that overturned European borders and regimes. Since 1910, Montenegro had constituted an independent kingdom, before being incorporated into the Kingdom of Yugoslavia in 1918. Fighting with the Allies, Montenegro was occupied by Austro-Hungarian troops.

Corto Maltese comments on the constant moving borders during the conflict. For example, a village can be Italian or Austrian depending on the days. This was the case of Lozzo di Cadore, on the Piave, in Veneto. So he stayed put while the fronts changed around him. Through this process, he manages to meet people who can help him. Even if his accomplices are from different nationalities, they all come together under the same flag, gold.

=== Concerto in O Minor for Harp and Nitroglycerin ===
==== Abstract ====
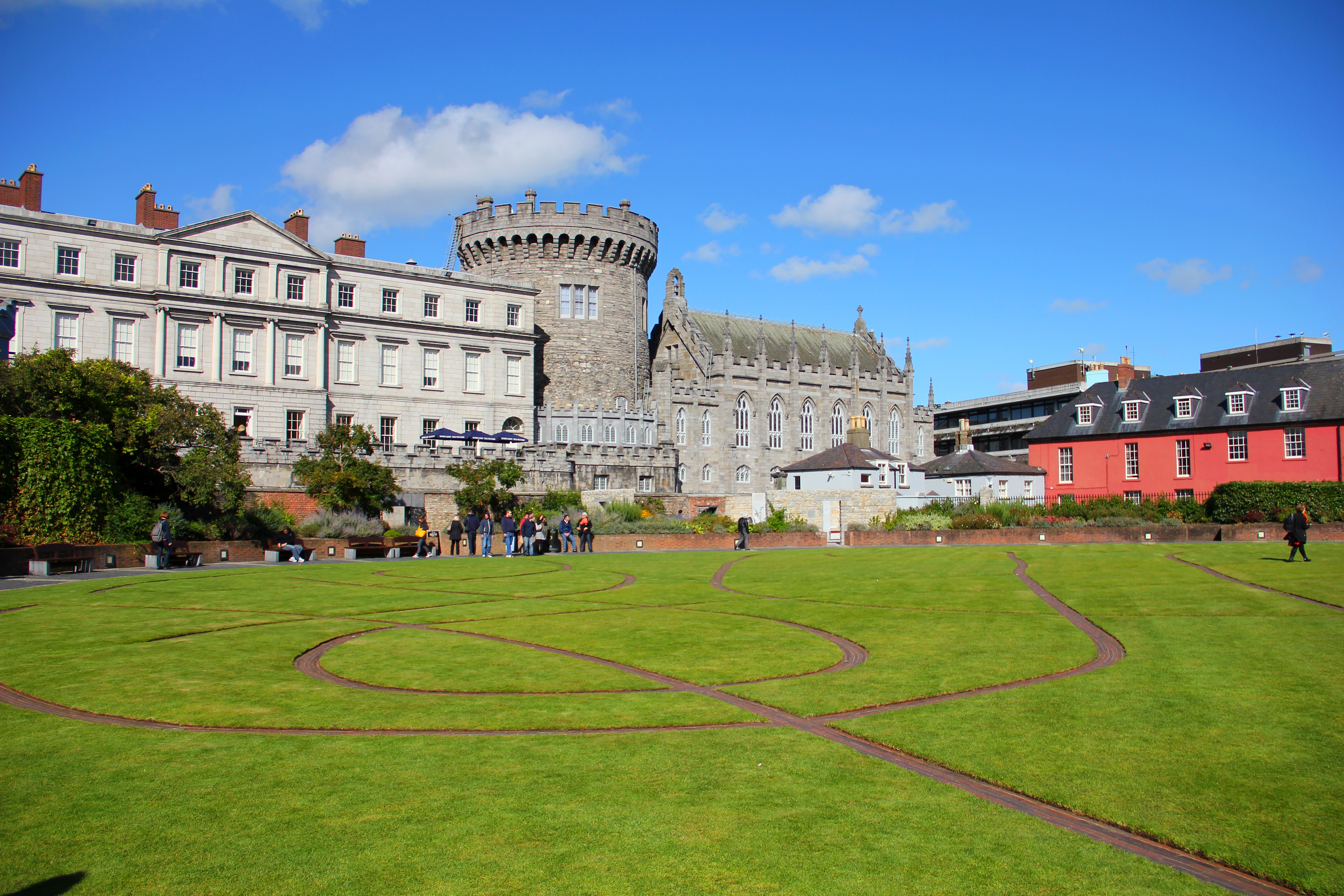
The Dubhlinn Gardens, are located adjacent to Dublin Castle.

In October 1917, enriched by the Montenegrin gold, Corto Maltese helps Sinn Féin to fight against the British Army. He learns that one of their members, O’Sullivan, has betrayed them and is responsible for the execution of Pat Finnucan by the British. Finnucan was the leader of the movement and the symbol of the Irish Revolution. In Dublin, Corto meets the deceased's wife, Moira "Banshee" O’Danann, who wants to avenge her husband. With her help, Corto enters the British general headquarters (Dublin Castle) and detonates a bomb.

But inside, he discovers a terrible secret, which Sean Finnucan, Pat's brother, later confirms - Pat was the real traitor, while O'Sullivan was in fact spying against the British. But Sean refused to reveal the truth about his brother; he had to pass for a hero, a martyr, to galvanize the revolutionaries. O’Sullivan had agreed to make it look like he was the traitor, so Pat's reputation would not be questioned. Sean tells Corto that no one can know the truth, not even Moira. Later, Corto finds her on a beach and suggests that she leave with him. However, she declines as she considers herself a banshee who brings misfortune to others and also wants to fulfil her prior commitments to the revolution.

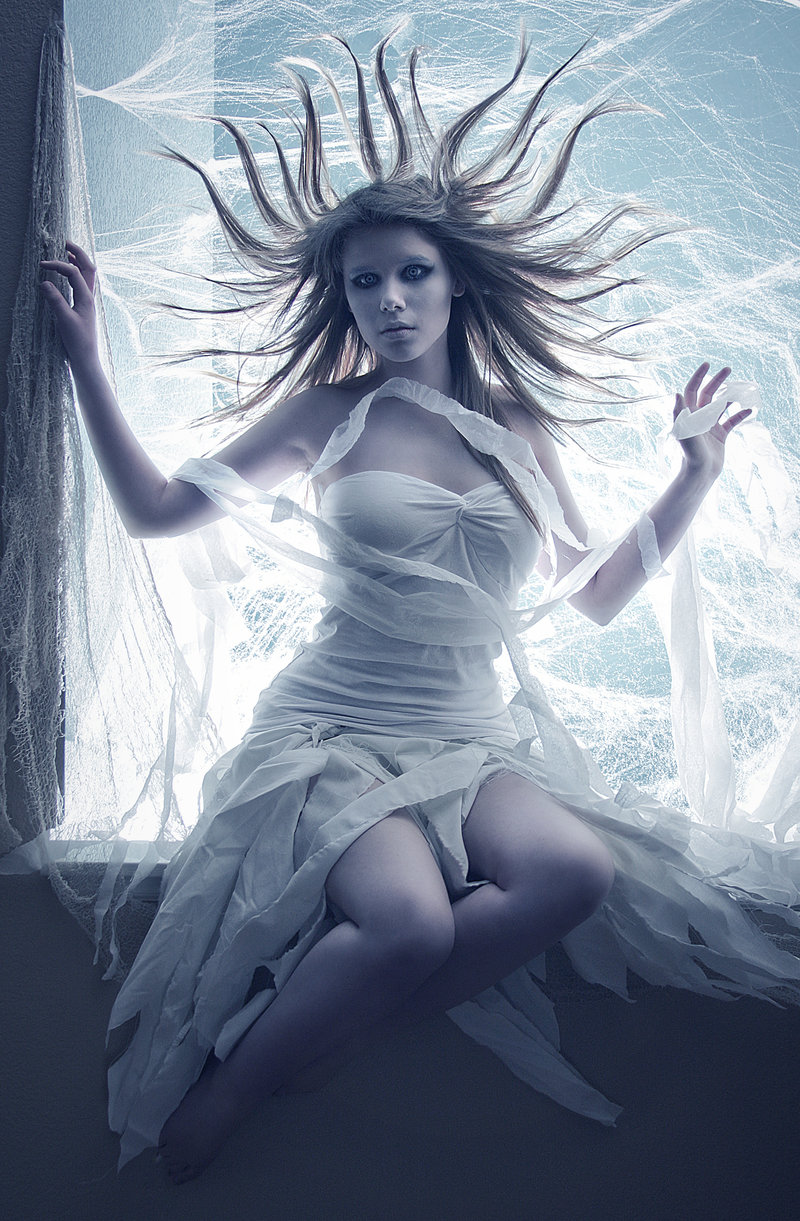
Modern illustration of a banshee.

==== Analysis ====
This unusual title speaks of Ireland and its struggle for freedom:

- "Ó" is a patronymic term in Irish names;
- The Celtic harp is a square harp particularly traditional in Ireland (cláirseach);
- Nitroglycerin evokes this violent conflict.

To build this story, Pratt relied on documents and testimonies. He met Pat Finnucan's niece, whose story inspired him to write this episode. He also exchanged with his friend Patricia Frawley, an Irish American, from Wheeling, West Virginia. She physically inspired the character of Moira O’Danann.

Pat Finnucan's headstone features the quote "Fianna". In the Irish mythology, these were groups of semi-independent warriors. In more recent history, this word has been used for the name Fianna Éireann, an Irish nationalist youth organisation founded in 1909.

Other elements are mentioned in this story, such as the Easter Rising, led by Patrick Pearse. This bloody event led to the recognition of the Proclamation of the Irish Republic, then to the Irish Free State, in 1922.

=== A Midwinter Morning's Dream ===
==== Abstract ====
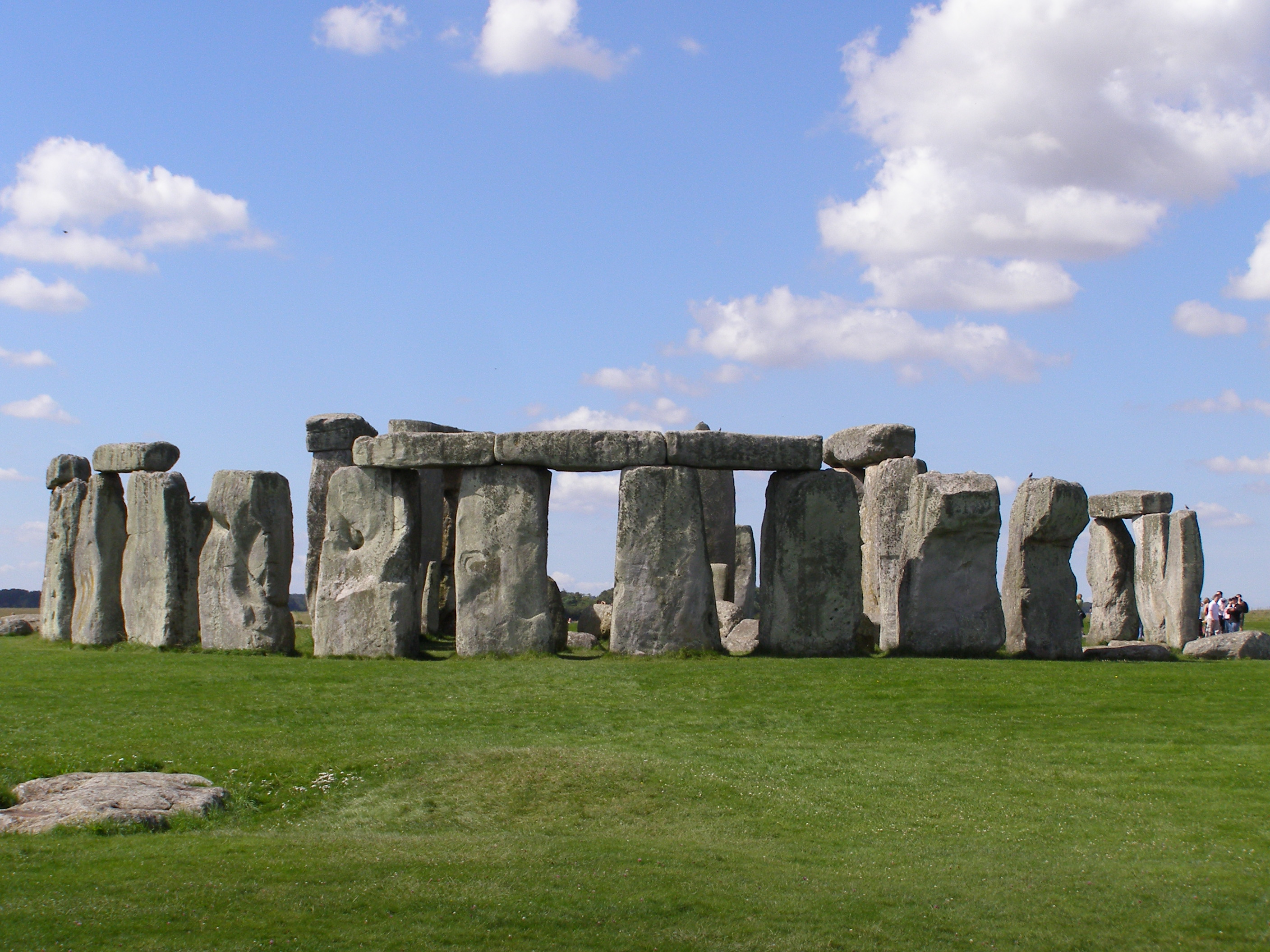
Stonehenge in July 2007.

Stonehenge, a legendary place in Wiltshire, England, 21 December 1917; during the winter solstice, many creatures from Celtic mythology are meeting to discuss a dramatic event. Germans will soon attack England. And with them will come characters from Germanic mythology, who could threaten their prominence, exactly as they did during the Anglo-Saxon settlement of Britain (contemporary to the Arthurian cycle). As they cannot intervene directly, they need a mortal to help them. Corto, who sleeps nearby, is awakened by Puck, in the form of a raven, and instructed to follow him. The sailor discovers Major Vortigern Welsh, of the Duke of Cornwall's Light Infantry and member of the Parliament of the United Kingdom. The Welsh, who is dying of a self-inflicted gunshot wound, warns him against his wife Rowena, a German spy, who has caused his misfortunes. With her brothers Hengist and Horsa, she plans to attack Tintagel Castle, (Cornwall), where the Allies are meeting.

At Tintagel, Rowena commands a German U-boat to attack the castle, while a British corvette lies at anchor. Corto therefore commandeers a tugboat to sink the submarine. Shortly after, a trial condemns Rowena. But, as a token of respect, she gives her Iron Cross to the sailor. In addition, Corto is awarded a Conspicuous Gallantry Medal by the British. Later, back at Stonehenge, Corto sleeps nearby again. Oberon congratulate Puck, who admits having snatched his medals from Maltese. So Corto won't know if his adventure was true or a Midwinter Morning's Dream.

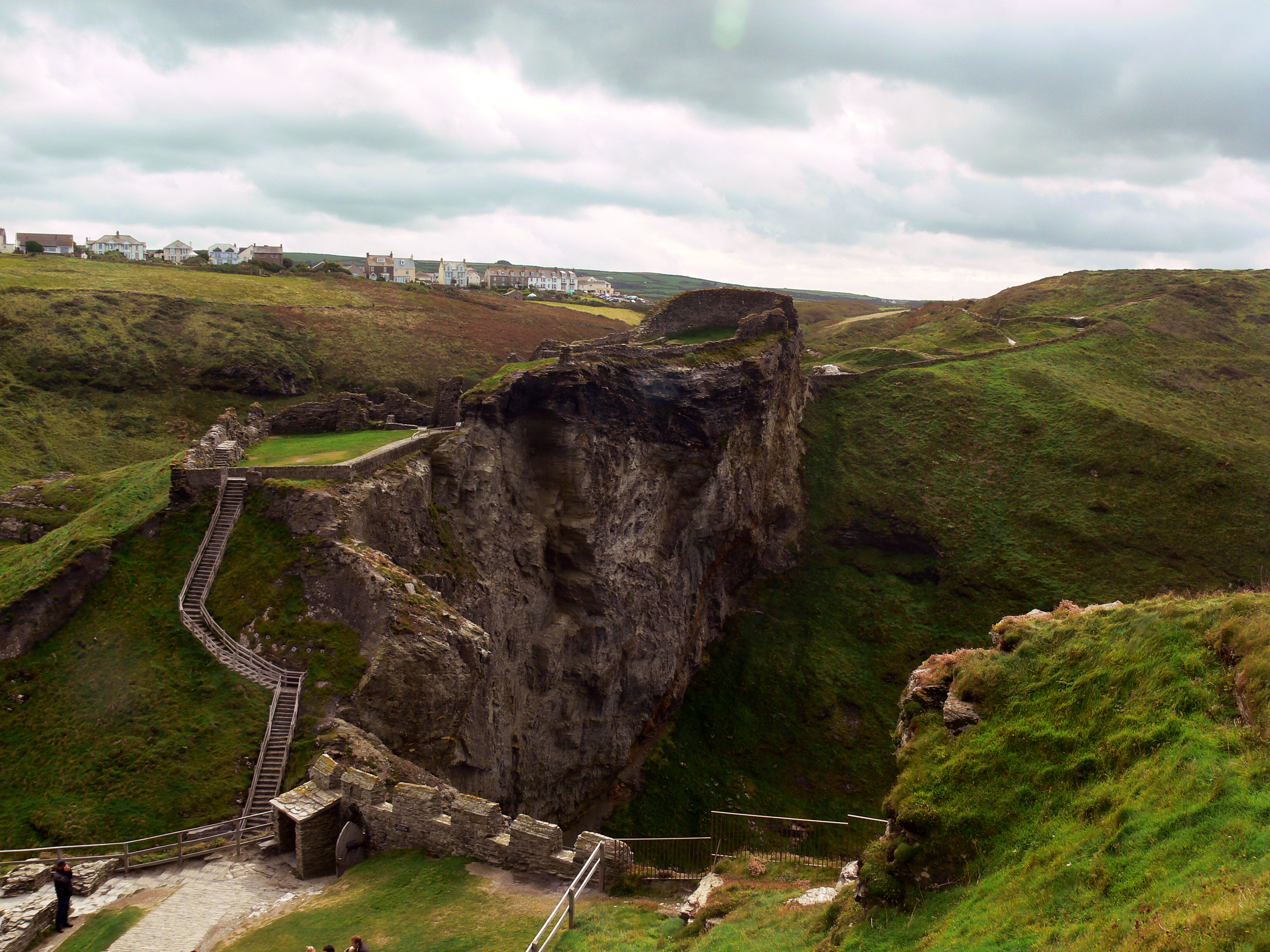
The outer and upper wards of the ruined Tintagel Castle.

==== Analysis ====
As the title suggests, this story clearly alludes to A Midsummer Night's Dream, a famous comedy written by William Shakespeare in 1595/96. Here we find characters from the play, Oberon and Puck. While the play takes place during St. John's Day, the summer solstice, the comic is set during the winter solstice. In this story, Oberon evokes Huon of Bordeaux, a chanson de geste where he is also present and is shown as the child of Morgan le Fay and Julius Caesar.

As in the Trojan War, a conflict between two existing countries is combined with a conflict between their respective mythologies. Various elements from the Arthurian legend are also transposed here. Merlin and Morgan participate in the meeting at Stonehenge, a monument erected by the enchanter, as he recalls. Tintagel Castle is closely tied to King Arthur. Some semi-legendary characters are transposed in this story. According to legend, Vortigern was a king of the Britons and married Rowena, an Anglo-Saxon. He also made a pact with her brothers Hengist and Horsa, who betrayed him to invade Great Britain. Thus, the British Major Vortigern Welsh is manipulated by his German wife Rowena, who plans to attack England with her brothers Hengist and Horsa.

The idea of this story was inspired by chance to Hugo Pratt. While visiting a cemetery in northern France, he discovered a curious tomb. Its occupant was a Canadian named Julius César (like the famous Roman conqueror, Oberon's father in some stories), who had died in a battle against Germany in 1918. It was for the cartoonist a message asking him to write this story.

=== Côtes de Nuit and Picardy Roses ===
==== Abstract ====
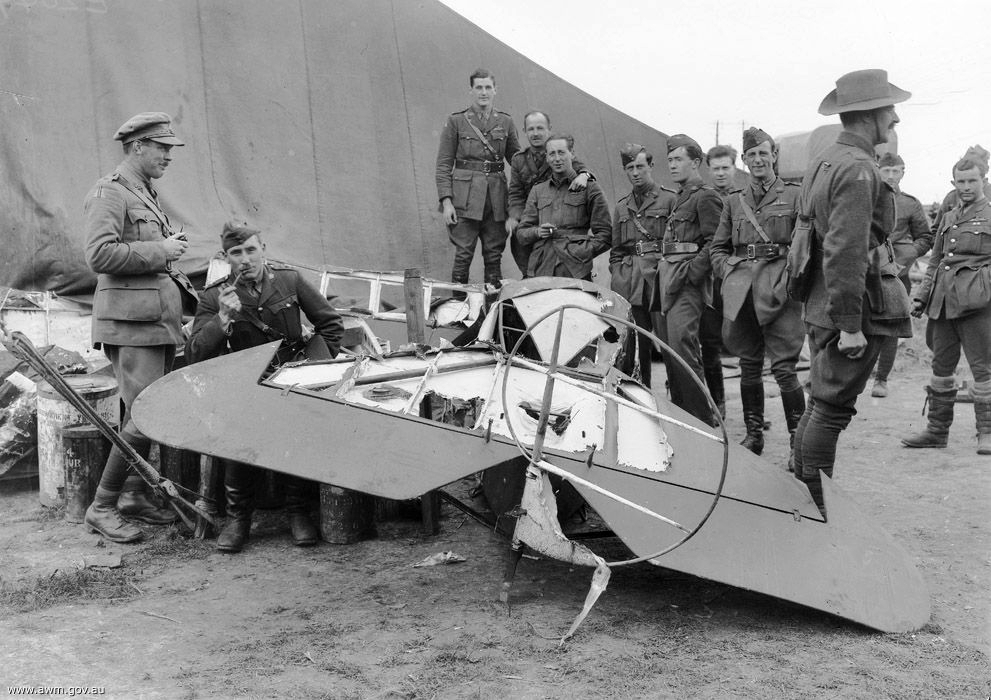
Australian airmen with Richthofen's triplane 425/17 after it was dismembered by souvenir hunters

In northern France, on the banks of the Somme, on 20 April 1918, soldiers are fighting. The Red Baron (Manfred von Richthofen), a German, has successfully shot down numerous enemy planes in his Fokker Dr.I. Two Australians talk to Corto about a way to kill him. Officer Sandy explains that his friend Clem is a crack shot, but only when he is drunk. So he tries to convince the sailor to open his bottles of Burgundy wine to make Clem drunk. But Corto categorically refuses. The latter hopes to see his old friend, the British Cain Groovesnore. He is a volunteer in the Royal Air Force and located in an English aviation camp near Bertangles.

The following day, Sandy discretely steals the much-vaunted bottles to inebriate Clem. The latter shot at the Red Baron flying over the area, but seemed to miss the target. Yet, a short time later, Manfred von Richthofen crashed; soldiers strip him and claim responsibility for the exploit. But there is no doubt for Sandy: it's Clem who had shot him. Unfortunately, an airplane then bombs the truck in which Clem was brewing and killed him. Sandy feels responsible for the death of his friend; but according to Corto, it's the fault of the war...

==== Analysis ====
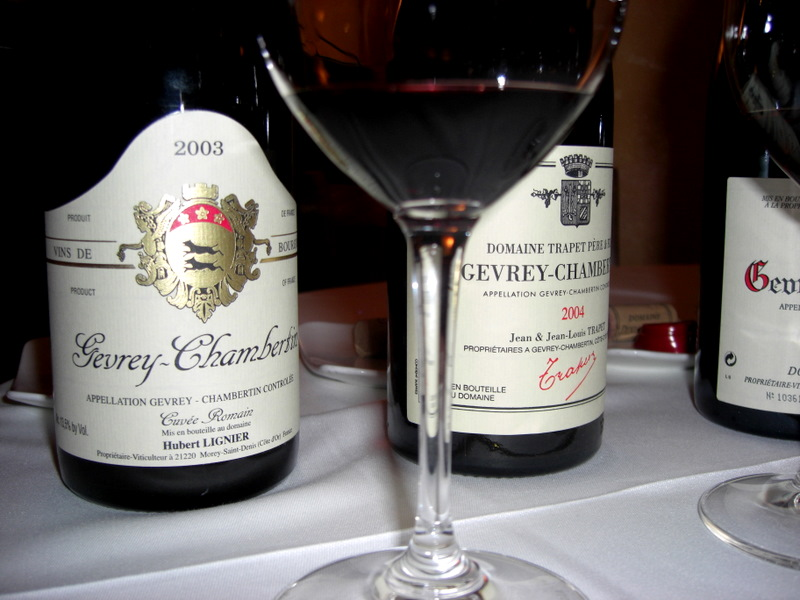
Wine from the Gevrey-Chambertin region of the Cote de Nuits.

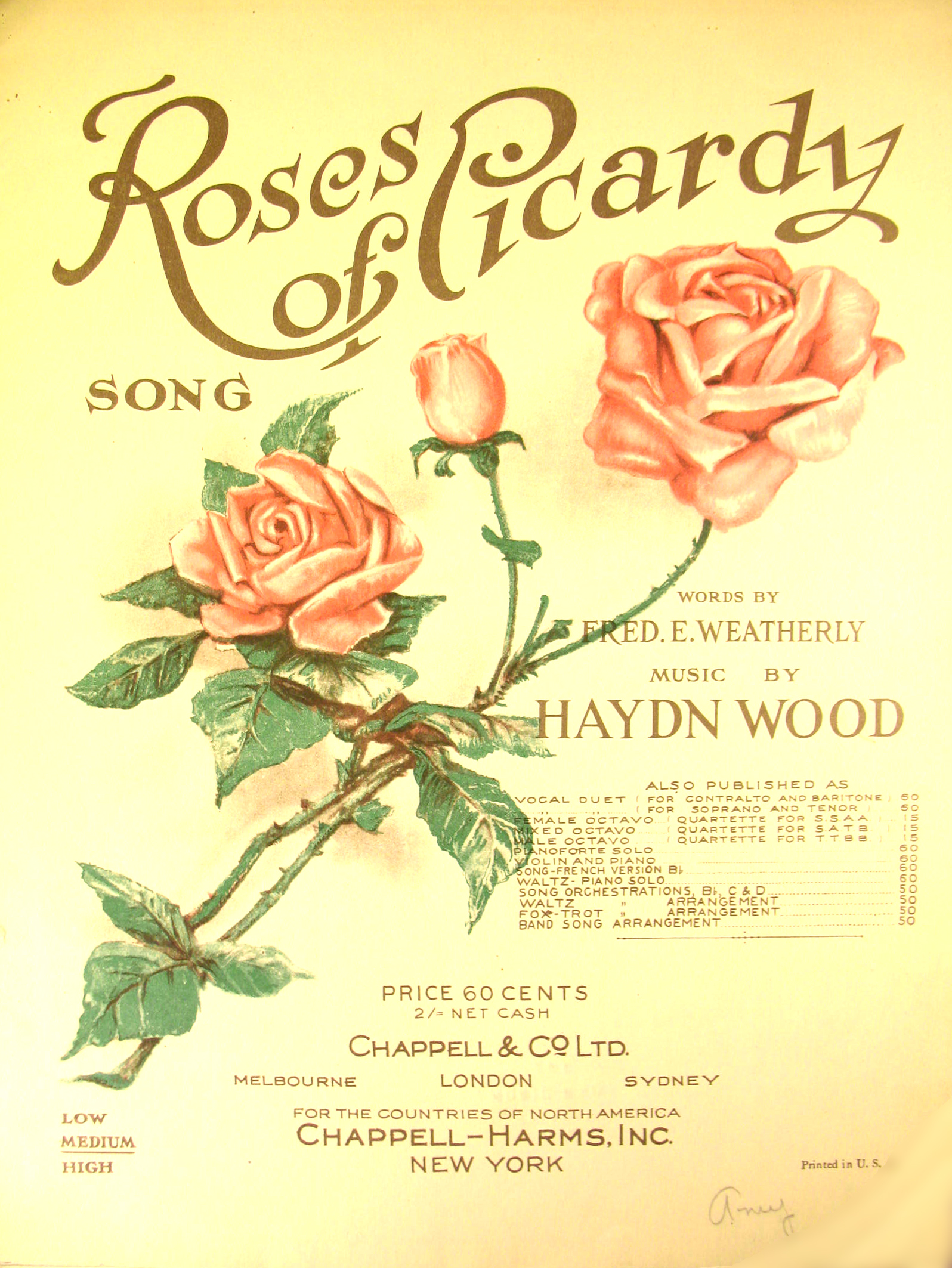
"Roses of Picardy": Sheet music from c. 1920

This strange title alludes to various things. "Côte de Nuits" is a French wine region located into the Burgundy wine region, renowned for its crus. "Picardy Roses" evokes Roses of Picardy, a popular British song composed in 1916; it was one of the most famous songs of the First World War. It is also a reference to the roses that the Red Baron deposits on the wreckage of planes he shoots down. Finally, this story takes place in the historical territory of Picardy.

In this story, contrasting with his sinister reputation, Manfred von Richthofen appears to be very attached to his mother. Pratt wanted to use some truthful elements about this historical figure. For example, he mentions the glorious track record of this flying ace, officially credited with 80 air combat victories. Other authentic elements include his custom of cutting the empennage of the planes he shot down, to make trophies, as well as that his aunt Frieda von Richthofen married the British novelist D. H. Lawrence.

At the end of this story, an airplane is seen flying, piloted by Hermann Göring, another air ace. He will later be infamous for working with Adolf Hitler.

=== Burlesque Between Zuydcoote and Bray-Dunes ===
==== Abstract ====
Again in France, between the cities of Zuydcoote and Bray-Dunes (Nord department), a show is performed in a Royal Air Force base by the puppeteer Rico-Rico and the singer Mélodie Gaël. Shortly after, Corto Maltese is talking with his friend Cain Groovesnore, who announces that his American cousin Pandora is going to marry. Corto, who loved her (cf. the story The Ballad of the Salty Sea), remains on a beach, thoughtful. But suddenly, he learns that Cain has been arrested, accused of having shot Lieutenant De Trécesson. Wanting to defend him, the sailor speaks with Commissaire Rothschild, in charge of the investigation. Together, they question the witnesses: Rico-Rico and Mélodie Gaël.

Gradually, they discover that, in reality, the lieutenant had found that Mélodie was a spy, in the service of the Germans. So he came to see her and accuse her. But she hypnotized Cain, also present, so that he would kill Trécesson. During the investigation, a fight ensues in which the artists killed each other. Ultimately, Cain is exonerated and Trécesson survives.

==== Analysis ====
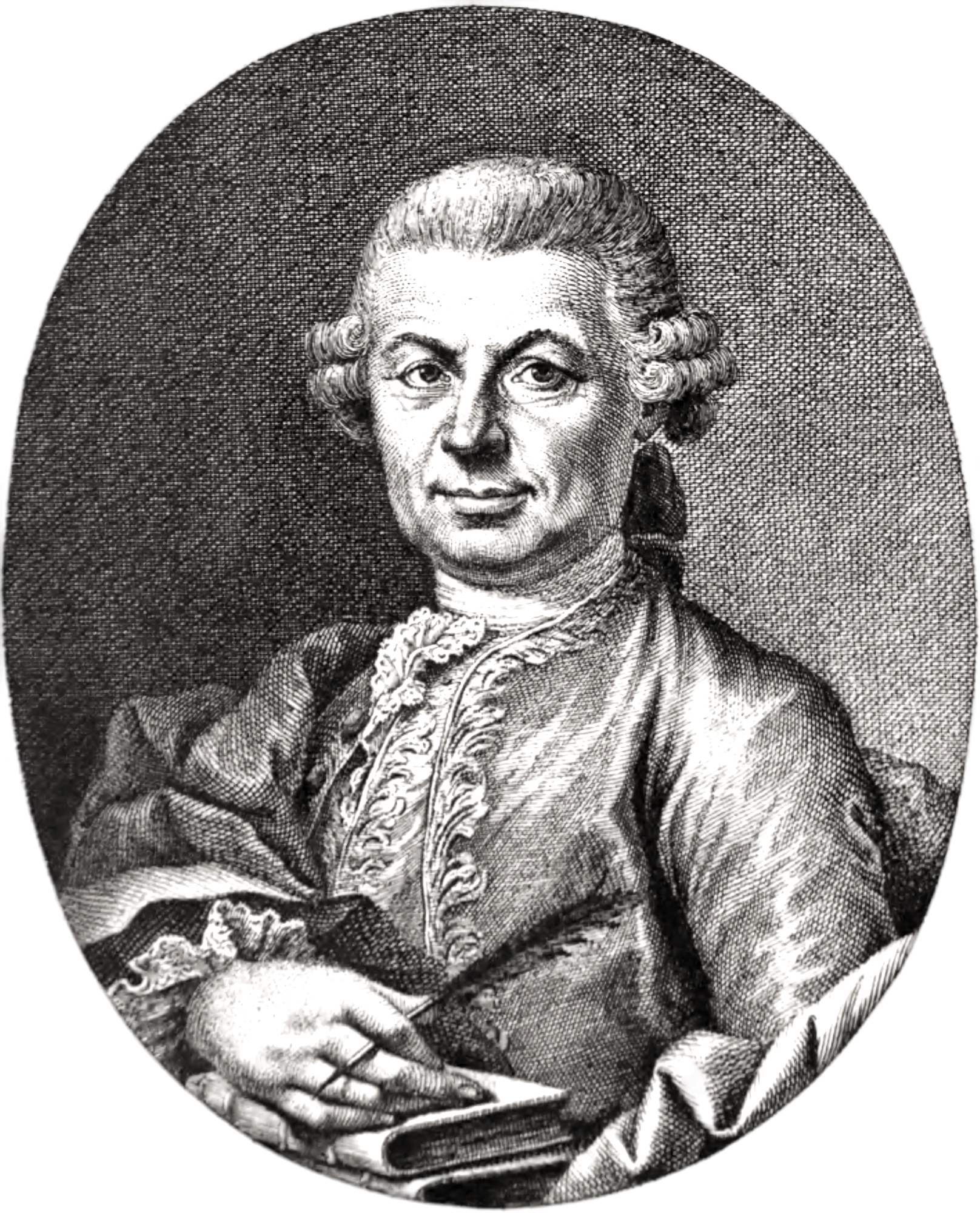
Carlo Gozzi

At the end of this story, Corto cynically declares to Rothschild that he came to France to drink French wines (an allusion to Château Lafite Rothschild wines). This, while he is in the midst of the massacres of war and witnessed murders. This sentence earned Pratt two cases of wine from the Rothschild family. In this regard, there was also talk of wine in the previous story.

Various cultural references punctuate this story. Thus, Lieutenant De Trécesson has the same name as the Château de Trécesson, near the Paimpont forest. This place is often associated with the forest of Brocéliande, an important location from Arthurian legend. Many places in this forest are mentioned: Val sans retour and the fountain of Barenton.

Rico-Rico comes from the Venetian Gozzi family. His name is the nickname of Carlo Gozzi, who was known for his stage interpretations of various legends.

== Artistic elements ==
=== Drawns ===
Hugo Pratt has produced numerous additional drawings of the characters and places relating to the stories in this album, as he did with other episodes of the series. Here, for example, he drew different places in Ireland and historical or legendary characters.

=== Poem on the cover ===
Among the many covers existing for Celtic Tales, one of them shows a poem in which Corto Maltese thanks different characters, mostly from Celtic legends:

- Merlin, the enchanter or wizard featured in Arthurian legend (like the followings three characters);
- Morgan le Fay and Viviane the Lady of the Lake;
- King Arthur;
- Oberon (king of the fairies) and Puck;
- The Irish leprechauns;
- The Cornish Pixies;
- The Scottish boggles;
- The Breton Korrigans;
- The Welsh miners, Wales being renowned for its coal industry;
- The French elves;
- The Druids of "Folle Pensée" (name of a locality in the Paimpont forest);
- The little folk of the forest of Brocéliande;
- The royal ravens of Stonehenge;
- W. B. Yeats, an Irish poet;
- And the harp of the wind somewhere to the north.

== Awards and tributes ==
=== Awards ===
Hugo Pratt won the "Prix Saint-Michel", for "Best Realistic Writing" in 1977, for the story A Midwinter Morning's Dream.

=== Tributes ===
Twenty years after the death of Hugo Pratt, his ex-assistant Lele Vianello, another Italian comic book creator, gave him a tribute album. Entitled "Twenty after ... Homage to Hugo Pratt", it includes drawings inspired by the story "A Midwinter Morning’s Dream", where Corto and characters from Celtic legends await Pratt on the day of his death to welcome him into their world.
