= Tombeau de Merlin =

Grave in Paimpont, France

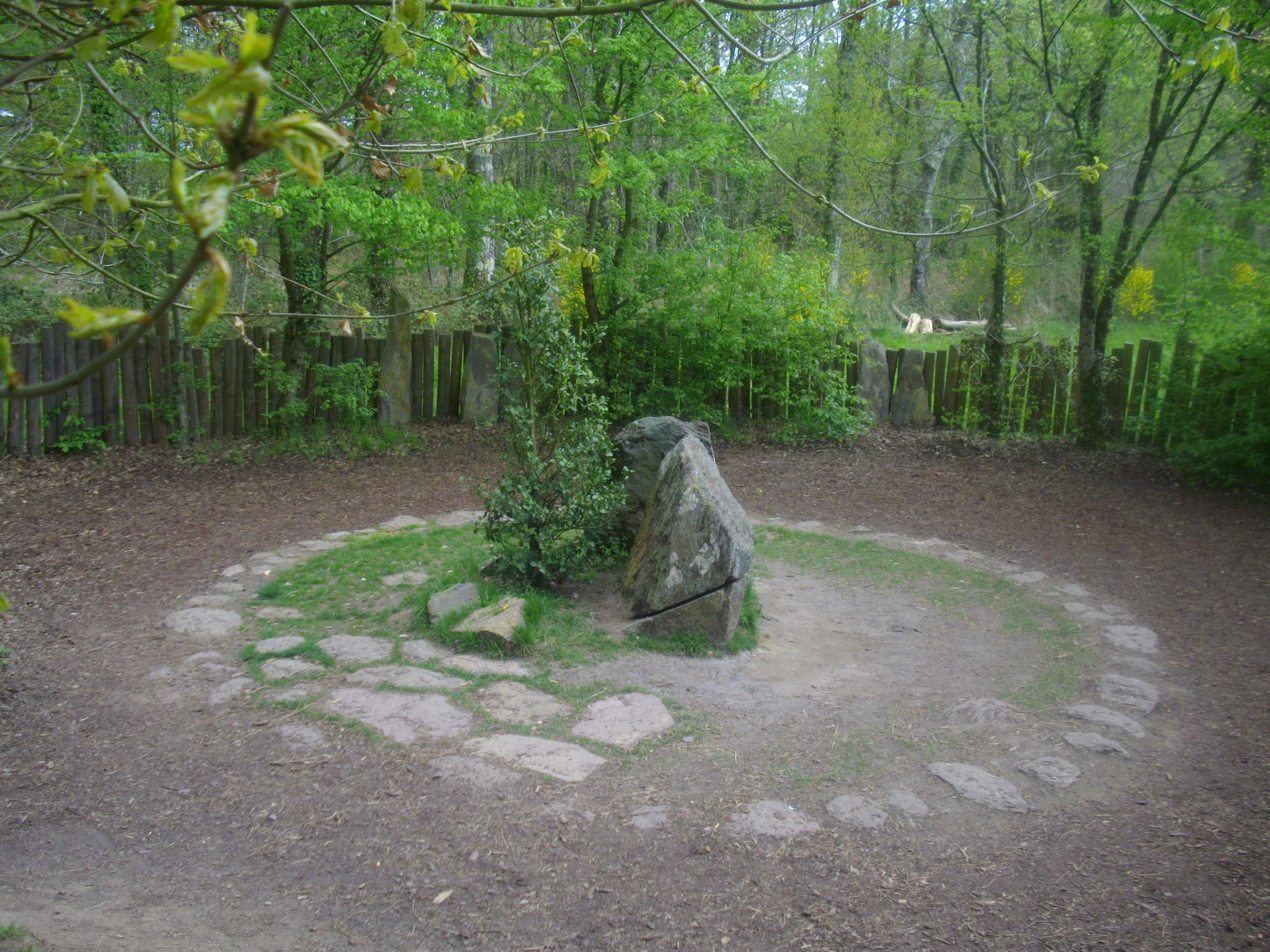
- Tombeau de Merlin in 2009

- Location in Brittany, France

General information
- Location: Brittany, France
- Coordinates: 48°04′40″N 02°07′03″W
- Years built: c. 4000 BC

Height
- Height: 1.5 meters

Dimensions
- Diameter: 10.5 meters

Technical details
- Material: Schist

The Tombeau de Merlin is a megalithic monument dating from the Neolithic period located in the Forest of Paimpont, at a place called La Marette near the hamlet of Landelles in Paimpont.

A tradition dating from the 12th century has it that Merlin had a tomb in the legendary forest of Brocéliande, Félix Bellamy defining its location in the forest in 1889. Shortly afterwards the Tombeau de Merlin was largely destroyed by grave robbers, but it has nevertheless become an important tourist site.

In Britain, Bardsey Island, Drumelzier and Marlborough also claim to have Merlin's grave.

== Megalithic construction ==
These are the ruins of a megalithic construction dating from the Neolithic era, of the gallery grave type. According to Félix Bellamy, there were originally two gallery graves; of these one, already in ruins, called the Tombeau de Merlin (the second was designated as the Tomb of Viviane) was the subject of a detailed description in the 1920s. It was 10.5 metres (34 ft) long and about 1.5 metres (4.9 ft) wide. The room was delimited by four orthostats on one side, only one on the other and a sixth slab acted as an apse. The height of these supports varied from 0.9 metres (3.0 ft) to 1.5 metres (4.9 ft), the width from 1.25 metres (4.1 ft) to 1.6 metres (5.2 ft) and the thickness from 0.25 metres (0.82 ft) to 0.4 metres (1.3 ft). The covering slabs had all collapsed. All the stones of the monument were of purple schist. Only three stones are now left. The only known graphic records of the full monument are two 19th-century engravings and an old postcard dated 1900. The Tombeau Merlin is listed on the Base Mérimée, the official French inventory of notable architecture and archaeological monuments.

== History ==
According to the Lancelot-Grail cycle of medieval romances, Merlin withdrew from the world because of his love for the fairy Viviane. In another version of the legend, he is locked up by Viviane in a cave. The poet Auguste Creuzé de Lesser wrote in 1811 that Merlin was buried in the forest of Brocéliande, a legendary forest whose precise location has never really been identified.

The modern history of Merlin's tomb begins in 1820, when a judge and scholar from Montfort-sur-Meu, J. C. D. Poignand, published an article in the Brochure des Antiquités Historiques in which he claimed that Merlin was buried in the Forest of Paimpont, in the commune of Saint-Malon-sur-Mel and near the abbey of Talhouet. For twenty years the inhabitants searched, hoping to find treasure there. In 1825, the writer Blanchard de la Musse associated a gallery grave in the north of the Forest of Paimpont with the tomb of Merlin. Théodore Hersart de la Villemarqué also located the tomb of Merlin in these places. An 1846 Romantic engraving from the Magasin pittoresque shows a stone circle, non-existent in the Forest of Paimpont, named Tombeau de Merlin and located in the forest of Brocéliande.

The topography of the Forest of Paimpont was defined by Félix Bellamy in 1889. His research, based on Poignand's article and the statements of the inhabitants, led him to settle on this gallery grave as the location of the tomb. In 1892, grave robbers digging for the hypothetical treasure of the enchanter destroyed the blocks they could not move.

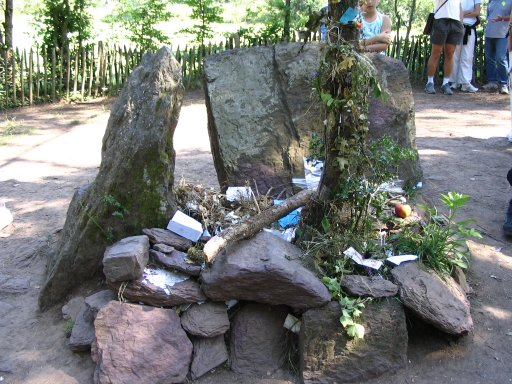
The Tombeau de Merlin bestrewn with offerings recording the wishes of visitors

Tourist development of Paimpont-Brocéliande began at the same time, though not altogether supported by the local inhabitants. In the 1970s, the Breton writer Yann Brekilien opposed the construction of access roads and the loss of the legendary character of Paimpont-Brocéliande. It was not until the 1990s that a promotion policy was put in place thanks to the mayor of Ploërmel and the Centre de l'Imaginaire Arthurien, allowing guided tours and the establishment of a protective perimeter around the tomb of Merlin. In 2008, the European LEADER programme promoted the restoration of the site, which was in an advanced state of disrepair, and the creation of a tourist footpath known as the "Enchanter's Loop" – a circuit including the Tombeau de Merlin and the Fontaine de Jouvence (Fountain of Youth).

== Contemporary folklore ==
Visitors often leave pieces of paper in the middle of the monument on which they write the wishes they wish to see granted by Merlin. The ashes of the dead are also sometimes scattered there.
