= Celtic Tales =

Celtic Tales may refer to:

- Celtic Tales (Corto Maltese), a graphic novel in the Corto Maltese series, by Hugo Pratt
- Celtic Tales: Balor of the Evil Eye, a videogame
- Celtic mythology
