= Hotié de Viviane =

Megalithic tomb in Brittany, France

- Hostié de Viviane, Maison de Viviane, Tombeau de Viviane, or Tombeau des druides
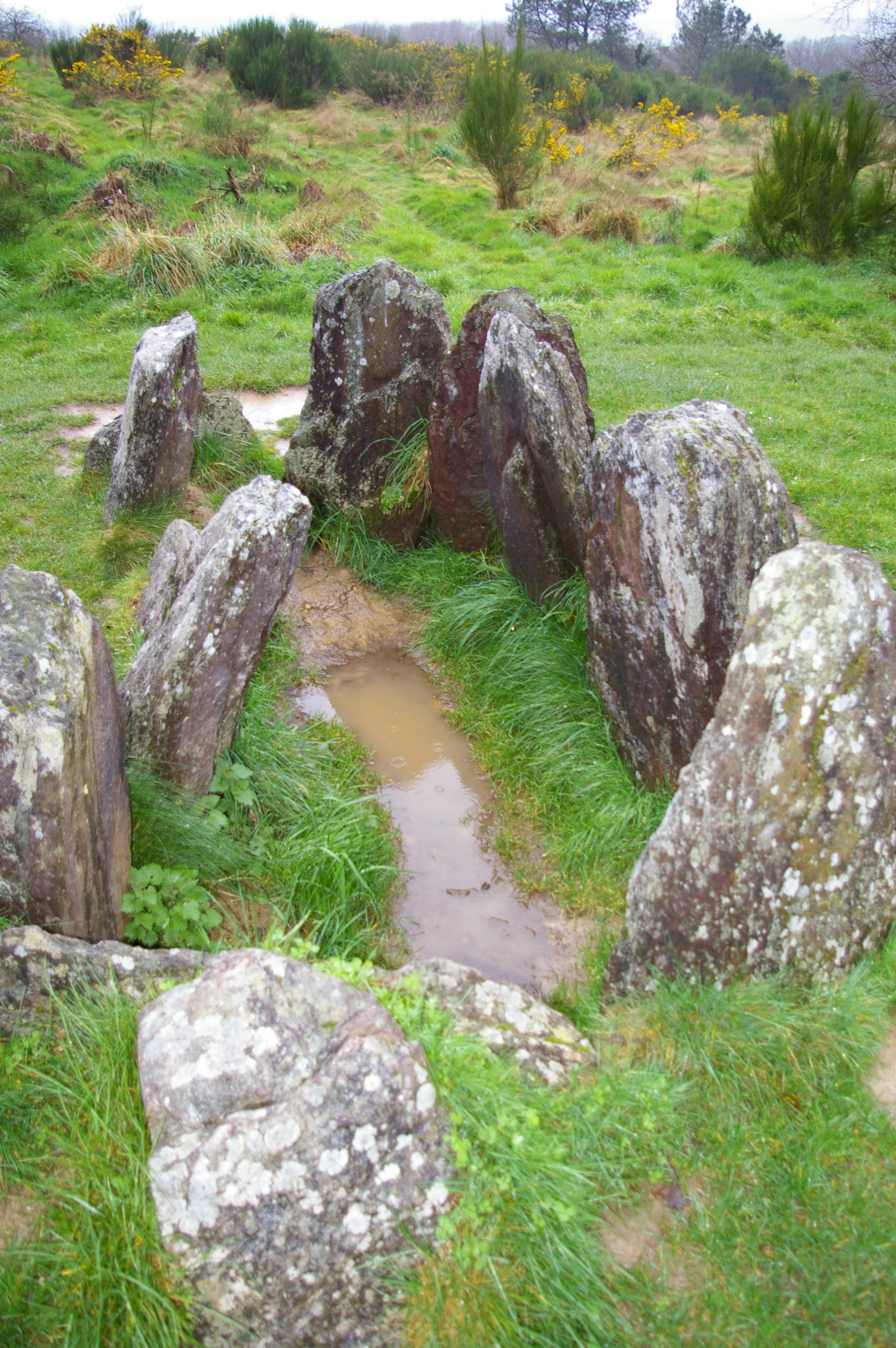
- The tomb in 2008
- Interactive map of Hotié de Viviane
- 47°59′59″N 02°16′06″W
- Type: Chamber tomb
- Location: Paimpont, Brittany, France

History
- Built: c. 3120 BC

Site notes
- Material: Schist
- Height: 1.4 metres (4.6 ft)
- Length: 2.9 metres (9.5 ft)
- Width: 1.5 or 1.6 metres (4.9 or 5.2 ft)

Hotié, Hostié or Maison de Viviane (English: House of Viviane), also known as Tombeau des Druides (English: Druids' Tomb) is a megalithic tomb in Paimpont, Ille-et-Vilaine, in Brittany. The Hotié de Viviane is one of the prehistoric monuments in the Forest of Brocéliande cursorily described in the 19th century, but more recently, following the fires that have periodically devastated the forest, rediscovered and excavated by local groups. Legend makes it the home of the fairy Viviane, where she held the enchanter Merlin imprisoned. Another legend equates it with the esplumoir Merlin. When the location of the Val sans retour, a place figuring in medieval Arthurian literature, was identified with the Val de Rauco in the 19th century, the megalithic site near the Gurvant valley took the name of Hotié de Viviane. Hotié de Viviane is also sometimes identified as Tombeau de Viviane (English: Tomb of Viviane).

== Location ==
This megalithic construction is located south-west of the Paimpont forest. It is possible to reach it by passing through the village of Beauvais, heading towards the Rauco moor. It appears after the last houses of La Guette, overlooking the Val sans retour, on a hill at a height of approximately 191 metres (627 ft).

== Megalithic architecture ==
This is one of the rare funerary coffers under a tumulus in a region where tombs of the same period usually have covered passages. It was excavated from 1982-1983. The tumulus that covered the coffer was made up of small stones held in place by slabs, 80 centimetres (2.6 ft) to 1.6 metres (5.2 ft) long, driven diagonally at an angle of 45° about 15 centimetres (6 in) into the ground. The actual coffer is surrounded by 12 red schist slabs delimiting a funerary chamber 2.9 metres (9.5 ft) long by 1.5 to 1.6 metres (4.9 to 5.2 ft) wide and not exceeding 1.4 metres (4.6 ft) high. It must have been covered by other slabs which have since disappeared, having been destroyed by treasure hunters.

The dead were probably deposited there on the south side, passing through a lower slab. The funerary furniture found consisted of polished dolerite axes, flints, jewellery pendants, coarse late Neolithic ceramics, millstones, hammerstones, and grinding wheels. The whole construction has been dated between 3500 and 2500 BC. Carbon-14 dating of charcoal found on site refined the estimate to between 3355 and 2890 BC.

== Legend ==
Over time, the site's original name of Tombeau des druides was supplanted by that of Hotié de Viviane because this place was, according to legend, the refuge of the fairy Viviane. As with most of the legendary place-names of the forest of Paimpont, this one was first associated with Arthurian legend by the Celtomane and Romantic Blanchard de La Musse. This monument's connection with Viviane was later affirmed by Félix Bellamy in 1896: "It is said that it was there, on a hill above the Val sans Retour, amid woods and rocks, in his castle of stone, that Viviane held Merlin bewitched."
