= Château de Trécesson =

Medieval castle in Brittany, France

Coordinates: 47°58′32″N 2°16′26″W

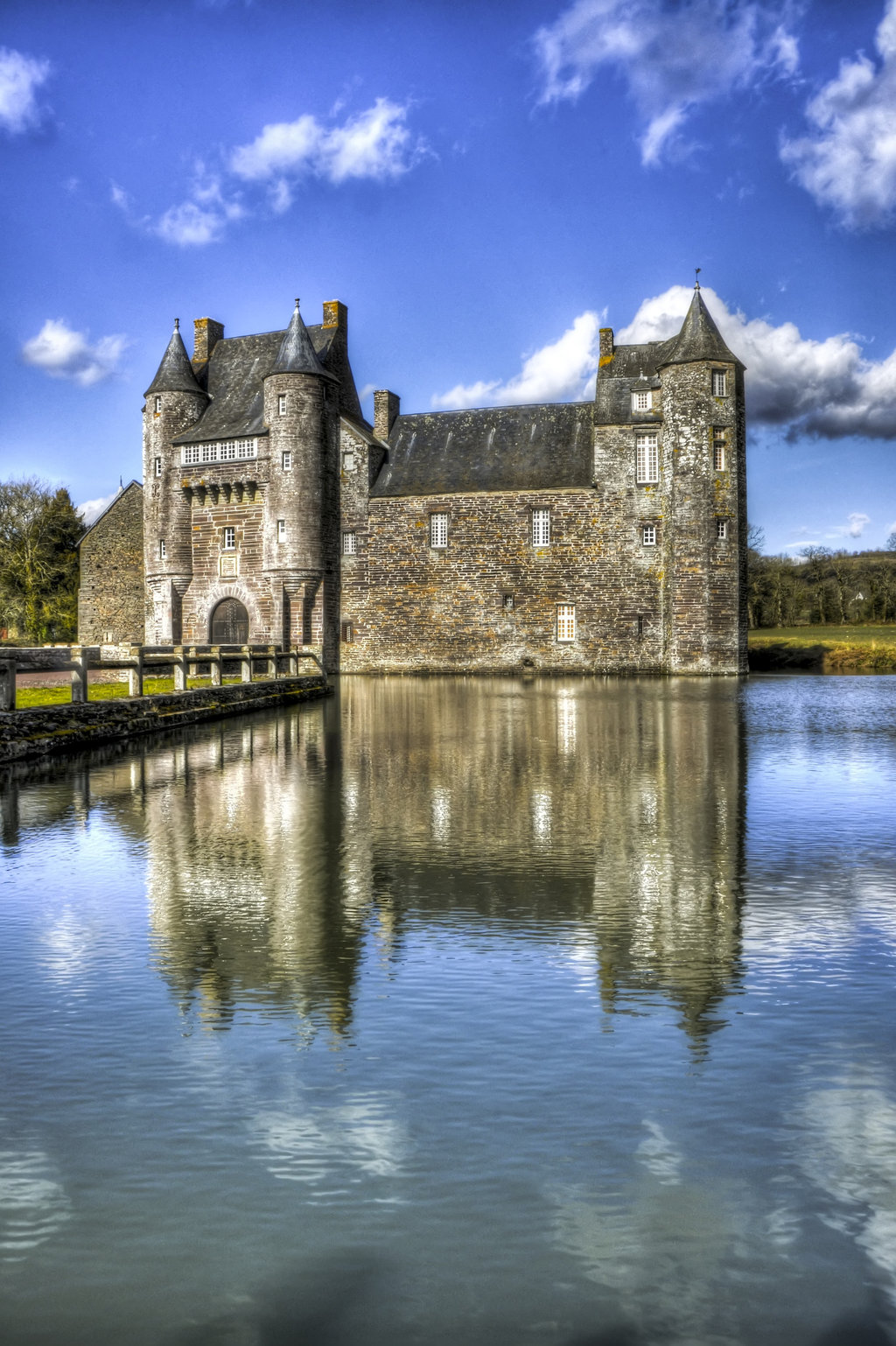
The Château de Trécesson in 2012

The Château de Trécesson (Breton: Kastell Treseson) is a medieval castle in the Brittany region of France. It is located in the commune of Campénéac near the Paimpont forest and on the edge of the military camp of Coëtquidan. It is a private property. It has been listed since 2012 as a monument historique by the French Ministry of Culture.

== Architecture ==
The castle's imposing reddish schist walls are reflected in the waters of the lake which surrounds it. The front gate is reached by a bridge which spans the moat. The entry is guarded by an imposing gatehouse flanked by two narrow towers on corbelling, joined together by an old gallery with machicolations. On the right, a long almost windowless frontage, covered with a steep slate roof, ends in a hexagonal corner tower. Around the trapezoidal inner courtyard, to the right is a corps de logis of more recent vintage, undoubtedly 18th-century; and on the left stand the domestic buildings, protected by a watchtower on the exterior facade, and a small 15th-century seigneurial chapel.

== History ==
The origin of Trécesson castle is lost in the mists of time. It was mentioned as the seat of the lords of Ploërmel and Campénéac from the 8th century. The Trécesson family is documented since the 13th century and its first known representative was the knight Jean de Trécesson, whose grandson was Constable of Brittany in the 14th century. Tradition places the construction of the site at the end of the 14th century, but it is more probable that the castle, in its present position, dates from the 15th century. At that time, around 1440, the last Trécesson heiress married Éon de Carné. He and his son François added the name of Trécesson to their own and undertook the transformation and rebuilding of the château.

The residence remained the property of the Carné-Trécesson family until 1773, when the last of that line, Agathe de Trécesson, married Rene-Joseph Le Preste de Châteaugiron. The château passed in 1793 to Nicolas Bourelle de Sivry, and subsequently to the Perrien, Montesquieu and the Prunelé families. The countess de Prunelé lives in the château today.

In June 1793, during the Reign of Terror following the French Revolution, the Girondist deputy Jacques Defermon (known as Defermon des Chapelières), having signed a protest against the exclusion of the Gironde faction, was obliged to flee and took refuge in the château, where he remained hidden for over a year.

== Legends ==
Several legends are attached to the castle. The best known is that of the Dames Blanches.

== See also ==
- List of castles in France
