= Brocéliande =

Mythical medieval forest

- Matter of Britain location
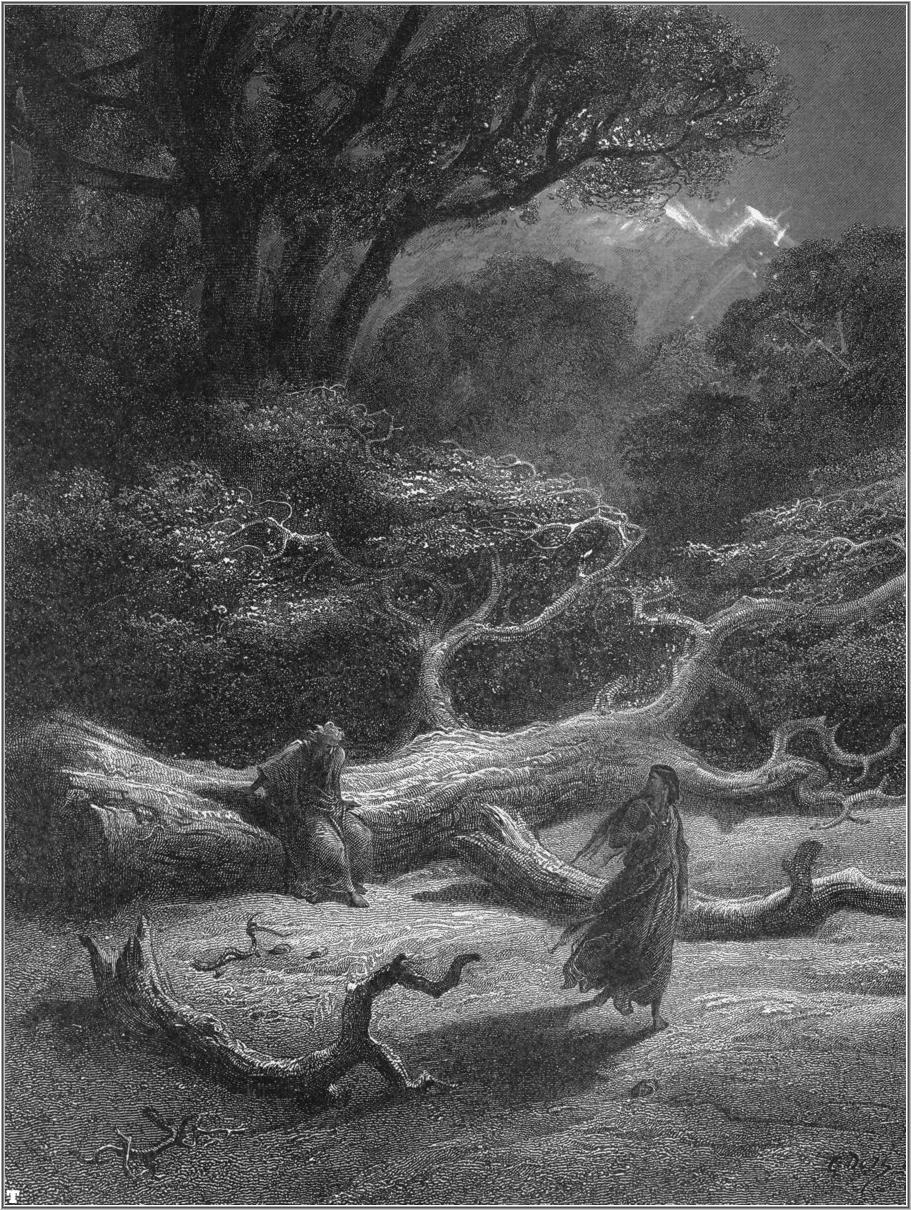
- Merlin and Viviane in Brocéliande. Gustave Doré's illustration for Idylls of the King (1868)
- Genre: Historical fantasy

In-universe information
- Other names: Brecheliant, Brecilien
- Type: Enchanted forest
- Locations: Val sans retour
- Characters: Lady of the Lake, Merlin, Morgan, Knights of the Round Table

Brocéliande, earlier known as Brécheliant and Brécilien, is a legendary enchanted forest that had a reputation in the medieval European imagination as a place of magic and mystery. Brocéliande is featured in several medieval texts, mostly relating to the Arthurian legend, as well as in numerous modern works.

Brocéliande first appeared in literature in Wace's 1160 chronicle Roman de Rou that reported on the fanciful tales surrounding its location in Brittany. It is a place of legend due to its uncertain location, unusual weather, and its ties with Arthurian mythology, most notably the tomb of Merlin. In chivalric romance lore, the forest sheltered Morgan's magical Vale of No Return, the faery fountain of Barenton, and the place of Merlin's retirement, imprisonment, or death. Today, it is most commonly identified as Paimpont forest in Brittany, France.

== Etymology ==
The etymology is uncertain. The oldest known form, Brecheliant, could be based on the Celtic Brec'h (hill), followed by a man's name. The later form of Brocéliande could be derived from bro (meaning country in Breton, Cornish and Welsh), but this variant does not appear until the 12th century, in the work of Chrétien de Troyes. A popular etymology from Old French derives the term ultimately from "broce" for "forest" and "liande" for "heath".

== Medieval historical accounts ==
First known literary mention of Brocéliande is found in Roman de Rou, a c. 1160 chronicle Anglo-Norman poet Wace, which covers the history of the Dukes of Normandy from the time of Rollo of Normandy to the battle of Tinchebray. However, a reference to "Briscelim sinus Armoricus" occurs in Bernardus Silvestris's Cosmographia (Megacosmus 3, line 353), which was read to Pope Eugene III in 1147-48.

Wace numbers the Bretons from Brocéliande (Brecheliant), about whom there are many legends ("ceux de Brecheliant dont les Bretons disent maintes légendes..."), along with the Breton knights. Wace gives the name of the fountain of Barenton ("La fontaine de Berenton/sort d'une part lez le perron...") and describes how hunters scoop water from it and wet a stone in order to summon rain; he also mentions rumors of fairies and magic. Wace travelled to Brittany in search of these wonders, but found nothing notable and left disappointed: "I saw the forest and the land and looked for marvels, but found none. I came back as a fool and went as a fool. I went as a fool and came back as a fool. I sought foolishness and considered myself a fool."

Brocéliande is briefly mentioned in one historical text in Bertran de Born's 1183 poem dedicated to Geoffrey II, Duke of Brittany – the duke to whom Brocéliande belonged. Its unusual weather alone is noted in a handful of texts: Giraldus Cambrensis's c. 1185 expeditionary account, Topographia Hibernica, Alexandre Neckham's c. 1195 work on nautical science, De naturis rerum, and William the Breton's c. 1215 poem, Philippide.

== Arthurian legend ==
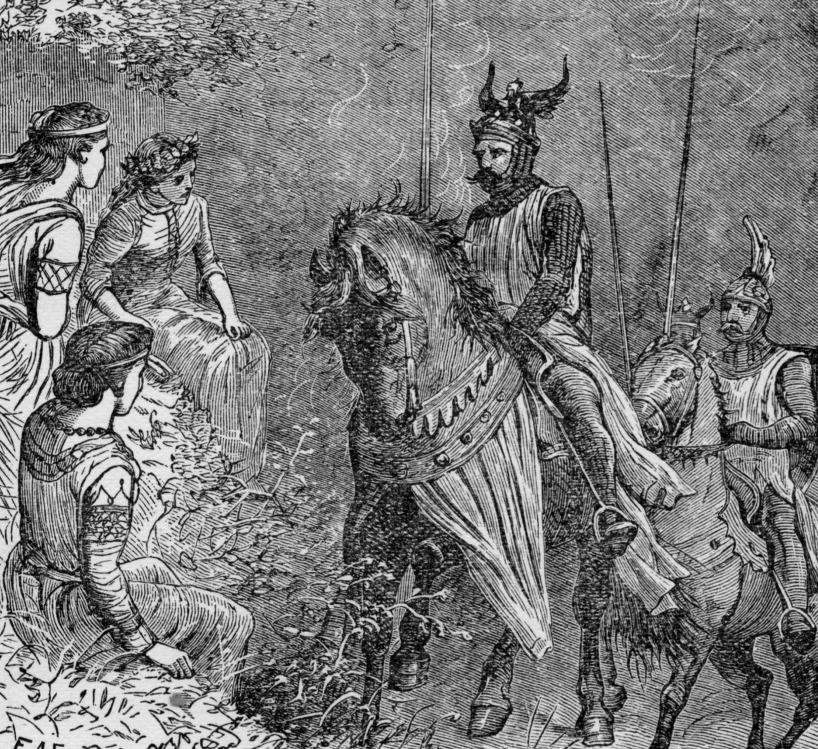
The Damsels at the Fountain, F. A. Fraser's illustration for King Arthur and His Knights of the Round Table (1912)

In the 1170s, Chrétien de Troyes mentions the forest of Brocéliande in his Arthurian romance, Le Chevalier au lion. While in Brocéliande, Yvain pours water from a spring into a stone, causing a violent storm to erupt. This in turn summons the knight Esclados le Ros who defends the forest.

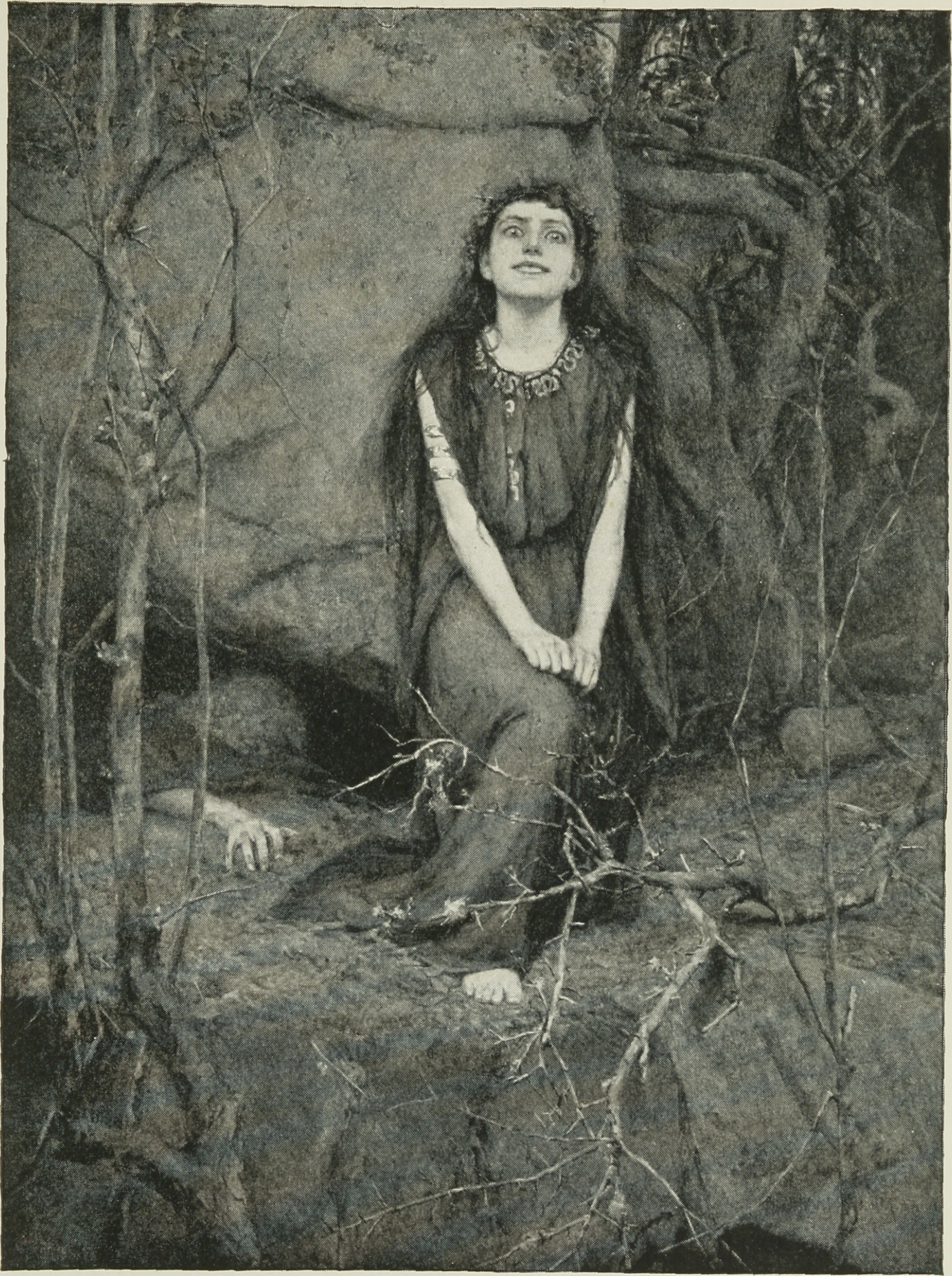
Merlin and Vivien by Henry Meynell Rheam (1895)

In the late 12th or early 13th century, Robert de Boron first associates the figure of Merlin with Brocéliande in his poem Merlin. It is also featured in several episodes of the prose adaptations and continuations of the poem, the Vulgate Cycle (Lancelot-Grail), notably in the stories of Merlin and Viviane. Later, Morgan le Fay traps many unfaithful knights in her Val sans retour within Brocéliande until they are freed by Lancelot.

In Jaufré, the Arthurian romance of unknown authorship composed in Catalonia, the forest of Brocéliande is near King Arthur's palace and the site of a mill where Arthur battles a strange bull-like animal, really a shapeshifting mage knight. The dating of Jaufré is debated and may have been written as early as 1183 or as late as 1225–1228. Later, Brocéliande also appears in context of Arthurian knights in Huon de Méry's allegorical poem Tournoiement Antecrist as well as in other texts such as Claris et Laris, where it is the site of Morgan's fairy castle, and Brun de la Montagne.

== Location ==
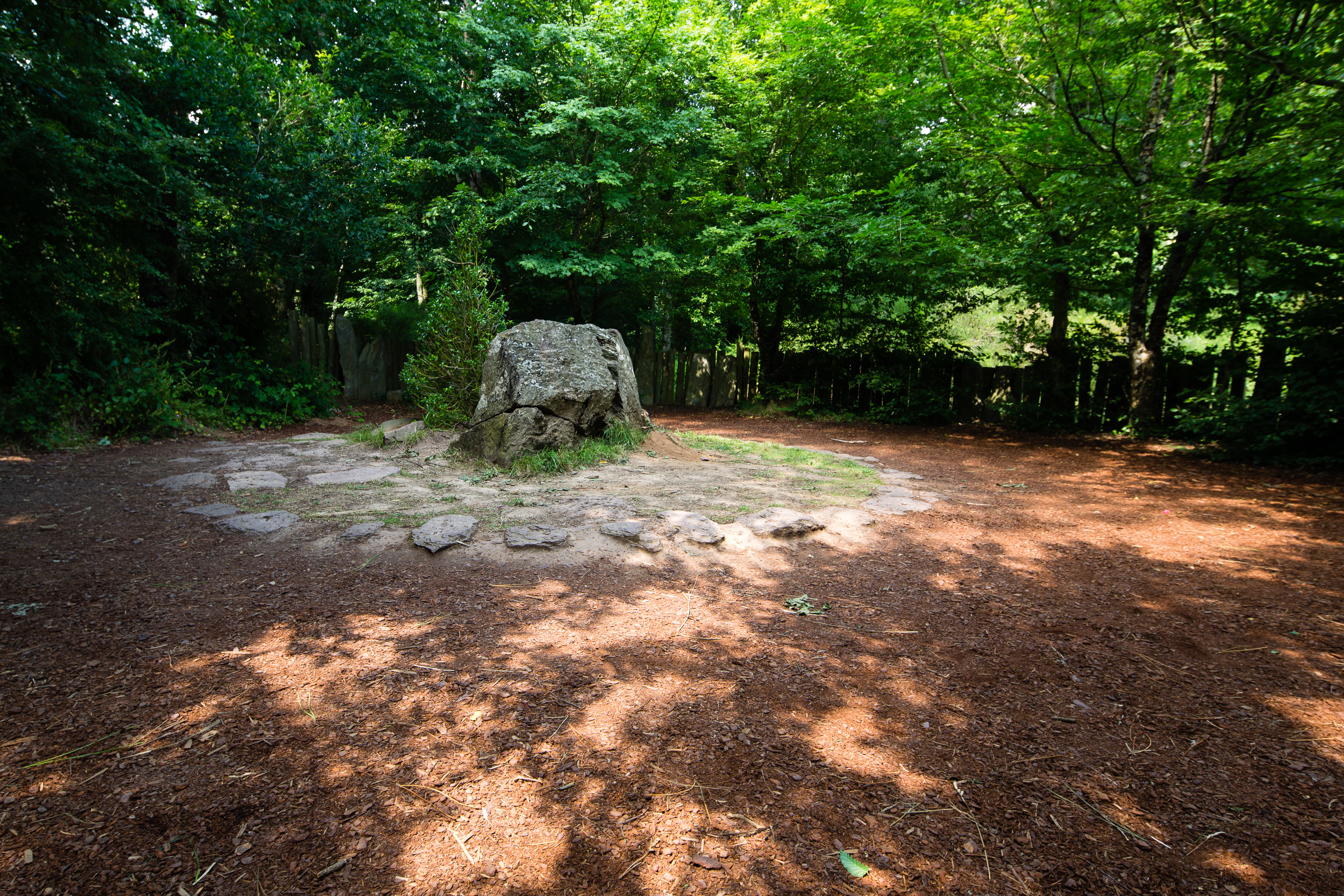
Merlin's tomb (tombeau de Merlin) megalith within Paimpont forest

Early source works provide unclear or conflicting information on the exact location of Brocéliande; different hypotheses exist to place Brocéliande on the map. According to Wace, Brocéliande is in Brittany. Since the 15th century (Jean Cabaret d'Orville), Brocéliande has been linked by some to the forest of Lorge near Quintin in Brittany. Since around 1400 (Ponthus et Sidoine, where the forest is named Berthelien) and commonly in modern times, Brocéliande is considered to be Paimpont forest in Brittany.

Some scholars think that Brocéliande is a mythological place and has never existed. Jean Markale notes that while the forest itself is legendary, it is part of the "remainder of the immense forest that covered the entire center of Brittany until the High Middle Ages." He goes on to point out that the notion of a magical forest in France has its roots in the writings of Lucan who describes a numinous, magical forest full of ominous happenings in Gaul.

William A. Young argues that Chrétien de Troyes' Le Chevalier au lion is derived from earlier tales which have their origins in the post-Roman Brythonic kingdoms beyond Hadrian's Wall in Britain, and suggests that there is a strong case for equating Broceliande with the forest of Celython, also known as the Great Wood of Caledon.

== Modern fiction ==
=== Arthurian ===
Brocéliande has continued to appear throughout the modern Arthuriana, in works such as the 19th-century poem Idylls of the King by Alfred, Lord Tennyson, and in later works such as Edwin Arlington Robinson's 1917 poem Merlin and Alan Seeger's 1916 poem Brocéliande.

- Jean Lorrain wrote the play Brocéliande (1898), about Myrddhin (Merlin) and Viviane (Nimue/Elaine); as in many of the earlier Arthurian works, Brocéliande is the location where Viviane entraps Merlin inside an oak tree.
- In Bernard Cornwell's Arthurian trilogy The Warlord Chronicles, Broceliande is one of two British (Celtic) kingdoms that form modern-day Brittany, the other being Armorica.
- Brocéliande serves as the location of Robert Holdstock's fantasy novel Merlin's Wood.
- The poetry of Charles Williams, and its interpretation by C. S. Lewis in "Taliessin Through Logres, The Region of the Summer Stars, Arthurian Torso" (1974) is steeped in the imagery of Broceliande, "the sea-rooted western wood."

=== Other ===
The name was an inspiration for J.R.R. Tolkien's fictional realm of Beleriand in Middle-earth. The name Broseliand was used in the early sketches of The Silmarillion (1926 to 1930). It is also the setting of Tolkien's poem The Lay of Aotrou and Itroun.

Several short stories in Sylvia Townsend Warner's collection Kingdoms of Elfin (many of which appeared in The New Yorker in the 1970s) are set in Brocéliande or mention it, among several other enchanted forests where Townsend's Elfin folk live.

== See also ==
- Locations associated with Arthurian legend

== Sources ==
- Eckhardt, Caroline D. (May 2009). "Reading Jaufré: Comedy and Interpretation in a Medieval Cliff-Hanger". The Comparatist 33: 40–62.
- Lupack, Alan (2007). The Oxford guide to Arthurian Literature and Legend (1st paperback ed.). New York, NY: Oxford University Press USA. ISBN 978-0-19-921509-6.
- Markale, Jean (1995). Merlin: Priest of Nature (1st English translated ed.). Rochester, VT: Inner Traditions International. ISBN 0-89281-517-5.
