= Paimpont =

Paimpont Penpont (Gallo) Pempont (Breton)
- Commune
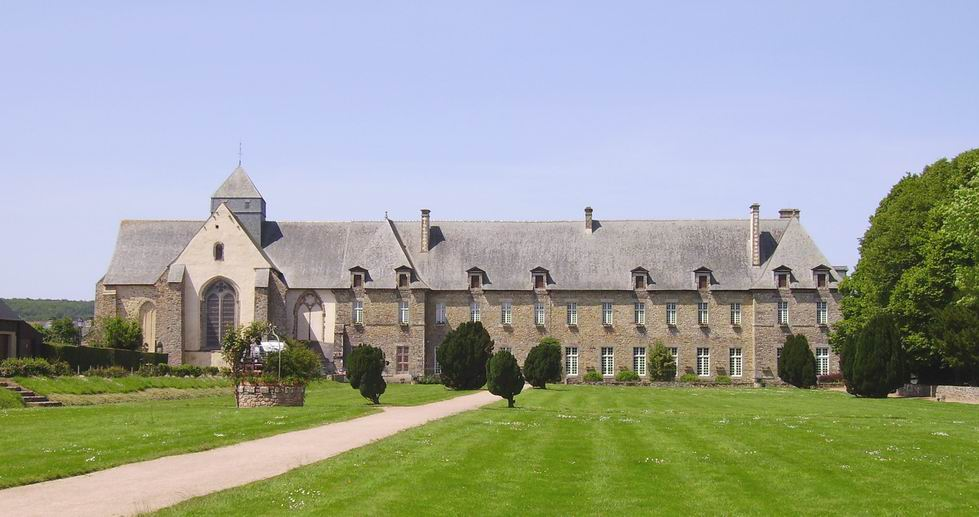
- Abbey

- Coat of arms
- Location of Paimpont
- Location within France Location within Brittany
- Coordinates: 48°01′08″N 2°10′11″W
- Country: France
- Region: Brittany
- Department: Ille-et-Vilaine
- Arrondissement: Rennes
- Canton: Montfort-sur-Meu
- Intercommunality: Brocéliande

Government
  - Mayor (2020–2026): Alain Lefeuvre
- Area^{1}: 110.28 km^{2} (42.58 sq mi)
- Elevation: 160 m (520 ft)
- Highest elevation: 258 m (846 ft)
- Lowest elevation: 62 m (203 ft)
- Population (2023): 1,772
  - Density: 16.07/km^{2} (41.62/sq mi)
- Time zone: UTC+01:00 (CET)
  - Summer (DST): UTC+02:00 (CEST)
- INSEE/Postal code: 35211 /35380
- ^{1} French Land Register data, which excludes lakes, ponds, glaciers > 1 km^{2} (0.386 sq mi or 247 acres) and river estuaries.

Paimpont (French pronunciation: [pɛ̃pɔ̃]; Breton: Pempont; Gallo: Penpont) is a commune in the Ille-et-Vilaine department in Brittany in northwestern France.

The name is a compound of Old Breton pen "head" and the Latin borrowing pont "bridge" and is first attested in the 9th century in the Latinised form Caput Pontis and then in 870 CE as Penpont. The town grew up around the abbey of Our Lady of Paimpont, which was founded by the Breton king and Catholic saint Judicael in 645 CE on the shore of a small lake now known as the Étang de Paimpont.

== Population ==
Inhabitants of Paimpont are called Paimpontais in French.

Historical population
Year	Pop.	±% p.a.
1968	1,714	—
1975	1,559	−1.34%
1982	1,449	−1.04%
1990	1,385	−0.56%
1999	1,395	+0.08%
2007	1,636	+2.01%
2012	1,622	−0.17%
2017	1,711	+1.07%
2023	1,772	+0.59%
Source: INSEE

== See also ==
- Paimpont forest
- Communes of the Ille-et-Vilaine department
