= Paimpont forest =

Temperate forest in Brittany, France

Coordinates: 48°01′N 2°10′W

Paimpont forest Forêt de Paimpont / Brocéliande Koad Pempont
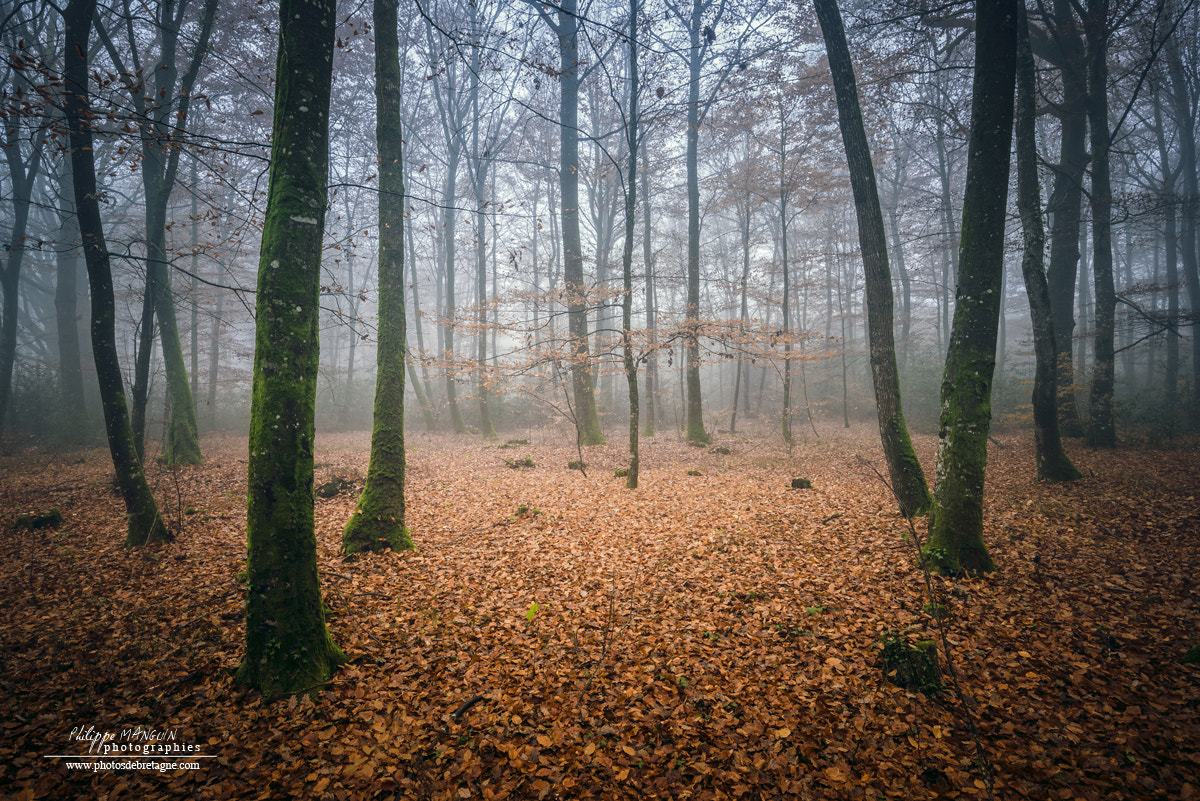
- Interactive map of Paimpont forest

Geography
- Location: Around Ille-et-Vilaine, Brittany, France
- Area: 9,000 hectares (2010)

Administration
- Authority: Mostly private, a small part under the ONF

Ecology
- Ecosystem: Temperate broadleaf and mixed forest

Paimpont Forest (French: Forêt de Paimpont, Breton: Koad Pempont), also known as Brocéliande Forest (French: Forêt de Brocéliande), is a temperate forest located around the village of Paimpont in the department of Ille-et-Vilaine in Brittany, France. Covering an area of 9,000 hectares, it is part of a larger forest area that covers the neighboring departments of Morbihan and Côtes-d'Armor. It contains the castles Château de Comper and Château de Trécesson as well as the Forges of Paimpont, a national historical site. It has been associated with the forest of Brocéliande and many locations from Arthurian legend, including the Val sans retour, the tomb of Merlin, and the fountain of Barenton.

== Geography and ecosystem ==
Area map

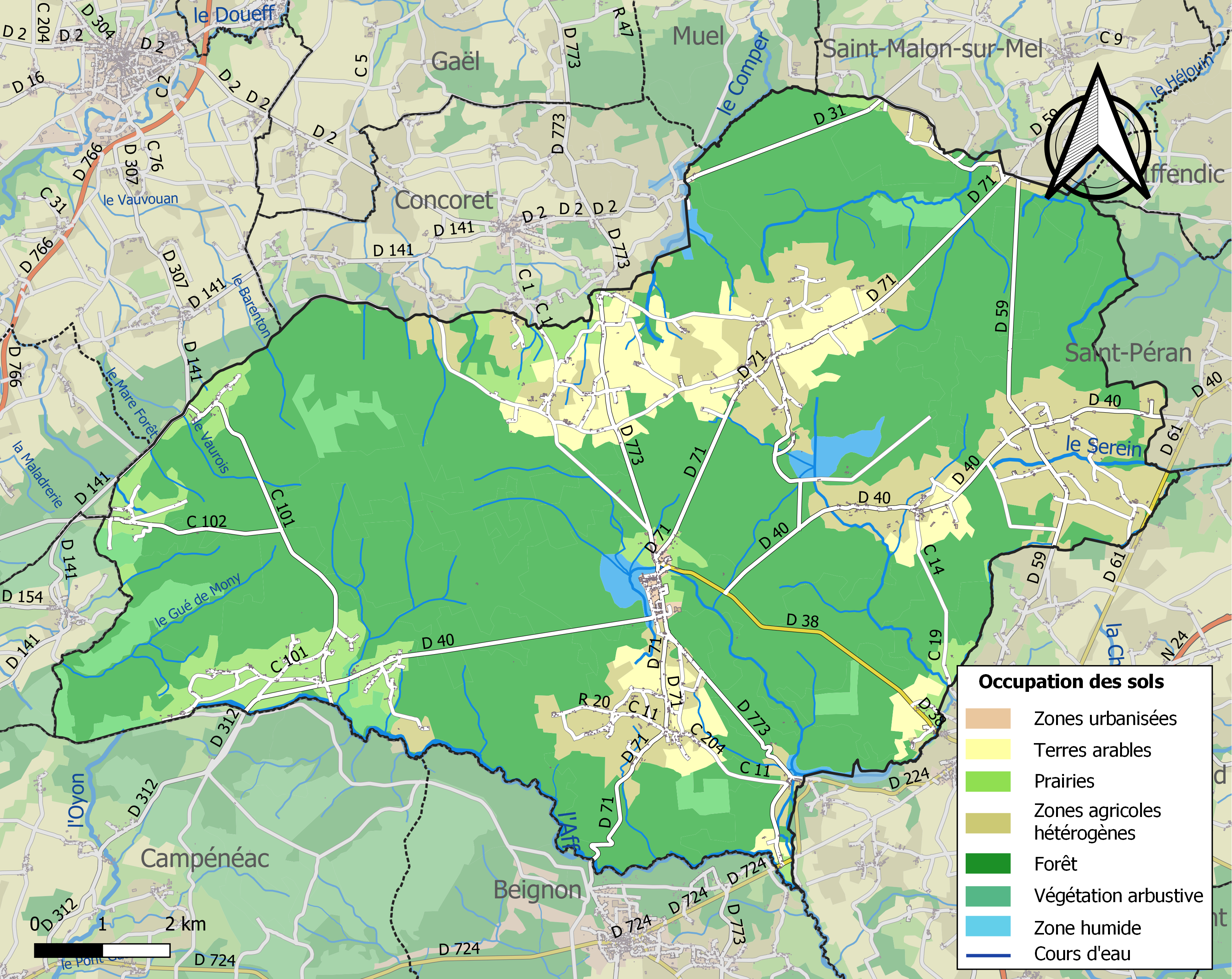
Geographic map of Paimpont

The forest is located in the northwestern French region of Brittany, about 30 km southwest of the city of Rennes. It occupies mainly the territory of the commune of Paimpont but extends to bordering communes in the departments of Ille-et-Vilaine and Morbihan, mainly Guer and Beignon in the south, Saint-Péran in the northeast, and Concoret in the north.

The woodland surrounding Paimpont is the remains of a denser and much larger forest. It is mainly a broadleaved forest, mostly oaks and beech, with areas of conifers either inside after clear-felling or on the periphery as a transition to moorland, for example towards the west in the area of Tréhorenteuc and the Val sans retour. The relative altitude of the forested massif helps produce a climate close to the oceanic climate of the Finistère coast. This, in addition to west and southwest winds that carry clouds and rain, supports ample vegetation. The surplus of water feeds the many brooks at the bottoms of small valleys before flowing into the river Aff, then into the Vilaine, and on to the area around Redon in the south of Ille-et-Vilaine.

The road from Forges to Concoret, which goes north through Paimpont, separates the western "high forest" (haute forêt) and the eastern "low forest", both of comparable size. In the high forest, the altitude decreases regularly from the highest point to 258 m, regularly offering views southwest towards the department of Morbihan; similarly, to the north are views towards the commune of Mauron on the edge of Côtes-d'Armor.

== History ==
Paimpont Forest was known as Brocélien in the 15th century. In Breton, it was called Brec'Helean. It has been repeatedly logged for construction needs of the city of Rennes, in particular in the 15th century. Because of its importance, the forest was put under royal jurisdiction.

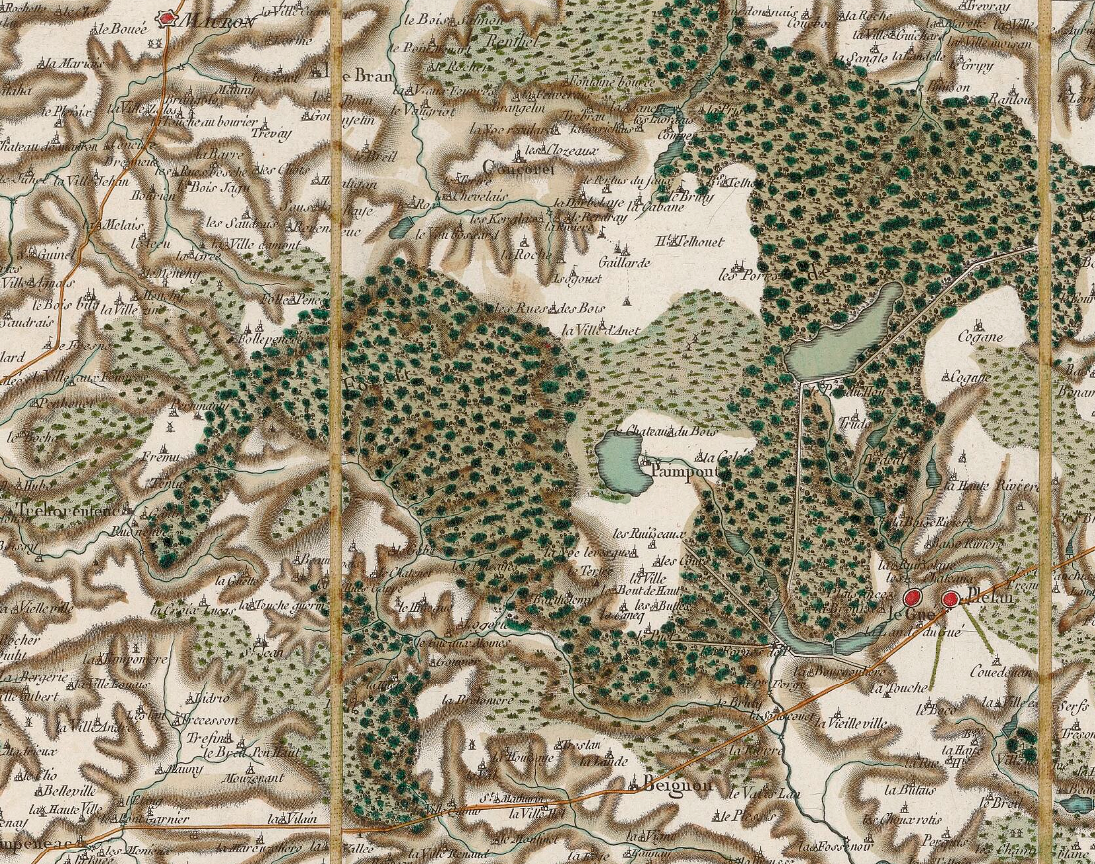
Historical map (1785)

The Forges of Paimpont were the most important wood-fueled forges of Brittany, operating from the 16th century until the end of the 19th century. Their location was enabled by the proximity of an open-cast deposit of iron ore at Gelée (a site near the village of Paimpont), the existence of a major river system, and the easy supply of locally produced charcoal. The forest was overexploited for the needs of the forges.

During the French Revolution, the abolition of protection triggered massive clear-cutting of the forest as the wood was excessively exploited to power the blast furnaces of local industry, which employed charcoal. In 1804, the prefect of the department wrote that the forest at Paimpont was in a state of degradation and threatened by complete destruction.

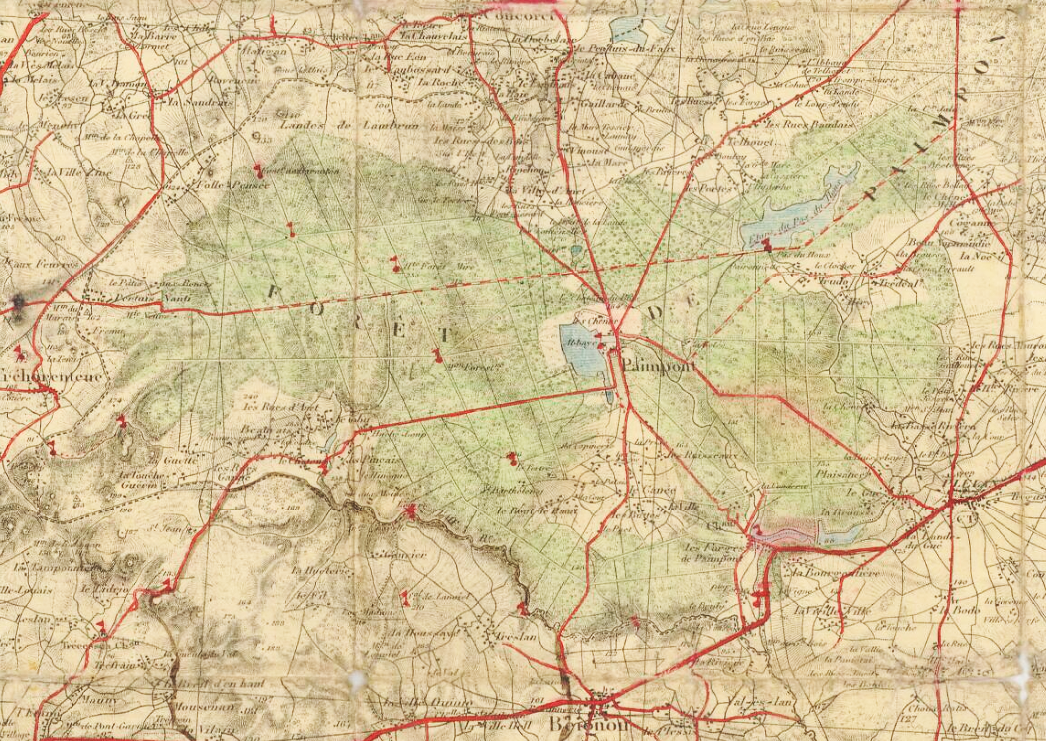
Historical map (1878)

In 1875, the forest was bought from Prince Philippe, Count of Paris by shipowner and industrialist Louis Levesque, for rest and pleasure. The new owner created the Domaine de Paimpont and organized hunts of wild boars and deer. Exploitation of the forest by the local population was limited to be only under licenses and the supervision of private forest rangers.

During World War I, the forest, deprived of most of its guards, was affected by major fires of unknown origin. During World War II, paratroopers of the SAS of Free France were dropped to join the partisans of the FFI in the forest with the mission of delaying German reinforcements as part of the Normandy landings in 1944. In the 1990s, a dam project on the Aff for the water supply of the Rennes region caused controversy and protests before being abandoned.

The forest has experienced many fires since the start of the 20th century. In September 1990, a large wildfire devastated 450 hectares of the forest of Paimpont, especially the area of the Val sans retour, raging for five days. Afterward, from 1991 to 1992, thousands of volunteers planted more than a half-million new trees. Other major fires have occurred in 1955, 1984, 2003, and in particular in 1976, when a fire ravaged a thousand hectares. Another massive blaze (preceded by a lesser one started by a man illegally burning garden waste two months earlier) occurred during three days in August 2022 as part of the 2022 European wildfires, which completely destroyed nearly 400 hectares of woodlands and moors and damaged some 230 more.

== Today ==
=== Forest management ===
The forest is an area of ZNIEFF and Natura 2000. It is mostly privately owned by landowners who maintain and exploit it for timber and for hunting; only a small part in the northeast (10%) is state-owned and managed by the National Forest Office. This situation prevents free movement in the forest, even on the outskirts of the village and its lake. However, landowners have signed an agreement authorizing hiking, although some forest paths are closed during the hunting season. Forest guards watch for behaviors that threaten the forest and its flora and fauna.

=== Tourism and legends ===
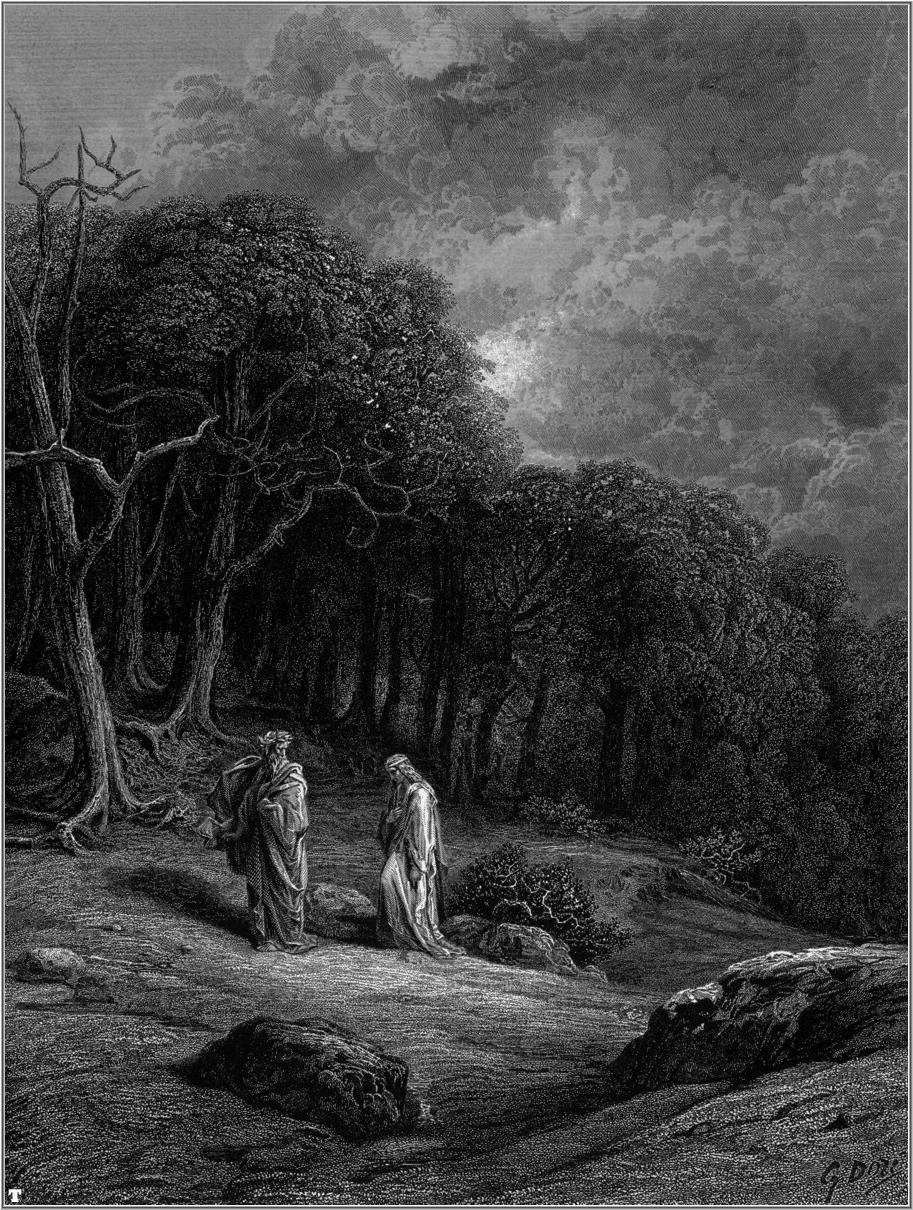
Merlin and Viviane enter Brocéliande in Gustave Doré's illustration for Idylls of the King (1868)

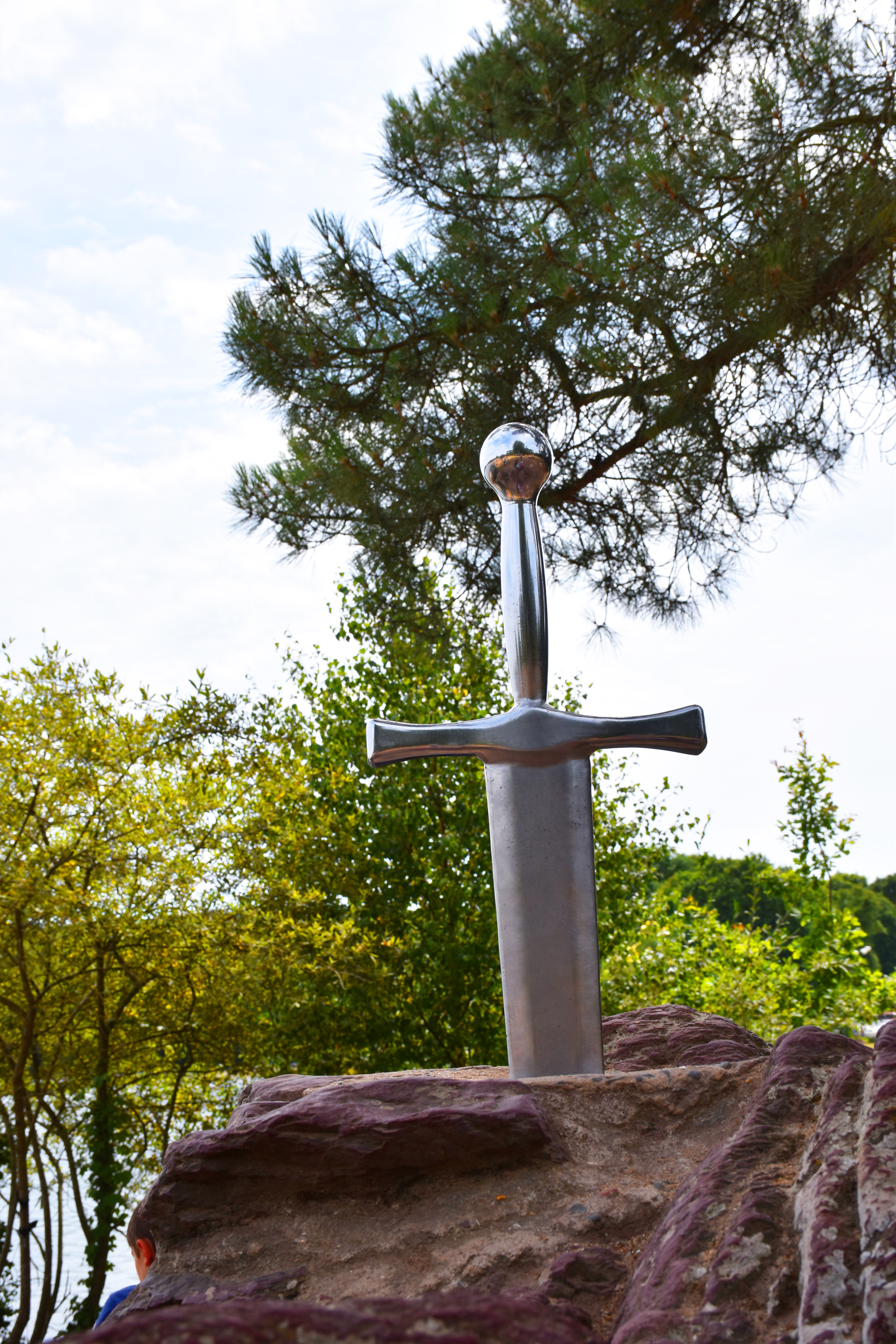
Excalibur statue at the shore of lake Trémelin in 2019

The Paimpont forest benefits from its association, since the 13th century, with the legendary forest of Brocéliande, which has become the site of many stories of Arthurian legend in the French romance tradition. The identification with Brocéliande became institutionalized with the creation of the communauté de communes de Brocéliande, which was itself regrouped within a supra-intercommunal structure named the Pays de Brocéliande.

The area has been a tourist destination site since the 19th century, especially after 1945. Since 1951, followers of Neo-Druidism also meet there periodically, including in organized ceremonies. The Paimpont sites are implemented through signs and pedestrian trails designed to introduce visitors to Arthurian locations, with explanatory panels linking each place to a legendary tale.

== Locations and legends ==
=== Building sites ===
==== Abbey of Notre-Dame ====
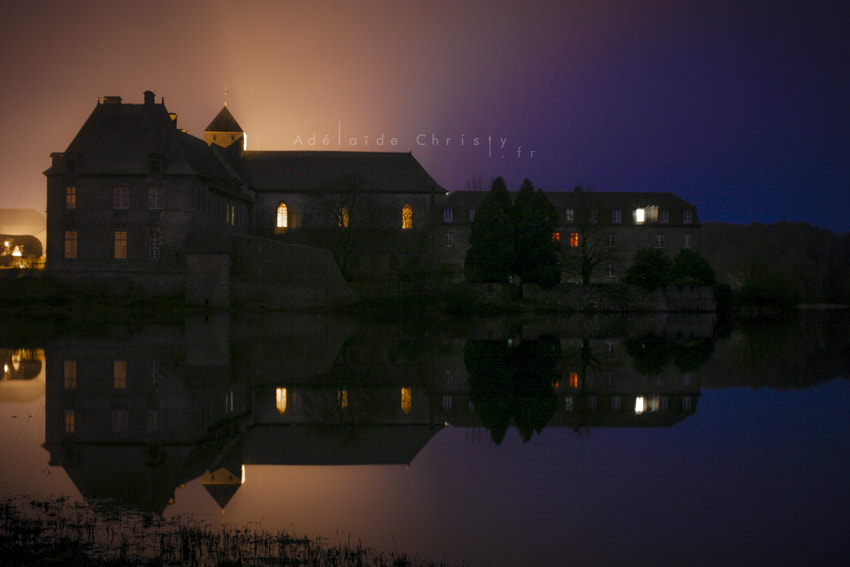
Abbey Notre-Dame de Paimpont in 2014

The Abbey Notre-Dame de Paimpont is a tourist and cultural location at the edge of Lake Paimpont. It is built in medieval Gothic style (walls, openings, baptistery and the Blessed Sacrament chapel, vault) with an interior (pulpit, statues, altars, altarpieces) in the Baroque style of the 17th century.

The abbey was built in the 13th century on the site of a priory founded in 645 by Judicaël, king of Domnonée. It was originally a Benedictine monastery but was inhabited by canons from the 13th century until the Revolution, when the abbey was nationalized and sold as biens nationaux in 1790.

==== Forges of Paimpont ====
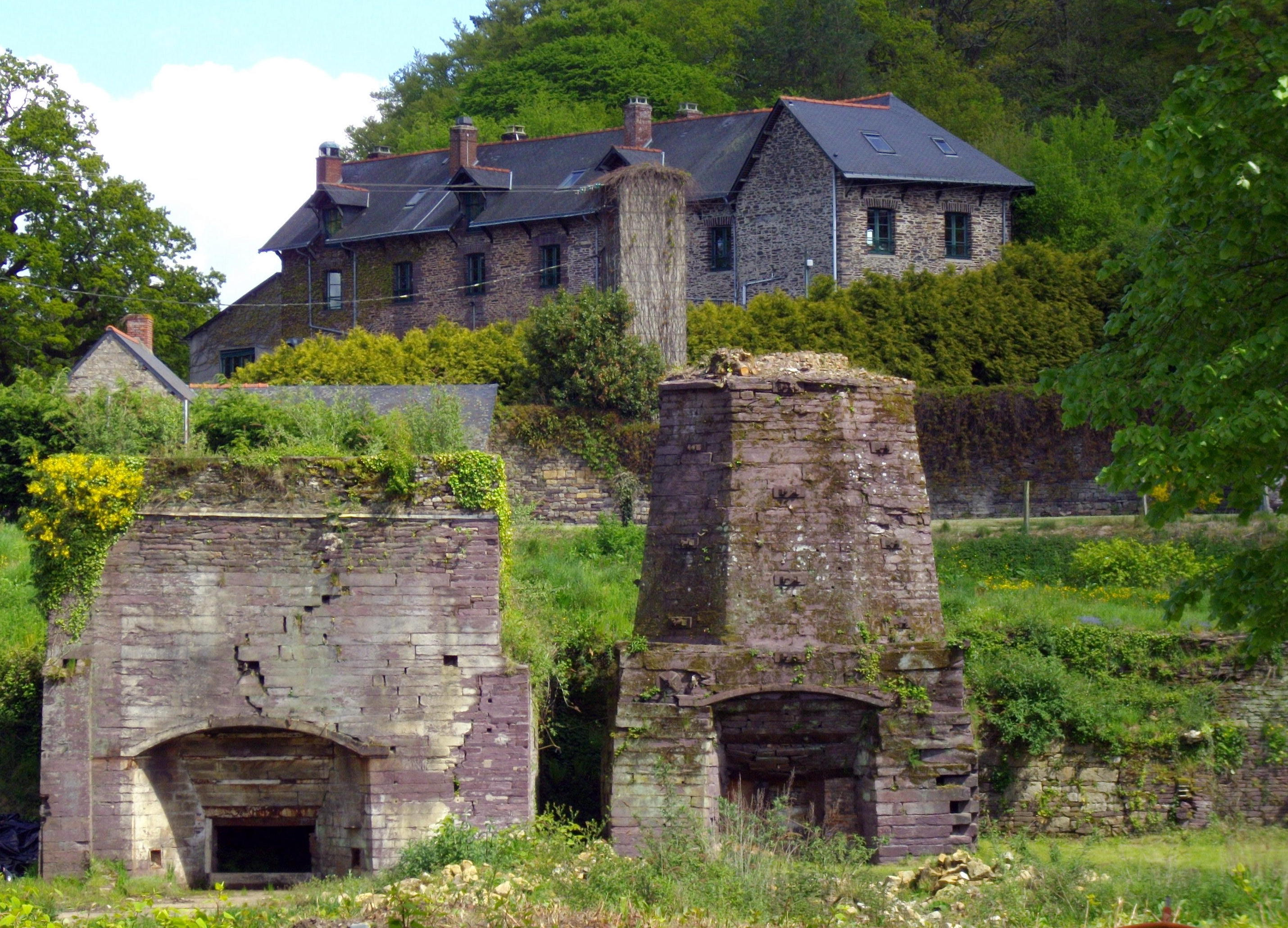
Forges de Paimpont in 2008

This historical industrial site has been listed as a historic monument since 2001, and was restored before it was opened to the public. Located in Ille-et-Vilaine, it is actually closer to Plélan-le-Grand than to Paimpont.

==== Château de Comper ====
The Château de Comper is a former castle and mansion located in northern part of the forest, two kilometers east of the village of Concoret. From the 13th century, Comper has been one of the strongest positions of Upper Brittany. The castle has been the scene of much fighting—including being badly damaged by fire in out-of-control riots in the forest during the Revolution in 1790—and has passed into the hands of several families. The mansion at the site now houses the exhibitions of the Centre de l'Imaginaire Arthurien (Center of the Arthurian Imagination). Adjoining it is a pond where, according to a local legend, the Lady of the Lake Viviane lived in her underwater crystal palace.

==== Château de Trécesson ====
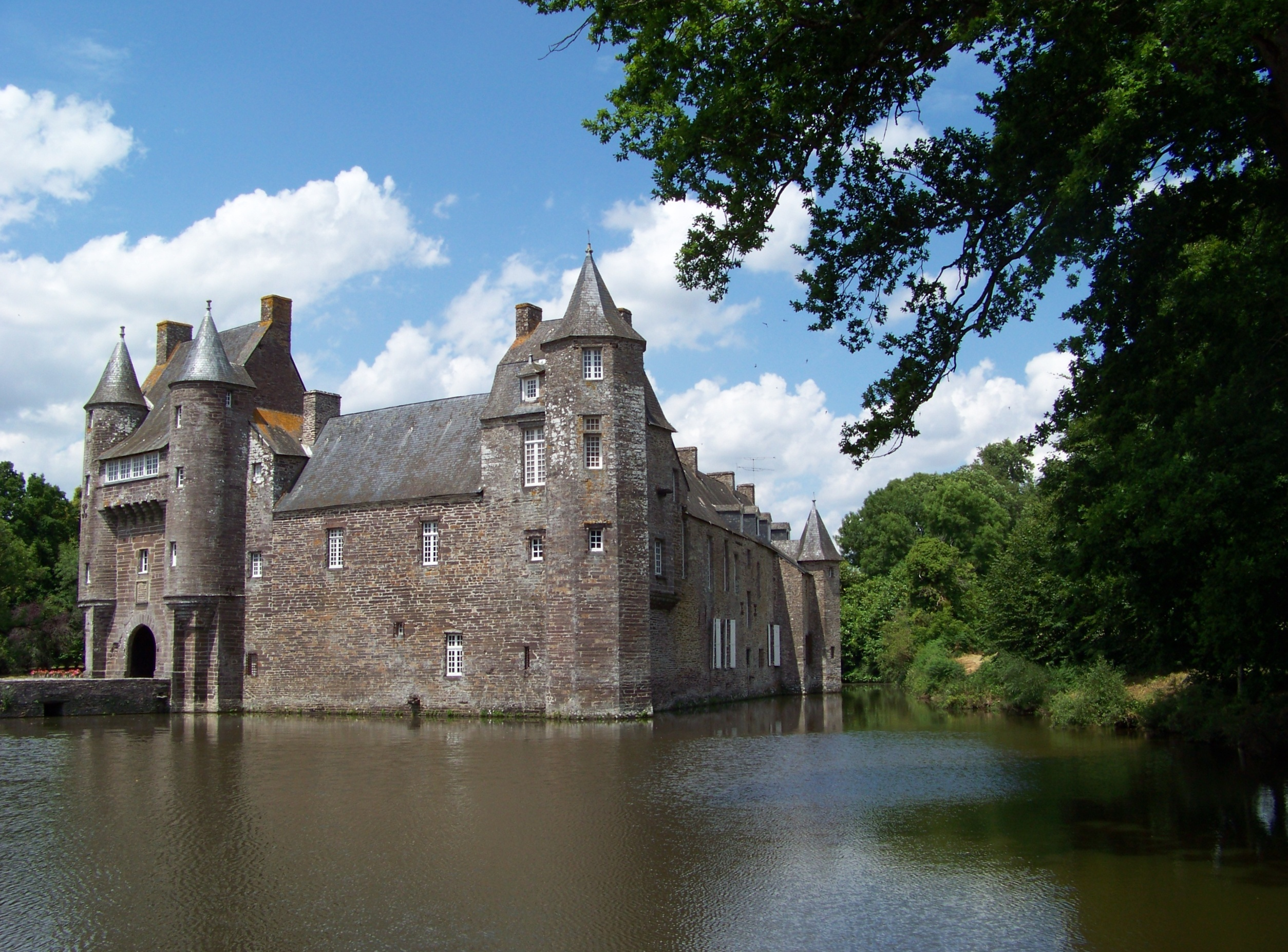
Château de Trécesson in 2007

Located outside the village and the forest, immediately in its extension to the southwest, this castle was rebuilt in its current state in the 15th century. The most famous of the legends associated with it is that of the Mariée de Trécesson (of "white lady" type), which, unusual for the region, has no Arthurian connections but instead seems to be inspired by a true story.

==== Biological station ====
The biological station of Paimpont, under the University of Rennes, was built in 1966–1967; its buildings accommodate about 70 people. The forest and its varied environments provide a framework for university biology courses as well as student and foreign researchers. Although the first researchers extensively studied moor ecology, soils, and hydrology, other works concern subjects far removed from the local biotope, such as the behavior of primates.

=== Megalithic sites ===
==== Hotié de Viviane ====
The Hotié de Viviane, also called the Maison de Viviane (lit. 'House of Viviane') or the Tombeau des Druides (lit. 'Tomb of the Druids'), it is a funeral circle of stones dating from about 4,500 ago. It is located near the Val sans retour and has been known under this name since 1843.

==== Tombeau de Merlin ====
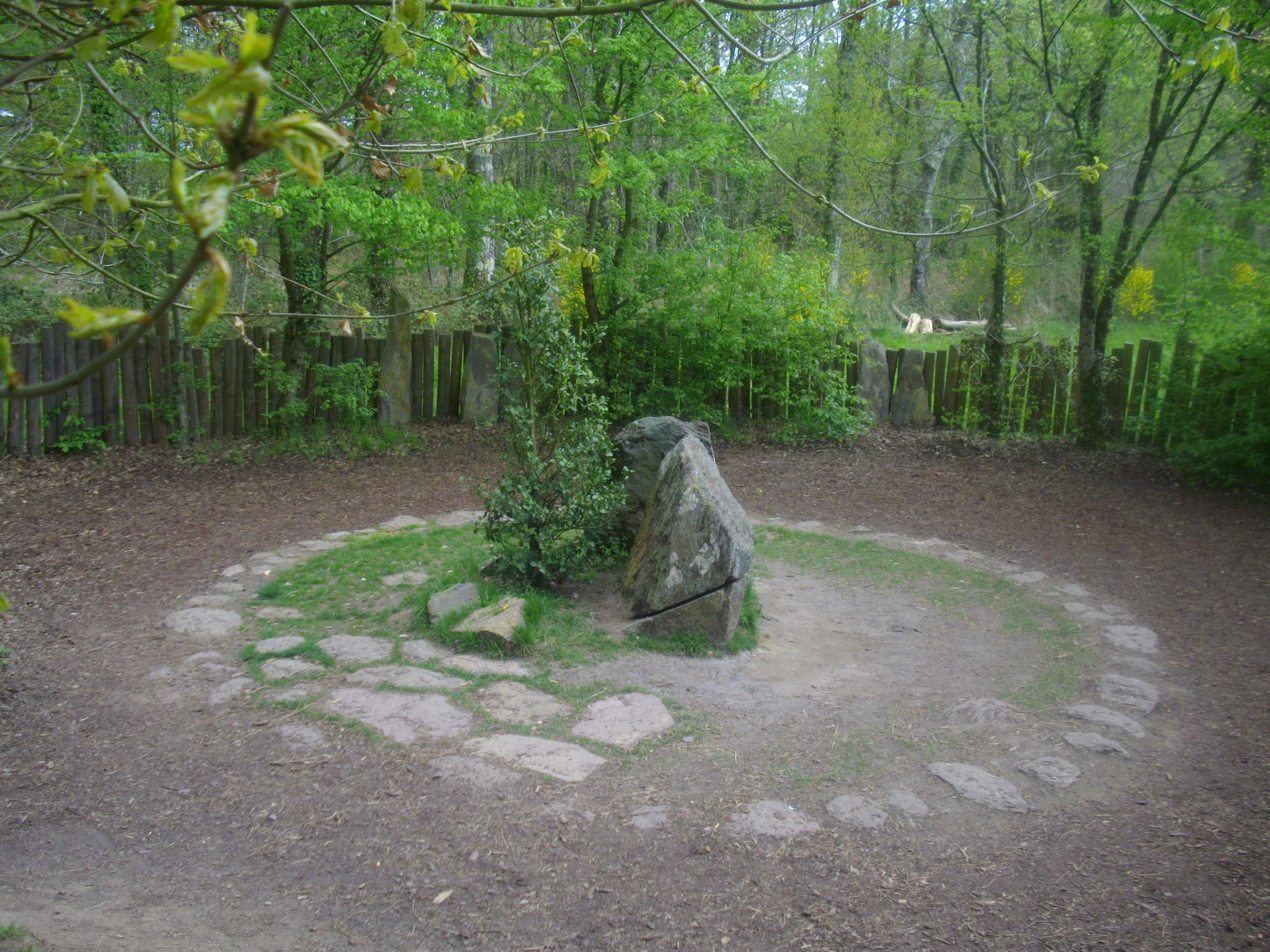
The Tomb of Merlin in 2009

In the northern part of the forest is the "Tomb of Merlin", a remnant of a Neolithic covered dolmen structure. The site was largely destroyed with dynamite by treasure hunters after it became associated with the Arthurian figure of Merlin in 1889.

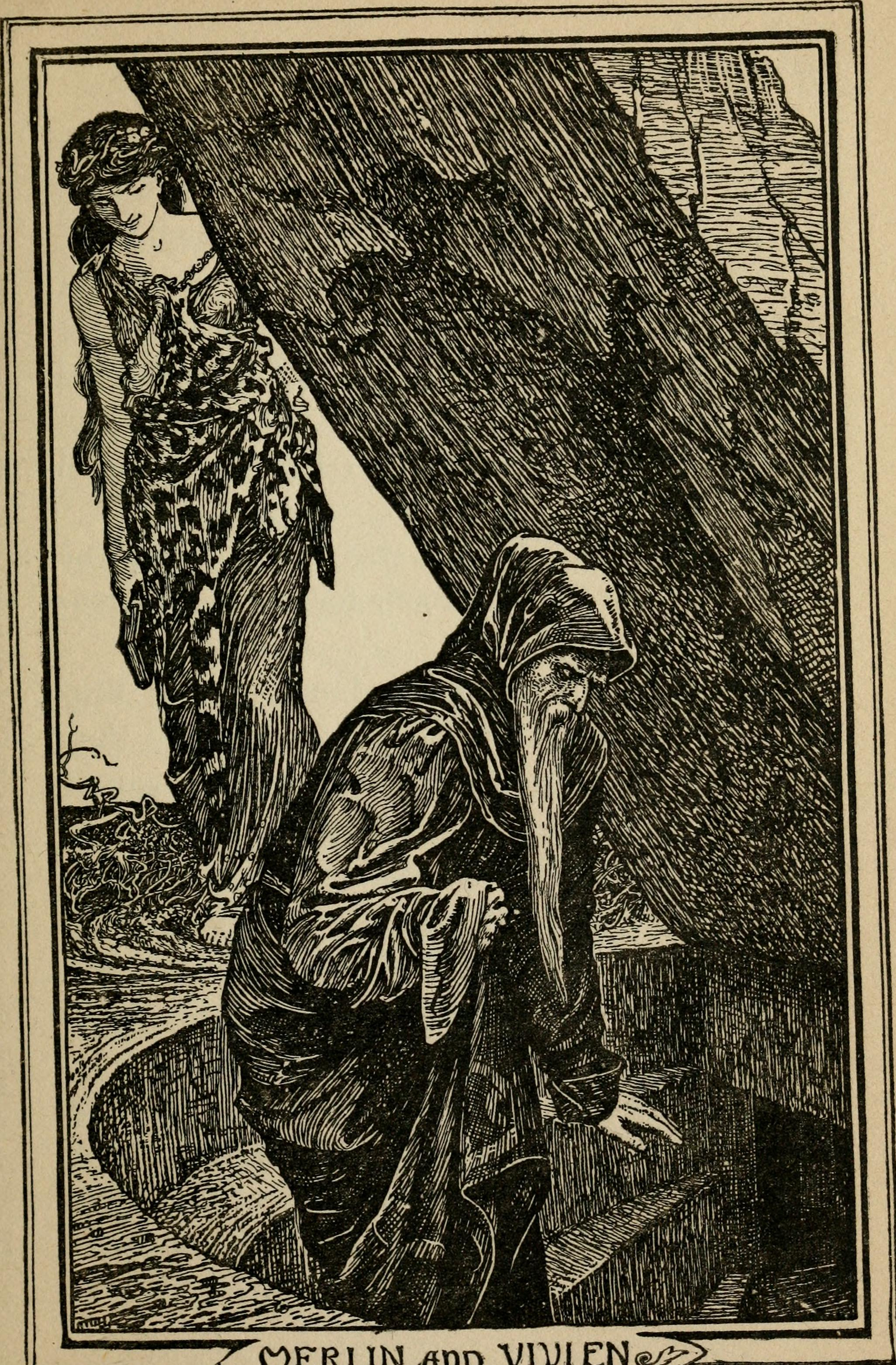
Merlin and Vivien, an illustration for Tales of the Round Table by Andrew Lang

According to the legend, having seduced Merlin, Viviane imprisoned him in an invisible prison, and then locked him in a tomb: Merlin, having lain down in a pit, had two enormous stones cast down on him. Today, it is an important site of Neopagan pilgrimages. Visitors to the site might leave flowers and a note to Merlin, often with a wish, or some kind of devotional object.

The Fontaine dite de Jouvence (lit. 'Fountain of Youth') is a water hole near the Tomb of Merlin. Also nearby there is an old tree known as the chêne des Hindrés.

==== Tombeau du Géant ====
This tumulus consists of four Neolitihic menhirs originally erected some 5,000–4,500 years ago, each over four meters long and one meter wide. Three menhirs were reused in the Bronze Age around 2,000–1,500 BC as a funerary vault; the fourth is on the ground about ten meters away. Formerly covered with a mound of earth, the site is by its impressive dimensions nicknamed "Tomb of a Giant". According to local tradition, it is the tomb of a giant defeated by the Knights of the Round Table. The Tombeau du Géant was reported as completely destroyed by the 2022 fire, but was in fact saved by firefighters, along with the first few rows of trees surrounding it.

==== Jardin aux Moines ====
The "Garden of Monks", located in Néant-sur-Yvel, also called Jardin aux tombes (lit. 'Garden of Tombs'), is a megalithic tumulus dating from 5,000 to 4,500 years ago. It is one of the many such mounds present in this region.

=== Natural sites ===
==== Val sans retour ====
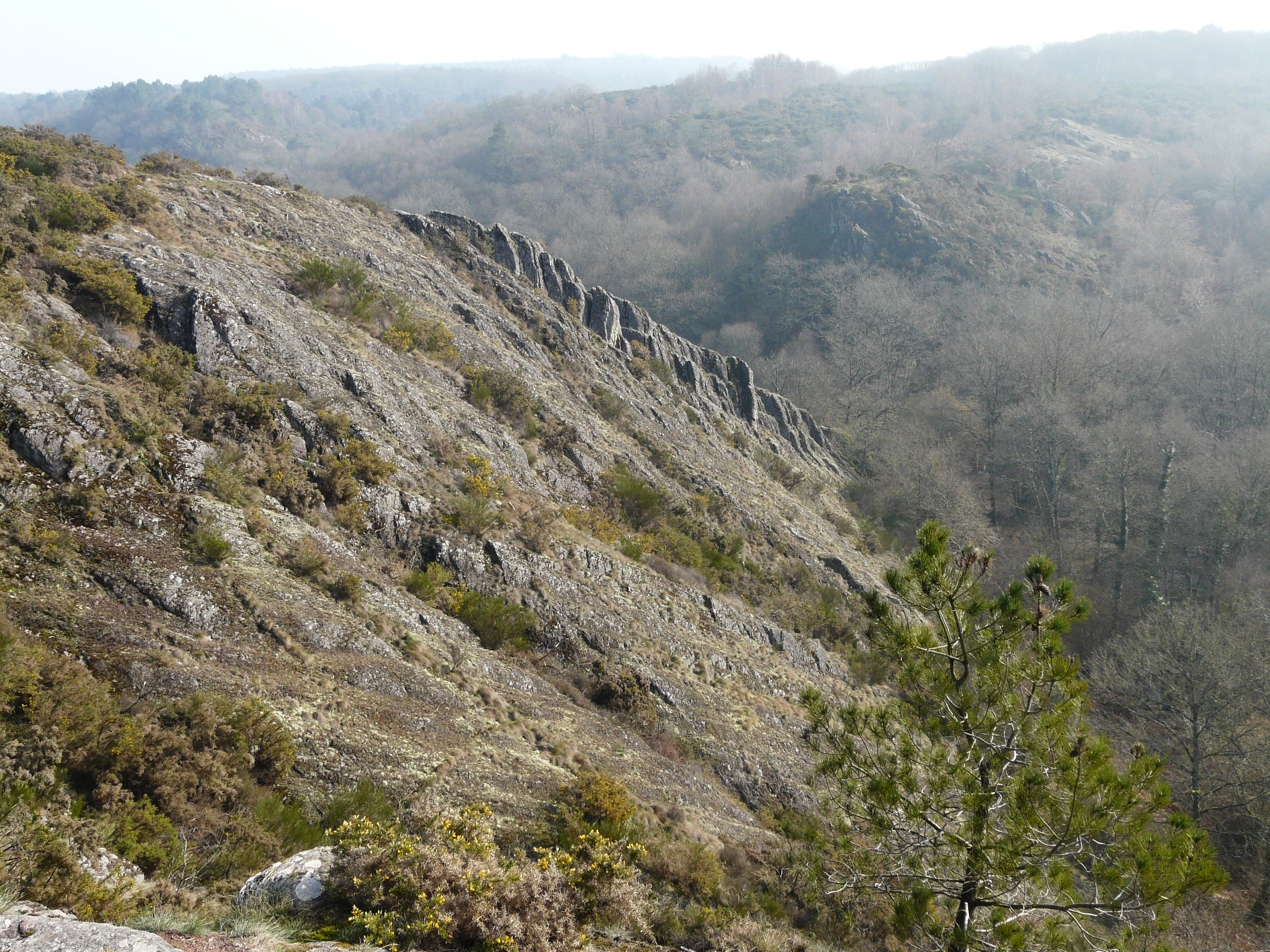
An overlook of the Val in 2017

The Val sans retour (lit. 'Vale of No Return'), is the most famous tourist place of the forest, located near Tréhorenteuc, west of Paimpont. It is a steep valley dug deep in red shale, the color resulting from the oxidation of the iron ore it contains. During the 19th century, there were two competing locations of the Vale in the forest, the other having been in the vallée de la Marette near the Tomb of Merlin and also including the initial location of the Tomb of Viviane. In 1896, Félix Bellamy decided that the Val sans retour was the place that inspired the anonymous 13th-century author to write the episode of the Vale in Lancelot-Grail.

According to the French tradition of Arthurian legend, Queen Morgan le Fay, half-sister of King Arthur, betrayed by her lover, decided to keep all the unfaithful knights as prisoners in a vale of that name. Only Lancelot, faithful to Queen Guinevere, was able to break the spell, escape, and free the captive knights.

High above the Vale, the rocher des Faux-Amants (lit. 'Rock of False Lovers') is the spot where Morgan le Fay is said to have turned her lover who betrayed her into stone. Another location is the Siège de Merlin (lit. 'Seat of Merlin'), a rock overlooking the valley.

A lake that since the 1940s has been known as the Miroir aux Fées (lit. 'Fairy Mirror') marks the entrance to the Vale. Nearby stands the Eglise du Graal (lit. 'Church of the Holy Grail'), a Catholic church featuring imagery of Morgan and other Arthurian characters associated with the Vale reimagined as Christian-themed scenes, painted by two German prisoner-of-war artists after WWII, as commissioned by eccentric local priest Father Henri Gillard.

==== Remarkable trees ====
The forest of Paimpont contains several special trees. One of them is the hêtre de Ponthus (the beech of Ponthus), associated with the tale of Ponthus and Sidonia.

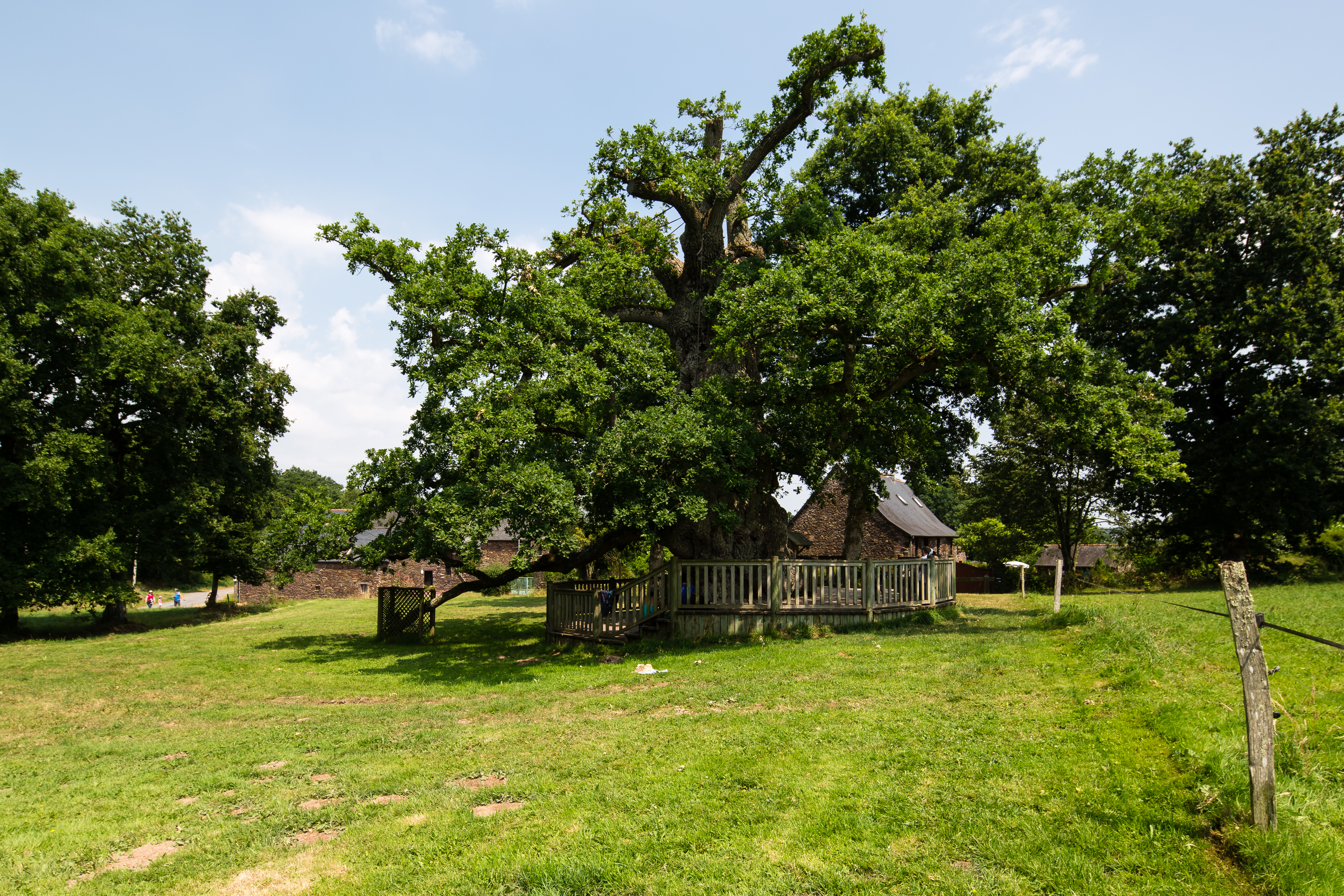
The chêne à Guillotin in 2013

The most famous is an old oak about 1,000 years old and more than 9 meters in circumference: the chêne à Guillotin (the oak of Guillotin), located between Concoret and Tréhorenteuc. According to a local legend, a refractory priest named Pierre-Paul Guillotin took refuge there during the French Revolution, continued to administer sacraments and blessings in the region, and wrote a valuable journal of revolutionary events.

==== Fontaine de Barenton ====
The Fountain of Barenton (also known as Berenton, Belenton, or Balenton) is located west of the forest, near the hamlet of Folle-Pensée, and is quite difficult to access. As quoted in medieval literature, and retained to this day, this fountain occasionally has rosaries of bubbles rise to its surface. The site first become associated with the legendary fountain of Brocéliande by Auguste Brizeux in 1836. A local custom made young men and women visit the fountain in search of marriage.

It is here that Ywain, as described by Chrétien de Troyes in Yvain, the Knight of the Lion, challenged the Black Knight, guardian of the fountain. According to a later legend, this is also where Merlin met Viviane, and the water of this fountain had the power to cure mental illnesses.

== References in popular culture ==
- In René Barjavel's 1984 Arthurian novel L'Enchanteur, the stone hill above the Val sans retour is actually Morgan's castle which, cursed by the Devil (Merlin's father), "has become a rock, from the top of which we have a bird's eye view of the wild valley. Tourists come, Japanese, Germans especially, some French too. They do not suspect that under their feet still rages the sister of King Arthur, imprisoned in a huge rock."
- The forest is the setting of the 2002 horror film Brocéliande.
- The forest is mentioned by name and depicted in an early scene of Ridley Scott's 2010 action-adventure film Robin Hood.

== See also ==
- List of forests in France
- Locations associated with Arthurian legend
