= Centre de l'Imaginaire Arthurien =

Arthurian-themed cultural centre

The Centre de l'Imaginaire Arthurien (English:The Centre for the Arthurian Imaginary, but often referred to as the Centre Arthurien, English:The Arthurian Centre) is a cultural centre dedicated to the Matter of Britain. It was founded in 1988 in Rennes through the influence of different specialists in Arthurian legend, local politicians, artists and writers. Since 1990 its headquarters has been at the Château de Comper, in Paimpont Forest.

It organises an annual exhibition with the theme of the Arthurian legends and a cultural season with many events, including the Pentecôte du Roi Arthur (Pentecost of King Arthur), Rencontres de l'imaginaire de Brocéliande (Encounters with the Imaginary of Brocéliande) and the Semaine du dragon (Dragon Week). The centre's investment in publicising the art, culture and history of the Arthurian legends and its support for open access to education has brought it public recognition. The members of the centre also founded the publishing house Artus, which publishes books on those themes.

Claudine Glot has been the president of the Centre de l'Imaginaire Arthurien since its foundation. Its membership includes numerous personalities like Philippe Guillou, Gilbert Durand and Michel le Bris. The elficologist Pierre Dubois, artists Séverine Pineaux, Bruno Brucéro and Didier Graffet and academics Philippe Walter and Bernard Sergent are also among the centre's mainstays. Nicolas Mezzalira has been the director since 2008. The centre receives an average 30,000 visitors per year, nearly a third of whom are scholars, but also among them have been celebrities such as Mario Vargas Llosa, Nolwenn Leroy and Patrick Poivre d'Arvor.

== Foundation and objectives ==
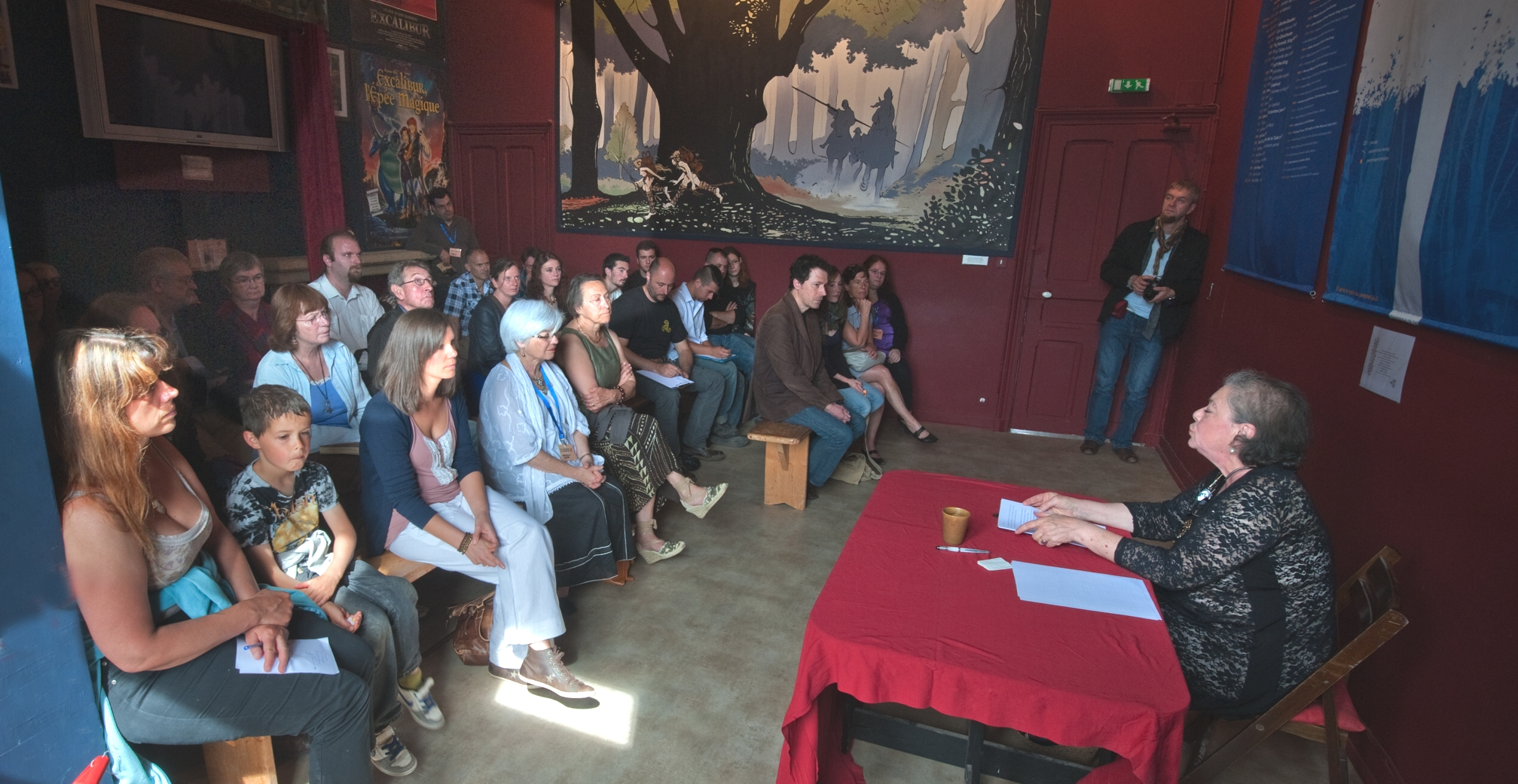
Claudine Glot in conference in the image Image Room at the château de Comper.

The foundation of the Centre de l'Imaginaire Arthurien met the needs of the people of the Ploërmel area and the visitors to the forest of Brocéliande (which has been identified with Paimpont Forest) who were looking for a source of information on the legendary King Arthur. It owes much to the contributors of the journal Artus, a publication devoted to the Celtic countries, including specialists such as Gilbert Durand.

The Centre de l'Imaginaire Arthurien has the objectives of reaching out to the general public on the Arthurian legends, disseminating artistic works (writing, visual arts, music, street arts, storytelling...), promoting the Matter of Britain to contemporary creatives so that they understand and perpetuate it, and enhancing the legendary cultural heritage. In an interview with France 3, Claudine Glot summarised the aims of the centre by saying that it has a vocation to attract enthusiasts of the Celtic, medieval and Arthurian worlds, and talk about all the works that they inspire, including Heroic Fantasy. It disseminates all that is artistically or historically related to the Arthurian legends and the Forest of Brocéliande and is seen as an organisation that "maintains the myth". Claudine Glot attaches great importance to the surrounding "forest of the soul" where "legend breathes.".

== History ==
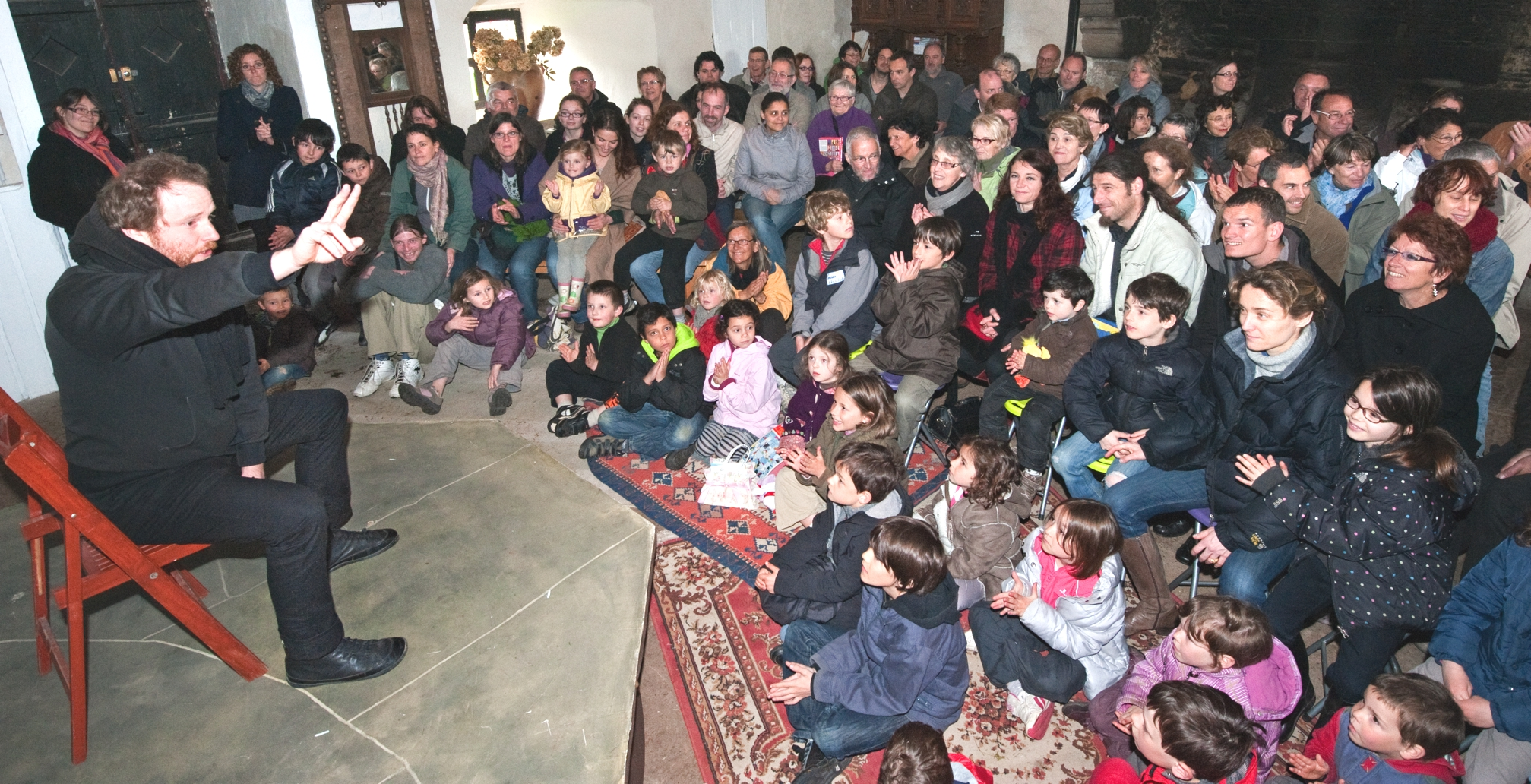
The storyteller François Lavallée performing at the Château de Comper in April 2012.

From its inception in 1988, the Centre de l'Imaginaire Arthurien has led in multiple areas. Its eclectic exhibitions include modern works as well as Pre-Raphaelite paintings. It organises (and hosts) spectacles, storytelling, concerts, conferences, guided tours in the forest and educational presentations for school groups. The centre participates in drafting catalogues, educational projects, journées du patrimoine (heritage days) and outreach in schools and universities, assists in documentary research, and compiles bibliographies and iconographies. There are many scholars from different countries among its members.

In addition, members of the centre publish books on these themes through their publishing house Artus: fine art books on Brocéliande, Brittany, Ireland and Scotland; essays (Le Gant de Verre, Les Guerriers de Finn by Michel Cazenave) and theatre with La Légende de Deirdre.

=== 1988–1990 ===
In 1988, the Centre de l'Imaginaire Arthurien was officially established in Rennes, thanks to the willing efforts of several academics, regional politicians and writers. Michel Le Bris was among the principal founders, with Claudine and Hervé Glot. The International Arthurian Society and academic writer Gilbert Durand were supporters of the project.

The first exhibitions were devoted to King Arthur (Arturus Rex, in collaboration with the Université Catholique de Louvain, 1988), Brocéliande and the Forest (1989), Megaliths and Stones(1990) with the participation of Pieter-Paul Koster. These were mounted at various locations in the region, including Ploërmel, Rennes and colleges. In 1990, the exhibition was installed in the Château de Comper and opened throughout the summer. At the same time new activities commenced, such as tours of the Paimpont Forest. Following the fire that raged over 500 hectares of Brocéliande from the 7 to 11 September 1990 the centre had to begin again and rehabilitated itself.

=== 1991–1996 ===
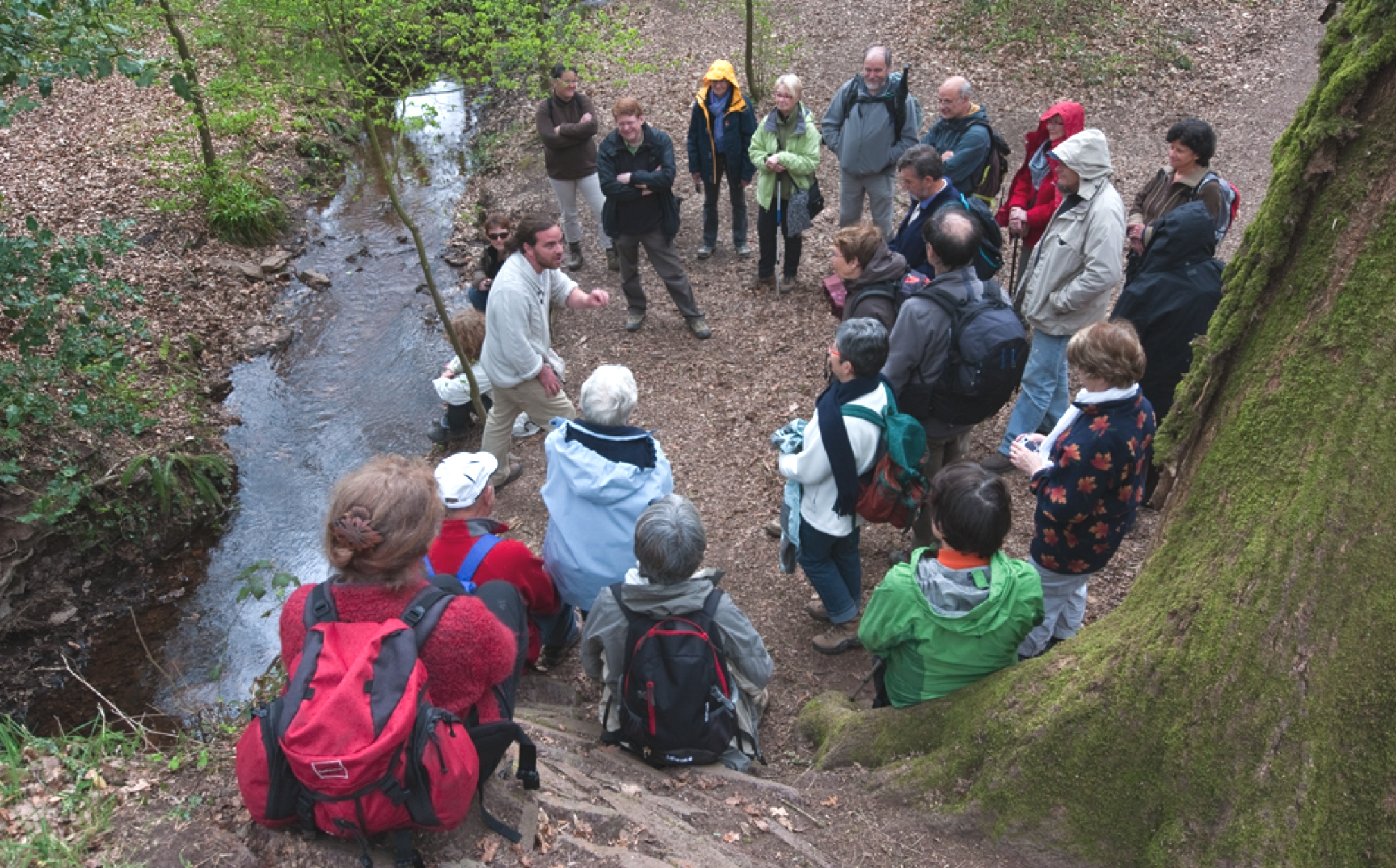
Nicolas Mezzalira, storytelling with a group during a visit to Forest of Brocéliande.

In 1991, the exhibition was devoted to cinema and especially the film Excalibur, and the director John Boorman was welcomed at Comper. France 3 Bretagne produced a documentary, then the centre was involved in planting the l'Arbre d'Or (golden tree) at the entrance to the Val sans retour. It was also in 1991 that the first spactacles were organized in the park at the Château de Comper.

In 1992, the exhibition focused on graphic novels, with the participation of François Bourgeon. In addition to spectacles, music and storytelling were hosted. The centre was invited to exhibit in Paris, and to participate in conferences between December 1992 and March 1993.

From 1993 to 1996, the centre collected and highlighted information about Merlin, monarchs and magicians, and the Knights of the Round Table. School groups were invited, Michel Le Bris, Michel Cazenave, Christian Guyonvarc'h or Philippe Le Guillou held conferences. It organised the exhibits at the Festival des mythes et légendes (Festival of Myths and Legends) at the Château d'Amboise (2 to 5 March 1994), and exhibited in the area to the south-east of Rennes for a period of six months. In 1995, the municipal library at Rennes organised the literary event, Un Automne Arthurien (An Arthurian Autumn). In April 1996, the book Hauts-lieux de Brocéliande (Significant places in Brocéliande) - born from the work of Centre members - was published by éditions Ouest-France.

=== 1996–2005 ===
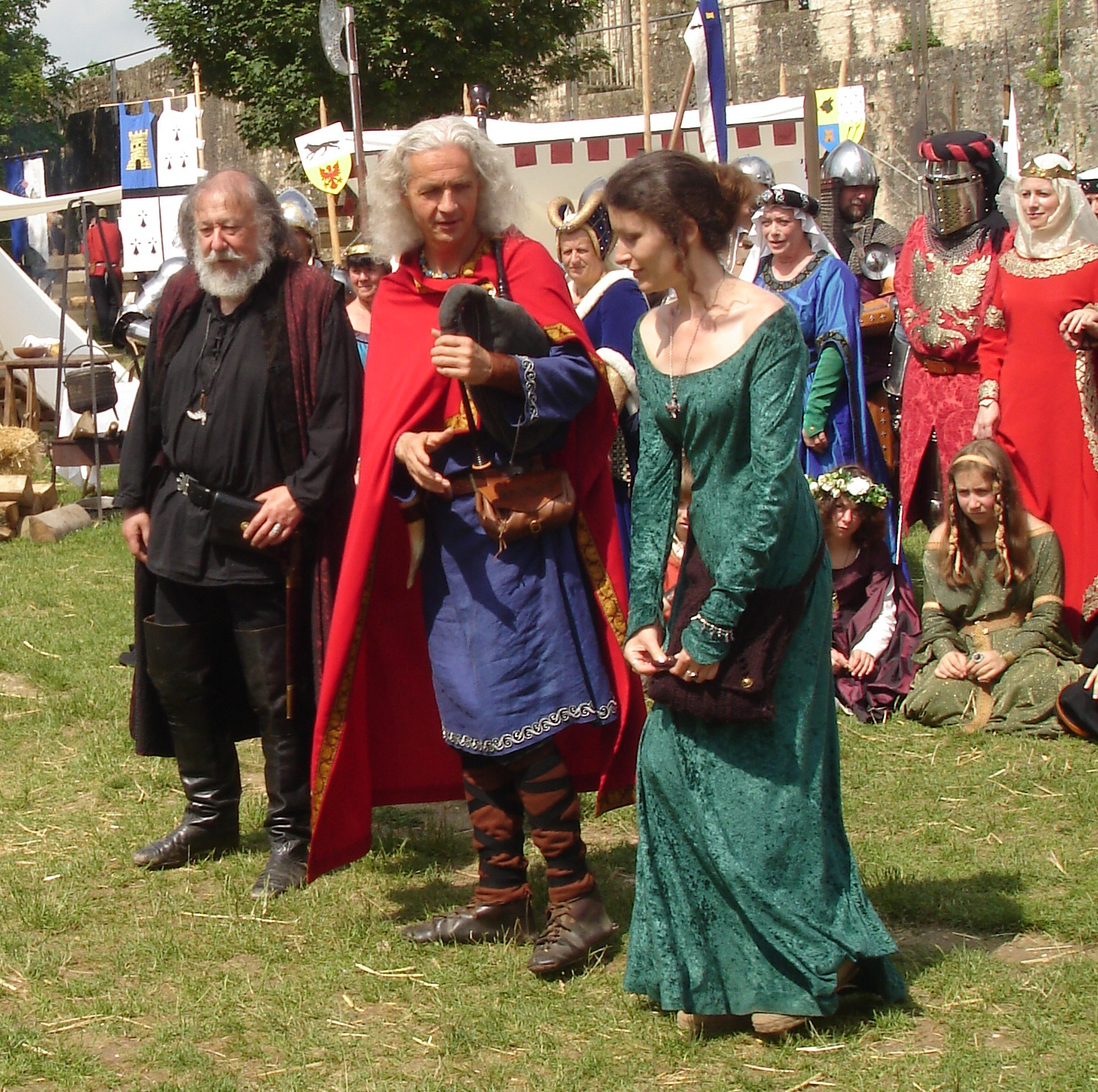
The members of the Centre de l'Imaginaire Arthurien, guests of honour at the 27th médiévales de Provins en 2010.

On 8 and 9 March 2001, the symposium Le monde et l'autre monde (The World and the Other World) was held in Rennes with the participation of members of the Centre de l'Imaginaire Arthurien. The 2005 exhibition Les Enchantements de Bretagne (The Enchantments of Brittany), described the adventures experienced by the characters the Arthurian legends. The year 2005 also saw the establishment of a live action role-playing game and a treasure hunt.

=== 2006–2007 ===
In 2006, the exhibition presented the relations between faeries and knights in the medieval romance and in more recent works. Celtic and medieval faeries, the warriors of Ireland and the Knights of the Round Table were featured, including Lancelot and Viviane. Sets, costumes and accessories were created by artists and artisans.

In 2007, the annual exhibition was devoted to the Knights of the Round Table. The season was marked by the Knight's Pentecost, a temporary exhibition Naissance de la féerie (Birth of Faerie) with texts by Pierre Dubois and photographs by Hervé Glot, stories, music (harp), three lectures by Claudine Glot, a medieval kermesse and a show devoted to the Forest. The guest of honour at the Rencontres de l'Imaginaire was Olivier Ledroit. The last event of the season was the European Heritage Days.

=== 2008–2010 ===
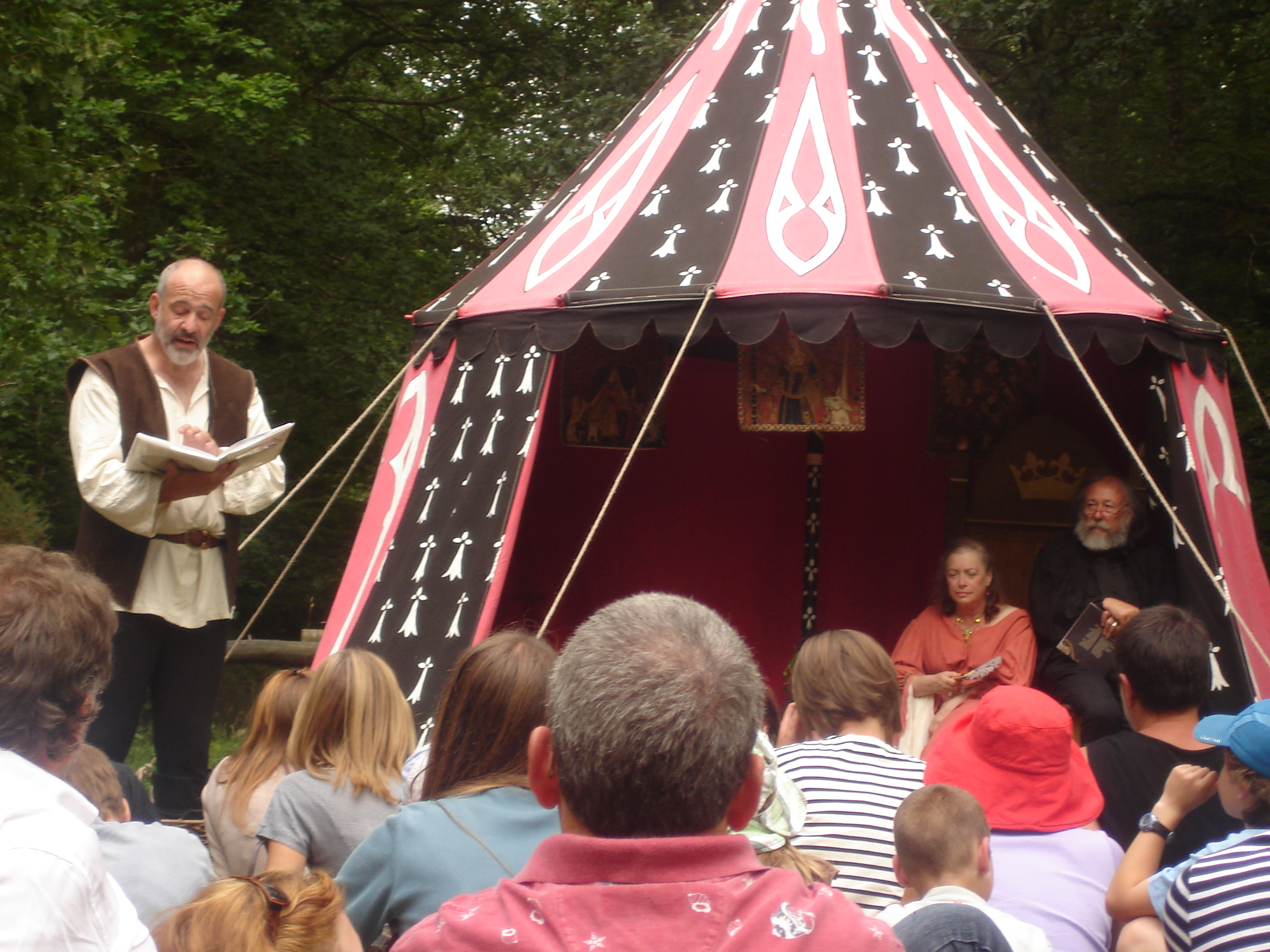
A story session at Comper in July 2010 (right Claudine Glot and Pierre Dubois)

In 2008, the chosen theme of the exhibition was entitled Des Celtes au roi Arthur (From the Celts to King Arthur). It demonstrated the Celtic heritage of medieval romances and legends from the Irish epics. During the months of May and June, a photo exhibition devoted to Scotland was mounted. The guests of honour at Rencontres de l'Imaginaire were Barbara Canepa and Alessandro Barbucci. The theme of the 2009 exhibition, Dans la forêt de Merlin (In Merlin's Forest), focused on the different facets of the enchanter and his forest. To celebrate the publication of the graphic novel Merlin by Soleil Celtic the guests of honour at Rencontres de l'Imaginaire in that year were Aleksi Briclot and Jean-Sébastien Rossbach.

In 2010, the centre's exhibition was devoted to Arthurian legends and magic. An exhibition and a book dedicated to the Lai of Lanval were created through collaboration with artists from Devon in England. It included works by Breton and English artists such as Terri Windling. A partnership with Chagford Filmmaking Group based in Exeter brought the realisation of the film Sir Lanval. The centre was also invited to be the guest of honour at the 27th Médiévales de Provins.

=== 2011–2012 ===
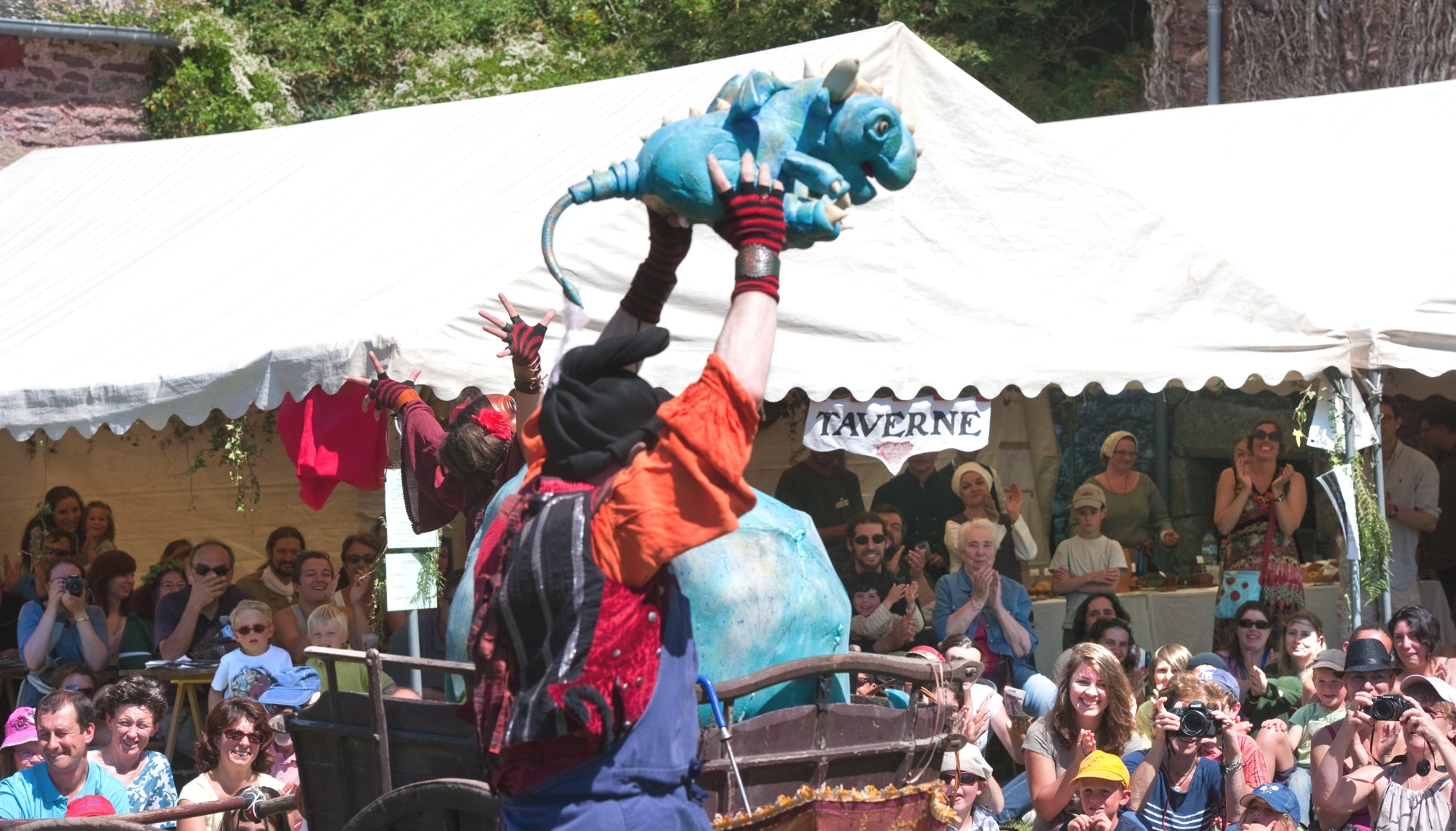
The Compagnie du Lysandore during Rencontres de l'Imaginaire in Brocéliande, 2012.

In 2011, the exhibition focused on two faeries: Morgana and Melusine. Pierre Dubois and René Hausman were the guests of honor at the 2011 Rencontres de l'Imaginaire. At the end of June, the singer Nolwenn Leroy came with a team from France 2 to shoot a documentary about the Arthurian legends and the Forest of Brocéliande with the help of the centre. According to the director Nicolas Mezzalira, in November 2011 the association that manages the centre comprised about 300 members. It launched a campaign to restore and open La Petite Maison des Légendes (The Little House of Legends) in Concoret on 14 December.

In addition to the usual days of storytelling, musical events and lectures, 2012 was punctuated by signings with Séverine Pineaux and Jerome Lereculey. During the Printemps des Légendes en 2012 (Spring of Legends organised at Monthermé the centre was guest of honour, making camp and mounting an exhibition. According to the French newspaper L'Union, this festival in the Ardennes was a great success. The guests of honour at the Rencontres de l'Imaginaire 2012 were Arleston and Guillaume Sorel.

At the end of November 2012, La Petite Maison des Légendes officially opened, thanks to a grant by the Fondation du Patrimoine (Heritage Foundation) in Brittany, to private donations and to subsidies from the Communauté de Communes de Mauron en Brocéliande, the Conseil Général du Morbihan and from the region. The first event was organised with the Congolese storyteller Jorus Mabiala, and the second marked the publication of the Chats, le livre secret (Cats, the Secret Book)by Séverine Pineaux.

Costume performances during events at the centre in 2012

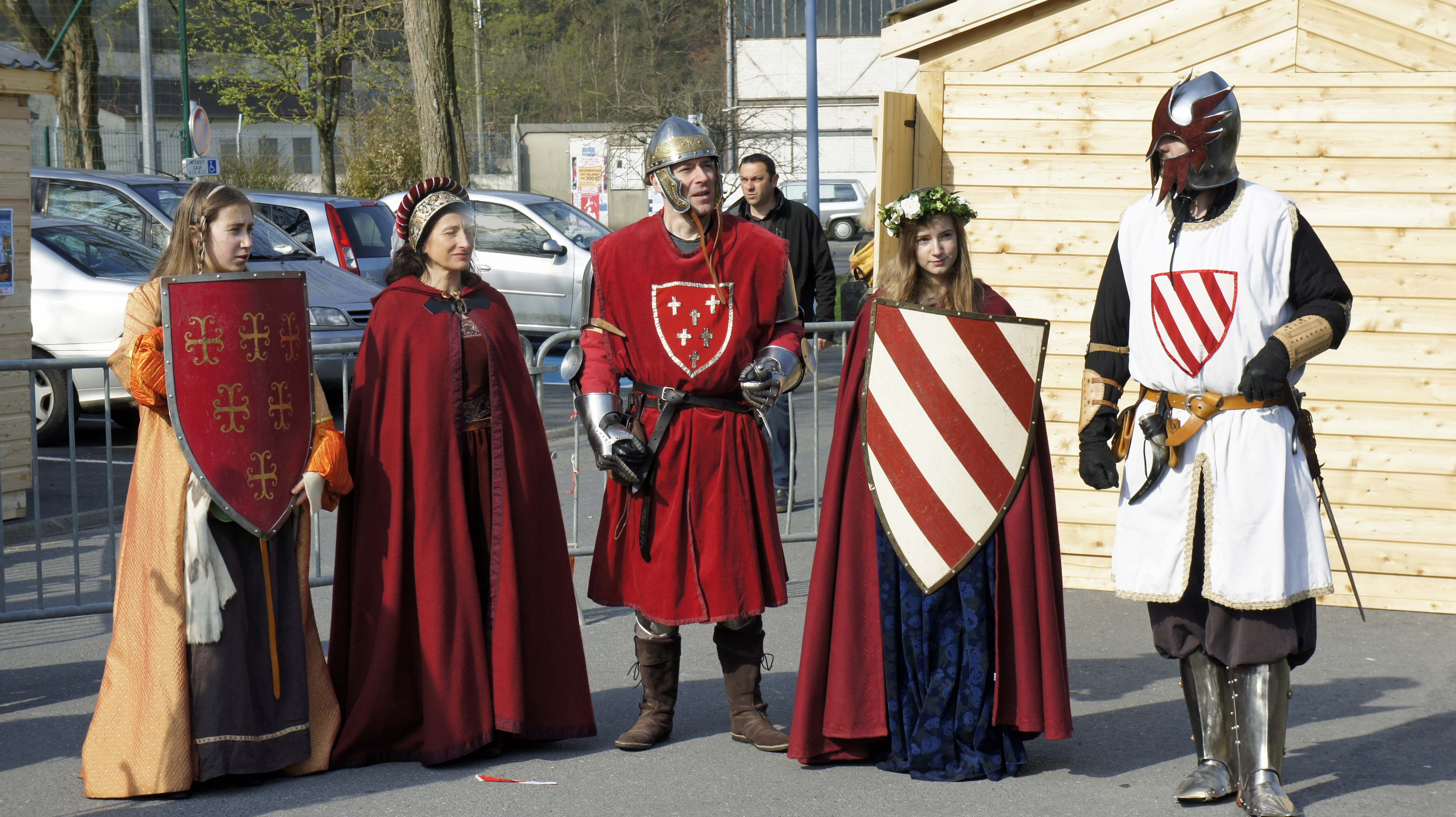
Lancelot and Perceval

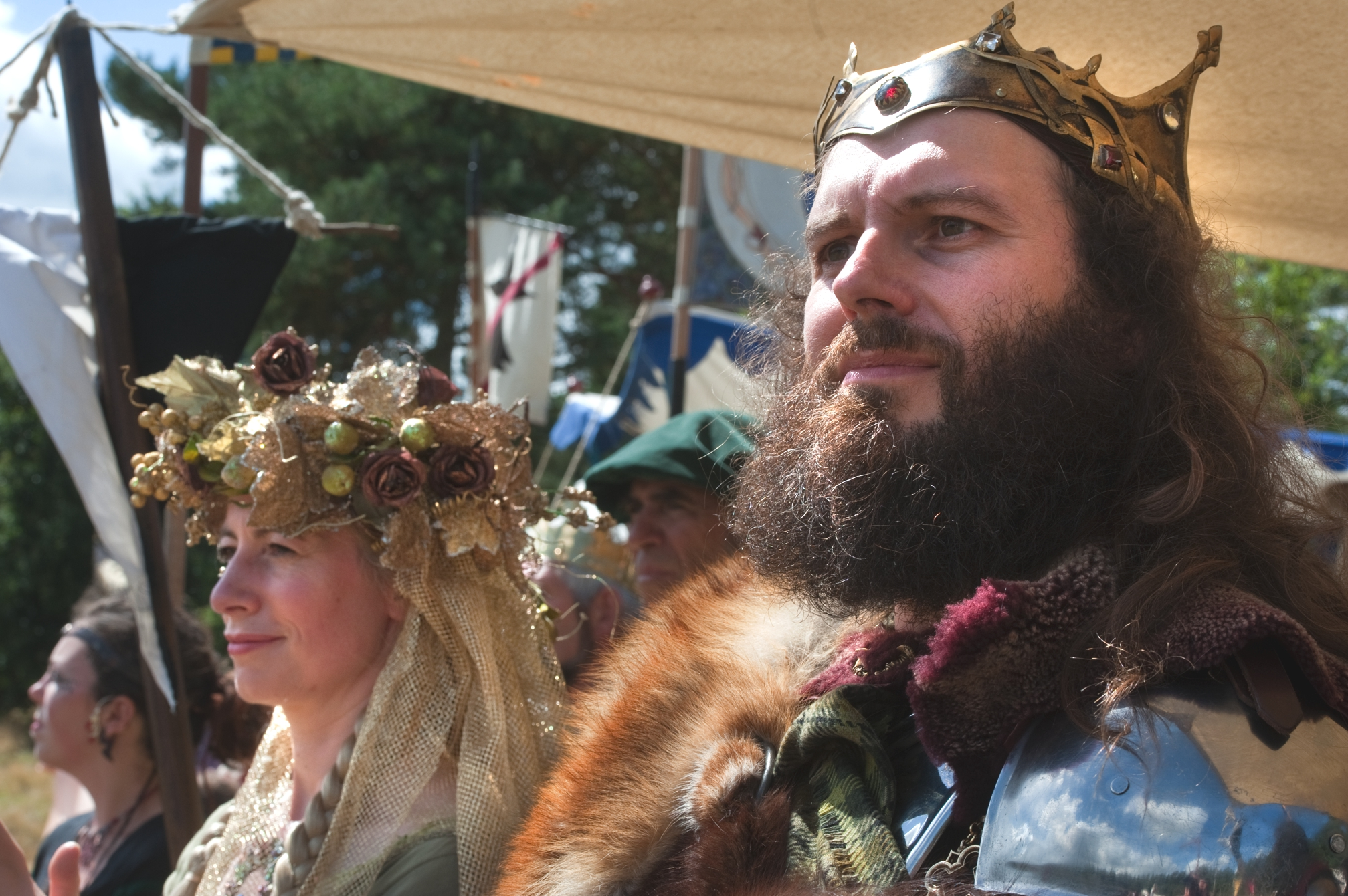
Arthur et Guinevere

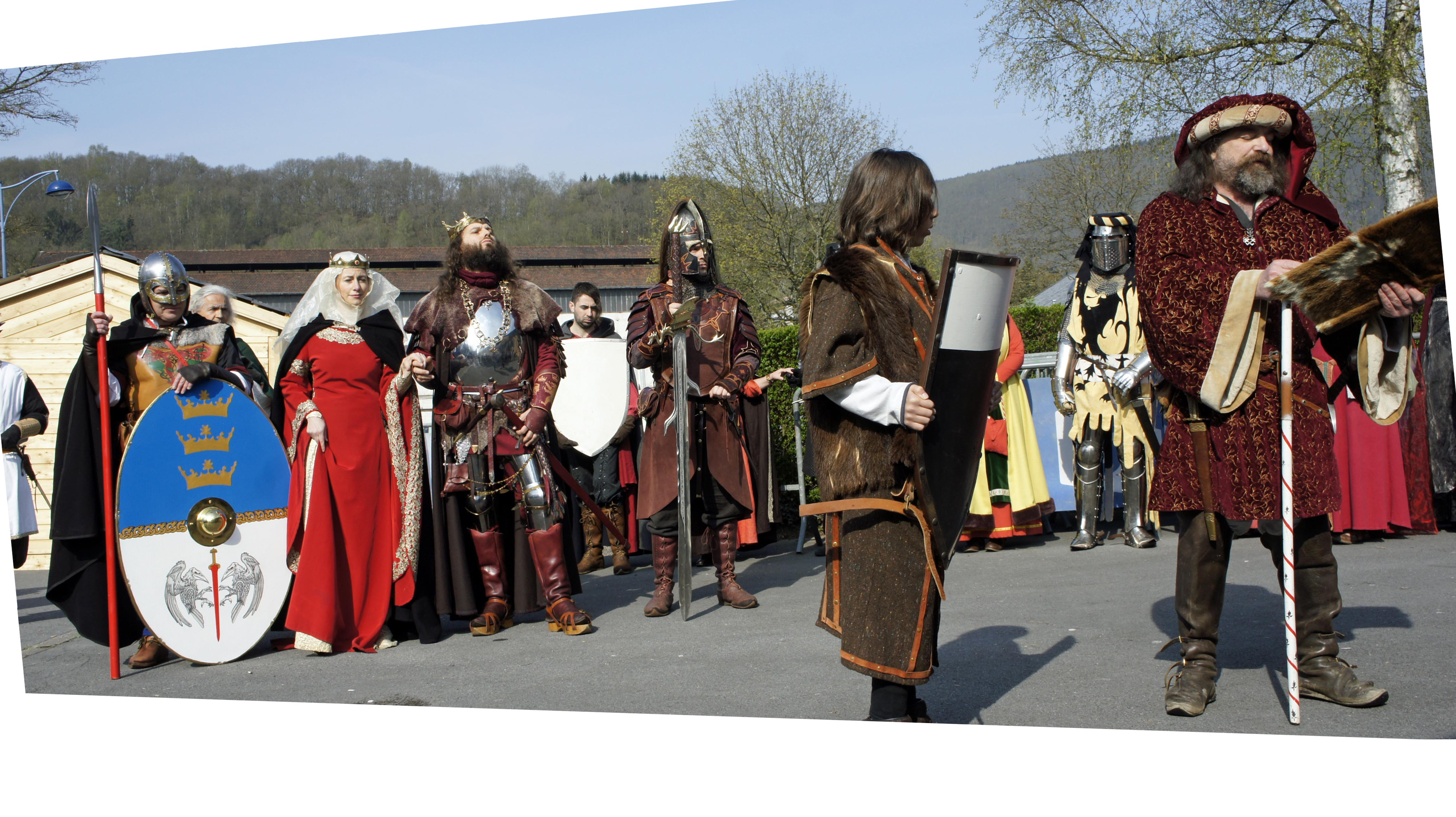
Seneschal Kay

=== Annual exhibition themes ===
- 1988 : Arturus Rex Le roi Arthur
- 1989 : Brocéliande et l'obscur des forêts
- 1990 : Mégalithes et pierres
- 1991 : Excalibur (de John Boorman)
- 1992 : Les Compagnons du crépuscule (de François Bourgeon)
- 1993 : Souveraines et Magiciennes
- 1994 : Merlin
- 1995 : Chevaliers ! (Les Chevaliers de la Table Ronde)
- 1996 : Les Guerriers d'Or
- 1997 : Tristan et Iseut
- 1998 : Le roi Arthur
- 1999 : Charmes et Chevalerie
- 2000 : Légendes de Brocéliande
- 2001 : La quête du Graal
- 2002 : Merlin
- 2004 : Légendes Celtiques
- 2005 : Les enchantements de Bretagne
- 2006 : La fée et le chevalier
- 2007 : Les Chevaliers de la Table Ronde
- 2008 : Des Celtes au roi Arthur
- 2009 : Dans la forêt de Merlin
- 2010 : Légendes et féerie
- 2011 : De Morgane à Mélusine
- 2012 : Femmes-fées

== Organisation ==
Claudine and Hervé Glot (respectively President and Secretary), Gilbert Durand (Research Fellow, Honorary President) and Michel Le Bris (Writer, Honorary President) were among the founders of Centre de l'Imaginaire Arthurien. Except for Gilbert Durand, who died in late 2012, all remain in office. The elficologistPierre Dubois joined them a few years later and became Chancellor. Artists such as Carmelo de la Pinta and Sophie Busson, as well as researchers (Christian Guyonvarc'h and the archaeologist Jacques Briard who has undertaken excavations in Paimpont Forest) promote or have actively supported the centre. The composition of the officers has changed over time.

The following information is from the l'ours (bears) of the Centre de l'Imaginaire Arthurien, published on the official website

- President: Claudine Glot
- Co-president: Philippe Le Guillou
- Honorary Presidents: Gilbert Durand, Michel Le Bris, Guy and Jean Aubert Kersabiec
- Chancellor: Pierre Dubois
- Secretary: Hervé Glot
- Treasurer: Roselyne Saulier
- Scientific Committee: Denis Hüe, Philippe Walter and Bernard Sergent
- Director: Nicolas Mezzalira
- Team: Dominique Robertière, Christophe Germier and Aurore Charles.

== Important locations ==
The Centre de l'Imaginaire Arthurien is open to the public at the château de Comper from the beginning of March to the end of November. Since the end of 2012 Ls Petite Maison des Légendes is open to the public during the winter months when the Château is closed. Both are situated in the Commune of Concoret (Morbihan, Brittany).

Since 2009, the centre has taken part in event outside Brittany every year (Médiévales de Provins, Printemps des Légendes...).

=== Château de Comper ===
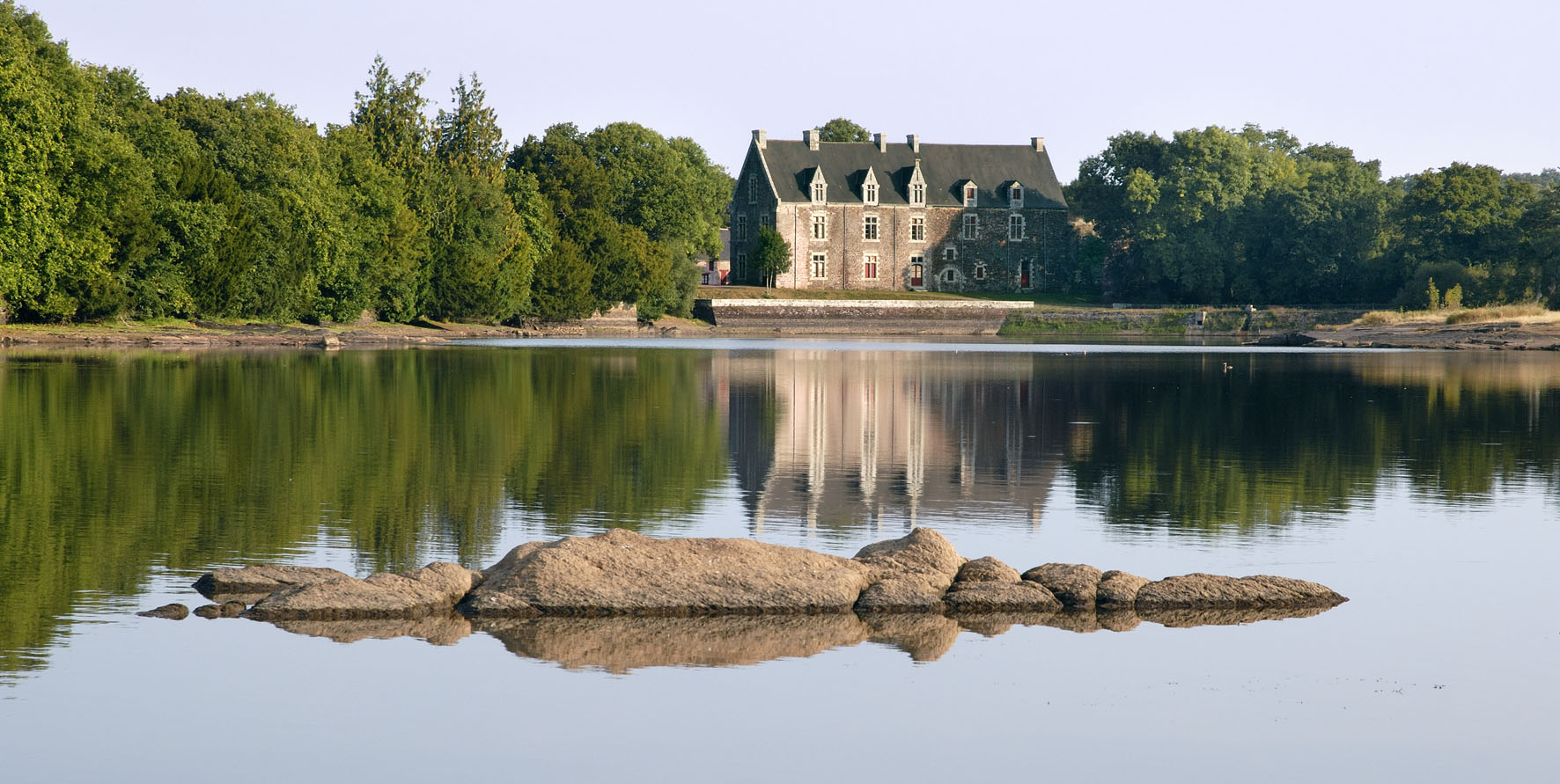
The château de Comper, at Concoret, on the shores of the Faery Vivian's lake

C’est le lieu le plus magique que l'on puisse avoir. Comper a réellement « fait » le centre arthurien. Le château est au croisement de la légende et de l’Histoire. It's the most magical place that we could have. Comper has really made the Arthurian Centre. The Château is at the crossroads of legend and history.

— Claudine Glot, Interview accordée à Wikimedia France

The Centre de l'Imaginaire Arthurien has lodged at the Château since 1990. It is open to the public from the beginning of March until the end of October. The centre rents the entire west wing of the main building. The ground floor is equipped with a bookshop offering hundreds of volumes (books, graphic novels, fine art books etc.) on the legends, the Celts and the Middle Ages, as well the permanent and temporary exhibitions on the theme of the Authurian legends. The projection room, on the first room, enables visiters to watch documentaries (films, reportage, etc.).

The Château is the starting point for guided visits to the forest. Different events (storytelling, lectures, craft fairs, book signings etc.) are organised there on specific dates: the Pentecôte du Roi Arthur, the Rencontres de l'imaginaire de Brocéliande and the Semaine du Dragon, among others. The Château is itself associated with a legend of the faery Viviane which is often told to interested visiters.

=== Petite Maison des Légendes ===
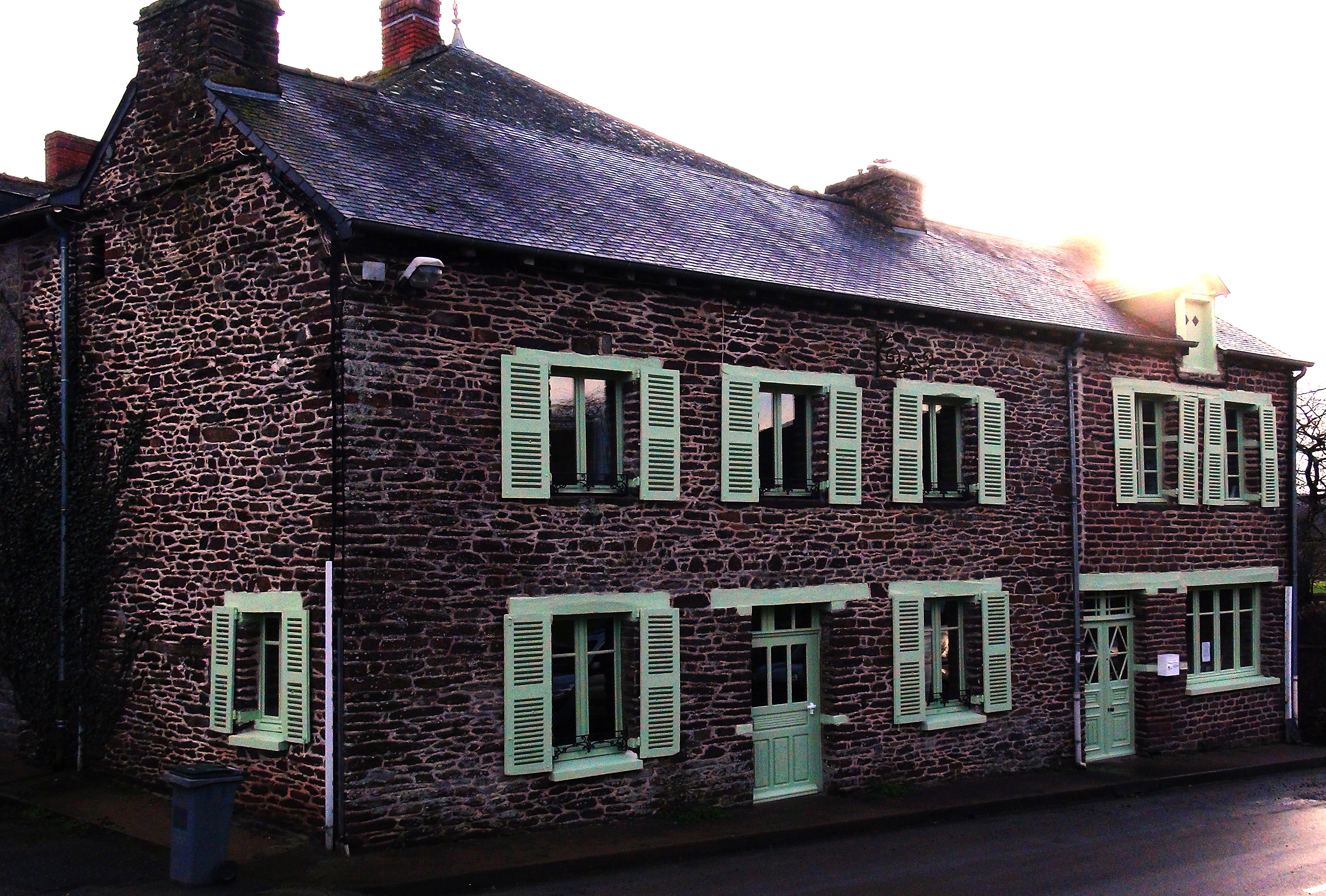
La Petite Maison des Légendes at Concoret in 2013.

La Petite Maison des Légendes opened at the end of November 2012. It includes a permanent bookshop and hosts events organised by the Centre de l'Imaginaire Arthurien (exhibitions, displays, briefings) when the Château de Comper is closed in the winter months. La Petite Maison also accommodates the artist-in-residence.

Built in the red schist typical of the region, the building is owned by the centre's treasurer, who has made it available to the centre for fifteen years. It has been restored thanks to a grant from the Fondation du Patrimoine and public and private donations. Notably, this enabled the repair of the external woodwork.

== Events organised by the Arthurian Centre ==
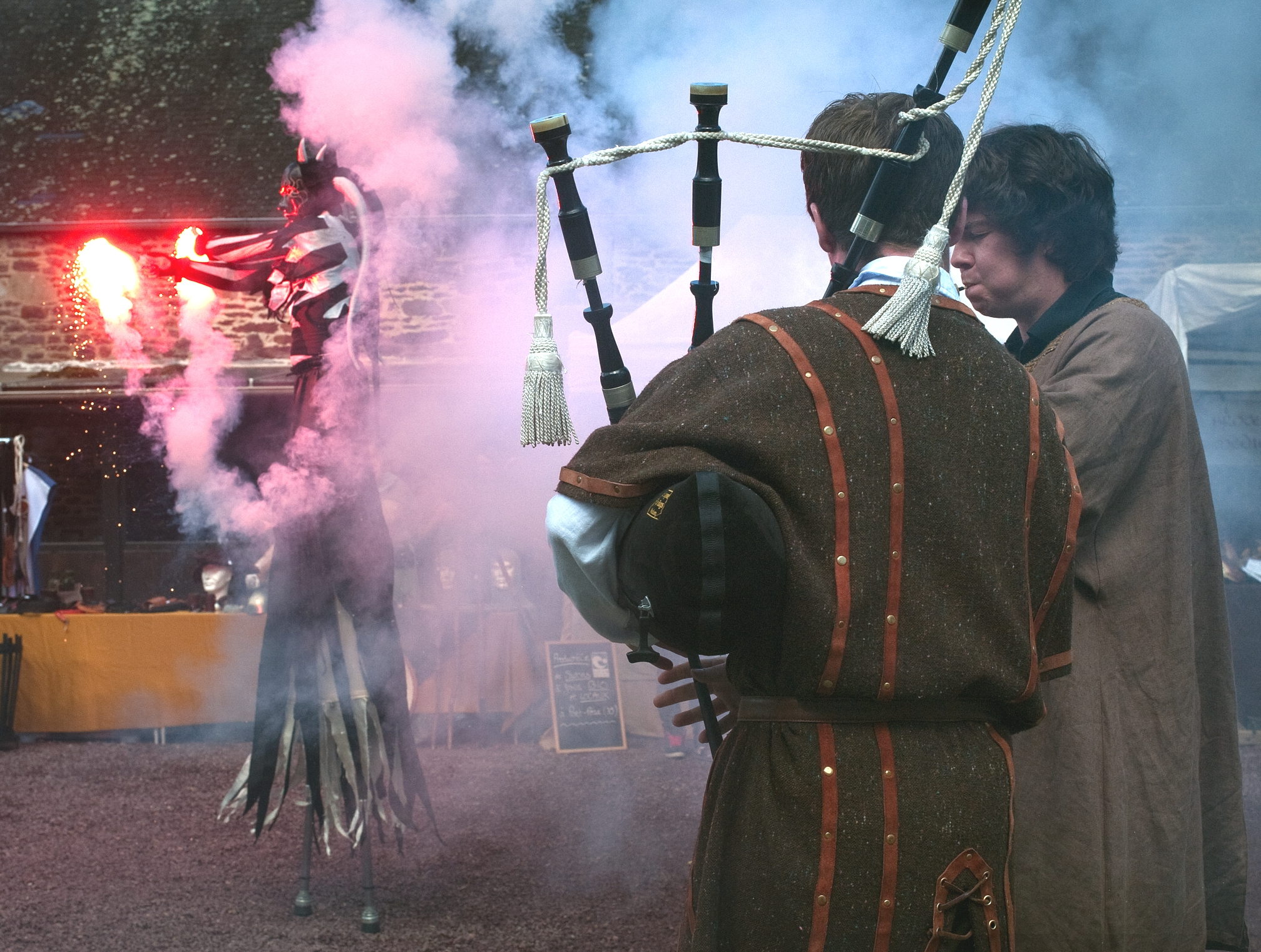
Stilt walkers and musicians in the courtyard of the Château de Comper during the medieval market in August 2012.

Each year, the Arthurian Centre's opening season is marked by events, some of which have now been held for more than ten years. The three principal event are the Pentecôte du Roi Arthur, the Rencontres de l'imaginaire de Brocéliande and the Semaine Du dragon. The Château de Comper also hosts conjurers and illusionists during the Samedis de la Magie (Magic Saturdays). The medieval market in August is an occasion to welcome craftspeople and organise a Kermesse.

=== Pentecôte du Roi Arthur ===
The Pentecôte du Roi Arthur is a medieval spectacle with jonglerie, storytellers, camps, storytelling, camps and other displays such as historical reenactment and living history. As the name suggests, it coincides with the date of Pentecost. It is a celebration of spring and the adventures and encounters which it brings, but most importantly (according to Ouest-France) it is an evocation of King Arthur's coronation day (as described by Robert de Boron in the 13th century) and his commitment to the Church. It was also on Pentecost that the Holy Grail appeared to the Knights of the Round Table.

=== Rencontres de l'Imaginaire de Brocéliande ===
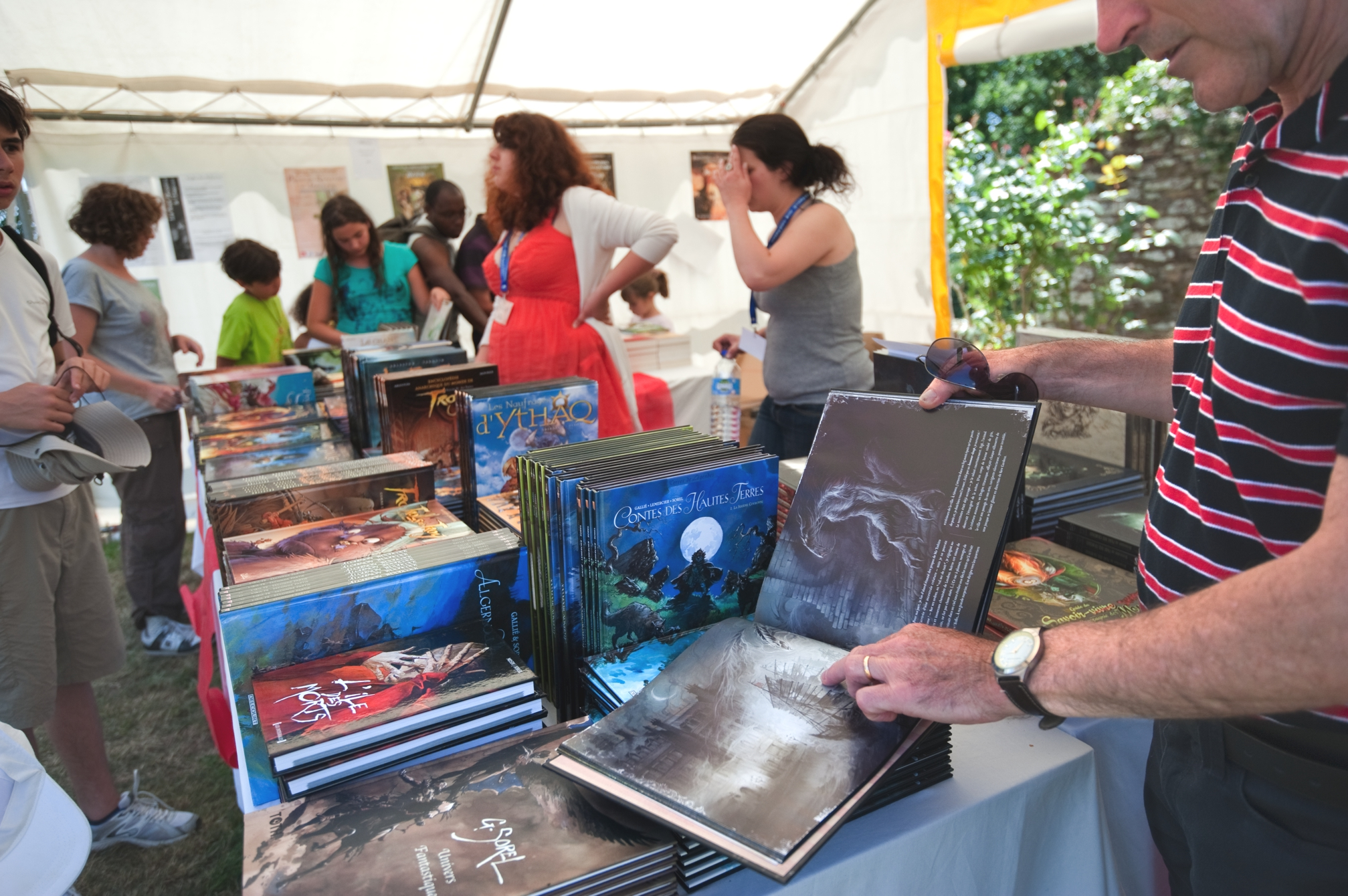
A bookshop under canvas at the Rencontres de l'Imaginaire de Brocéliande in 2012.

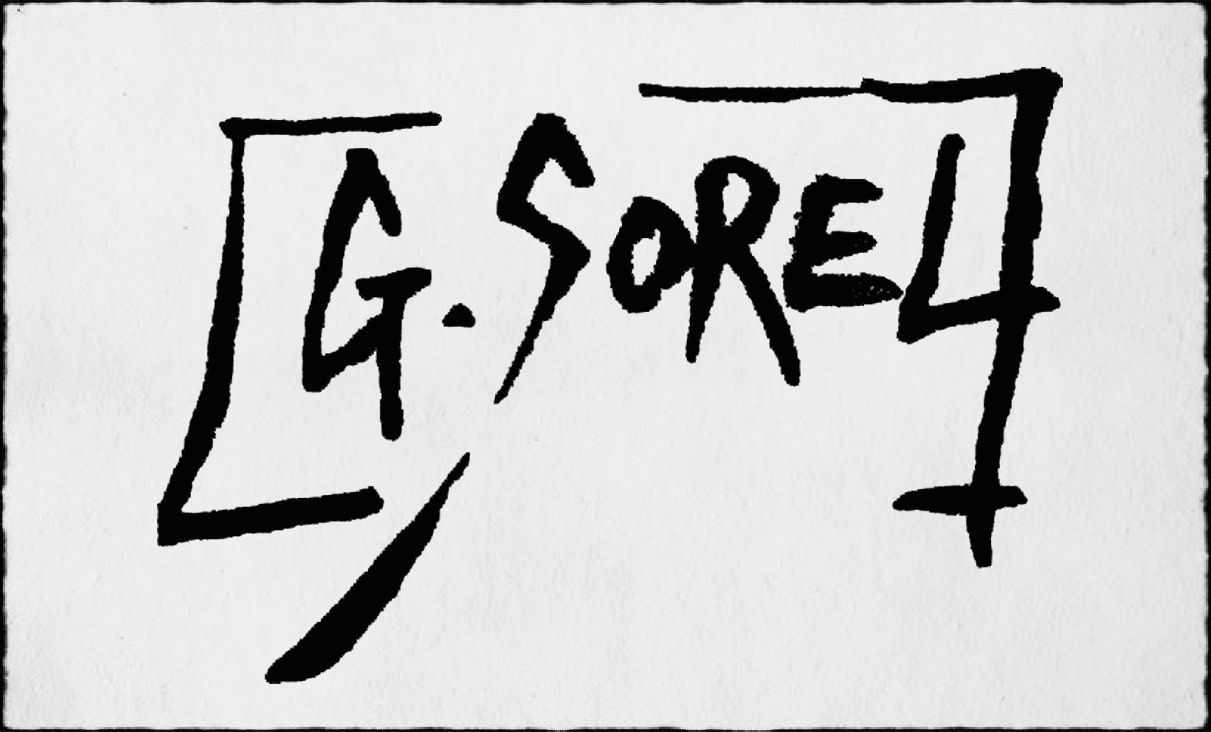
A signing by Guillaume Sorel at the Rencontres de l'Imaginaire 2012.

The idea for Rencontres de l'Imaginaire de Brocéliande dates to 2002. It was first realised in 2004 and included an exhibition and festival in Concoret and at the Château de Comper. In the years since it has been held solely at Comper. On the last weekend of July, the centre organises the opportunity for the authors and illustraters of graphic novels, writers and illustraters, to meet their public. It primarily facilitates book-signings, with equestrian spectacles, storytellers and lectures. Since 2011, the Recontres have been held in partnership with the communes of Tréhorenteuc and Paimpont. This intimate festival is above all else friendly.

The seventh festival which took place on 23 and 24 July 2011 was host to a score of artists and celebrities. Ouest-France, which described this festival as "essential", said that its objective is to, "montrer et donc faire découvrir tout ce qui se fait dans la littérature autour des légendes" (show and demonstrate everything done in the literature around these legends).

=== Semaine du Dragon ===
The Semaine du dragon was conceived and directed by the centre and the request of the Pays Touristique de l'Oust de Brocéliande. Pierre Dubois is the patron. It has been held every other year since 2009 (in odd numbered years), at the end of October or beginning of November, to coincide with the Celtic festival of Samhain. Various activities are organised by cultural organisations: storytelling, fire-eaters, tastings, games, meals, concerts, lectures, theatre, films and conferences. The evening of the 31 October is concluded with a vintage brew by the Brasserie Lancelot. In even numbered years, Le Retour de Flammes du Dragon (The Dragon Flashback), an event of lesser magnitude is held over three days.

== Plaudits and influence ==
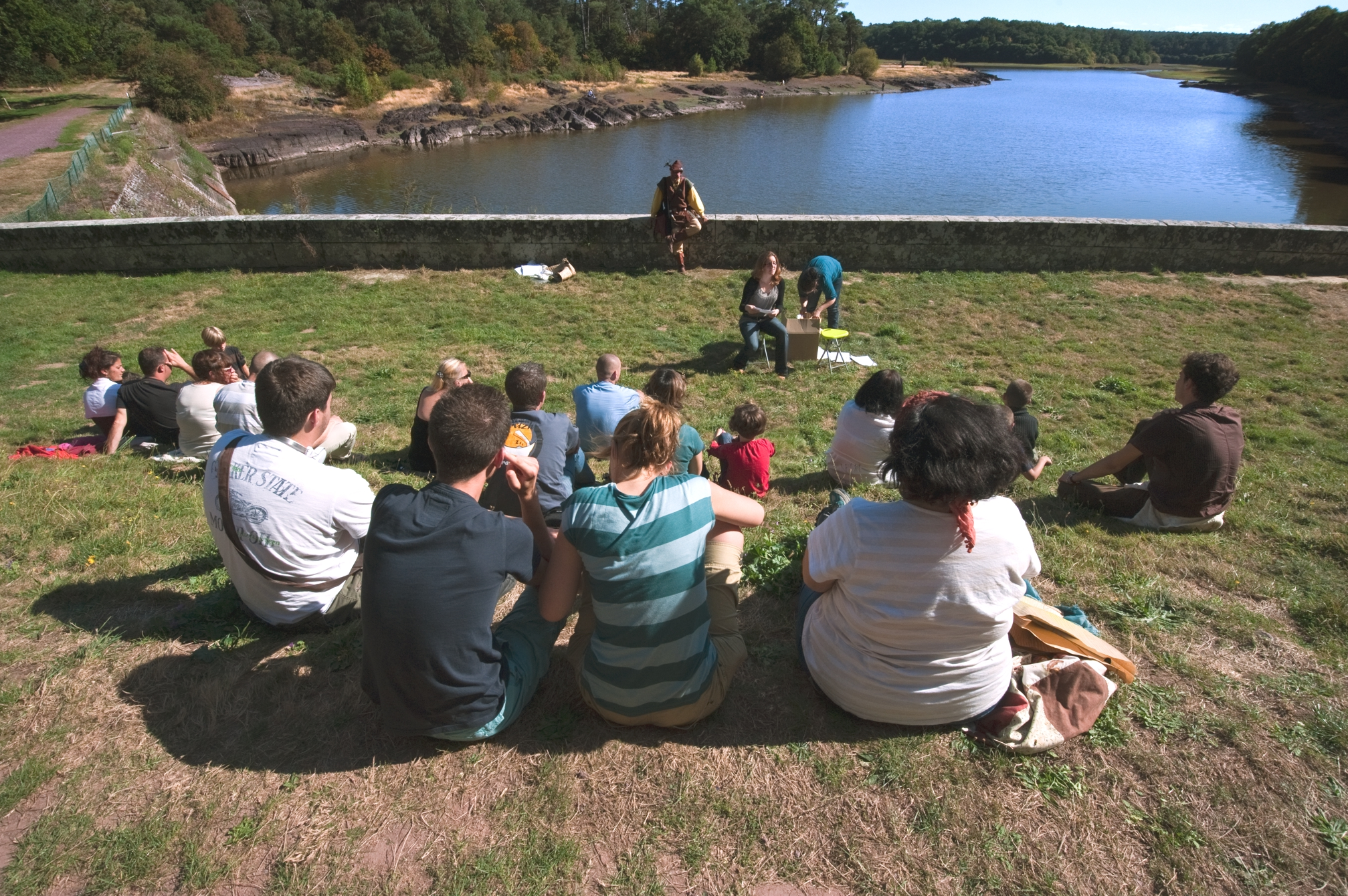
The team at the Centre de l'Imaginaire Arthurien prepare a workshop beside the lake at the Château de Comper during the European Heritage Days.

The Centre de l'Imaginaire arthurien is internationally recognised as a 'must see' for those interested in the Arthurian legends. RFI hailed the talents of the guides, the richness of the library and the convivial atmosphere. In early February 2012 the centre met a team from TF1 at the Château de Comper for a "Closeup on Rennes", in which Claudine Glot, Nicolas Mezzalira et Séverine Pineaux participated. The Centre de l'imaginaire arthurien has participated in shooting five other documentaries. The first, dedicated to the Forest of Brocéliande, was presented by Patrick Poivre d'Arvor. The centre also interviewed John Boorman, interviewed Christian-Joseph Guyonvarc'h twice, an interview with François Bourgeon by Pierre Dubois, a presentation of the legends of Brocéliande and an interview with Claudine Glot.

Among the most prestigious visitors, the centre includes Mario Vargas Llosa (who is a great admirer of chivalric romance)), Hugo Pratt, Jean Raspail, Laurent Voulzy, Jéromine Pasteur, Sylvain Tesson, Nolwenn Leroy and Patrick Poivre d'Arvor. Between 1988 and 2010, there were more than 300,000 visiters. Between 1990 and 1996, the centre's official website received 130 000 visiters, 26 000 people were guided through the forest and 600 classes held (25 000 visitors, 180 classes and 7 000 people guided through the Forest in the single year of 1996).

The Petit Futé rommends, "Especially take the time to devote a long afternoon to discovering the Centre de l'Imaginaire Arthurien, and appreciate the beauty of the exhibits as well as exploring the libraries". The Guide du Routard mentions the "rich exhibitions" et d'un lieu où légendes et histoire se mélangent, où l'environnement participe à l'envolée de l'imagination. The MTV guide mentions the centre as a, "lieu propice à l'imagination et au voyage dans le temps, soulignant par ailleurs le très bon rapport qualité-prix des visites au Château de Comper" (a suitable place for the imagination and to travel time, further underlining the great value of visits to the Château de Comper). The Société d'histoire et d'archéologie de l'arrondissement de Saint-Malo has also hailed the quality of the exhibitions.

== Éditions Artus ==
Éditions Artus existed prior to the foundation of the Centre de l'Imaginaire Arthurien, its origin was in the journal of the same name published by the future founders of the centre. Published from 1979 to 1986, it contained in-depth articles devoted to the Celtic and Nordic countries in the fields of art, legends or history. The editorial board of the journal offered fine art books and research on these themes as well as postcards of drawings by Gustave Doré and the Breton landscape.

- de la Pinta, Carmelo (1986). Celtiques: Gravures, 1980-1986 (in French). La Gacilly. p. 60.
- Le Guillou, Phillipe (1987). La main à plume: sur la création littéraire (in French). La Gacilly.
- le Men, Yvon (1987). Marna (in French). La Gacilly. p. 61.
- Joannon, Pierre (1988). Le Rêve irlandais: thèmes et figures du nationalisme (in French). La Gacilly. p. 209.
- Durand, Gilbert (1988). Louédin: Féodalis (in French). La Gacilly. p. 111.
- Joannon, Pierre (1989). L'Irlande ou Les musiques de l'âme (in French). La Gacilly. p. 182.
- Genet, Jacqueline (1990). Deirdre et la renaissance celtique: Fiona MacLeod, George William Russell, William Butler Yeats (in French). La Gacilly. p. 189.
- Walter, Philippe (April 1990). Le Gant de verre. Le mythe de Tristan et Yseut (in French). Poiré-sur-Vie. p. 339. ISBN 2-911916-02-6.
- Pichon, Michèle (1990). Paulette Bacon : peintre de l'air et de l'eau (in French). La Gacilly. p. 40.
- Joannon, Pierre (1990). L'hiver du connétable: Charles de Gaulle et l'Irlande (in French). La Gacilly. p. 101.
- Le Guillou, Philippe; Dauce, Paul (1991). Immortels, Merlin et Viviane (in French). La Gacilly. p. 39.
- Joannon, Pierre (1990). L'hiver du connétable: Charles de Gaulle et l'Irlande (in French). La Gacilly. p. 101.
- Le Bris, Michel (1991). Aux vents des Royaumes: Chevalerie et chevaliers (with the illustrations of Gustave Doré) (in French). La Gacilly. p. 60.
- Busson, Sophie (1991). Femmes (in French). La Gacilly. p. 107.
- Genet, Jacqueline (1992). Deirdre: variations sur le mythe (in French). La Gacilly. p. 378.
- Cazenave, Michel (1992). Les Guerriers de Finn: Les dits de la mémoire (in French). La Gacilly. p. 309.
- Le Guillou, Philippe; Durand, Gilbert; Guyonvarc'h, Christian; Walter, Philippe (1992). Ouvrage collectif comportant des textes et photographies de etc (in French). La Gacilly. p. 101.
- Glenmor (1992). L'Homme du dernier jour suivi de Stèle pour Xavier Grall (in French). La Gacilly. p. 139.
- de la Pinta, Carmelo (1993). Songes: Peintures, dessins, gravures et pastels (in French). La Gacilly. p. 134. ISSN 0181-1835.
- Le Guillou, Philoppe; Hervoche, Jean (1995). Un donjon et l'océan: La Bretagne de Chateaubriand (in French). La Gacilly. p. 80.
- Le Guillou, Jean-Baptiste; Grison; Galéron, Bernard (1996). Femmes (in French). La Gacilly. p. 118.
- Le Bris, Michel; Hervoche, Jean; Koster, Pierre Paul; Glot, Hervé (September 1998). Écosse, Highlands et Islands (in French). La Gacilly. p. 154. ISBN 2-91191-604-2.
- Le Guillou, Philippe; Nagels, Marc; Hervoche, Jean; Boëlle, Yvon (September 2000). Des Bretagnes très intérieures (in French). Hoëbeke. p. 155. ISBN 978-2842301125.
- Lemonnier, Jean (October 2001). Songes: Peintures, dessins, gravures et pastels (in French). La Gacilly. p. 164.
- Centre de l'Imaginaire Arthurien; Chagford Filmmaking group (July 2010). Lanval (in French). La Gacilly.
