= Gabe Woolley =

American politician (born 1994)

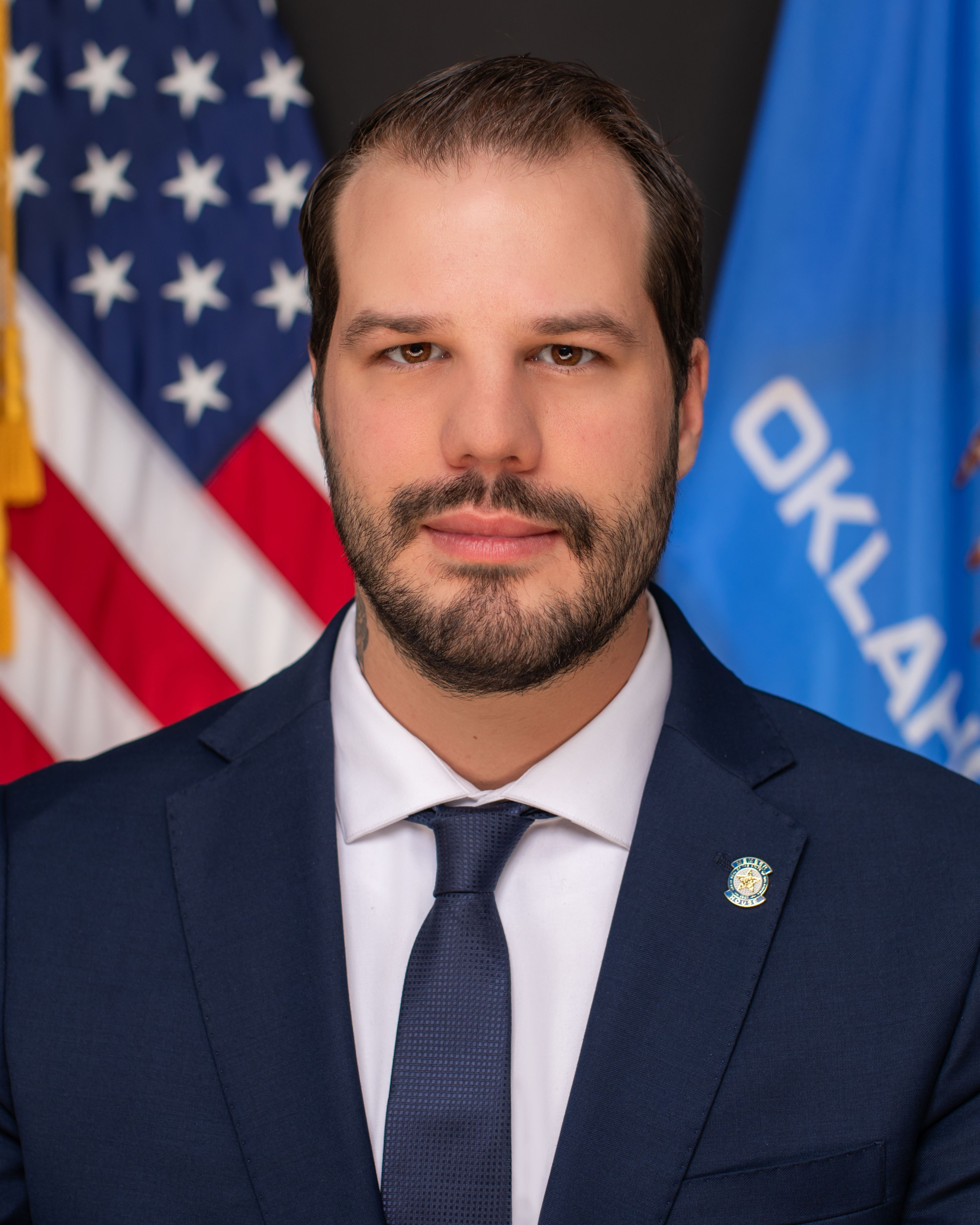
- Official portrait, 2024

Member of the Oklahoma House of Representatives from the 98th district
- Incumbent
- Assumed office November 20, 2024
- Preceded by: Dean Davis

Personal details
- Born: Gabriel Christian Woolley; September 17, 1994 (age 31) Jackson, Michigan, U.S.
- Party: Republican
- Education: Oklahoma Wesleyan University

Gabriel Christian Woolley (born September 17, 1994) is an American politician who has served in the Oklahoma House of Representatives representing the 98th district since 2024.

== Early life and career ==
Gabriel Christian Woolley was born on September 17, 1994, in Jackson, Michigan. He graduated from Tulsa Technology Center in 2012, Tulsa Hope Academy (a private Christian high school) in 2013, and Oklahoma Wesleyan University in 2020. His parents, William 'Bill' Woolley and Lisa Woolley, have been in a custody dispute over Woolley's nephew. The couple lost custody after being charged with the death of their grandson Elijah. Charges were later dropped after it was determined Elijah died of sudden infant death syndrome, but Elijah's brother was not returned to the family. Woolley runs the Rescue Clayton Podcast and Oklahoma Lion Media. He has partnered with Red River Media to create documentaries on his nephew's custody battle and criticizing "gender ideology."

He grew up in Broken Arrow, Oklahoma and worked in education for nine years including for Tulsa Public Schools, Tulsa Honor Academy, and in Phoenix, Arizona. While teaching he used PragerU videos. He was an Oklahoma Council of Public Affairs J. Rufus Fears Fellow, named after professor J. Rufus Fears, and member of the Steamboat Institute's emerging leaders council.

== Oklahoma House ==
In 2024, Woolley ran against incumbent Dean Davis to represent the 98th district of the Oklahoma House of Representatives. The Republican June primary also included J. David Taylor. Woolley advanced to an August runoff alongside Davis. In July, he spoke at a rally against child protective services in West Virginia. The director of the Oklahoma Department of Human Services, Deborah Shropshire, resigned after Woolley's family and Governor Kevin Stitt's father John Stitt public criticized the agency in August 2024. Stitt denied that Shropshire's resignation was related to Woolley's family's complaints.

He defeated Davis in the August runoff election with just over 50% of the vote. He defeated Democratic candidate Cathy Smythe in the November general election.

=== Tenure ===
Woolley was sworn in by Dustin Rowe on November 20, 2024. Later that month, Woolley voiced support for a grand jury investigation into the Oklahoma Department of Human Services. He was one of three state legislators, alongside Julia Kirt and Dick Lowe, to attend the December 2024 Oklahoma State Board of Education executive session after Attorney General Gentner Drummond issued an attorney general's opinion requiring the board to allow legislator to observe the meeting.

=== Committee positions ===
Woolley served as the vice chair of the general government committee in the 60th Oklahoma Legislature.

== Political positions ==
The Oklahoman described Woolley as an "uber-conservative."

=== Education ===
Woolley supports the inclusion of the history of Black Wall Street and the Tulsa Race Massacre in state history standards. He also supported Ryan Walters' proposed social studies standards prominent inclusion of the Bible.

=== Energy ===
Woolley spoke in opposition to wind and solar power in January 2025 alongside Attorney General Gentner Drummond and State Superintendent Ryan Walters.

=== LGBTQ+ rights ===
Woolley identifies as a "former member of the LGBTQ community" and has argued LGBTQ people should not be allowed to adopt children. He also opposes access to transgender health care for children. He has also compared access to gender affirming care to the Tuskegee Syphilis Study.

=== Paganism ===
Woolley criticized the Tulsa City Council for allowing a neopagan member of the faerie faith to give the invocation for one of their meetings, describing the prayer as "satanic."

=== Turnpikes ===
Woolley is a critic of the Oklahoma Turnpike Authority's power to raise the rate on toll roads in the state. He supports requiring a vote of the Oklahoma Legislature to approve proposed rate increases.

== Electoral history ==
2024 Oklahoma House of Representatives 98th district Republican primary
| Party | Candidate | Votes | % |
|---|---|---|---|
| Republican | Dean Davis (incumbent) | 911 | 42.4% |
| Republican | Gabe Woolley | 910 | 42.4% |
| Republican | J. David Taylor | 327 | 15.2% |
| Total votes | | 2,148 | 100% |

2024 Oklahoma House of Representatives 98th district Republican runoff
| Party | Candidate | Votes | % |
|---|---|---|---|
| Republican | Gabe Woolley | 1,254 | 50.6% |
| Republican | Dean Davis (incumbent) | 1,226 | 49.4% |
| Total votes | | 2,480 | 100% |

2024 Oklahoma House of Representatives 98th district general election
| Party | Candidate | Votes | % |
|---|---|---|---|
| Republican | Gabe Woolley | 10,871 | 66.7% |
| Democratic | Cathy Smythe | 5,435 | 33.3% |
| Total votes | | 16,306 | 100% |
