= The Great Encyclopedia of Faeries =

Book by Pierre Dubois

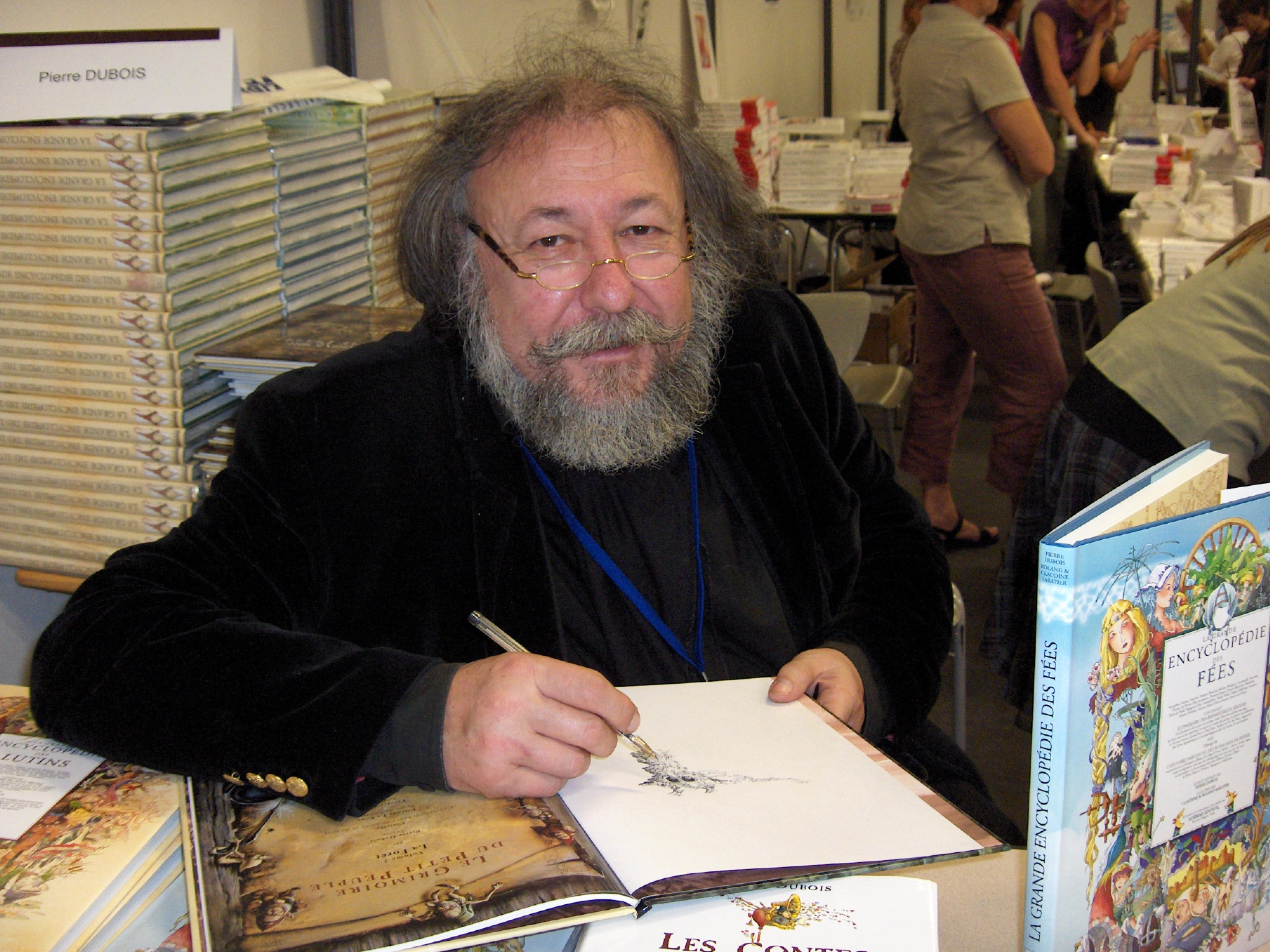
- The author, Pierre Dubois, with a copy of the book on the right
- Author: Pierre Dubois
- Original title: La Grande Encyclopédie des fées et autres petites créatures
- Illustrator: Claudine and Roland Sabatier
- Cover artist: Claudine and Roland Sabatier
- Language: French
- Genre: Encyclopedia
- Published: 1996
- Publisher: Hoëbeke
- Publication place: France
- ISBN: 2-84230-014-9

La Grande Encyclopédie des fées (full title: La Grande Encyclopédie des fées et autres petites créatures) is the second and best-known of Pierre Dubois's encyclopedic works about little people. Following on from La Grande Encyclopédie des lutins, it is devoted, as its title indicates, to fairies, and contains descriptions of over 100 fairy creatures in the form of stories from folklore, with presentation sheets and illustrations by Claudine and Roland Sabatier.

Published in 1996 by Hoëbeke and selling 80,000 to 90,000 copies in France, La Grande Encyclopédie des fées has been reprinted several times (in hardcover and paperback), and translated into English and Japanese. It was well received by critics, who praised its author's erudition and humor. At the time of its publication, it was the first French-language work on the subject.

== Content ==
The cover, illustrated as for the book's interior by Claudine and Roland Sabatier, features dozens of colorful fairies intermingled with one another. The title (La Grande Encyclopédie des fées), its subtitle (et autres petites créatures) and the presentation of the author and publisher (Secrets révélés par Pierre Dubois, illustrée par Claudine et Roland Sabatier et portés à la connaissance du public par Hoëbeke éditeur, rue du Dragon, Paris [Secrets revealed by Pierre Dubois, illustrated by Claudine and Roland Sabatier and published by Hoëbeke, rue du Dragon, Paris]) are a deliberate nod to early scholarly works.

La Grande Encyclopédie des fées presents a hundred or so fairies from popular folklore from all over the world (mainly France and the British Isles), with a storytelling text and a card summarizing each fairy's activities or favorite food. These presentations are divided into six chapters, each with an often poetic title and a particular theme. The first presents fairies who influence the climate, the second those of the hearth, the third those of Other Worlds, the fourth those of water, the fifth those of vegetation, and the last those of dreams and air.

Name	Pages	Name	Pages	Name	Pages
Tempestarii	16-17	Genies and gods of storm, rain, snow, and wind	18-19	Perchta	20-21
The Valkyries Valkyrja	22-23	Frau Holle	24-25	Babushka	26-27
Befana and the Christmas Aunties	28	Chauchevieille	29	Snegurochka	29
Fraü Gaude	29	Trottes-Vieilles	29	Koliada	29
Guillaneu	29	Aunt Arie	30-31	Lorialets	32-33
Saint Lucy, Cinderella, Sleeping Beauty	34-35	Bogie beasts	38-39	Ole Ferme-l’œil	40-41
La garderie des Bogies	42-43	Les larves	44-45	The dark sisters (Lamashtu, etc.)	46-47
Maja, Meija, Meiga	48-49	Les Gianes	50-51	The Laumės, the daughters of Laumé	52-53
Guivre	54-55	Mélusine	56-57	Codrilles and country dragons	58-59
Teugghia, Fausserolles and other fallen fairies	60-61	Marten, Peïlettes and Trouilles-de-Nouille	62-63	Matagots	64-65
Fairy godmothers	68-69	Banshee	70-71	Spinners and stone maidens	72-73
Night spinners	74-75	Midnight Washerwomen	76-77	Ielles	78-79
White ladies	80-83	Black ladies, red ladies	84-85	Gray Ladies and Ladies of the Well	86-87
blue ladies, fairies of the mountains	88-89	Apsarâ	90-91	Fairy-men and fairy-folk	92-93
Morgens	96-97	Mermaids	98-99	Selkie	100-101
	102-103	Nekker	104	Lange Wapper	105
Nāga	106-107	Groac'h	108-109	Vila	110-111
Fenettes, Gwragedd annwn...	112-113	The Swan Maidens	114-115	Nixie, Lorelei	116-117
Arbres-fays	120-121	And others...	122-123	Dryads and hamadryads	124-125
Old ShutEye	126-127	Pillywiggins	128-129	Herbal teas	130-131
Florales	132-133	Green ladies	134-135	Nymphs	136-137
Muses	138-139	White stag	140-141	Margot the fairy	144-145
Enfants de désir	146-147	Streghes	148-149	Cailleac Bheur	150-151
Nang-faa	152-153	Wilis	154-155	Encantada	156-157
Enchanteresses	158-159	Viviane	160-161	Morgan le Fay	162-163
Maeve, Medb, Mab	164-165	Hadas, Xanas, etc.	166-167	Folletto del vento	168-169

== Editions ==
La Grande Encyclopédie des fées has been reissued several times in French, and the cover illustration has changed between the first and subsequent editions. It has also been available in hardcover and softcover editions since 2008. It is translated into English by the British publisher Pavilion Books, and by Simon & Schuster in the United States. It is also available in Japanese.

== Reception ==
The book was very well received, with reviewers praising the fieldwork involved in cataloguing fairy information, the attention to detail, and the illustrations.

La Grande Encyclopédie des fées sold 80,000 to 90,000 copies in French.

Ah, if fairies had telephones, they'd be sure to find them in this marvellous phone book - shall we say? In this magical directory, they'd choose to entrust us with the enchanted number to call them in dreamland.

— Review published in the December 1996 issue of Lire magazine

== See also ==
- Pierre Dubois
- Fairy
- Encyclopedia

== Bibliography ==
- "La grande encyclopédie des fées". L'Express (in French). 1996.
- "La grande encyclopédie des fées". Lire (in French). December 1, 1996.
