= Faery Wicca =

Modern tradition of Wicca

Faery Wicca is a modern tradition of Wicca, developed in the 1970s by Cora Anderson and Gwyddion Pendderwen, two American pagans. It is polytheistic and focuses on nature worship; it is based around the pre-Christian Irish pantheon of Tuatha Dé Danann.

While originally with few adherents, some of its ideas became widespread through the writings of pagan author Starhawk. The 1980s Reclaiming Collective, which Starhawk was involved in, was largely based on Faery Wicca.

Scholar Henrik Bogdan listed it as one of the traditions comprising the "modern witchcraft movement".

== See also ==
- Celtic Wicca
- Faerie faith
- Pillywiggin
