= Dean Davis =

American politician

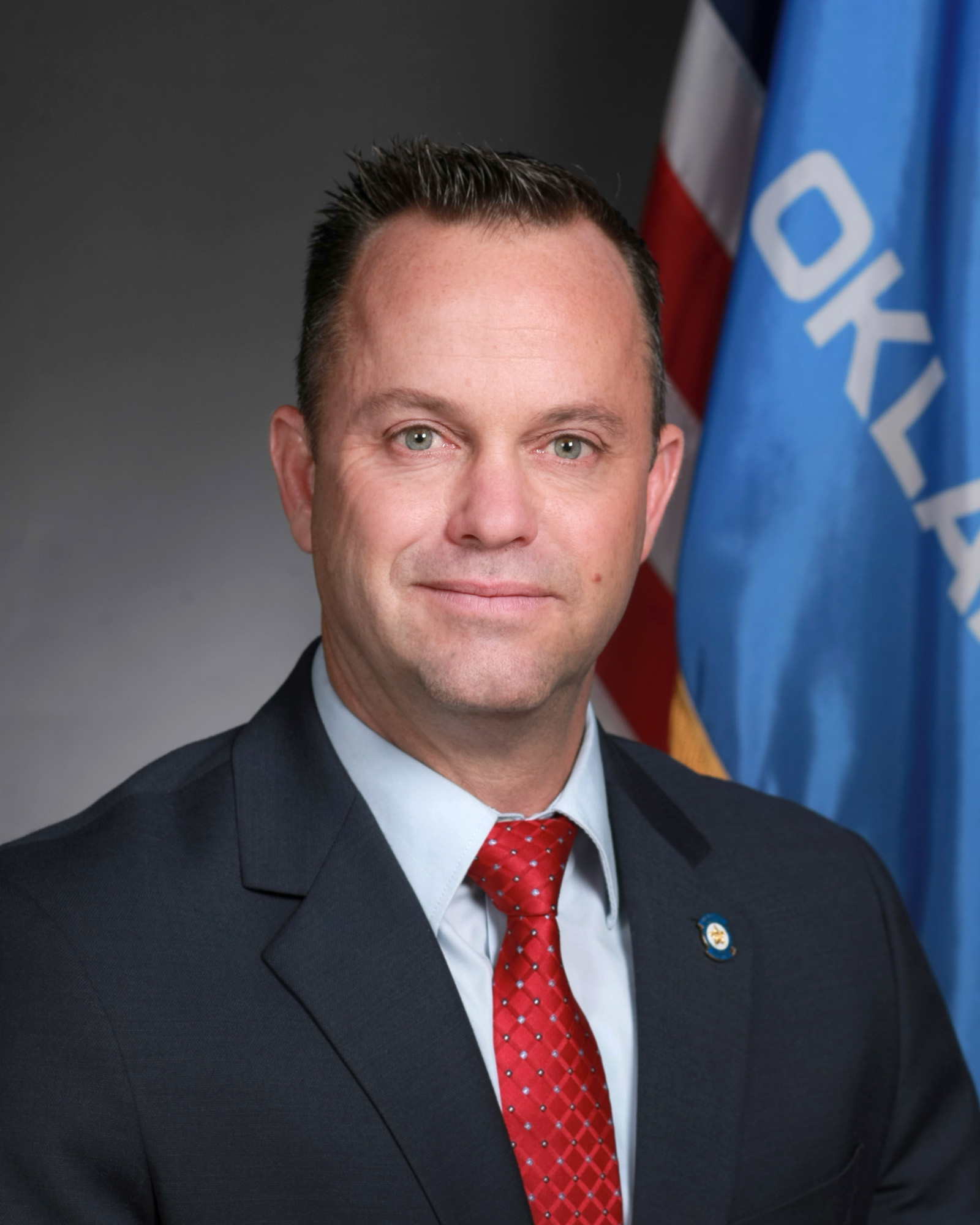
- Official portrait, 2018

Member of the Oklahoma House of Representatives from the 98th district
- In office 2019 – November 20, 2024
- Preceded by: Michael Rodgers
- Succeeded by: Gabe Woolley

Personal details
- Party: Republican

Dean Davis is an American politician who served as a member of the Oklahoma House of Representatives representing the 98th district from 2019 to 2024.

== Oklahoma House of Representatives ==
Davis authored House Bill 2011 that would allow for vehicles to be registered every two years. It passed the house in March 2023. In 2020, he was re-elected by default.

=== Criminal charges ===
In August 2019, Davis was arrested by Broken Arrow police for driving while intoxicated, speeding, and obstructing an officer. After being arrested, Davis called Representative T. J. Marti of Broken Arrow for bail and also called several other Republican representatives, expressing his confidence that the district attorney would drop charges once he spoke with them. The charges were later deferred, allowing him to plead no contest in exchange for six months probation.

Shortly after his probation expired in March 2023, he was arrested outside an Oklahoma City bar for public intoxication. During the arrest, he claimed legislative privilege prevented the officer from arresting him due to the ongoing legislative session. House Minority Leader Cyndi Munson later called for Republican lawmakers to be held "equally accountable", contrasting the cases of Davis, Ryan Martinez, and Terry O'Donnell (who were each facing criminal charges) with the censure of Representative Mauree Turner. (Note: Turner had been censured for sheltering a protester from police; reporting was divided on whether the protester hit the officer, or if the officer grabbed the protester, threw them to the ground, and attempted to pin them.) Davis was later censured on March 27.

== Electoral history ==
2024 Oklahoma House of Representatives 98th district Republican primary
Party	Candidate	Votes	%
Republican	Dean Davis (incumbent)	911	42.4%
Republican	Gabe Woolley	910	42.4%
Republican	J. David Taylor	327	15.2%
Total votes		2,148	100%

2024 Oklahoma House of Representatives 98th district Republican runoff
Party	Candidate	Votes	%
Republican	Gabe Woolley	1,254	50.6%
Republican	Dean Davis (incumbent)	1,226	49.4%
Total votes		2,480	100%
