= Château de Comper =

Castle in Brittany, France

Coordinates: 48°04′12″N 2°10′22″W

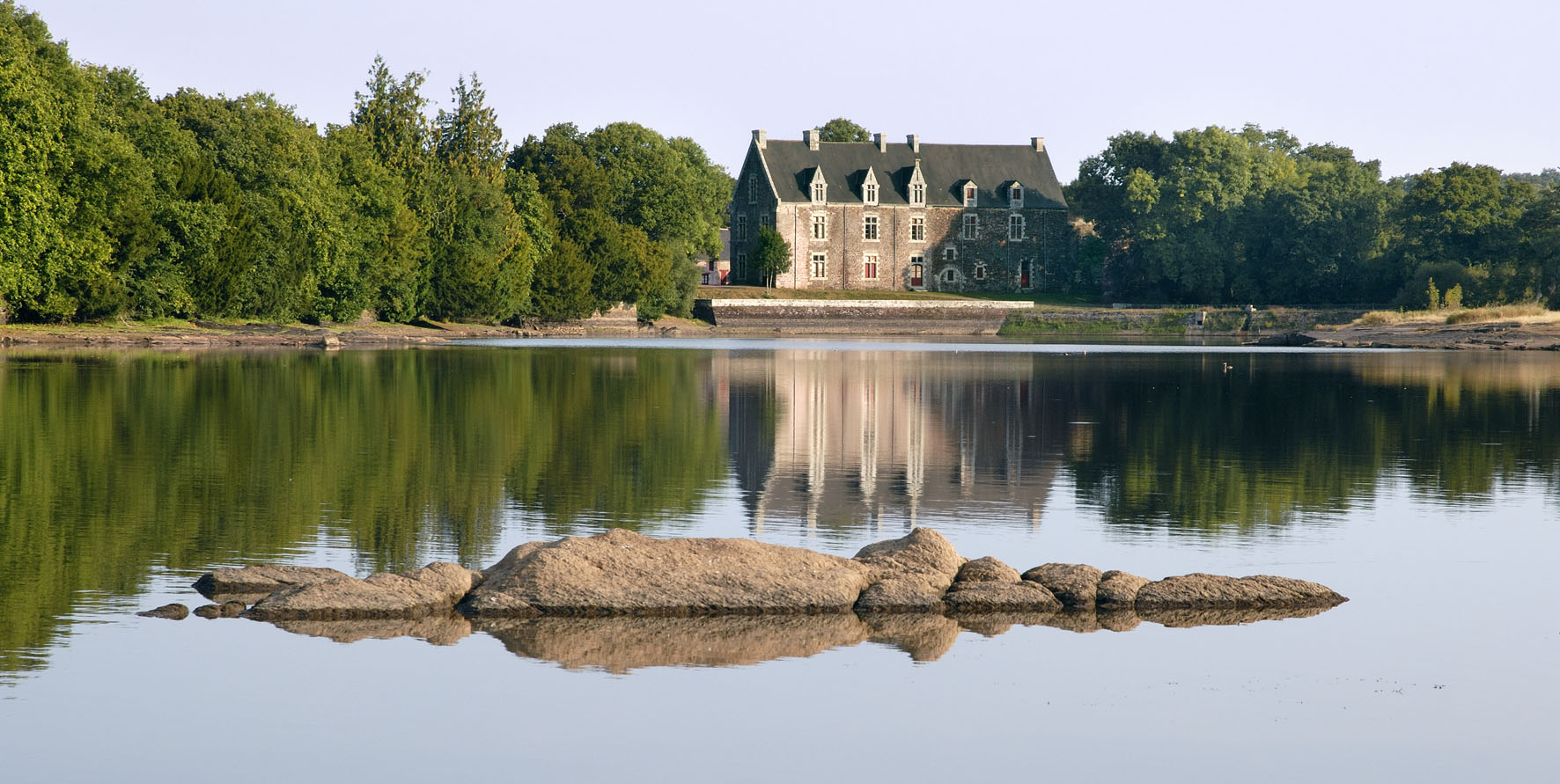
The Château de Comper in 2010

The Château de Comper is a former castle located in Paimpont forest (formerly known as Brocéliande), three kilometers to the east of the village of Concoret in the department of Morbihan in the region of Brittany, France. It has been rebuilt as a château. The name Comper, like Quimper, probably comes from the Breton word kemper, which means confluence. It is surrounded by several streams and lakes.

== History and structure ==
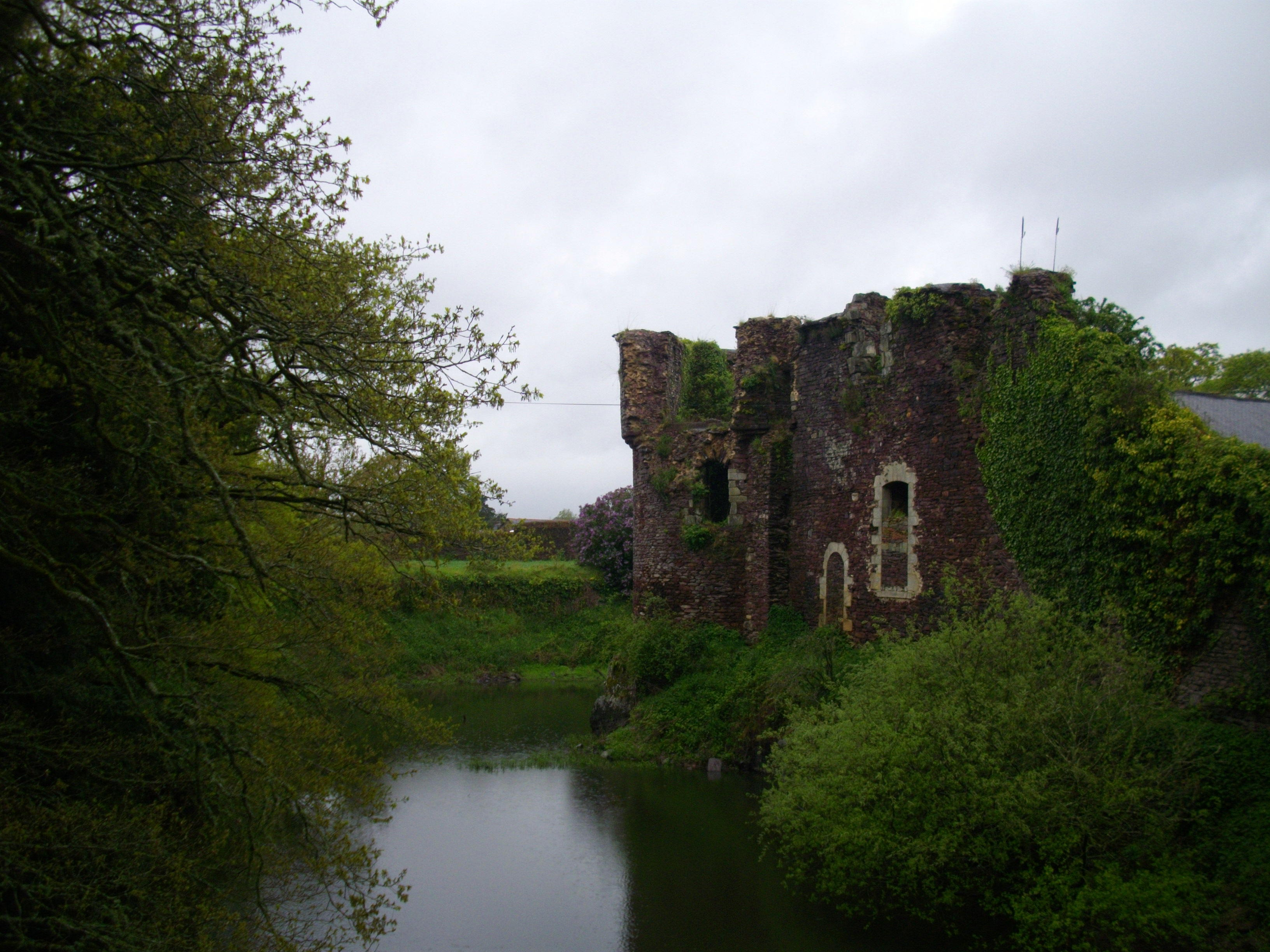
Remnants of the feudal castle

The castle was originally square, with towers at each of the four corners, linked by strong curtain walls. At the main door was a drawbridge.

The first owner of Comper is sometimes said to have been Salomon, King of Brittany in the 9th century. The castle is first recorded history associated with the Baron Raoul de Gaël-Monfort (Ralph de Gael), who was a companion of William of Normandy during the 11th century Norman conquest of England.

During the 13th century, Comper was considered one of the strongest castles in Brittany. For this reason, it has been the object of many battles and sieges. It has also changed owners several times in its history:

- In 1370, it was devastated by Bertrand du Guesclin.
- In the beginning of the 15th century, it became the vassal of the Dukes of Laval. In 1467, the Duke Guy XIV de Laval drew up the charte des usements et coutumes de Brécilien (charter of the uses and customs of Brocéliande), which was used to divide the forest into parcels and to define the rights and duties of everyone regarding each parcel.
- During the 16th century, Comper went to the Rieux family, then to the Coligny family.
- A famous episode in the history of Comper took place during the Wars of Religion, between the Catholic League and partisans of the king Henri IV. At the end of 1595, after a long resistance, the Duc de Mercœur's men failed to keep the castle. In reprisal, Henri IV dismantled the castle three years later.
- After this, Comper went to the la Trémoille family.
- During the Revolution, the revolutionary party burned half of the main building, on 28 January 1790. It was rebuilt during the 19th century by Armand de Charette, whose initials were left on numerous mantelpieces.

Today, the castle is listed as a monument historique by the French Ministry of Culture. Now the moat is dry, and the 19th-century mansion houses the exhibitions of the Centre de l'Imaginaire Arthurien about the Arthurian legend.

== Legend ==
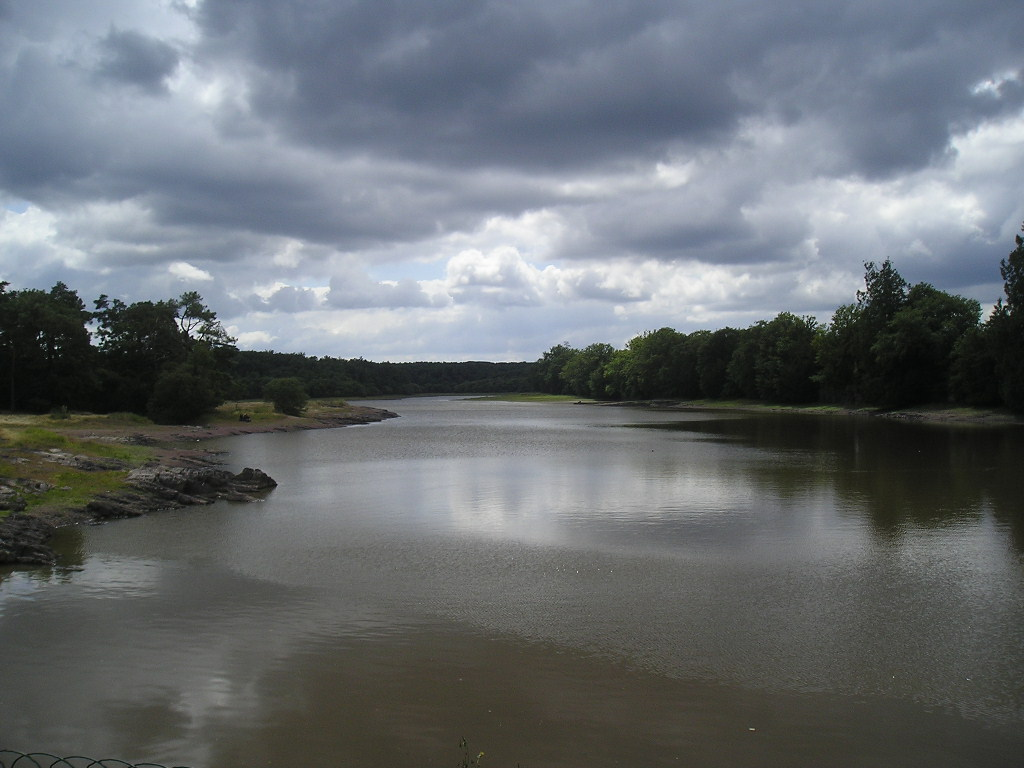
The pond of Comper, beside the castle, hides the palace of Viviane

The large pond of Comper is related to Viviane, the Lady of the Lake. In the legend, she lives in a crystal palace, built by Merlin and hidden under the waters of the lake.

== See also ==
- Centre de l'Imaginaire Arthurien
- List of castles in France
