= Deborah Shropshire =

American civil servant

Oklahoma Secretary of Human Services
- In office July 11, 2023 – September 13, 2024
- Appointed by: Kevin Stitt
- Preceded by: Justin Brown

Deborah Shropshire is an American civil servant who served as the Oklahoma Secretary of Human Services in the cabinet of Governor Kevin Stitt from 2023 to 2024. From June 2024 to September 2024, she served under the title "Chief Adviser," but de facto continued to serve as the Oklahoma Secretary of Human Services.

== Biography ==
From 2001 to 2015 Shropshire was the medical director for the Pauline E. Mayer Children’s Shelter and she helped develop the Fostering Hope Clinic. In 2014, she joined the Oklahoma Department of Human Services where she served as child welfare director, deputy director of communications, and medical director. She was appointed as the first woman director of the Oklahoma Department of Human Services on January 10, 2023, by Governor Kevin Stitt. On July 11, 2023, she was appointed Oklahoma Secretary of Human Services. In June 2024, she was transitioned from secretary to "chief advisor" after Attorney General Gentner Drummond wrote an attorney general opinion on cabinet secretaries and dual officeholding. She resigned effective September 13, 2024. Stitt denied her resignation was related to the Woolley family's custody dispute.
