= Pillywiggin =

Tiny fairies in English and Irish folklore

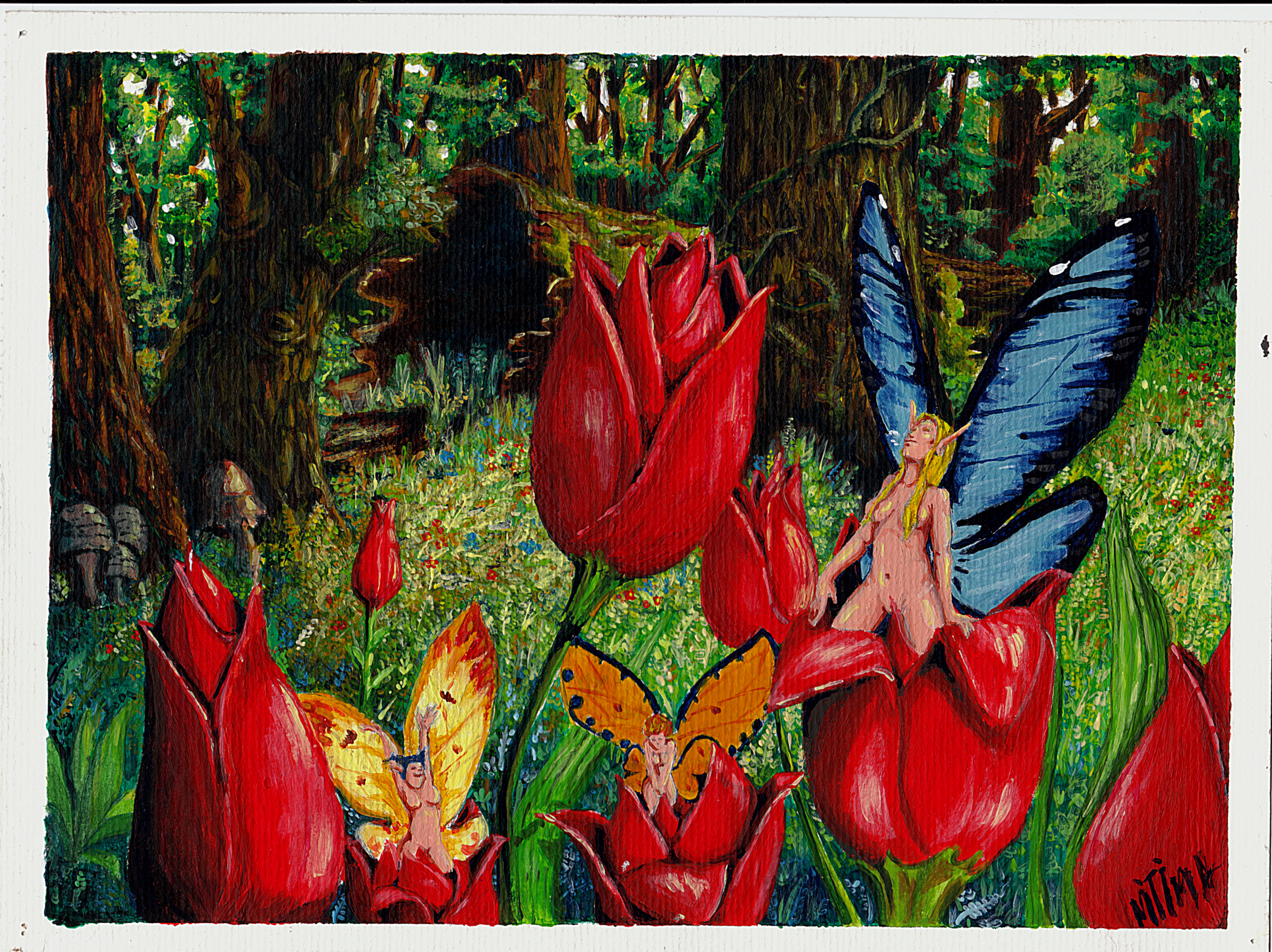
- Little fairies with butterfly wings, close to the description of pillywiggins.
- Grouping: Popular folklore
- Sub grouping: Fairy and Goblin
- Country: Great Britain and Ireland
- Details: Very small size, habitat flora

Pillywiggins are tiny goblins and fairies, guardians of the flora, mentioned in English and Irish folklore. Tiny in size, they have the antennae and wings of a butterfly or dragonfly, live in groups and spend their time frolicking among the flowers.

They are described by Nancy Arrowsmith, and later by Pierre Dubois and others in The Great Encyclopedia of Fairies and Lessons in Elficology.

== Origin ==
Pillywiggins are fairies from English folklore, associated with spring flowers and personifying the "divine essence of plants". They are mentioned in the folklore of Great Britain and Ireland. Pierre Dubois cites the alvens of Holland and certain fairies on the border of the Belgian Ardennes, who play similar roles.

The name "Pillywiggin" appeared in 1977 in the American Nancy Arrowsmith's Field Guide to the Little People, who believes that the name of these creatures comes from the English county of Dorset. It is also found in a collection by American folklorist Tristram Potter Coffin, dated 1984.

Pillywiggins are also mentioned in the esoteric work of Faery Wicca author Edain McCoy (1994), who classifies them among the elemental fairies, citing their preference for the shade of great oaks (a characteristic also present in Bane's description), and describing a very seductive pillywiggins queen, who goes by the name of Ariel and rides bats.

== Description ==
Author Catherine Rager (2003) describes them as pixies, while Theresa Bane associates them with fairies. Winged, they usually measure a centimetre, but can change size. Their food consists of dew and pollen. They are trooping fairies, creatures that live in groups. They have no particular interest in human beings, but may participate in some of their activities, such as wedding ceremonies and other celebrations. Unlike other fairies in British folklore, they are not known for playing tricks on humans.

According to Pierre Dubois, they are the tiniest of the elven gentry, along with Lincolnshire's Tiddy. "Wonderfully beautiful" thanks to their butterfly-like attributes, they are fond of English parks and gardens, in all parts of the UK except the Midlands, as well as in Ireland. There, they spend their time playing and frolicking. They are the guardian spirits of small flora, living to the rhythm of the plants they protect. They hibernate from November to April, until the cuckoo chirps.

They are said to ignore humans, preferring to dance among the wildflowers in the shade of tall oaks, where they are usually found. Their popular representations show them riding bees from flower to flower, or themselves the size of a bee.

According to gardening specialists Karan Davis Cutler and Barbara W. Ellis, English folklore mostly associates pillywiggins with the tulip.

== Mentions in fiction and video games ==
Pillywiggins gave their name to Julia Jarman's children's novel Pilliwiggins and the Tree Witch. In Alexander of Teagos, Paula Porter describes pillywiggins as beings that are "silent, but speak to your heart". They can also be found in fantasy novels, such as Rebecca Paisley's A Basket of Wishes, Brian Cullen's Seekers of the Chalice, Tiffany Trent's By Venom's Sweet Sting, Tiffany Turner's The Lost Secret of the Green Man, which describes them as guardians of wildflowers, and other works of fiction.

The yellow pillywiggin and the red pillywiggin are notable enemies of the Final Fantasy XI game, akin to bees.

In his children's book Leçons d'elficologie, Pierre Dubois presents a plate depicting the metamorphosis of a young pillywiggin into a butterfly fairy. A nursery rhyme published in an Australian children's book describes singing Pillywiggin. A modern Italian storybook evokes the proximity of Pillywiggins to foxglove and bellflower.

Multicolored Pillywiggin is the title of a children's song on Pakita's album Viens vite... Je t'invite, released in 2007.

== Bibliography ==
- Bane, Theresa (2013-09-04). Encyclopedia of Fairies in World Folklore and Mythology. McFarland. ISBN 978-0-7864-7111-9.
- Dunwich, Gerina (1990). The Concise Lexicon of the Occult. Carol Pub. Group. p. 211. ISBN 978-0-8065-1191-7.
- Brasey, Édouard (1999). Fées et elfes. L’univers féerique (in French). Pygmalion. p. 230. ISBN 978-2-85704-575-5.
- Heath, Jennifer (2000). The echoing green: the garden in myth and memory. Plume. p. 252. ISBN 978-0-452-28166-0.
- Rager, Catherine (2003). Dictionnaire des fées: et du peuple invisible dans l'Occident païen. Petits dictionnaires bleus. Turnhout: Brepols. ISBN 978-2-503-51105-4.
- Rose, Carol (1996-12-31). Spirits, Fairies, Gnomes and Goblins: An Encyclopedia of the Little People. Bloomsbury Academic. p. 261. ISBN 978-0-87436-811-6.
