= Arthuriana =

- Discipline: Literature
- Language: English

Publication details
- History: 1979 to present
- Publisher: Scriptorium Press (United States)
- Frequency: quarterly

Standard abbreviations
- ISO 4: Arthuriana

Indexing
- ISSN: 1078-6279
- JSTOR: arthuriana

Links
- Journal homepage

Arthuriana is a quarterly journal published by the North American branch of the International Arthurian Society. Its focus is on the Arthurian legend. The four annual issues are published in February, May, October, and December.

== History ==
The journal began in 1979 as a quarterly newsletter, Quondam et Futurus: Newsletter for Arthurian Studies, published with support from Birmingham–Southern College and edited by independent scholar Mildred Leake Day of Gardendale, Alabama.

Henry Hall Peyton III, a professor at Memphis State University, founded a similar newsletter, Arthurian Interpretations, in 1986. In 1991 the two publications merged to become the quarterly journal Quondam et Futurus: A Journal of Arthurian Interpretations, with Peyton as editor. In 1994 the journal was renamed Arthuriana.
