= Michel Le Bris =

French writer, translator, novelist, and essayist (1944–2021)

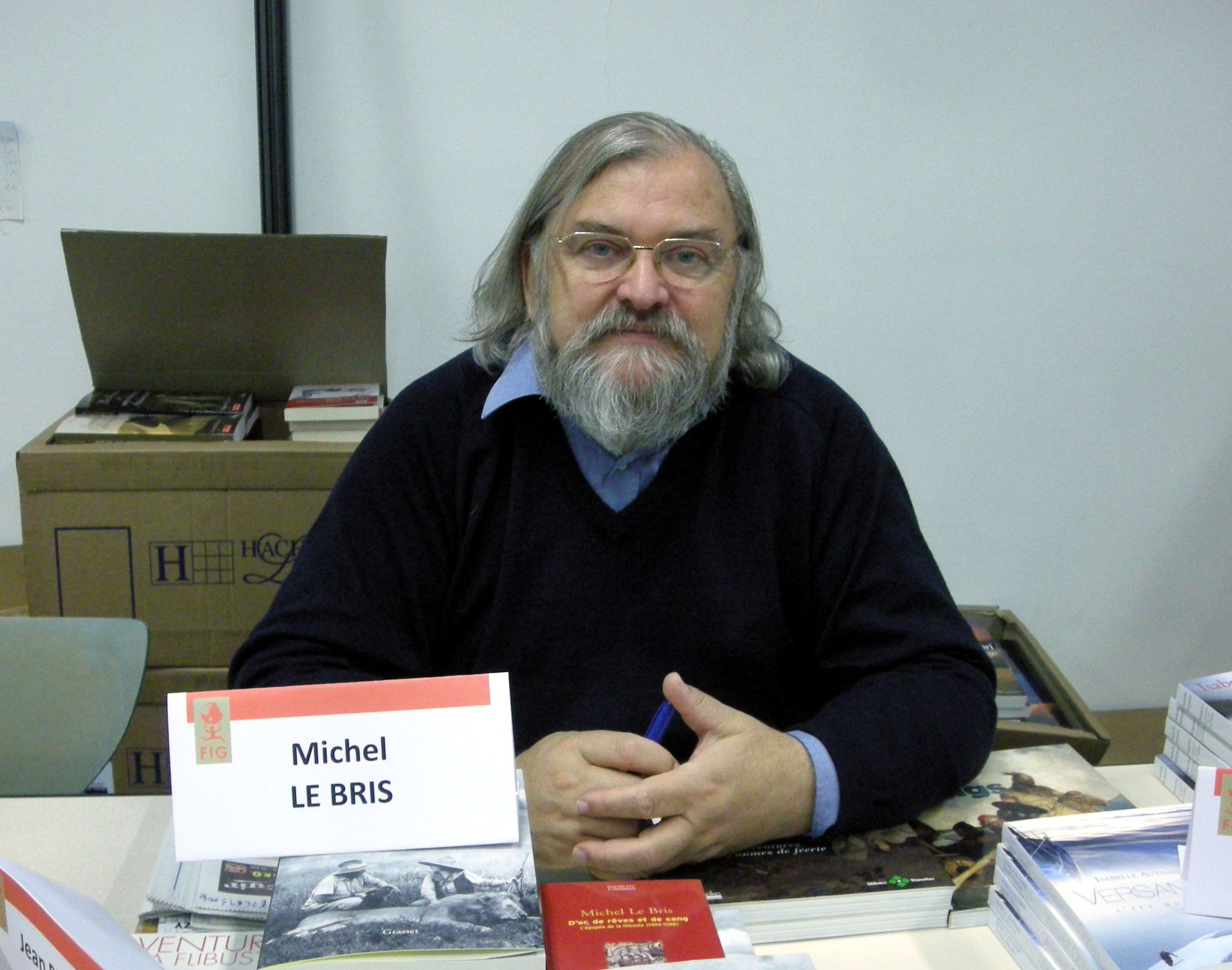
Michel Le Bris in 2008

Michel Le Bris (1 February 1944 – 30 January 2021) was a French writer.

== Career ==
He was a specialist on Robert Louis Stevenson and the organizer of the Saint-Malo literary festival "Astonishing Voyageurs" which he started in 1990.

Le Bris' À travers l'Écosse was published in 1992. Lesley Graham makes a critical assessment of its evocation of Stevenson's Edinburgh in her essay "Questions of Identity on the Stevenson Trail in Scotland".

Michel Le Bris is a graduate of HEC Paris.
