= Faerie faith =

Wiccan branch

Faerie Faith is a Wiccan branch from the "Old Dianic" tradition (later renamed McFarland Dianic) through the work of Mark Roberts and his high priestess, Epona.

The Faerie Faith founded by Roberts and Epona is distinct from other Neopagan traditions with similar names: the Feri Tradition of Victor Anderson (circa 1960); the Radical Faeries group founded by gay men (1979); or the Faery Wicca of Kisma Stepanich (1998).

== History ==
The history of the Faerie Faith begins with "the Dallas Dianics," founded by Mark Roberts and Morgan McFarland in the Dallas/Ft. Worth area of Texas (in 1999, the name of the tradition was changed to the McFarland Dianic Tradition). McFarland, Roberts, and a third member together formed the Covenstead of Morrigana. According to the McFarland Dianic Homepage, "It was Mark who pointed out to Morgan the reference to "Dianic cults" in Margaret Murray's The Witch Cult in Western Europe. It spoke to their beliefs and practices, and they adopted the name "Dianic" for their tradition. Later that year, Mark and Morgan began creating rituals based on the Ogham. McFarland went on to initiate several high priestesses who hived off to start other covens. In 1979 she withdrew as high priestess, and now serves as matriarch and advisor to the Council of High Priestesses of the McFarland Dianic Tradition.

In 1979 Roberts moved to Atlanta, Georgia, where he met a woman named Epona. Roberts taught her the lessons he had written while with McFarland, and Epona became a high priestess and the founder of the "Eponian" branch of the McFarland Dianics - what is now known as the Faerie Faith. Roberts most likely took the name for this new tradition from The Fairy-Faith in Celtic Countries by W.Y. Evans-Wentz, published in 1911. This book is an oral history and describes a variety of folk beliefs and practices, many still extant at the time the book was written.

Roberts returned to Dallas and started a new tradition, called Hyperborea. Epona continued to teach the Faerie Faith tradition she and Roberts developed, and today there are members of the Faerie Faith spread out across the Southeastern United States.

== Beliefs and practices ==
The characteristic of Faerie Faith is the use of the Beth-Luis-Nion "Celtic tree calendar", allegedly invented by Robert Graves in his book, The White Goddess: a Historical Grammar of Poetic Myth. The system is based on Graves's re-interpretation of the Celtic ogham alphabet; however, scholars believe Graves's invention is not based on any actual Celtic calendar. In the Faerie Faith, specific lessons are associated with each lunar month, and students experience personal transformation in connection to each tree/letter.

== See also ==
- Faery Wicca
- Celtic Wicca
