= Concoret =

Commune in Brittany, France

Concoret Konkored
- Commune
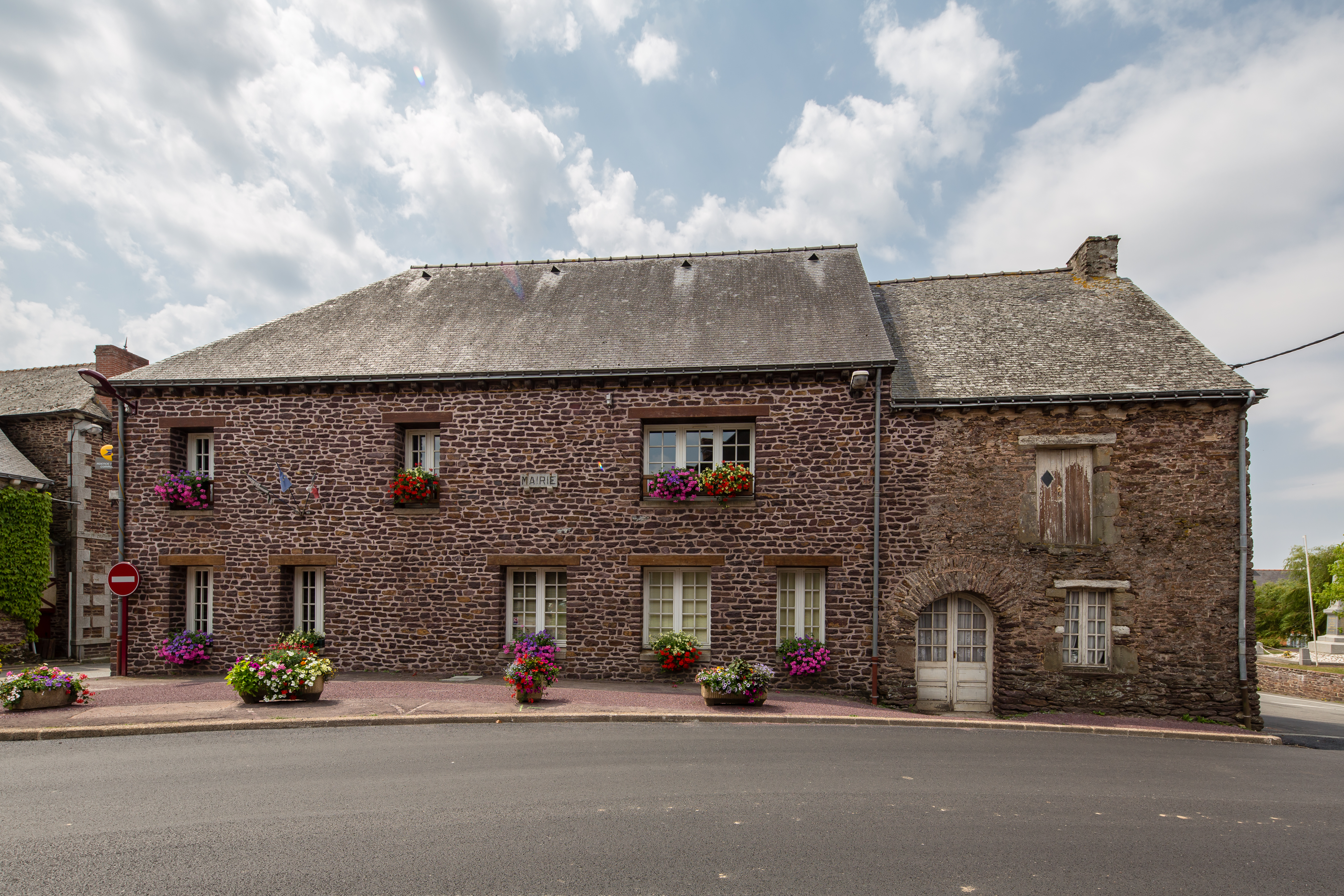
- The town hall in Concoret

- Coat of arms
- Location of Concoret
- Location within France Location within Brittany
- Coordinates: 48°03′54″N 2°12′18″W
- Country: France
- Region: Brittany
- Department: Morbihan
- Arrondissement: Pontivy
- Canton: Ploërmel
- Intercommunality: Ploërmel Communauté

Government
  - Mayor (2026–32): Ronan Coignard
- Area^{1}: 15.76 km^{2} (6.08 sq mi)
- Highest elevation: 133 m (436 ft)
- Lowest elevation: 66 m (217 ft)
- Population (2023): 758
  - Density: 48.1/km^{2} (125/sq mi)
- Time zone: UTC+01:00 (CET)
  - Summer (DST): UTC+02:00 (CEST)
- INSEE/Postal code: 56043 /56430
- ^{1} French Land Register data, which excludes lakes, ponds, glaciers > 1 km^{2} (0.386 sq mi or 247 acres) and river estuaries.

Concoret (Konkored in Breton) is a commune in the Morbihan department of Brittany in north-western France.

== Demographics ==
Inhabitants of Concoret are called in French Concoretois.

== See also ==
- Communes of the Morbihan department
- Château de Comper
