= Pierre Dubois (author) =

French writer

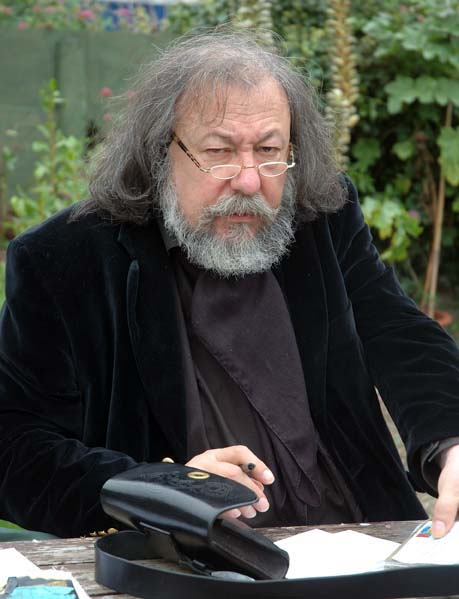
- Pierre Dubois (2006)
- Born: 19 July 1945 (age 81); Charleville-Mézières, France
- Occupations: Scriptwriter for bande dessinée, writer, Storyteller, lecturer
- Writing career
- Language: French
- Genres: Fairy tale, Fantasy
- Notable works: La Grande Encyclopédie des fées La Grande Encyclopédie des lutins La Grande Encyclopédie des elfes
- Notable awards: Honor Award, Spring of the Legends of Monthermé (2010)

Pierre Dubois (born 19 July 1945) is a French writer, bande dessinée scriptwriter, storyteller, and lecturer. He is known for his work on Fairy folklore and little people. His writing often incorporates elements of Anglo-Saxon fantasy. He coined the term "elficology" (elficologie) to describe the study of fairies and similar beings.

Dubois has published encyclopedias on fairies, Imps, and elves. He has also written for the magazine Spirou and collaborated on various comic book series.

== Early life and education ==
Pierre Dubois was born in Charleville in the Ardennes, which was under Allied military administration after World War II at the time. His father was an industrial designer. Dubois spent part of his childhood near the Ardennes forest and developed an interest in local legends and folklore. He began writing and drawing at a young age.

Dubois later moved to Valenciennes in the Nord department. He attended the École des Beaux-Arts de Valenciennes, where he studied drawing and etching.

== Early career ==
Dubois left art school early to pursue writing and illustration. He initially worked as an illustrator for magazines. He also began collecting local legends. He met folklorist Arnold Van Gennep's daughter and the writer Claude Seignolle, who encouraged his interest in folklore. He also credits writer Gilles Lapouge as an influence.

== Later career ==
Dubois is a commentator at France 3 Bretagne and a member of the Imaginary Arthurian Centre, based in Brocéliande. His career in comics began with contributions to Spirou magazine in 1984, where he wrote the series Le Grand Fabulaire du Petit Peuple, illustrated by René Hausman. This partnership also resulted in two cartoon episodes for the magazine. He went on to collaborate with various artists on other series, including Torte with Lucien Rollin, Pixies with Rivard, and Lutins with Stéphane. He published the album Saskia des vagues with Lucien Rollin and the Red Caps series with Duval. He also edited La Grande Encyclopédie des lutins and The Great Encyclopedia of Faeries, illustrated by Claudine and Roland Sabatier.

== Awards ==
Dubois received the Honor Award at the Spring of the Legends of Monthermé in 2010 for his work on fairies.
