= Henri Gillard =

French Roman Catholic priest (1901–1979)

Father Henri Gillard
- Rector of Tréhorenteuc
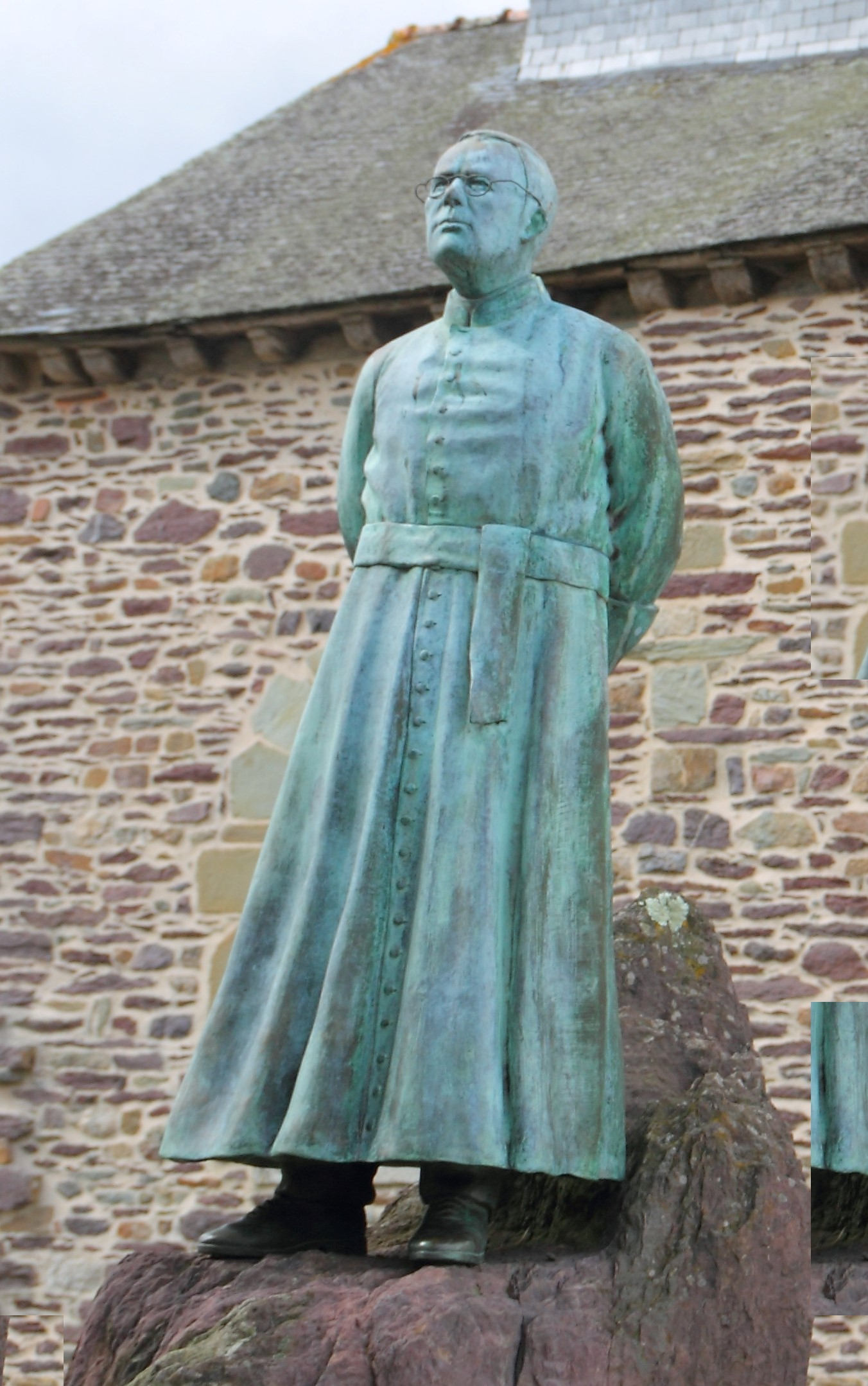
- Statue of Henri Gillard outside Église Saint-Onenne at Tréhorenteuc, Morbihan, Brittany, France
- Installed: 1942
- Term ended: 1962
- Predecessor: Father Renaud
- Successor: Rectorship abolished

Orders
- Ordination: 20 December 1924

Personal details
- Born: 30 November 1901; Manoir de Trénaleuc, Guégon, Morbihan, Brittany, France
- Died: 15 July 1979; Plumergat, Morbihan
- Buried: Église Saint-Onenne, Tréhorenteuc, Morbihan

Henri Gillard (30 November 1901 – 15 July 1979), also known as Father Gillard, the abbé Gillard or as le recteur de Tréhorenteuc (his pen-name), was a Breton priest attached to the Église Saint-Onenne in Tréhorenteuc from 1942 to 1962. As soon as he arrived, he had this small communal church in the department of Morbihan restored, decorating it with paintings that mixed the wonders of Celtic legend with the Christian faith, through the symbolism of the Holy Grail. He popularized the Arthurian legend through his numerous works and the guided tours of the nearby Val sans retour which he organised. During his years of ministry he guided visitors and lodged them in the church. His efforts energized the commune of Tréhorenteuc, at that time suffering a major rural exodus, to make it a popular tourist destination. Disavowed and ejected from his post by the Catholic hierarchy in 1962, Father Gillard was finally rehabilitated after his death in 1979, and buried in the church of Tréhorenteuc. A statue of him has been erected and an association has been formed to defend his works and his heritage.

== Life ==
Henri Gillard was born in Guégon, Morbihan, on 30 November 1901 at the manor of Trénaleuc. His ancestors had been farmers for several generations. He studied at Ploërmel and then at the major seminary of Vannes, before being ordained a priest on 20 December 1924 at the age of 23. First a college professor, he became a curate at Plumelec, then was appointed to Crédin where his superiors already did not appreciate his originality. He was mobilized for the Second World War in 1940 and returned to Crédin after the Fall of France. During the German occupation, he took refuge in his reading.

In March 1942 he arrived at Tréhorenteuc as the new rector of the parish. Because of his original and unconventional ideas, the diocese of Vannes probably wished to sideline him in this isolated rural village, accessible only by dirt roads, whose church was falling into ruins. Tréhorenteuc, affected by rural flight, was said to be the chamber pot of the diocese. Father Gillard sympathized with the poor farmers of the commune, shared their life, and became their parish clerk. With the 150 inhabitants of Tréhorenteuc, he discerned the potential of the legends of Brocéliande and the nearby Val sans retour. In redecorating the church of Tréhorenteuc (at his own expense) he drew on themes from different traditions, Celtic, Christian, and esoteric. The artworks he commissioned include two wooden statues of Saints Onenne and Judicaël by the sculptor Edmond Delphaut, a series of stained-glass windows by Henry Uzureau illustrating the life of St Onenne, a series of paintings, altarpieces and other fittings by Karl Rezabeck and Peter Wisdorff (both released German prisoners-of-war), and a mosaic of the white hart of Brocéliande, symbolizing Christ, by Jean Delpech. Many of these artworks depict Arthurian subjects, including the Holy Grail. The Grail appears in the east window with Joseph of Arimathea and Christ, and it manifests itself to King Arthur and his knights in a painting above the sacristy door. Morgan le Fay figures in one of a series of paintings on the Stations of the Cross, notable for setting the story in local Breton scenes.

Gillard was putting himself in tune with the new socio-economic practices of his time, responding to the demands of tourism which had resulted from the arrival of paid holidays and the progress of the automobile. The first tours were created in the post-war years: coaches went on Sundays from Rennes to Tréhorenteuc, where Father Gillard was responsible for showing people around the Val sans retour. He presented the symbolic and religious aspects of the place, and did not hesitate to accommodate visitors in his restored church, like a youth hostel. Henri Gillard appeared on television (France 3) and radio (Europe 1), presenting the locations of the Arthurian legend. From 1943 he had small tour guides published by Éditions du Val. He associated with Breton intellectuals like Xavier de Langlais and Jean Markale. His great communication skills and his personality raised the profile of this village, which gradually attracted visitors from all over France. In the context of a declining agricultural economy his action allowed the municipality to find some tourist income. His church became more a cultural centre than a place of worship, "for lack of inhabitants".

In 1962 his ideas attracted the attention of the diocesan authorities. The church hierarchy, shocked by his actions and the way he mixed Christianity with pagan themes, moved him and prevented him from accessing the Sainte-Onenne church. His last years were spent in a retirement home for clergy in Sainte-Anne-d'Auray, but he was still able to visit Tréhorenteuc thanks to the hospitality of Father Rouxel of the nearby village of Néant-sur-Yvel, and to meet admirers and enthusiasts. It was not until his death in July 1979 that the diocese of Vannes officially rehabilitated him, and allowed him to be buried in his church.

== Published works ==
Henri Gillard wrote some twenty booklets under the name of "Le recteur de Tréhorenteuc", two audiovisual booklets on the Epistles and the Gospel in the national museums, and an essay devoted to the Zodiac. Most of his works can now be seen in the Tréhorenteuc tourist office. His complete works are:

- La Sainte du Val-sans-Retour. A Ste Onenne: patronne des grandes familles (PDF). 1942.
- Guide de Tréhorenteuc (Morbihan). 1943.
- Le Val sans Retour (PDF). 1945.
- Curiosités et légendes de la forêt de Paimpont: en Bretagne sur le 48e parrallèle. 1951. New editions: 1955, 1980, 1996.
- Les Mystères de Brocéliande. 1953. New editions: 1980, 1996.
- La Mystique des Nombres dans les Beaux-Arts. 1955. Co-authored with Louis Hautecœur. New edition: 1980.
- Néant-sur-Yvel. 1955. New edition: 1980.
- Symbolisme et Mystique des Nombres en Brocéliande (PDF). 1956. New editions: 1980, 1996.
- Tréhorenteuc-Comper-Paimpont. 1959. New edition: 1980.
- Le Secret du Zodiaque. 1959. Co-authored with Étienne Drioton. New editions: 1980, 1996.
- Ploërmel et ses curiosités. 1960. New edition: 1980.
- Le Secret de Carnac et de Locmariaquer. 1961. New edition: 1980.
- Les Conventions artistiques. 1963. New edition: 1980.
- Avant-propos, in Boulé, Armand. Un pays au passé prestigieux: le Bois-de-la-Roche (PDF). 1965.
- Vérités et légendes de Tréhorenteuc. 1971. New editions: 1980, 1996.
- Les Épîtres dans les musées nationaux. 1971. New edition: 1980.
- L'Évangile dans les musées nationaux. 1971. New edition: 1980.
- Implantation en Brocéliande des Romans de la Table Ronde. 1972. New edition: 1980.
- L'église de Néant-sur-Yvel. 1975. New edition: 1980.
- Le Zodiaque: ses Signes, les Nombres Sacrés et les Idéogrammes. 1976. New edition: 1980.
- Les Mystères de Brocéliande. 1983. A collective re-edition of Les Mystères de Brocéliande (1953), La Mystique des Nombres dans les Beaux-Arts (1955), Symbolisme et Mystique des Nombres en Brocéliande (1956), Les Conventions Artistiques (1963), and Le Secret du Zodiaque (1959).
- Interprétations des Tableaux Religieux. 1985. In 2 volumes.
- L'église de Tréhorenteuc. 1987.
- Documents inédits "in memoriam". 1987. Co-authored with abbé Rouxel.

== Legacy ==
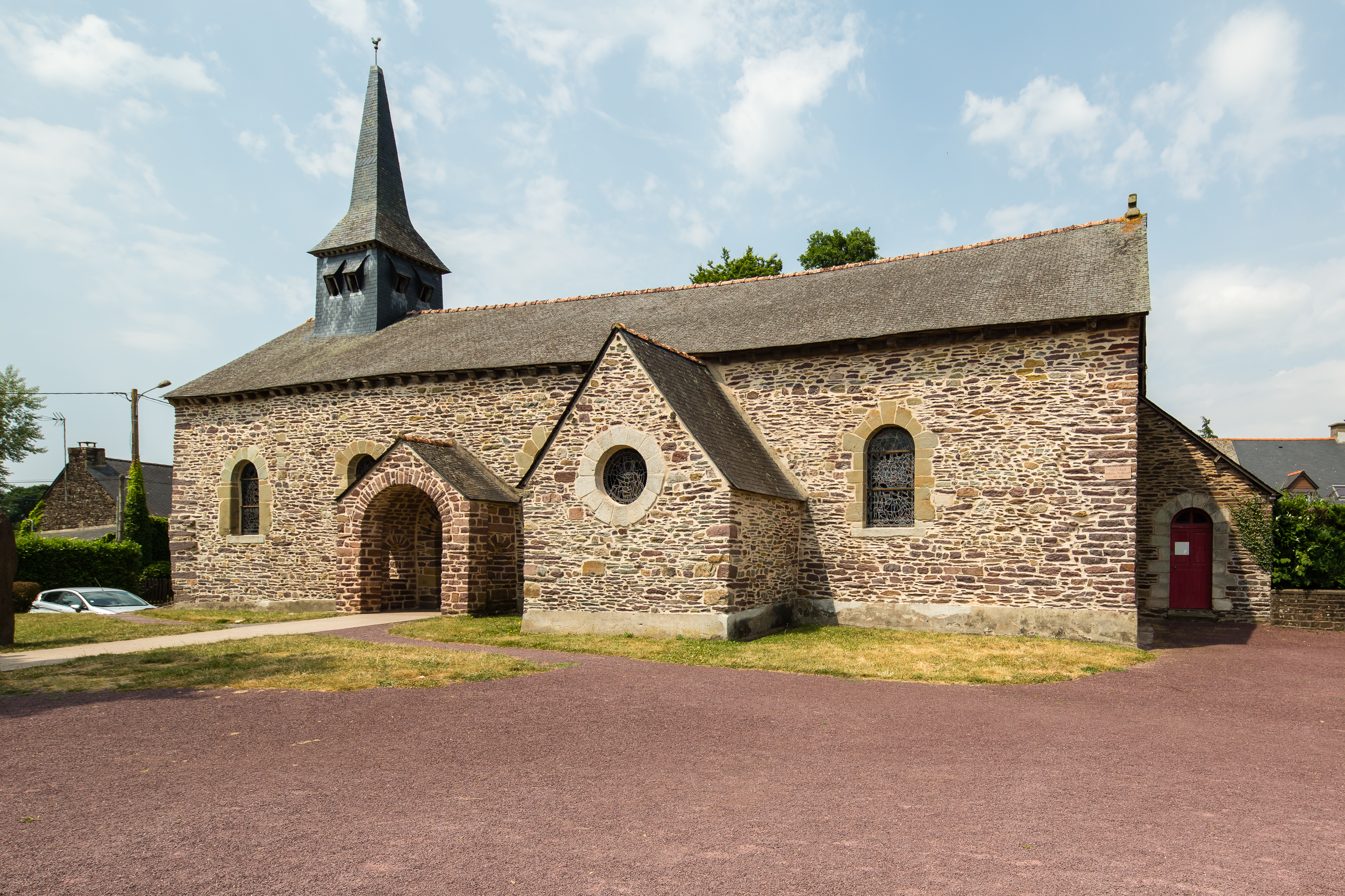
The Église Saint-Onenne, Gillard's parish church

Father Gillard's work and thought was an eclectic mix of Celtic legends and Christian faith. He left behind a famous phrase, "The door is within", and other esoteric reflections such as "What we see does not exist, but what we do not see does exist". He was also the last rector of Tréhorenteuc: after his departure, the religious charge of the little church was entrusted to the rector of Néant-sur-Yvel and the parish priest of Mauron. In 1994 the Association de sauvegarde des œuvres de l'Abbé Gillard (Association to safeguard the works of the Abbé Gillard) was created. During his years of service as a priest, Father Gillard met Jacques Bertrand, alias Jean Markale, who has since been considered his spiritual heir.

=== Statue ===
In 1998, a bronze statue of him was erected in front of the church. On 19 May 2021 tourists noticed the disappearance of this statue, asking if it was being restored. The date of the theft is unknown, neither the person who opened the church nor the inhabitants having noticed the disappearance of the statue. An appeal has been launched to raise funds to replace the statue with a replica in resin.

== See also ==
- Val sans retour
- Tréhorenteuc
- Église Sainte-Onenne
- Saint Onenne

== Bibliography ==
- Calvez, Marcel (2010a). "Druides, fées et chevaliers dans la forêt de Brocéliande : de l'invention de la topographie légendaire de la forêt de Paimpont à ses recompositions contemporaines" [Druids, fairies and knights in the forest of Brocéliande: from the invention of the legendary topography of the forest of Paimpont to its contemporary recompositions] (PDF). Festival international de géographie. Programme scientifique (in French).
- Calvez, Marcel (2010b). "Tréhorenteuc, nouveau centre de la topographie légendaire arthurienne, et l'abbé Henri Gillard" [Tréhorenteuc, new center of Arthurian legendary topography, and Abbot Henri Gillard]. Colloque international "Territoire, économie, patrimoine" (in French). Saint-Brieuc.
- Ealet, Jacky (2008). Les oiseaux de papier (ed.). Tréhorenteuc en Brocéliande [Tréhorenteuc in Brocéliande] (in French). ISBN 978-2-916359-28-1.
- Fairbairn, Neil; Cyprien, Michael (1983). A Traveller's Guide to the Kingdoms of Arthur. London: Evans Brothers. ISBN 9780237456566.
- Gillard, Henri (1971). St. Joachim (ed.). Vérités et légendes de Tréhorenteuc [Truths and legends about Tréhorenteuc] (in French). VerLeg1971.
- Guilloux, Yves (2004). Le triskell et l'écharpe: la transceltique d'un maire breton (in French). Coudray-Macouard: Cheminements. ISBN 9782844782519.
- Lacy, Norris J. (1996). "Tréhorenteuc". In Lacy, Norris J. (ed.). The New Arthurian Encyclopedia. New York: Garland. ISBN 9781568654324.
- Papieau, Isabelle (2014). Éditions L'Harmattan (ed.). Le retour de la celtitude : de Brocéliande aux fées stars [The return of Celtitude: from Broceliande to fairy stars] (in French). ISBN 2226228586.
- Quintrec, Charles (1987). "17 juin" [June 17]. In Michel, Albin (ed.). Les Lumières du soir : Journal 1980-1985 [Evening Lights: Diary 1980-1985] (in French). ISBN 2226228586.
