= Saint Onenne =

Breton saint

Onenne
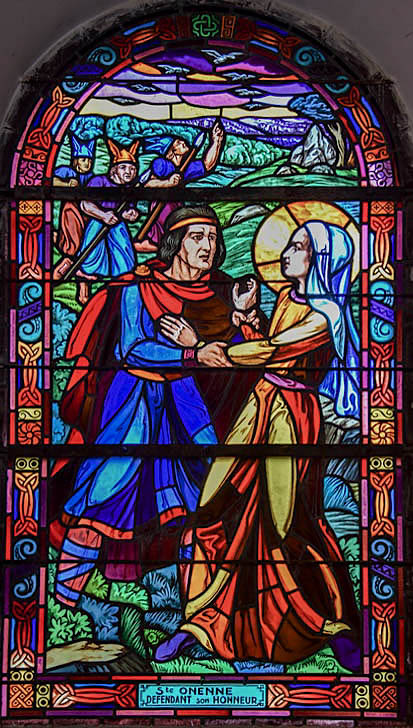
- Saint Onenne defending her honor, stained glass of the Saint-Eutrope Saint-Onenne church, Tréhorenteuc, Morbihan.
- Born: 604
- Died: 630

Saint Onenne is a local Breton saint whose cult exists only in Tréhorenteuc. The church of the municipality partly bears her name. Initially associated with the image of a "Celtic saint," her cult has been linked to symbols of the swan-maiden or the bird goddess close to the goddess Ana, hence her connection with ducks and geese, birds that have retained an important place in her hagiography. Although she is said to have lived in the 7th century, her first written mention dates back to the 11th century. Over time, the removal of original elements brings her cult closer to that of the Virgin Mary associated with grace and purity.

Her hagiography, detailed and transcribed from the 18th to the 20th century, suggests that she is the youngest of the sisters of Saint Judicaël. She vows poverty and leads a humble and pious life as a goose keeper, receiving favors from the Virgin and escaping a rape attempt thanks to the protection of these birds. Saint Onenne is not known for performing miracles, but this figure of humility gains some popularity, attracting many pilgrims to Tréhorenteuc in the 19th century. She was originally celebrated twice a year, on April 30 and October 1. Abbé Henri Gillard is also responsible for a procession, which has not always been followed. With the help of the Association for the Preservation of his Works and under the impetus of Abbé Jérôme Lebel, since 2018, a procession has resumed between the church and the Saint Onenne fountain preceded by geese on September 29th.

== Etymology ==
Saint Onenne is a Christianized Celtic figure. She is also known by the names Onenna, Onenn, Onène, and Ouenne. Philippe Walter connects her name, with the ending "ene/ane," to that of the great goddess Ana (or Dana) and the duck (ane or ene, in Old French), recalling her connection with geese. Due to her highly localized cult, she is also known as "Saint Onenne of Tréhorenteuc." In Breton, she is called Onenn, and Onennus in Latin. Jean Markale, whose ideas have since been widely contradicted in the academic world, linked her original Celtic name to that of the "ash tree".

== Origins and Mentions ==
The hagiography of Saint Onenne is clearly of Celtic origin. According to Philippe Walter, she constitutes the most interesting case of a "Celtic saint". He relates her to the myth of the inviolability of the divine virgin and other saints related to birds and water, two themes very present in Celtic mythology, which are also found, for example, in the legend of the fairy Viviane. Bernard Robreau sees her as one of the rare emanations of the Celtic myth of the swan-woman in Brittany. This myth features women of royal origin who, threatened with rape, transform into a bird (duck, goose, or swan) to save their virginity. All are to be related to the goddess Ana, the symbolism of water, and the cult of springs. He notes that geese have always been associated with Onenne. The clergy preserved this trace of her original identity by transforming her into a goose keeper, and then linking her to the cult of the Virgin Mary.

The oldest known mention of Saint Onenne dates back to the 11th century and appears in the Briocense Chronicle, which gives the names of Judicaël's nineteen brothers and sisters, without dwelling on their hagiography or sanctity. The same is true in the Vita Winnoc, in the following century. Onenne's saintly character, however, is recognized by the historian and hagiographer Pierre Le Baud, who mentions "Saint Onenne" in 1538. Albert the Great cites her in 1637 in his "Lives of the Saints," among the children of Judhaël and Pritelle, under the name "Ouenne".

== Hagiography ==
The hagiographical data concerning Saint Onenne come from two sources: the Christian oral tradition of Tréhorenteuc collected at the end of the 19th century, and a lost manuscript dating from the 18th century, which served as a source for Sigismond Ropartz. In 1943, Abbé Gillard synthesized these two sources and included new elements.

=== Onenne defended by the geese ===
This legend is the oldest. It comes from an 18th-century manuscript transcribed by Abbé Piederrière, rector of Saint-Léry, in 1863.

It presents Onenne as the sister of Saint Judicaël and Saint Urielle, daughter of Judaël, king of Domnonée, and Pritelle. She was born in Gaël and at the age of ten, left the royal castle unbeknownst to her parents. On her way, she exchanged her princess's clothes for those of a pauperess from the Breton moorland, so as not to be recognized. Upon arriving near Tréhorenteuc, she settled in ruins near a fountain and made it her hermitage.

=== Onenne embraced by the Virgin ===
This version comes from an oral tale collected by Adolphe Orain. According to the Encyclopedia of Brocéliande, it is more Christianized than the previous one. Onenne's devotion to the Virgin becomes the heart of the story, sexual assault and the protective role of geese/ducks disappear: it seems to come from a deliberate intention to link the cult of Saint Onenne to that of the Virgin in the 17th century, when the parish of Tréhorenteuc was placed under the authority of the Abbey of Notre-Dame de Paimpont. Saint Onenne loses all her Celtic character to become a devotee of the Virgin.

According to this oral tradition, Onenne is the daughter of the King of Brittany Hoël III (a legendary king assimilated to Judaël). An hermit reveals to her early on that her life on earth will be short. The princess vows to spend her time deserving Heaven. She runs away from her parents' castle and, on the way, exchanges her clothes for rags. She arrives at the castle of Tréhorenteuc after nightfall and, threatened by wolves, asks for hospitality. The next day, she is hired as a goose keeper. She takes to picking roses in the lady's garden to offer them to the Virgin Mary. The noblewoman, seeking to know the reasons for the disappearance of her flowers, follows Saint Onenne to the church, from where she sees two angels lift this humble child up to a portrait of the Virgin, from whom she receives a kiss. The lady finally asks her identity of this pious child, and Onenne eventually returns to her parents' castle. Her parents are very happy to see her again, and she now spends her time helping the country. Still young, she falls seriously ill and dies, sure to join the Virgin in the afterlife.

=== Henri Gillard's Synthesis ===
In June 1943 Abbé Henri Gillard published a Notice on Saint Onenne, synthesizing the two previous sources with some new elements: his version differs from the previous one from the moment Onenne returns to the court of the castle of Gaël. It has the particularity of better anchoring Saint Onenne's life in local toponymy. According to him, Onenne would be the youngest of the 22 children of the royal couple formed by Judaël and Pritelle. Born around the year 604, she leads a simple and pious life, spending a lot of time in prayer and caring for the sick or distributing alms. At the age of 12, she pronounces her vows before Saint Elocan at the hermitage of Saint-Léry. The saint blesses her and assures Pritelle of her daughter's sanctity. Onenne goes to live in Tréhorenteuc in the castle of Mazeries (or the castle of Sainte-Onenne, the manor of La Roche), offering all her possessions to the poor and spending her time in prayer. Around the age of 26, returning from Brambily (near Mauron), she is attacked by a group of young men who kill her companions, one of them trying to abuse her. Onenne defends herself. Wild geese flying in the sky alert a troop of soldiers who come to her rescue. A few months later, Onenne dies from the consequences of her assault (dropsy before the age of thirty or at the age of 30), around 630. Her body is laid to rest in the church of Tréhorenteuc.

== Historicity ==
The legendary nature of Saint Onenne is almost beyond doubt. Philippe Walter considers the saint to be an avatar of the goddess Ana. Jean Markale "never believed for a single second in the historical reality of this Saint Onenne, whose name means 'ash tree' and who is a Christianization of a cult of trees from popular Celtic tradition". He adds that "Abbé Gillard didn't believe in it" either, even though he devoted a significant part of the developments of his new village church to the cult of the saint.

Four centuries pass between the supposed existence of Onenne and her first written mention in the 11th century, as Judicaël's sister, and according to which she has no saintly character. It is possible that a cult dedicated to Onenne existed as early as this period in Tréhorenteuc: linking her to Judicaël both gives her Christian legitimacy and associates her with the Benedictine abbey of Saint-Méen, founded by Judicaël.

== Cult ==
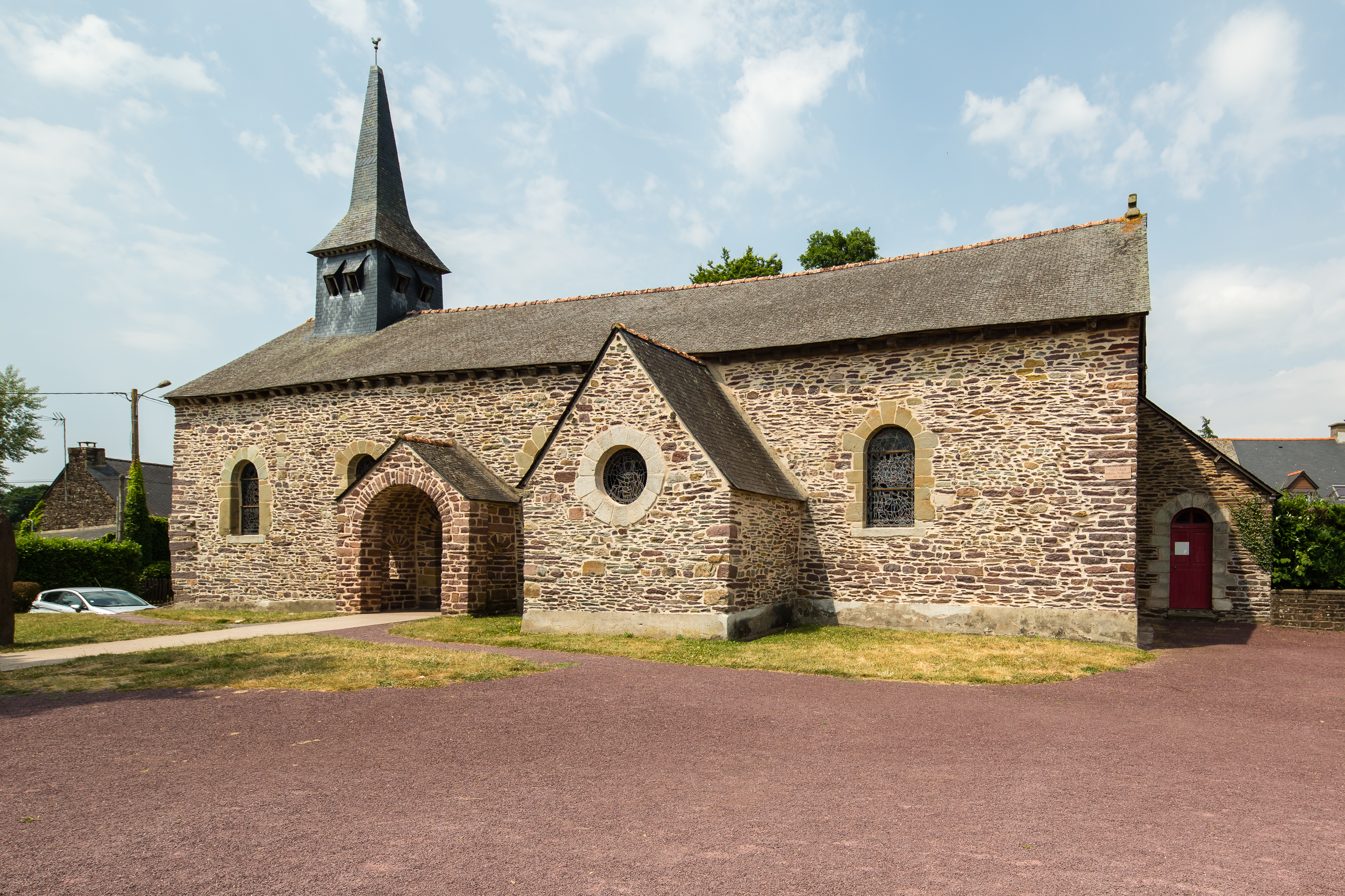
The church of Saint-Eutrope Saint-Onenne.

The cult of Saint Onenne may have originated with the creation of a Christian religious building in Tréhorenteuc in the 7th century, which aimed to compete with a "Druidic center". As such, Onenne is representative of the transitional period when paganism shifted towards Christianity. A tomb was long dedicated to her in the church of Tréhorenteuc, also containing three statues of this saint. Saint Onenne's tomb is said to have attracted many pilgrims to the church in the 19th century, as attested by Sigismond Ropartz, who visited it in 1861. It was moved in 1914 and again in 1927, before being definitively removed in 1943: only a marble plaque in the church reminds that Saint Onenne was buried there. There is no trace left of the original place of worship. The church, which fell into ruins at the beginning of the 20th century, was almost entirely rebuilt and restored by Abbé Henri Gillard after the Second World War.

The cult of Saint Onenne seems to have been deliberately confused with that of Saint Eutrope from the 15th century onwards, hence their celebration on the same day, April 30 (a date mentioned by Canon Garaby in 1839), and the belief that Saint Onenne would cure dropsy (this power is not mentioned in her hagiography). Another celebration date is given in 1836, October 1st, the day on which Saint Onenne's sister Saint Eurielle is also celebrated. From the 17th century, her cult is linked to that of the Virgin Mary. Henri Gillard strengthens this association by moving Saint Onenne's procession to August 15th, the day of the Notre-Dame pardon. No miracles are attributed to Saint Onenne.

=== Saint Onenne Fountain ===
The Saint Onenne fountain near the village of Tréhorenteuc is a deeply entrenched spring, adorned with a niche decorated with a statuette of the Virgin, with a granite cross on top. In the 19th century, processions took place between the church of Tréhorenteuc and this fountain, often with the presence of geese and ducks, but not always: many healing rituals are recorded there, consisting of dropping water on the eyelids of sick children and wetting the shirts of feverish people. Women could hope to be cured of dropsy there, but in fact, it seems that some simply presented themselves as pregnant: the effigy that was in the choir of the church of Tréhorenteuc would have presented a rather round belly. Parishioners also take Saint Onenne's banner to go on procession.

This fountain became the only place of worship for Saint Onenne after 1943. Processions do not take place continuously: Jean Markale reports having witnessed this event on April 5, 1957, with the presence of geese, but the tradition was interrupted before being revived in the 1990s at the initiative of the Association for the Safeguarding of the Works of Abbé Gillard.

=== Sainte-Onenne Castle ===
Onenne is reputed to have settled in a castle in Tréhorenteuc, near the Sainte-Onenne fountain. Popular tradition places the ruins of this castle at a place called Les Mazeries. The first known mention of this castle is in Jean-Baptiste Ogée's dictionary (1780). The supposed ruins of this castle are described in 1843 by Abbé Oresve and then by Sigismond Ropartz, who specifies in 1861 that "everyone will tell you that this is where Sainte Onenne's house was located". Excavations carried out in 1927 concluded that the ruins dated back to the Gallo-Roman era and that the establishment was probably dedicated to metallurgy. Abbé Le Claire believes that these ruins could have been the hermitage of the saint, so on April 18, 1927, a plaque was affixed there with the message "Here was the castle of Sainte Onenne, princess of Brittany, 7th century". Eight days later, the plaque was found attached to the tail of a stray dog in the streets of Tréhorenteuc.

Abbé Gillard links Saint Onenne's castle to the castle of La Roche mentioned in the Lancelot-Grail, which allows him to link Saint Onenne's legend with the quest for the Grail. Another tradition, attested by a single source, names these ruins the "castle of Saint-Bouquet" and asserts that "from his castle, Saint Bouquet could, every morning, greet Saint Onenne who was, for him, a great source of edification. Saint Bouquet cured bites made by rabid dogs".

== Representations ==
The only known representations of Saint Onenne are on six stained glass windows of the Sainte-Eutrope Sainte-Onenne church in Tréhorenteuc, and among the possessions of this same church. A wooden statue depicts her in the choir. On one of the stained glass windows, she exchanges her clothes with a beggar woman. Another stained glass window shows her saved by her geese. A banner, owned by Tréhorenteuc and "classified as an object" in the inventory of historic monuments since June 20, 1929, represents Saint Onenne and Saint Eutrope kneeling near the Virgin and Child, against a background of fleurs-de-lis, with a white goose and three ducklings. Local tradition has it that it was offered by Anne of Brittany, but the object dates from the 17th century. It seems that this banner was offered to Tréhorenteuc with the aim of Christianizing Saint Onenne's procession, by placing it under the patronage of the Virgin. This banner was restored in 1994, at the initiative of the Association for the Safeguarding of the Works of Abbé Gillard.

Saint Onenne is represented in statue at La Vallée des Saints in Carnoët, by the sculptor Seenu.

== See also ==
- Breton mythology

== Bibliography ==
- Ealet, Jacky (2008). "Sainte Onenne, une princesse devenue bergère". Tréhorenteuc en Brocéliande. De Brocéliande à... (in French). Les oiseaux de papier. ISBN 978-2-916359-28-1.
- Markale, Jean (1996). "La fontaine Sainte-Onenne". Guide spirituel de la forêt de Brocéliande. Conscience de la terre (in French). Éditions du Rocher. ISBN 9782268023144.
- Orain, Adolphe (July 1875). Sainte Onenna – récit de la gardeuse de vache (in French). Vol. 10. Revue de Bretagne et de Vendée.
- Ropartz, Sigismond (July 1861). Pèlerinage archéologique au tombeau de sainte Onenne (in French). Vol. 10. Revue de Bretagne et de Vendée.
- Walter, Philippe (2002a). Brocéliande ou le génie du lieu : archéologie, histoire, mythologie, littérature (in French). Presses universitaires de Grenoble. ISBN 978-2-7061-1060-3.
- Walter, Philippe (2002b). Arthur, l'ours et le roi (in French).
