= Église Sainte-Onenne =

- Église Sainte-Eutrope
- Église du Graal
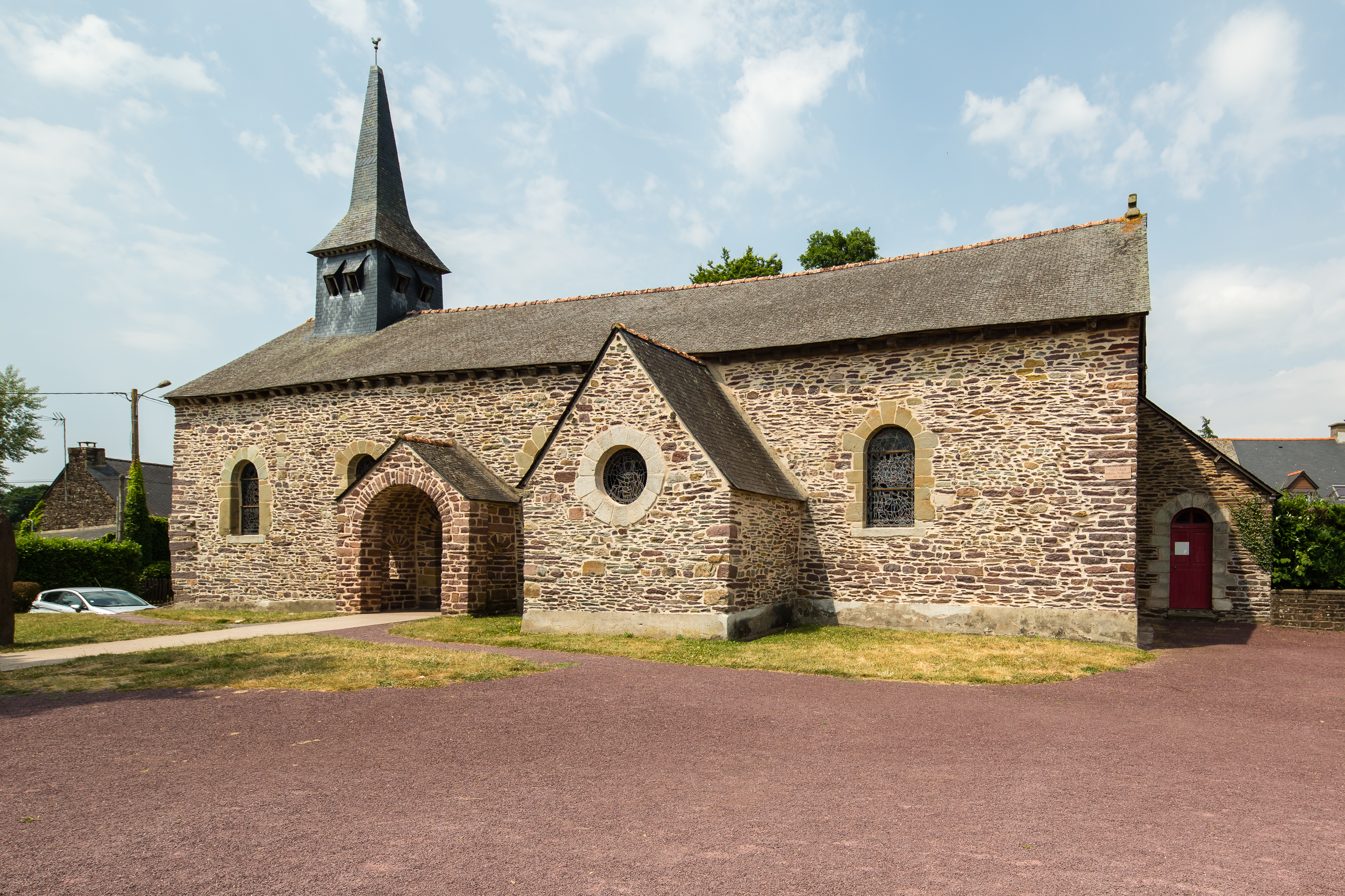
- Église Sainte-Onenne
- 48°00′28″N 2°17′14″W
- Location: Tréhorenteuc, Morbihan, Brittany
- Country: France
- Denomination: Catholic Church

History
- Status: Parish church
- Dedication: St Onenne
- Earlier dedication: St Eutropius of Saintes

Architecture
- Functional status: Active
- Years built: 1516
- Completed: 1962

Administration
- Province: Rennes, Dol and Saint-Malo
- Diocese: Vannes
- Parish: Tréhorenteuc

The Église Sainte-Onenne (St. Onenne's Church), or Église Saint-Eutrope, also known as the Église du Graal (Church of the Grail), is a parish church in the commune of Tréhorenteuc in Brittany. It is the only church dedicated to a local Breton saint, St Onenne. However, it is best known for its fittings and stained glass windows commissioned by the Abbé Gillard between 1942 and 1962 which mix pagan themes from Arthurian legend with Christian elements.

== History ==
Onenne is actually the secondary patroness of Tréhorenteuc, since it was Eutropius, Bishop of Saintes, who was the first saint venerated in this parish. Despite the reputation of “country of miscreants” often attached to this remote region of Brittany, the church has always attracted fervent parishioners.

A Christian religious building seems to have existed in Tréhorenteuc from the 7th century, its purpose then being to compete with a druidic centre. The creation of a priory dependent on the Abbey of Notre Dame de Paimpont (later also a parish church) dates back to 1191.

It attracted the attention of the Duchy of Brittany, and in particular Anne of Brittany, as part of her special measures offering protection against soldiers who indulged in looting: on October 27, 1489, a letter to that effect was sent to Seneschal Allaire. Anne de Bretagne donated a banner representing St Onenne in 1506. The parish building was rebuilt in 1516 by Dom Hamon. Tréhorenteuc was, from 1573, one of the first parishes in the region to keep a burial register.

The French Revolution saw the confiscation of a number of properties belonging to the priory of Tréhorenteuc, including the presbytery used as a school. Similarly, the first mayor, elected on 26 December 1791, had the parish calvary demolished and the church bells sent to the foundry to make cannons, as the government demanded. In 1809 a law abolished worship in Tréhorenteuc, removing it to Néant-sur-Yvel. The parishioners protested because of the remoteness of Néant and the difficulty of getting there in winter on dirt roads. On 26 January 1820 the parish of Tréhorenteuc was reinstated. However, the building was abandoned for more than ten years and fell into ruins. Father Brogard restored it, creating a high altar, and had a floor laid. The church also acquired bells. It nevertheless remained a "country church", as noted by Sigismond Ropartz who visited it in 1861; it was small, low and coated with clay, not very different from a barn. The town not having the means to pay for restoration work, the state of the building deteriorated. Father Alliot, who arrived in 1930, testified to the fact that he "risked his life" there, the gable threatening to collapse.

In March 1942, Henri Gillard, a man of original and nonconformist ideas, was appointed the new rector of the parish, the diocese of Vannes probably wishing to sideline him in "the chamber pot of the diocese". He undertook to restore the church at his own expense, and at the cost of many hardships, completing his task in 1962. The church became not so much a place of worship as a cultural centre, "for lack of inhabitants".

== Artworks ==
The restoration effected by Henri Gillard included the destruction of some works of art he deemed unworthy and the commissioning of many more to replace them. These, which can still be seen today, include two wooden statues of Saints Onenne and Judicaël by the sculptor Edmond Delphaut, a series of stained-glass windows by Henry Uzureau illustrating the life of St Onenne, a series of paintings, altarpieces and other fittings by Karl Rezabeck and Peter Wisdorff (both released German prisoners-of-war), and a mosaic of the white hart of Brocéliande, symbolizing Christ, by Jean Delpech. Many of these artworks depict Arthurian subjects, including the Holy Grail. The Grail appears in the east window with Joseph of Arimathea and Christ, and it manifests itself to King Arthur and his knights in a painting above the sacristy door. Morgan le Fay figures in one of a series of paintings on the Stations of the Cross, notable for setting the story in local Breton scenes. A statue of Gillard himself is stationed outside the church door.

== Gallery ==
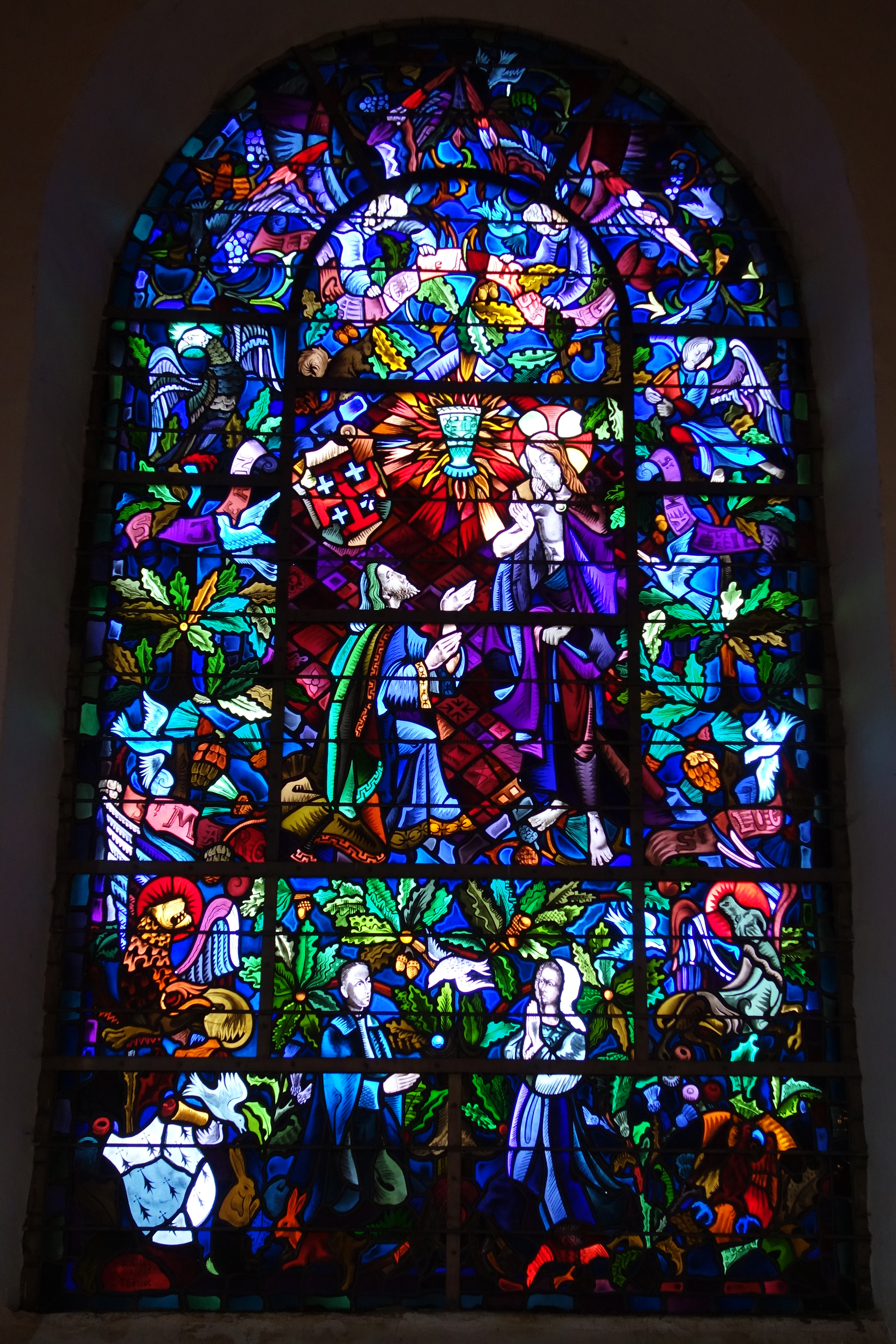
The east window

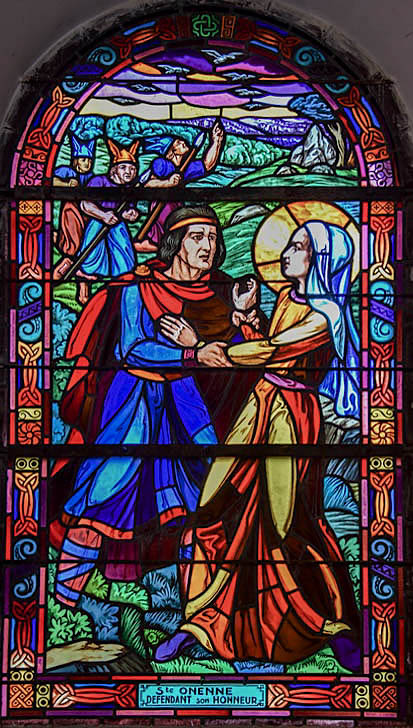
St Onenne window

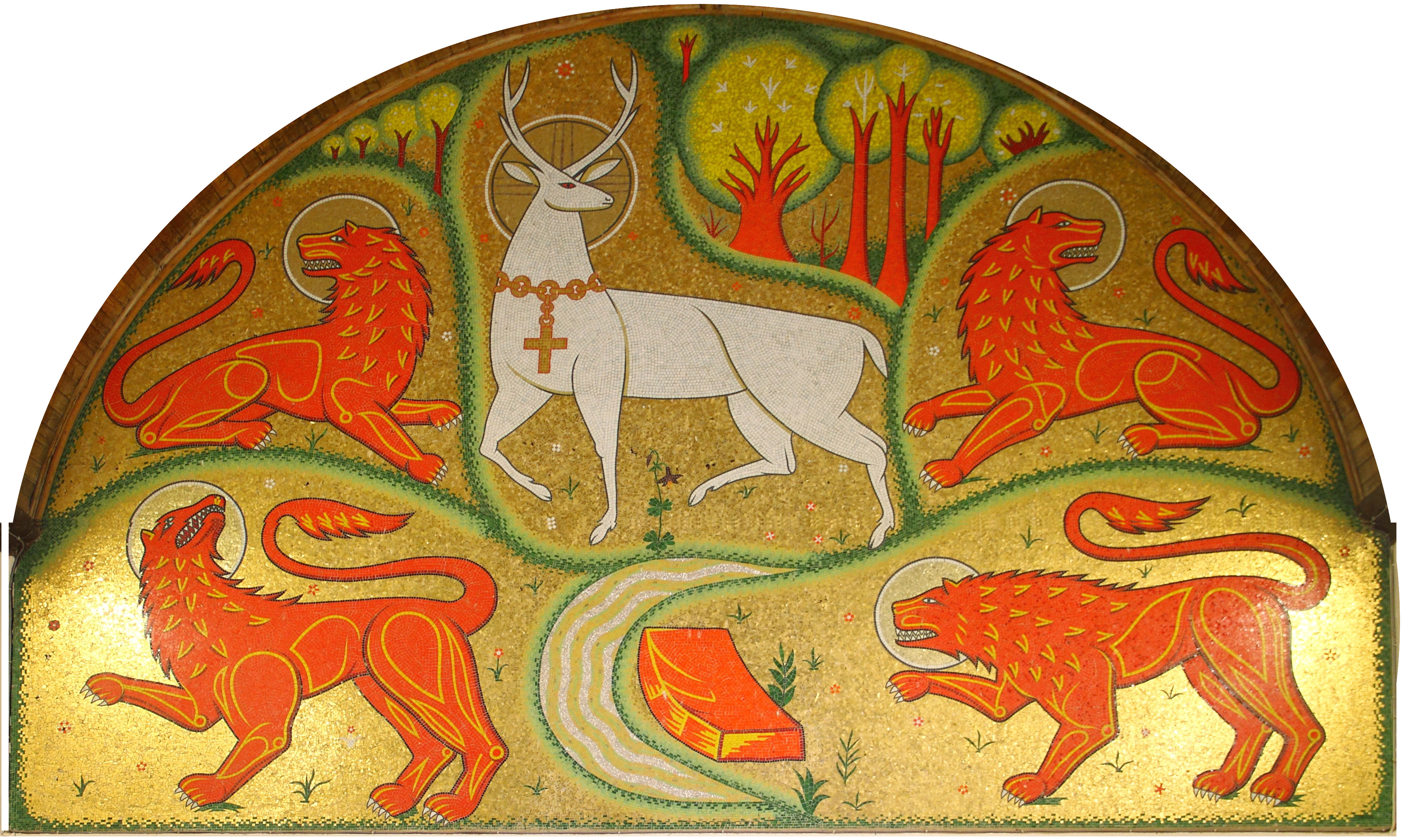
The white hart mosaic

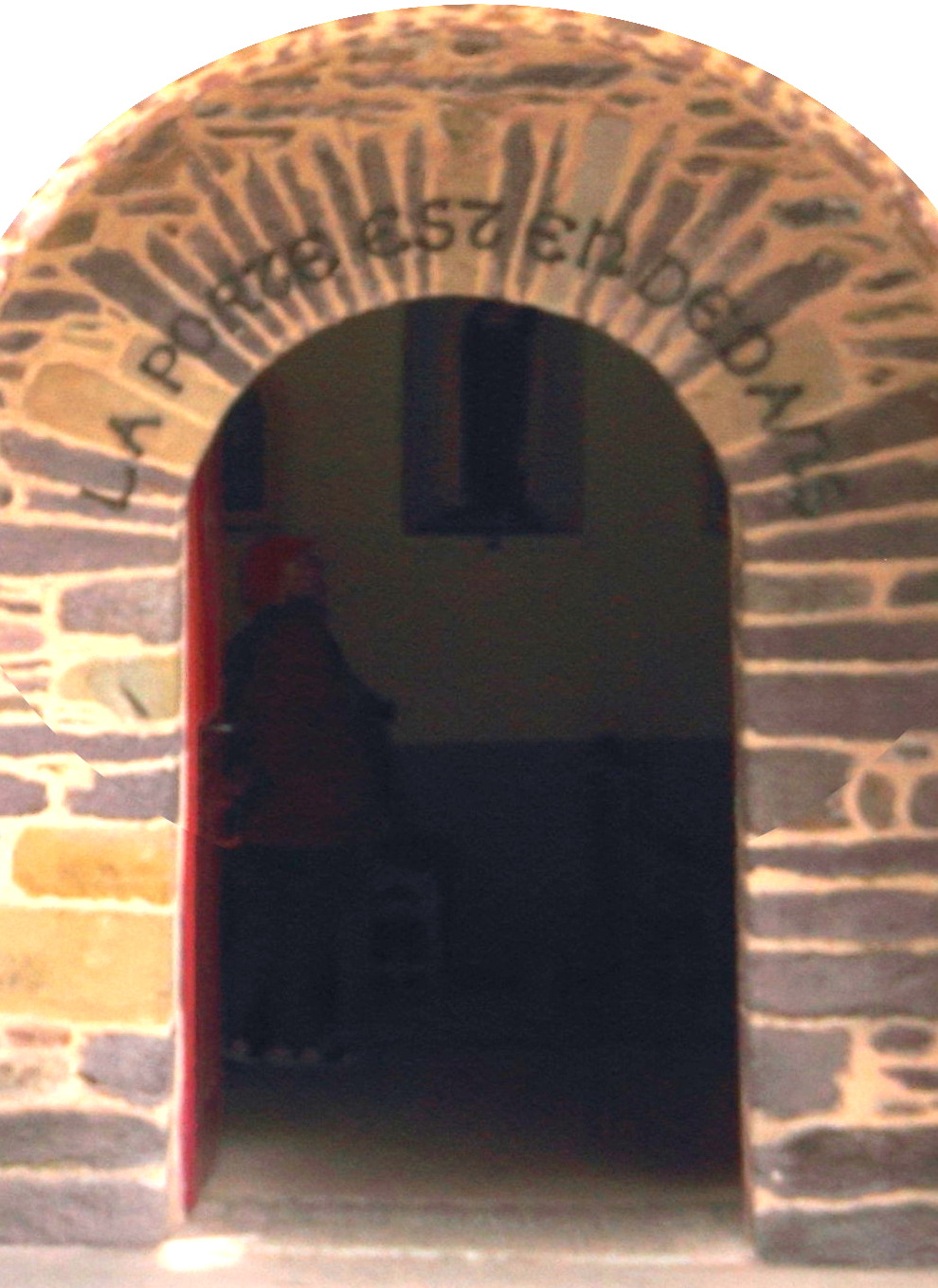
Church door with inscription La porte est en dedans ("The door is within")

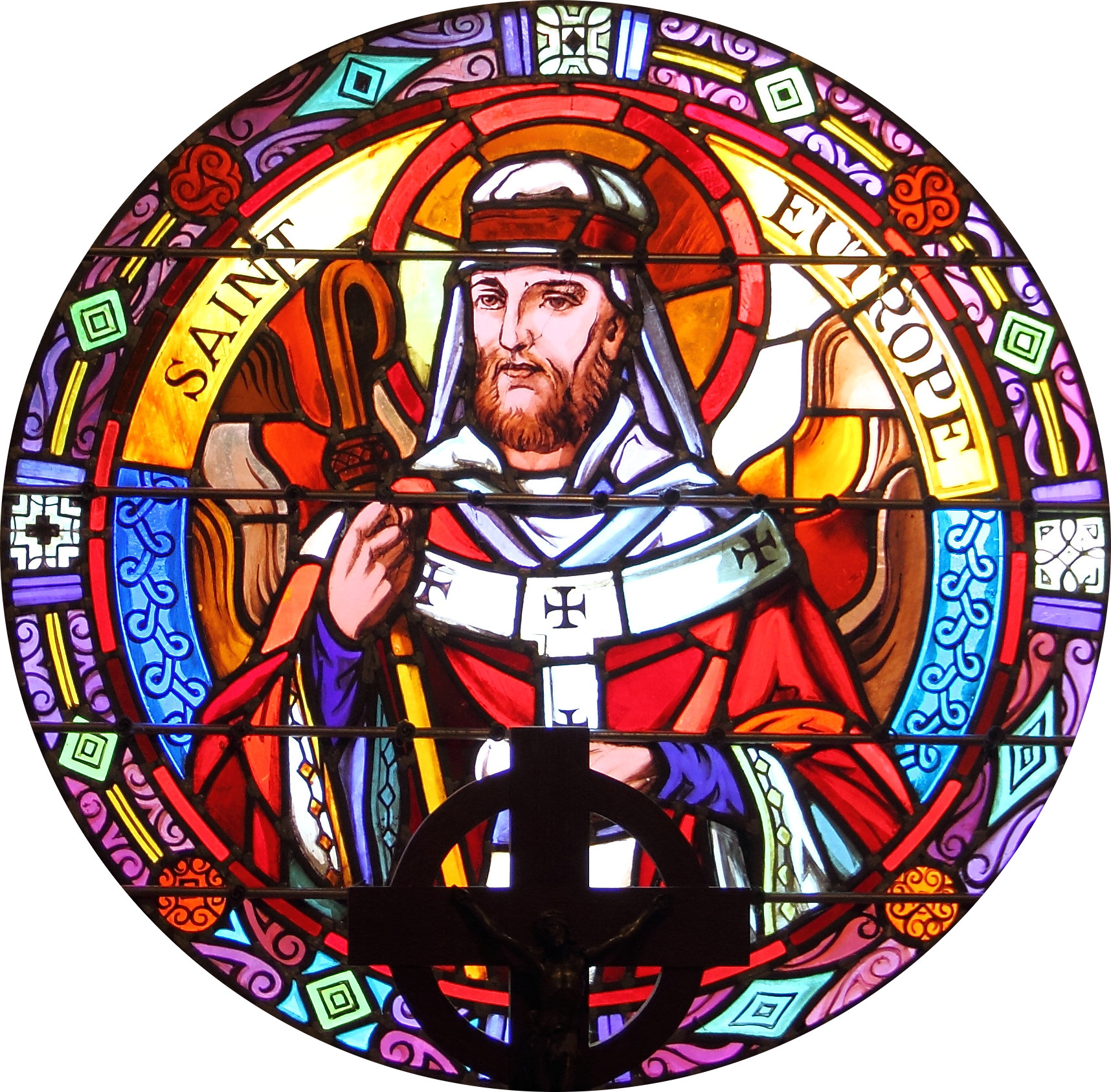
St Eutrope window

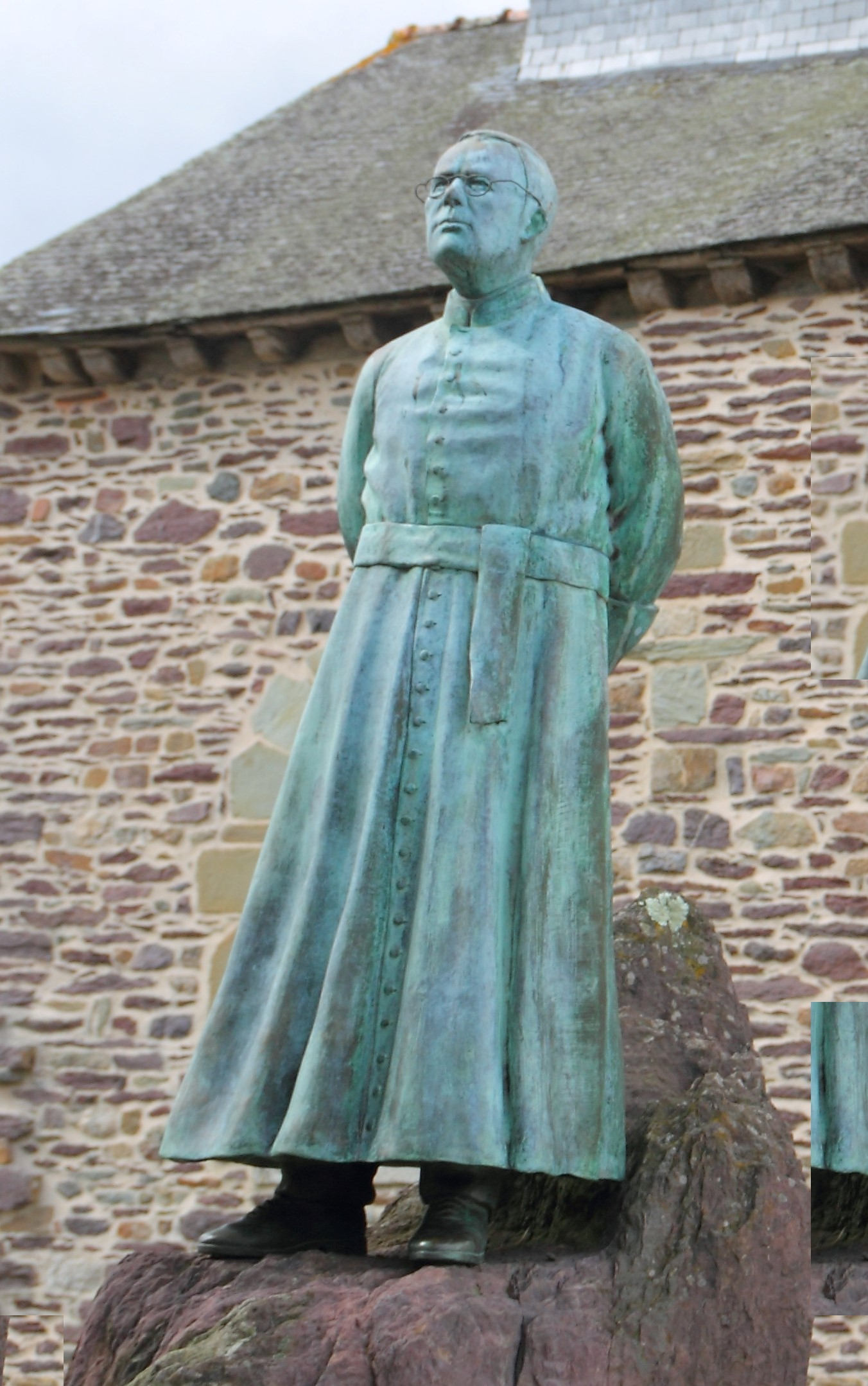
The statue of Henri Gillard

== See also ==
- Saint Onenne
