= Downton Abbey: A New Era (soundtrack) =

Downton Abbey: A New Era (Original Motion Picture Soundtrack)

Soundtrack album by John Lunn
- Released: 29 April 2022
- Recorded: 2021–2022
- Studios: AIR Studios, London
- Genres: Soundtrack album; Film score
- Length: 53:19
- Labels: Decca Gold; Decca; Universal Music
- Producer: John Lunn

John Lunn chronology
Downton Abbey (Original Motion Picture Soundtrack) (2019)	Downton Abbey: A New Era (Original Motion Picture Soundtrack) (2022)	Downton Abbey: The Grand Finale (Original Motion Picture Soundtrack) (2025)

Downton Abbey: A New Era (Original Motion Picture Soundtrack) is the film's soundtrack album and musical score album of the same name, composed by John Lunn and performed by the Chamber Orchestra of London with the voice of Cherise Adams-Burnett featured on two tracks. It was released on 29 April 2022 on CD, digital download and vinyl by Decca Gold, Decca Records and Universal Music.

== Development ==
While composing the film continuation of Downton Abbey in 2019, series regular John Lunn indicated in an interview to Vanity Fair that the film would be the actual conclusion of the series but "the music will definitely live on. Whether there will be another movie, that will probably depend on how successful this one is." However, as the film was a successful venture, the screenwriter Julian Fellowes announced a sequel to the film with Simon Curtis as the director. Lunn also returned from the first film, collaborating with Curtis for the second time after the television series Twenty Thousand Streets Under the Sky (2005). Lunn considered working with Curtis as enjoyable and though he could not meet the director in late-2021 due to COVID restrictions and spend a lot of time.

Compared to the series and film, Lunn employed a bigger orchestra for A New Era enabling a grander soundscape, but the traditional instrumentation, soundscape and setting remained the same. Musically, it also follows the relationships between people as with the television series, with the only change being the scale. In A New Era, the new story and plot lines required music that never had before, with the Crawleys going to the south of France and a film crew hiring Downton Abbey to make a film, serving as a crossover between silent films and talkies, resulted in him creating a newer musical stand. This was also interesting for Lunn, as it was contrary to the previous television series, having a variety of styles in the music within the film, while still sounding like the television series. He noted the last ten minutes of film were musically driven.

As the film needed a new musical flavor, Lunn tried to bring a slightly different orchestra, with the use of celeste, and a harp played differently, and flutes which were never used for the series. He further listened to French music from the early-19th century, and inspired by Claude Debussy, Charles Aznavour and Maurice Ravel's works, Lunn tried to add their influences into the score through the way of orchestration bringing a French flavor but also staying in the same musical world. For the silent film storyline, Lunn spent a massive amount of time on finding the score and the era-appropriate songs as well. Fellowes suggested the use of "Crazy Rhythm" into the script, as well as in other songs, and extensively researched on how silent films sounded musically. Lunn used an acoustic guitar to maintain the rhythm of the film.

== Track listing ==
All music is composed by John Lunn.

No.	Title	Length
1.	"A New Era"	5:22
2.	"Kinema"	1:55
3.	"Côte d'Azur"	3:15
4.	"Guy"	1:47
5.	"All Aboard"	1:41
6.	"The Handsome Mr Barber"	1:56
7.	"Crazy Rhythm"	2:13
8.	"The Gambler"	2:04
9.	"Le Chapeau de Carson"	2:00
10.	"That I Do Remember"	2:33
11.	"First Draft"	1:15
12.	"Am I Blue"	3:18
13.	"Then You're in Luck"	3:09
14.	"Violet mon adorée"	3:26
15.	"Good News, Bad News"	2:07
16.	"The Last Farewell"	3:26
17.	"Cortege"	3:25
18.	"Next Generation"	1:13
19.	"Downton Abbey - The Suite"	7:06
Total length:		53:19

== Reception ==
Jonathan Broxton of Movie Music UK wrote "Downton Abbey: A New Era is a superb score, and anyone who has enjoyed any of the music in the series prior to this will want to add this one to their lists immediately. John Lunn is a master at this sound; lush, emotional, dramatic, and evoking a time and place in English history through stylistic and tonal references to the late-romantic era composers working at the time. The French influences and the Hollywood jazz sounds add new depth to the overall Downton palette, and the way they combine with that terrific main theme, and then rise to an emotional and moving finale, help make this one of the best scores of its type this year."

Filmtracks wrote "Overall, Downton Abbey: A New Era represents a continued maturation of the concept's airy and lovely music with a larger ensemble and more diverse themes, extending its familiar and comforting tones to loftier cinematic reaches." Shannon Connellan of Mashable India wrote "the familiar notes of John Lunn's whimsical theme tornado through the film's overtly cheerful opening montage." David Rooney of The Hollywood Reporter noted that the film is "often accompanied by a jaunty burst of John Lunn's lush orchestral score". Siddhant Adlakha of IGN noted the score to be "glorious".

Rachel Labonte of Screen Rant called it a "sweeping score". Martin Tsai of The A.V. Club noted that Lunn's score "dependably sent chills through Viewers Like You many a Sunday, just the way Alabama 3's "Woke Up This Morning" did to fans of The Sopranos—only this time Downton does so without Laura Linney's intro."

== Personnel ==
Credits adapted from liner notes:

- Music composer, producer, piano, celesta – John Lunn
- Orchestra – Chamber Orchestra of London
- Orchestrator and conductor – Alastair King
- Contractor – Gareth Griffiths
- Concertmistress, violin – Clio Gould
- Choir – RSVP Voices
- Choir conductor – Rob Johnston
- Viola – Ann Beilby
- Sound engineers – Rebecca Hordern, Tom Ashpitel
- Recordist – Jack Mills
- Recording, mixing and mastering – Paul Golding
- Score editor – Janet Grab, Mark Willsher
- Music supervisor – Natalie Hayden
- Executive producer – Gareth Neame
- Score coordinator – Darrell Alexander

== Charts ==
Chart (2022)	Peak position
UK Soundtrack Albums (OCC)	35
