= Val sans retour =

Mythical site from Arthurian legend

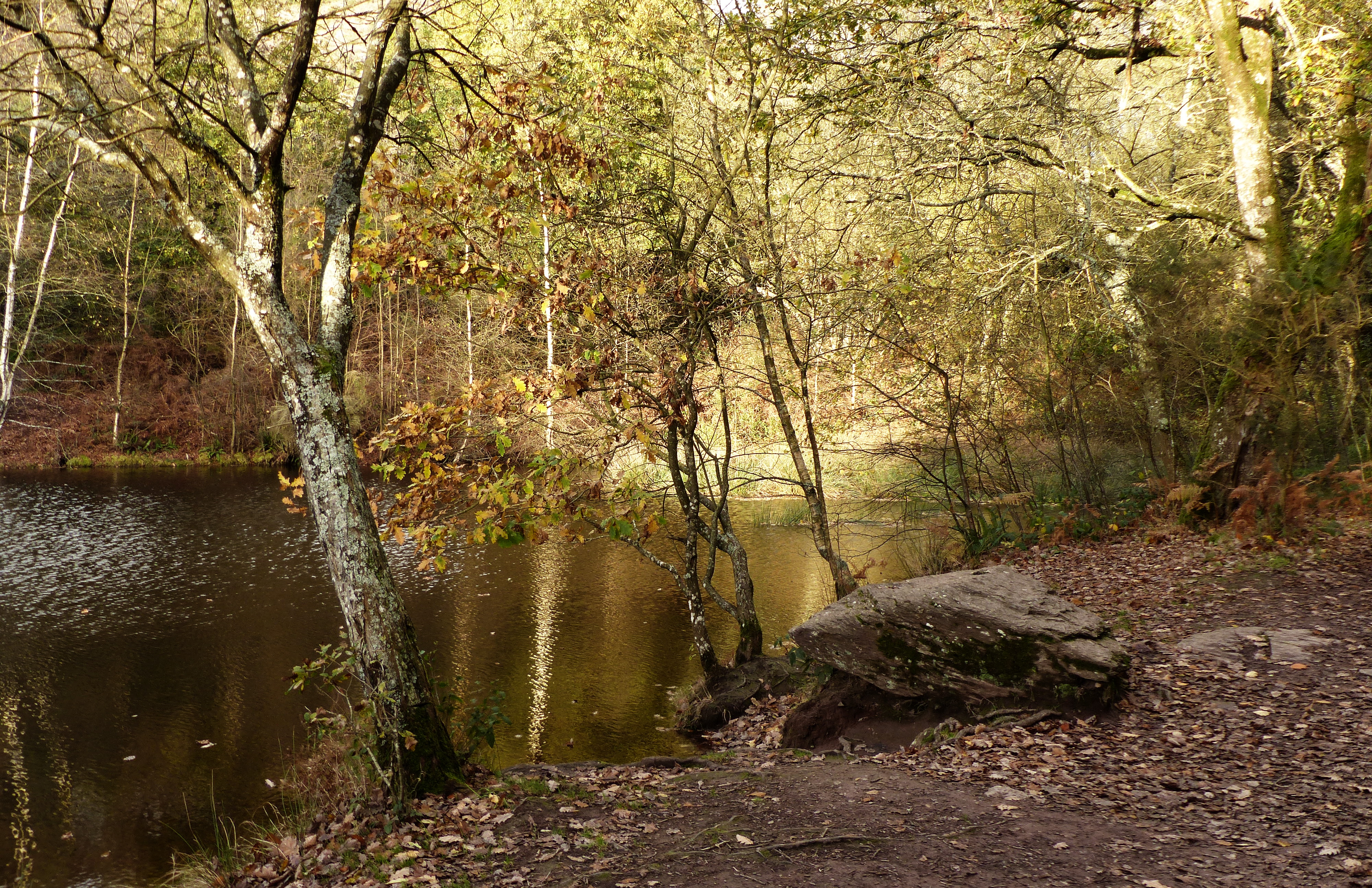
- The Val Sans Retour in the Paimpont forest, behind the Miroir aux fées, in autumn 2017.

- Location within Morbihan
- Interactive map of Val sans retour

Geography
- Location: Tréhorenteuc and Paimpont, Morbihan and Ille-et-Vilaine, France
- Coordinates: 48°00′03″N 2°17′09″W

The Val sans retour (Vale of No Return or Valley Without Return), also known as the Val des faux amants (Vale of False Lovers) or the Val périlleux (Perilous Vale), is a mythical site from Arthurian legend, as well as a physical site located in central Brittany, in the Paimpont forest. The legend attached to it is primarily recounted in the Lancelot-Grail: in it, Morgan le Fay experiences a disappointment in love with the knight Guiomar, and, in retaliation, creates the Val sans retour in the forest of Brocéliande, where any knights unfaithful in love are imprisoned.

The physical site in the Paimpont Forest became a popular tourist site due to its links to Arthurian legends. It has different points of interest including the Golden Tree and the Fairies' Mirror in its valley, as well as Viviane's house and Merlin's seat on its ridges. It is home to numerous species of flora and fauna and protected as a natural zone of ecological interest, fauna and flora, as well as a Natura 2000 site.

== Legend ==
In Arthurian legend, the Val sans retour is an enchanted place created by King Arthur's fairy sister Morgan to imprison knights who are unfaithful to their ladies. It appears most prominently in the Lancelot-Grail cycle, although it is foreshadowed in Chrétien de Troyes' Erec and Enide.

=== In the Lancelot-Grail ===
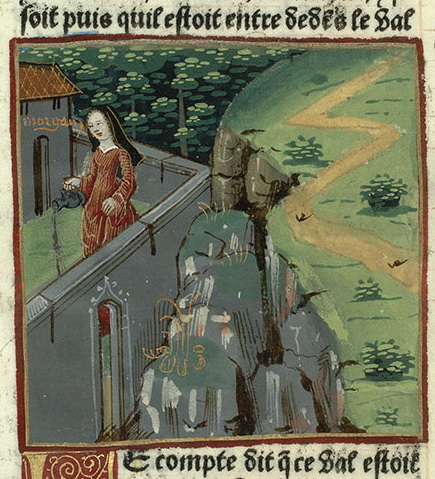
Morgan the fairy (Morgain la fée) enchanting the Val in Lancelot en prose (c. 1494)

In the Lancelot-Grail, a compilation of Arthurian texts from the thirteenth century, the Val sans retour is created by Morgan after a brief love affair with the knight Guiomar (also known as Guyamor, Guyomard, and other variants). Guiomar is convinced by his aunt, Queen Guinevere, to end the affair, provoking a deep hatred from Morgan towards the queen and the Knights of the Round Table. This prompts Morgan to leave Arthur's court and seek out Merlin to learn magic. With her new knowledge of magic, Morgan creates the Val sans retour in the enchanted forest of Brocéliande. She casts a spell that traps any unfaithful lovers (whom she calls "false lovers") in the Val forever.

Morgan specifically creates the Val for Guiomar: upon surprising him in the embrace of another woman, she condemns him to never leave the Val again. This imprisonment is extended to any knight who enters after him who has been unfaithful, in thought or in deed, to his lover. At the entrance of the Val, Morgan places a sign explaining that only a completely faithful lover, capable of overcoming the trials in the Val, will be able to free the knights. These trials include the defeat of two guardian dragons, a wall of fire, and the crossing of a cliff-lined pool. The trial is attempted by many knights.

No one manages to break the enchantment and these men roam the Val, forever lost to the outside world. They remain free to see each other, to talk to each other, to play or to dance because Morgan provides for all their needs. Notable attempts to free the prisoners of the Val include the Duke of Clarence and the knight Yvain, Morgan's own son. The duke overcomes the dragons but is defeated at the pool. Yvain is similarly defeated in the trials and both are imprisoned. Finally, the knight Lancelot hears about the Val. He overcomes the many trials and eventually meets Morgan. It is ultimately Lancelot's absolute loyalty to Guinevere that allows Lancelot to lift the curse of the Val sans retour. In anger at the loss of her enchantment, Morgan traps him by putting a ring on his finger that puts him to sleep, and as such is able to imprison him for a time being.

=== In Erec and Enide ===
Some elements of Chrétien's Erec and Enide, written around 1160-1164, show similarities to the story of the Val sans retour. In particular, towards the end, in the passage entitled La Joie de la Cort (the Joy of the Court) and to honor the promise made to his wife, the knight Maboagrain must remain locked in an enchanted garden and fight all opponents who present themselves until he is defeated. The walls of this garden are bristling with spikes. The intention of the woman is to keep the knight with her forever, though he is eventually defeated by Erec. Similarly to the story of the Val sans retour, the fate of Maboagrain represents a case where a woman reduces the freedom of movement of a knight.

=== Feminist interpretations ===
The episode of the Val sans retour represents within Arthurian literature a "seizure of power by women" and a "world upside down", according to French scholar of Arthurian literature Laurence Harf-Lancner. The Val was designed by Morgan to punish lovers whose love had become distorted. The women of chivalry novels are usually contained within the walls of a castle, while the knights have agency, the ability to go on adventures and can deceive them. In the Val sans retour, the roles are reversed with the men who imprisoned between invisible walls, punished for their infidelity. They are at the mercy of the fairy Morgan and the women they have deceived. Morgan treats her prisoners with dignity and provides for their needs (none seem to be in distress, and once released, they keep the memory of what they lived. A parallel can be drawn with the Wife of Bath, who ultimately describes in the Canterbury Tales a female-dominated Arthurian kingdom, where the roles are reversed.

According to the analysis of Carolyne Larrington, the Val, as Morgan's own creation, also reflects an important part of the personality of the fairy, in a sense a preemptive form of feminism. Through her power, stemming from her knowledge of magic, she is able through legend to reverse a situation that women would not, in reality, have had the ability to change. As Morgan's most spectacular and provocative magical display, the creation of the Val sans retour interferes in the lives of hundreds of Arthurian knights. It also illustrates the tension present in the relationship between men and women within the society of the time: in literary works, the knight is nothing without the love of a woman, often reduced to the role of an object. However, the expectations of a woman of the time went beyond the simple fact of seeing her husband "dedicate his chivalrous exploits to her".

== Physical site ==
=== Description ===
The Val sans retour is a deep valley located in the Paimpont forest. The entrance to the Val is near the town of Tréhorenteuc, in Morbihan, and the site is inseparable from this village. However, the Val sans retour is officially a part of the territory of the municipality of Paimpont, department of Ille-et-Vilaine. The valley is a natural extension of the Paimpont forest massif. It is surrounded by ridges, cut through with purple schist, a type of rock typical of the region.

The valley as a whole retains the scars of the various fires that affected it throughout the twentieth century, favoured by the prevalence of conifers in the area. The vegetation consists of oaks and pines, with an alternation of rocky moors and wooded areas. The site is also home to a wide variety of birds, primarily passerines.

The Val sans retour is subject to several ecological protections due to the variety and fragility of its flora and fauna. It is covered twice as a "Zone naturelle d'intérêt écologique, faunistique et floristique": once for the stream area, and a second time by the forest of Paimpont. It is also a Natura 2000 site.

=== History ===
The Val sans retour was the first place to claim a link with the sites of Arthurian legend. It was not predisposed to become a popular tourist site due to its position far from any main roads and the town of Paimpont. For the majority of its history, the Val sans retour served as a location for both metallurgical and agricultural activity. Specifically, it was used as a pasture for domestic animals and as a supply of animal bedding.

==== 19th century (Celtic Revival) ====
During the Celtic Revival of the 19th century, claims of Aurthurian sites in Brittany began to gain traction. In his 1811 poem La table ronde (The Round Table), Auguste Creuzé de Lesser situated the Brocéliande forest in Brittany, near Quintin. Ludovic Chapplain, a founding member of the Lycée Armoricain, argued for the location of the legendary Val in Brittany in the 1823 article À Monsieur l'éditeur du Lycée Armoricain (To the editor of the Lycée Armoricain).

In 1812, amateur archaeologist Jean-Côme-Damien Poignant and poetry enthusiast François-Gabriel-Ursin Blanchard de la Musse associated the exploits recounted by this poem, La table ronde, with the Marette Valley, located to the east of the Paimpont forest massif. Notably, they placed the "pavilion" of the fairy Morgan that the Lancelot-Graal located in the Valley of No Return in the Château de Comper. By 1850, the location of the Val sans retour had been moved slightly to the west due to the establishment of a metallurgy building from the Paimpont forges, which distorted the legendary character of the Marette valley by contradicting the image of unspoiled nature. The importance of the landscape became paramount in the selection of a substitute location: the Rauco valley, near Tréhorenteuc, where it remains to this day. Félix Bellamy definitively confirmed this new location in the 1890s.

==== Early 20th century (Father Gillard) ====
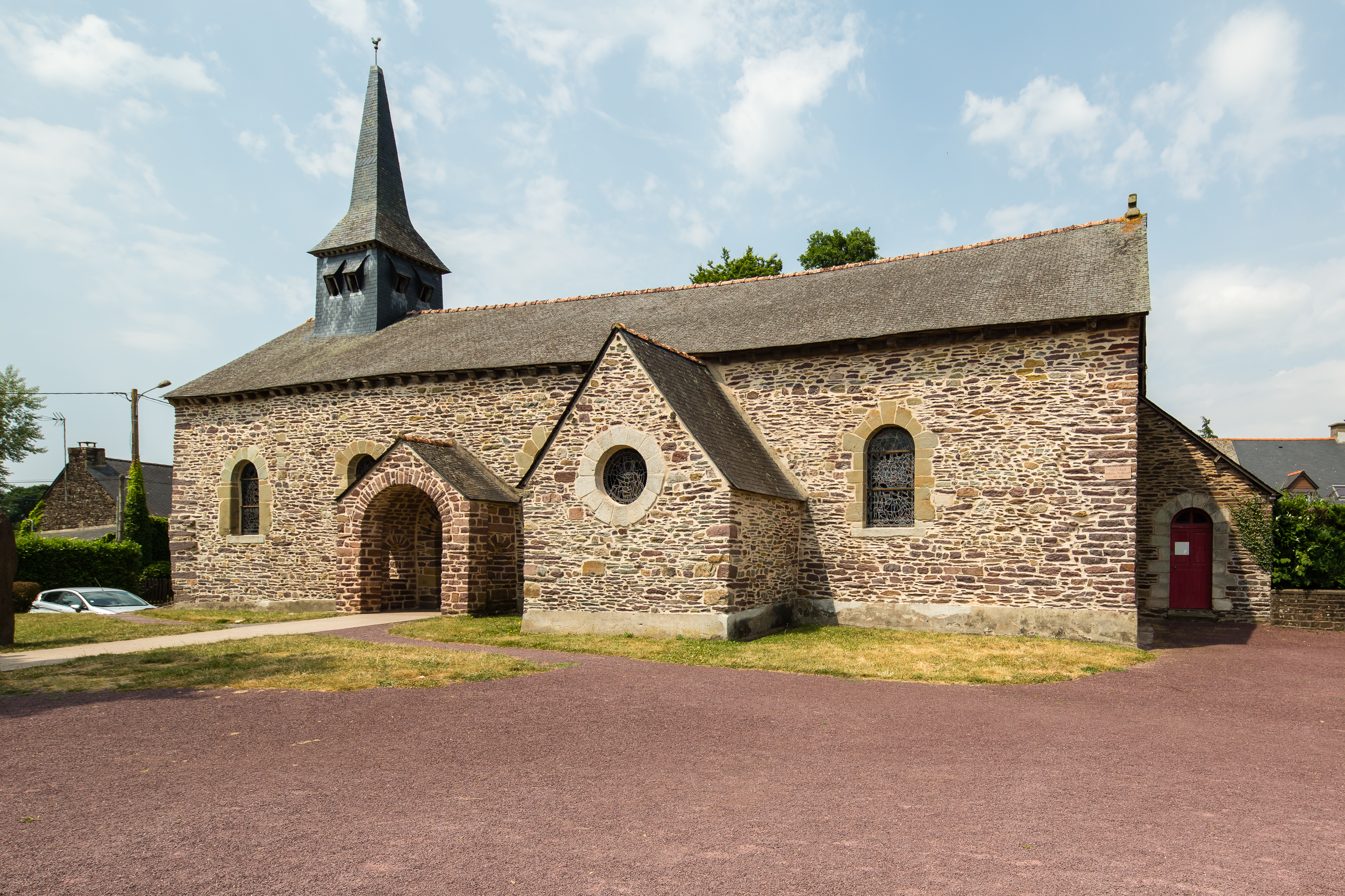
The Church of Saint Onenne in Tréhorenteuc, starting point for visits to the Valley of No Return from 1945 to 1963

Appointed rector of Tréhorenteuc in 1942, Father Henri Gillard recognised the potential for the Christianisation of Arthurian legends to re-invigorate local faith. He personally funded a 12-year restoration of the church of Saint Onenne, imbuing Arthurian legend into the traditional Christian decoration. Notably, his refurbished Stations of the Cross featured, in the ninth station, the third fall of Jesus set in the Val sans retour.

The church became the meeting point for visitors wanting to learn about the legends of the Paimpont forest, rapidly increasing the number of tourists to the Val sans retour. Following this, the International Arthurian Society officially recognised the site at its fourth congress, in Rennes in 1954.

==== Late 20th century (site development) ====
Whilst local inhabitants did not consider the development of the site a priority, various developments nonetheless began emerging in favour of tourism: from 1971 to 1972, clearing of brush, repair of roads and consolidation took place in the Val. Towards the end of the 20th century, the department of Morbihan created its own tourist facilities in order to dissociate the Val from that of the church of Tréhorenteuc, and renamed the east of the department "Pays de la Table ronde" (Country of the Round Table). In 1972, the mayor of Paimpont created the "Tourist Office of Brocéliande", with the stated goal of managing tourism in the Paimpont Forest (including the Val sans retour).

With the abandonment of agricultural use of the site, brush clearing came to an end and, as a result, fires regularly ravaged the Val sans retour from 1959 to 1990. In the two years following the 1990 fire, which destroyed over 400 hectares of moors, volunteers contributed to regeneration of the area by planting thousands of trees in the Paimpont forest as a whole and an art installation in the form of a golden tree was created for the Val by artist François Davin in commemoration of the loss of trees in the area.

=== Tourism ===
The associations of the site with the mystical and otherworldly are heavily exploited by the tourism industry in the area. Several sites of touristic interest are located within the Val:

- Le Miroir aux fées (The Fairies' Mirror) is a lake located at the entrance to the Val that was previously the source for a water mill. It is associated with a local legend that claims it was inhabited by seven fairy sisters, who can purportedly be seen by looking into the lake.
- L'Arbre d'Or (The Tree of Gold) is an art installation depicting a golden tree surrounded by five burnt trees. It is an art installation created by François Davin in 1991 as a commemoration for the 1990 fire that caused immense destruction to vegetation in the area.
- Le rocher des Faux-Amants (False-Lovers' Rock) consists of two interlocking rocks overlooking the Val that are said to resemble the figures of two lovers embracing. These rocks are tied to the legend of the Val: they are said to be the figures of the knight Guiomar and his lover, turned to stone by a jealous Morgan when she discovered them together on the crest of the valley.

The Val is also popular with followers of neo-druidism, who make regular pilgrimages to the site.
