= Downton Abbey (soundtrack) =

Downton Abbey (Original Motion Picture Soundtrack)

Soundtrack album by John Lunn
- Released: 13 September 2019
- Recorded: 2019
- Venue: London
- Studio: Abbey Road Studios; AIR Studios
- Genre: Soundtrack album; Film score
- Length: 53:07
- Label: Decca Gold; Decca; Universal Music Canada
- Producer: John Lunn

Downton Abbey soundtracks chronology
Downton Abbey: The Ultimate Collection (2016)	Downton Abbey (Original Motion Picture Soundtrack) (2019)	Downton Abbey: A New Era (Original Motion Picture Soundtrack) (2022)

Downton Abbey (Original Motion Picture Soundtrack) is the film's soundtrack album and musical score album of the same name, composed by John Lunn, conducted and orchestrated by Alastair King, edited by Mark Willsher and performed by The Chamber Orchestra of London with additional music composed by Chris Egan and prepared by Tristan Noon, while the music for the film's trailer was composed by David James Rosen. It was released on 13 September 2019 on CD, digital download and vinyl by Decca Gold, Decca Records and Universal Music Canada.

== Development ==
John Lunn who composed the original music for the television series Downtown Abbey (2010–2015) returned to score the film, with the director Michael Engler and screenwriter Julian Fellowes also returning. The original theme song from the series, also featured in the film in the opening credits that utilizes strings beneath a simplistic piano, as "it was clear to the directors and producers that the music was as much a part of the show as the cast". While some of the television show's themes were featured in the film, Lunn also created new music. He noted that the film's first cue was featured in the first five minutes of the film, serving as "almost like a compendium of tunes from Downton." The score also accompanied traditional orchestra and instrumentation evoking the 1920s British setting, as shown in the series, but Lunn added that "It's never really about the place or the time [...] It's much more about what's going on inside people's heads or how they're feeling or how they're reacting to other people or the relationships between them."

Lunn, however, employed a rich tradition of string orchestra that emerged across Europe in the late-19th and early-20th century sounds, as well as taking inspiration from composers such as Edward Elgar, Arnold Bax, Gustav Holst and Ralph Vaughan Williams. While openly acknowledging the distinctive English repertoire in his music, the string sound was also a harmonic language akin to the pop and jazz, to which Lunn admitted that the music was a proclamation of 1920s England in an accent of the early 2000s. He noted a challenging moment in the climatic sequence, where he had to enhance the drama without letting the music overwhelm, as "because on one hand, everyone wants it to be elevated, and wants the audience to be emotional about it" but also had to be careful that the music did not dominate and overpower the performances, allowing in a more subtle manner.

== Reception ==
Jonathan Broxton of Movie Music UK wrote "Put on your morning suit, pour yourself a cup of tea or a large brandy, break out the cucumber sandwiches, and let the nostalgic sounds of post-Edwardian England wash over you." Richard Lawson of Vanity Fair wrote "John Lunn's lush score is an invaluable part". Kenneth Turan of Los Angeles Times wrote "it is only now, when we hear John Lunn's unmistakable opening music kicking in, that we know we are safely home."

Kimberley Jones of The Austin Chronicle wrote "composer John Lunn's jaunty, carryover music cues are there to nudge you in the right direction". Eleanor Bley Griffiths of Radio Times called the score "rousing". David Griffin of IGN India wrote the film is "accompanied by long-time Downton composer John Lunn, whose melodious tunes evoke a feeling of grandeur that's appropriate for a film about royalty". Marley Marius of Vogue called it a "string-heavy score". Brian Lowry of CNN wrote "John Lunn's lush score swells in accompaniment".

Critics further noted the use of the series' opening theme in the opening credits, which evoked nostalgic moments, despite the film's mixed response. (Note: Attributed to multiple references:)

== Track listing ==
All music is composed by John Lunn.

No.	Title	Length
1.	"A Royal Command"	4:49
2.	"Pillar of the Establishment"	1:48
3.	"Gleam and Sparkle"	2:48
4.	"God Is a Monarchist"	3:02
5.	"Two Households"	5:00
6.	"Incident at a Parade"	2:57
7.	"Sabotage"	3:33
8.	"Maud"	1:28
9.	"Honour Restored"	2:39
10.	"Never Seen Anything Like It"	2:27
11.	"Not Entirely a Bad Night"	2:59
12.	"May I?"	3:08
13.	"Taking Leave"	2:26
14.	"Resolution"	2:15
15.	"You Are the Best of Me"	2:44
16.	"Sunset Waltz"	3:51
17.	"One Hundred Years of Downton"	5:13
Total length:		53:07

== Personnel ==
Credits adapted from liner notes:

- Music composer and producer – John Lunn
- Performer – Chamber Orchestra of London
- Orchestrator and conductor – Alastair King
- Musicians' contractor – Gareth Griffiths
- Recording, mixing and mastering – Paul Golding
- Music editor – Mark Willsher
- Score recordist engineer – Adam Miller, Chris Parker
- Score coordinator – Darrell Alexander
- Music librarian – Simon Whiteside
- Executive producer – Gareth Neame
- Product manager for Decca Records – Lana Hunter
- Product coordinator for Decca Records – Nico Rooney
- Production coordinator for Decca Records – Alexandra O'Hara
- Soundtrack coordination for Focus Features – Andy Kalyvas, Nikki Walsh
- Executive in charge of music for Focus Features – Mike Knobloch
- Music business and legal affairs for Focus Features – Tanya Perara, Sarah Hallbauer
- Music supervision for Focus Features – Natalie Hayden

== Charts ==
Chart (2019)	Peak position
UK Soundtrack Albums (OCC)	20
