= Downton Abbey: The Ultimate Collection =

Soundtrack album by John Lunn and Chamber Orchestra of London
- Released: 15 January 2016
- Recorded: 2010–2015
- Studios: Abbey Road Studios; Angel Recording Studios; AIR Studios
- Length: 109:29
- Label: Decca
- Producer: John Lunn

Downton Abbey: The Ultimate Collection is the third and final soundtrack that accompanied the ITV historical television series Downton Abbey. Composed by John Lunn and performed by the Chamber Orchestra of London, the album consisted of 23 songs, mostly from the television score and three songs performed by Mary-Jess Leaverland and Eurielle. It was released on 15 January 2016 through Decca Records.

== Background ==
The Ultimate Collection comprises the musical score for all the six seasons from the series, composed by Lunn and performed by the Chamber Orchestra of London under the supervision of conductor Alastair King. It featured the suite and "Did I Make the Most of Loving You?" performed by Mary-Jess Leaverland, that featured in the first two soundtracks, along with a cover of "I'll Count The Days" by Eurielle (originally performed by Rebecca Ferguson). It was released as a double album of 36 tracks—the first disc had 17 tracks and the second one had 19 tracks—on 4 December 2015 through physical formats. In digital streaming platforms, the album was released as a single standalone album on 15 January 2016.

== Track listing ==
Downton Abbey: The Ultimate Collection – Disc 1
No.	Title	Artist	Length
1.	"Downton Abbey: The Suite"	John Lunn; Chamber Orchestra of London	7:09
2.	"Story of My Life"	John Lunn; Chamber Orchestra of London	1:58
3.	"Love and the Hunter"	John Lunn; Chamber Orchestra of London	3:17
4.	"Preparation"	John Lunn; Chamber Orchestra of London	3:27
5.	"Such Good Luck"	John Lunn; Chamber Orchestra of London	2:52
6.	"Did I Make the Most of Loving You?"	John Lunn; Chamber Orchestra of London; Mary-Jess Leaverland	4:17
7.	"Damaged"	John Lunn; Chamber Orchestra of London	5:25
8.	"Violet"	John Lunn; Chamber Orchestra of London	1:56
9.	"I'll Count The Days"	John Lunn; Chamber Orchestra of London; Eurielle	2:42
10.	"Fashion"	John Lunn; Chamber Orchestra of London	1:20
11.	"Us and Them"	John Lunn; Chamber Orchestra of London	1:53
12.	"The Fallen"	John Lunn; Chamber Orchestra of London	3:00
13.	"Elopement"	John Lunn; Chamber Orchestra of London	4:44
14.	"New World"	John Lunn; Chamber Orchestra of London	1:51
15.	"A Dangerous Path"	John Lunn; Chamber Orchestra of London	3:12
16.	"Escapades 1"	John Lunn; Chamber Orchestra of London	6:04
17.	"A Glimpse of Happiness"	John Lunn; Chamber Orchestra of London	2:03

Downton Abbey: The Ultimate Collection – Disc 2
No.	Title	Artist	Length
1.	"A Grand Adventure"	John Lunn; Chamber Orchestra of London	3:24
2.	"Duneagle"	John Lunn; Chamber Orchestra of London	2:06
3.	"Not One's Just Desserts"	John Lunn; Chamber Orchestra of London	1:53
4.	"Life After Death"	John Lunn; Chamber Orchestra of London	6:16
5.	"Marmalade Cake Walk"	John Lunn; Chamber Orchestra of London	0:56
6.	"A Mother's Love"	John Lunn; Chamber Orchestra of London	1:46
7.	"The Hunt"	John Lunn; Chamber Orchestra of London	2:10
8.	"Nothing Will Be Easy"	John Lunn; Chamber Orchestra of London; Eurielle	4:20
9.	"Down In China Townton"	John Lunn; Chamber Orchestra of London	1:36
10.	"Escapades 2"	John Lunn; Chamber Orchestra of London	5:35
11.	"Brancaster"	John Lunn; Chamber Orchestra of London	4:22
12.	"Goodbye"	John Lunn; Chamber Orchestra of London	2:36
13.	"It's Not Goodbye It's Au Revoir"	John Lunn; Chamber Orchestra of London	2:24
14.	"The New Gladiators"	John Lunn; Chamber Orchestra of London	4:03
15.	"Modern Love"	John Lunn; Chamber Orchestra of London	2:51
16.	"Ambassador Stomp"	John Lunn; Chamber Orchestra of London	2:10
17.	"The Butler And The Housekeeper"	John Lunn; Chamber Orchestra of London	2:08
18.	"Two Sisters"	John Lunn; Chamber Orchestra of London	2:38
19.	"End Of An Era"	John Lunn; Chamber Orchestra of London	0:52

== Charts ==
Chart (2016)	Peak position
UK Soundtrack Albums (OCC)	7

== Accolades ==
At the 64th and 65th Primetime Creative Arts Emmy Awards, John Lunn won the Primetime Emmy Award for Outstanding Music Composition for a Series (Original Dramatic Score). Lunn received a nomination for the 2012 British Academy Television Craft Awards under the Best Original Music category.

== Personnel ==
Credits adapted from liner notes

- Music composer and producer – John Lunn
- Musical arrangements – Simon Whiteside
- Conductor – Alastair King
- Orchestra – The Chamber Orchestra Of London
- Piano – John Lunn
- Recording and mixing – Paul Golding
- Mastering – Nick Watson
