= Tangier Tattoo =

Tangier Tattoo is an opera by John Lunn (composer) and Steven Plaice (librettist). It was commissioned by and written in 2006 for Glyndebourne Festival Opera as the third part of a trilogy of operas, the others being Misper (1997) and Zoë (2000). The trilogy was part of a Glyndebourne project that aimed to interest young people in opera.

Critical reception by the British national newspapers was mixed. The Times said "If every opera production were like this, the genre would soon shake off its cumbersome geriatric image" and The Independent "the plot is sharp and smart, if initially slow-burning, and Plaice's libretto is promising." However a Guardian critic wrote: "Most worrying of all is the sense that any self-respecting youth audience is going to see through Glyndebourne's attempt to get with the kids as a patronising gesture of trendy inclusivity" and a Telegraph critic referred to it as "derivative drivel" which he said would "will never convert the iPod generation".
