= Saint Urielle =

- Born: 6th or 7th century Armorica
- Venerated in: Breton Christianity (Catholic)
- Major shrine: Church of Sainte-Urielle (now Church of Saint-Pierre)
- Feast: 1 October
- Princess of Armorican Dumnonia
- Father: Hoël III or Judaël
- Mother: Pritelle (Pritella)

Saint Urielle (Breton: Santez Uriell; French: Sainte Urielle; fl. 6th or 7th century), also known as Eurielle, Curielle, or Arielle, was a mythical Christian saint of Armorica venerated in the Celtic Brittany region.

== Tradition ==
Urielle was one of the daughters of Hoël III, legendary king of Armorica, and Pritelle, whom he married around 590. Hoël III was equated to Judaël (also spelled Judhaël; reigned 580–605), Breton king of Armorican Dumnonia and father of Judicael, Judoc, and Winnoc, thus making Urielle a sister of the three saints'. Her sister Onenne is also venerated as a saint. According to Malo-Joseph de Garaby in his Vie des bienheureux et des saints de Bretagne, "the two holy princesses were so detached from all the seduction of vulgar souls, that they constantly labored to gain enough merit to deserve heaven." Urielle is said to be the eldest daughter of Judaël.

== Parish ==
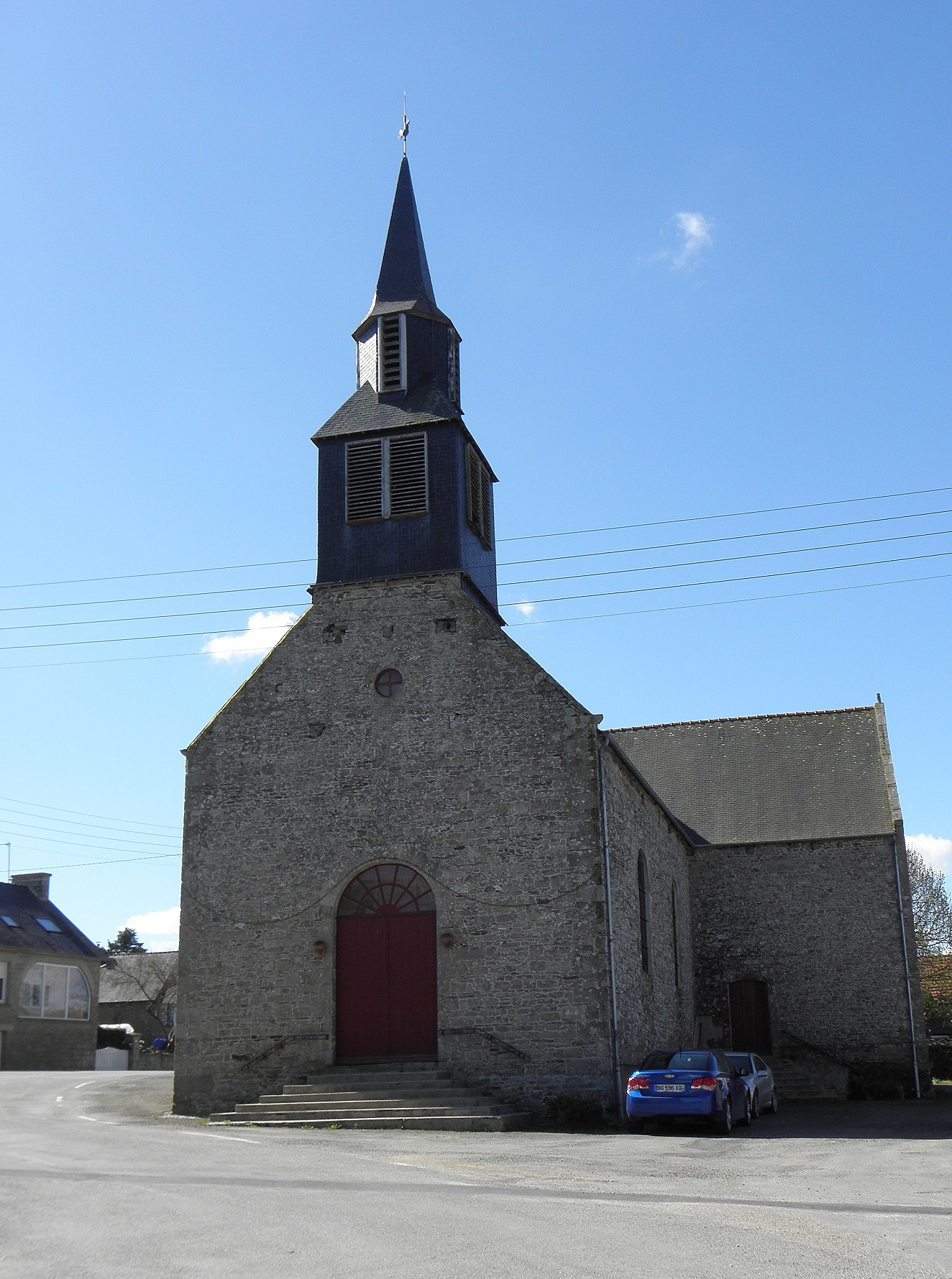
Church of Saint-Pierre, Trédias.

Urielle was patroness of an eponymous parish, which was absorbed into the parish of Trédias on June 23, 1819. A 16th-century polychrome wooden statue of Saint Urielle is kept in the Parish Church of Saint-Pierre.

== See also ==
- Saint Uriel
- List of Breton saints
