= Edmond Delphaut =

French sculptor

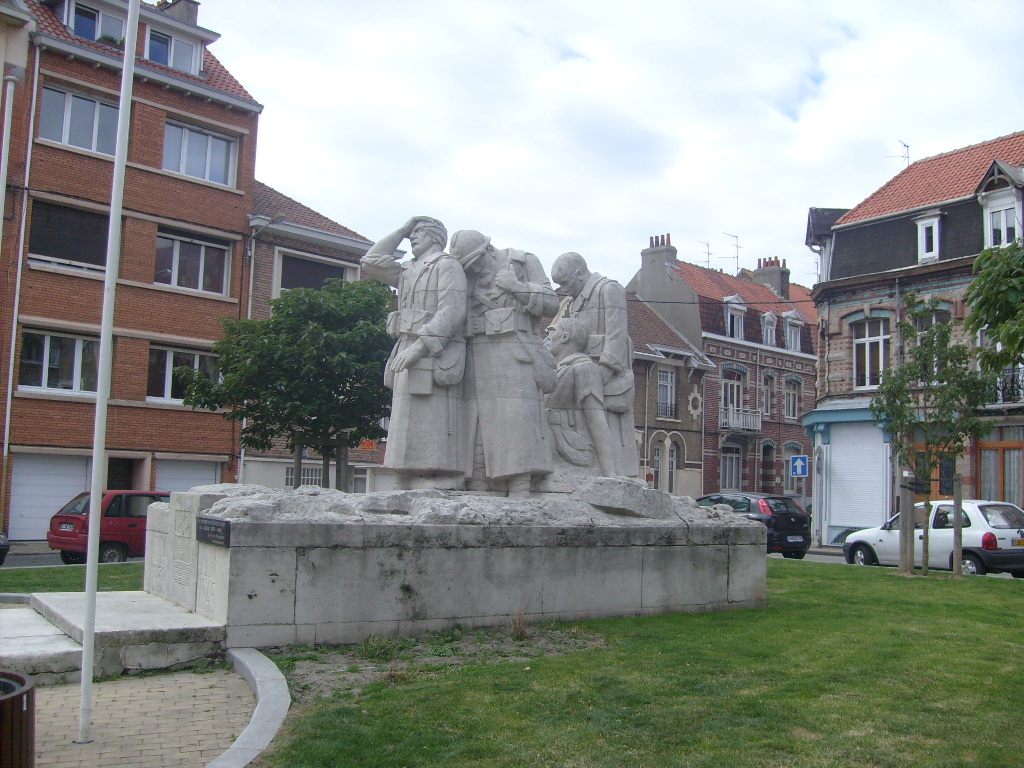
Delphaut's monument aux morts at Malo-les-Bains

Edmond Delphaut (1891 1957) was a French sculptor known for his work on World War I memorials, in particular that at Malo-les-Bains in the Nord department in Northern France.

== Malo-les-Bains ==
Delphaut created a marble sculpture of a line of four injured soldiers for the Malo-les-Bains World War I memorial. Delphaut received the commission for the work in December 1933.

The war memorial (French: monument aux morts), "distinguished by its size, style, originality and sobriety", shows four wounded soldiers who have returned from the front and are heading for a first aid post. The leading soldier has been blinded. His right hand is held to his eyes and his left hand seems to be feeling for a way forward. The second soldier has been gassed and leans his head on the blinded soldier. Behind him the third man appears on the point of collapse and he is supported by the last of the soldiers who is also wounded and is clearly in a state of great shock. This monument stands in the place Delta in Malo-Les-Bains.

The memorial was inaugurated in June 1935.

== Other war memorials ==
According to French Government records, Delphaut was the sculptor of the monuments aux mort listed below. There is however no full record of these monuments and Delphaut's compositions for them other than that at Longuyon which featured an allegorical representation of France holding an orphaned child whilst a dying infantryman lies at her feet.

- 1917 - Memorial in Königsbrück, Saxony in Germany, dedicated to the Serbs who had died whilst in captivity.
- 1922 - The monument aux morts at Longuyon, Meurthe-et-Moselle, France.
- 1922 - The monument aux morts at Charency-Vezin, Meurthe-et-Moselle, France.
- 1924 - The monument aux morts at Montmedy, Meuse, France.
- 1926 - The monument aux morts at Rehon, Meurthe-et-Moselle, France.
- 1931 - The monument aux morts at Baslieux, Meurthe-et-Moselle, France.

== Professional organizations ==
Delphaut was a laureate with the Société des Artistes Français. He participated in the Salon exhibition of 1933.
