= John Lunn =

British composer

John Lunn (born 13 May 1956) is a Scottish composer, known for the music from the series Downton Abbey and for many other television and movie soundtracks.

== Early life and education ==
Lunn was born in May 1956. His father was a saxophonist in a jazz band.

Lunn graduated from Glasgow University, where he studied 12-tone techniques. He has cited among his musical influences John Cage, Milton Babbitt, and György Ligeti, as well as Miles Davis. Lunn was also a member of "systems music" band Man Jumping, an early 1980s "jazz-pop-worldbeat fusion ensemble", where he played bass and keyboard.".

He took a short course in computer music at MIT, and assembled his own computerised compositional system, using Cubase software. He later acquired a Prism Sound ADA-8XR multichannel converter and an Orpheus FireWire interface, accompanying them with external hardware analogue dynamics and EQ units in the form of a Maselec MLA-2 tri-band compressor and a Maselec MEA-2 equaliser.

== Career ==
=== Television ===
He began composing for BBC Scotland in the late 1980s, with Beatrix: The Early Life of Beatrix Potter (1990) and The Gift (1991). His work also includes music for the television series Hamish Macbeth (1995–1997), Lorna Doone (2000), North Square (2000), Madame Bovary (2000), Cambridge Spies (2003), Bleak House (2005), Hotel Babylon (2006), Little Dorrit (2008), Downton Abbey (2010–2015), Waking the Dead (2011), The White Queen (2013), Shetland (2013), Grantchester (2014), The Last Kingdom (2015), and Belgravia (2020).

=== Opera ===
Lunn has written several operas. Two of them, Misper (1997) and Zoë (2000) (shown by Channel 4), were written for Glyndebourne. Another, Mathematics of a Kiss, was written for the English National Opera. He wrote the 2006 operetta Tangier Tattoo, with librettist Stephen Plaice, again for Glyndebourne.

Lunn's violin concerto was premiered by Clio Gould and the London Sinfonietta at the Queen Elizabeth Hall.

=== Albums published ===
- Lunn, John (19 November 2012). Downton Abbey: The Essential Collection. Decca Records. (audio CD)
- Lunn, John (13 December 2011). Downton Abbey: Original Music from the TV Series. Decca Records. (audio CD)

== Awards ==
Lunn has won two Emmy Awards, in 2012 and 2013, both for the Outstanding Music Composition for A Series (Original Dramatic Score), each for an episode of Downton Abbey. He was nominated three other times: Outstanding Music Composition For A Miniseries, Movie Or A Special (Original Dramatic Score) for Little Dorrit in 2009; for Outstanding Music Composition for A Series (Original Dramatic Score), for Downton Abbey, Episode 8 in 2014; and Outstanding Music Composition for a Miniseries, Movie or a Special (Original Dramatic Score) for The White Queen in 2014.

His music for Sky TV's Going Postal was winner of Best TV Score in the 2010 RTS Awards and was nominated for a BAFTA and an Ivor Novello award. The BBC adaptation of Dickens' Little Dorrit was nominated for a BAFTA Award for Outstanding Original Score.
