= Jean Markale =

Jean Markale (May 23, 1928 in Paris – November 23, 2008) was the pen name of Jean Bertrand, a French historian, writer, poet, radio show host, lecturer and high school French teacher who lived in Brittany. As a former specialist in Celtic studies at the Sorbonne, he researched pre-Christian and medieval culture and spirituality. He published numerous books about Celtic civilization, particularly the place of women in Celtic culture, and Arthurian literature.

== Works ==
His many works deal with subjects as varied as summations of various myths, their relationships with subjects like the Templars, the Cathars and the Rennes le Château mystery, Atlantis, the megalith building civilisations, Druidism and the biography of Saint Columba.

- The Celts: Uncovering the Mythic and Historic Origins of Western Culture (ISBN 0-89281-413-6)
- Montségur and the Mystery of the Cathars (ISBN 0-89281-090-4)
- Women of the Celts (1972)
- The Druids: Celtic Priests of Nature (ISBN 0-89281-703-8)
- Cathedral of the Black Madonna: The Druids and the Mysteries of Chartres
- King of the Celts: Arthurian Legends and Celtic Tradition
- Merlin: Priest of Nature
- The Epics of Celtic Ireland: Ancient Tales of Mystery and Magic
- The Great Goddess: Reverence of the Divine Feminine from the Paleolithic to the Present
- The Church of Mary Magdalene: The Sacred Feminine and the Treasure of Rennes-le-Chateau

== Controversy ==
While Markale presents himself as widely read on the subjects about which he writes, the value of his work is controversial. His 'creative' use of scholarship and his tendency to make great leaps in reasoning cause scholars following more normative and conservative methods to balk and his interest in subjects that his critics consider questionable, including various branches of the occult, have gained him at least as many detractors as admirers. Another source of controversy is his use of Carl Jung's concept of "collective unconscious" as an explanatory device, since the vast majority of psychologists outside Jungian depth psychology do not accept the concept.

His already weakened reputation was further tarnished in 1989, when he became involved in a plagiarism case after he published under his own name a serious and well-documented guide to the oddities and antiquities of Brittany, the text of which had already been published, twenty years before by a different writer, through the very same publisher.

The Breton scholar Christian-Joseph Guyonvarc'h dismissed Markale as follows; "Mr Jean Bertrand, a.k.a. Jean Markale, styles himself as a professor of classical literature. He never says where he teaches; but [...] he cannot properly accentuate Greek, knows nothing of Latin [...] he doesn't know how many cases there are in Irish declension (sometimes he says two, at other times three) [...] Jean Markale very complacently quotes his own works in his later publications and, every time an Irish text is mentioned, he refers the reader to his 'Celtic Epics' as though that book included actual translations or constituted the most basic and essential reference on the matter. All this is, at best, a joke."

However, for others, his loose scholarly presentation is balanced by "the insightful points Markale does make about various texts, clever interpretations of certain scenes and thought-provoking parallels to other traditions".
