= Clio Gould =

British musician

- Occupation: Violinist
- Employer: Royal Academy of Music
- Known for: Leader of the Royal Philharmonic Orchestra; leader of the London Sinfonietta
- Spouse: Jonathan Morton

Clio Gould is an English violinist, professor, director of the Royal Academy Soloists and leader of the Royal Philharmonic Orchestra.

== Career ==
Gould has appeared as soloist with a number of orchestras, including the London Sinfonietta, the London Philharmonic Orchestra, the Royal Philharmonic Orchestra, the BBC Symphony Orchestra, the BBC Philharmonic Orchestra, the Ulster Orchestra, the National Symphony Orchestra of Ireland, and the Royal Scottish National Orchestra.

In 2002, she became the first woman to serve as the leader of a London orchestra (the Royal Philharmonic Orchestra), and is currently the leader of the London Sinfonietta. In 2004, she collaborated with Craig Armstrong on the soundtrack of the film The Clearing.

Gould is a specialist in contemporary music and has given many first performances. She is a professor of violin at the Royal Academy of Music, and serves as director of the Royal Academy Soloists.

== Personal life ==
Gould is married to Jonathan Morton, artistic director of the Scottish Ensemble and principal first violin at the London Sinfonietta.

== See also ==
- Thomas Gould (violinist), brother
