= Jean Delpech =

Jean Delpech (1 May 1916 – 1988) was a French painter, engraver and illustrator. He designed and engraved ten stamps for the French Post Office between 1980 and 1988.

== Early life ==
Delpech was born in Hanoi on 1 May 1916. His father was an architect. He studied at the Albert-Sarraut High School Hanoi (formerly Tonkin) (from 1926 to 1934) where he was a classmate of North Vietnamese general Võ Nguyên Giáp and Phạm Văn Đồng. After graduating, Delpech joined the School of Fine Arts in Hanoi, where he studied lacquering and painting.

== Career ==
Delpech moved to Paris in 1936 where he became a professor of drawing at the Paris School of Fine Art in 1941. During the Second World War he created forged papers for the resistance. He designed and engraved ten stamps for the French Post Office between 1980 and 1988.

Delpech was influenced by the country of his childhood and his youth. Based in Paris, he enrolled at the School of Fine Arts. He won first prize of Rome in engraving intaglio in 1948: it follows a stay of four successful years in Italy. He subsequently taught drawing, painting and printmaking, among others in a workshop in Paris at the École Polytechnique.

Jean Delpech trained many young artists, many of which have since achieved fame (Philippe Mohlitz, Doaré, Houtin, Desmazières, Fernand Teyssier). He also produced postage stamps, illustrations for books and magazines, theater sets (for Dullin), medals, paintings and even stained glass.

From 1944 to 2004, his work was the subject of numerous exhibitions, individual or collective.

== Selected awards ==
- 1947 : Prix Blumenthal
- 1948 : premier grand prix de Rome
- 1953 : peintre de la Marine
- 1979 : prix Jean Chièze (gravure sur bois)

== Death ==
Delpech died in 1988.
