= Tréhorenteuc =

Tréhorenteuc Trec'horanteg
- Commune
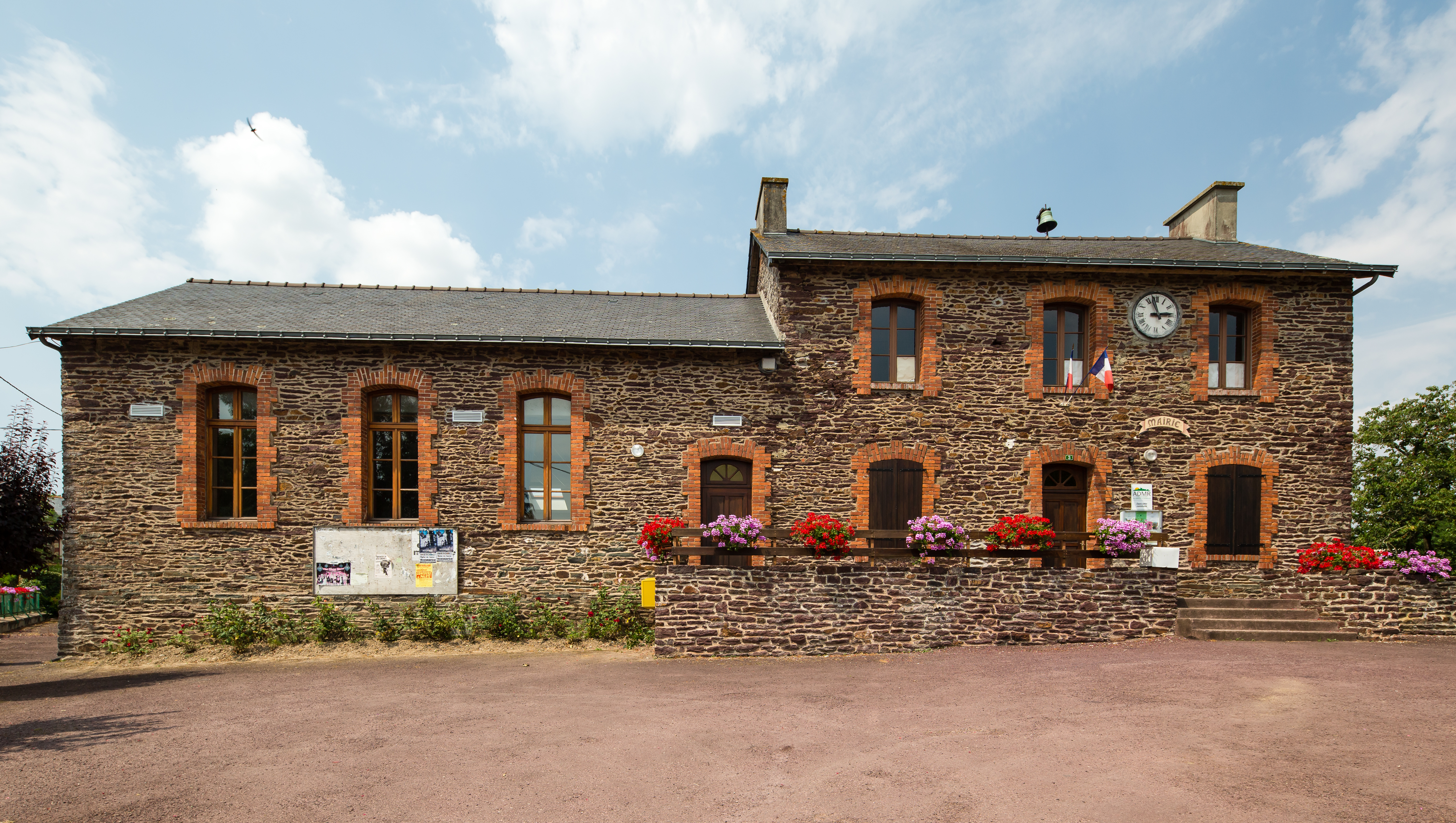
- The town hall in Tréhorenteuc
- Location of Tréhorenteuc
- Location within France Location within Brittany
- Coordinates: 48°00′33″N 2°17′11″W
- Country: France
- Region: Brittany
- Department: Morbihan
- Arrondissement: Pontivy
- Canton: Ploërmel
- Intercommunality: Ploërmel Communauté

Government
  - Mayor (2026–32): Michel Gortais
- Area^{1}: 5.42 km^{2} (2.09 sq mi)
- Highest elevation: 155 m (509 ft)
- Lowest elevation: 69 m (226 ft)
- Population (2023): 111
  - Density: 20.5/km^{2} (53.0/sq mi)
- Time zone: UTC+01:00 (CET)
  - Summer (DST): UTC+02:00 (CEST)
- INSEE/Postal code: 56256 /56430
- ^{1} French Land Register data, which excludes lakes, ponds, glaciers > 1 km^{2} (0.386 sq mi or 247 acres) and river estuaries.

Tréhorenteuc (French pronunciation: [tʁeɔʁɑ̃tœk]; Breton: Trec'horanteg) is a commune in the Morbihan department of Brittany in north-western France. Inhabitants of Tréhorenteuc are called in French Tréhorentais.

== See also ==
- Communes of the Morbihan department
