= Saint Judicael =

7th-century king of Domnonée

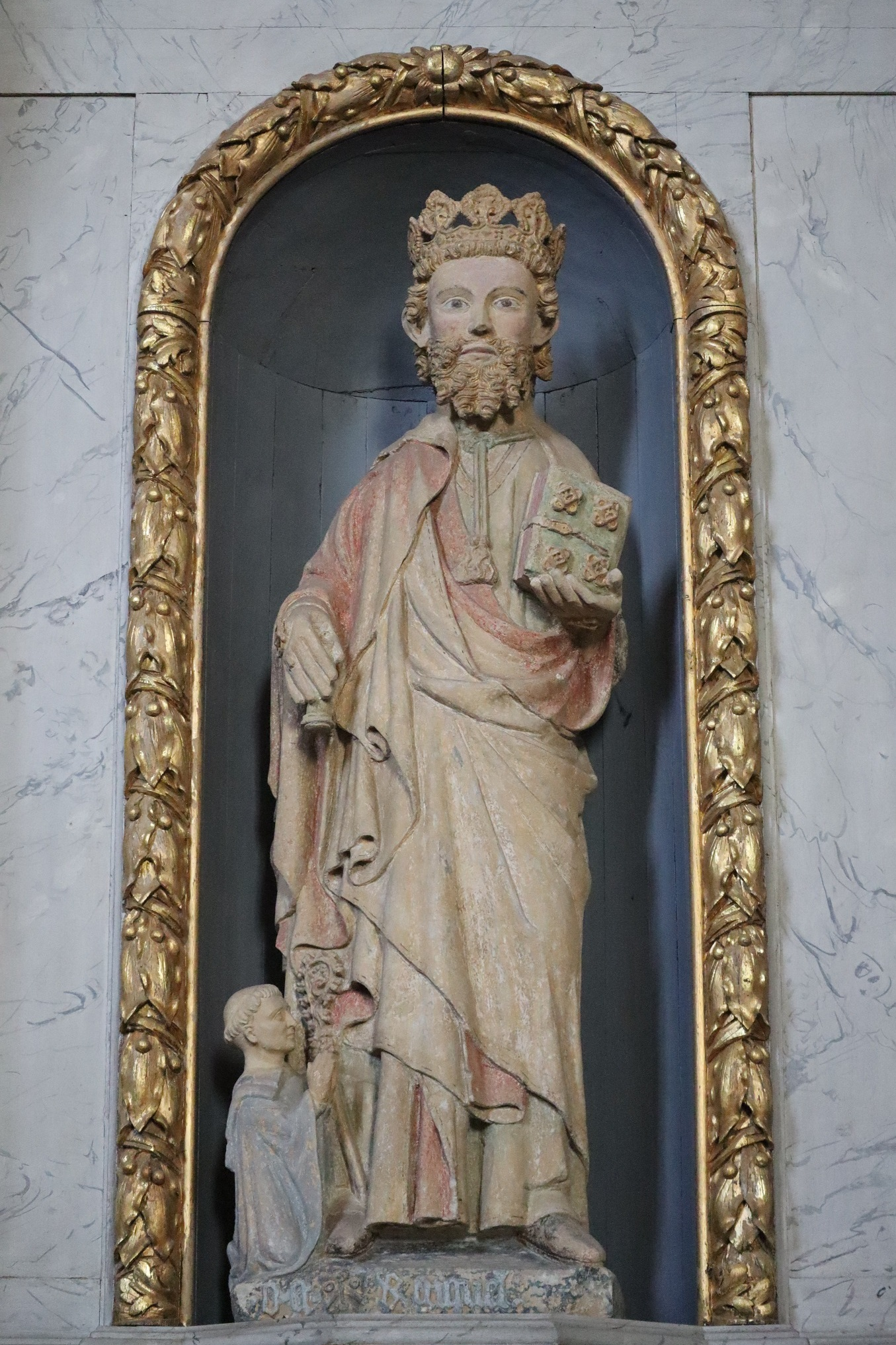
- A Medieval Statue of St Judicael at Paimpont

King of Domnonée
- Born: c. 590
- Died: 16 December 647 or 652
- Venerated in: Catholic Church
- Major shrine: Gaël
- Feast: 16 December
- Attributes: Warrior king holding a book, crown at his feet, sometimes with the Breton shield of arms

Judicael or Judicaël (c. 590 – 16 December 647 or 652) (Breton: Yudikael), also spelled Judhael (with many other variants), was the King of Domnonée, part of Brittany, in the mid-7th century and later revered as a Roman Catholic saint.

== Background ==
According to Gregory of Tours, the Bretons were divided into various regna (minor kingdoms) during the sixth century, of which Domnonée, Cornouaille, and Gwened are the best known. They initially pledged themselves to Childebert I in exchange for legitimacy. They attempted to escape Frankish rule during the time of Chilperic I, who subdued Waroch II and at least the eastern realms of the region. Guntram, Chilperic's brother, retained his lordship over Waroch and the Brittani formed a Frankish tributary-vassal state through the reign of Dagobert I.

== Hagiographic life ==
Judicael was born around the year 590, the eldest son of Judael or Judhael, King of Domnonée, and Queen Prizel, the daughter of Ausoch, Count of Léon. He was the eldest of fifteen brothers and five sisters, several of whom, such as Judoc and Guinien, were revered as saints.

When Judhael died around 605, although Judicael was his eldest son and heir, the throne was usurped by his younger brother, Haeloc, while Judicael preferred to retire to St John's Abbey in Gaël.

After the death of Haeloc in about 615, Judicael finally left the monastic life behind in order to rule Domnonée. For twenty years, he ruled the kingdom with authority and wisdom.

Around 642, Judicael retired again to St John's Abbey at Gaël or possibly to the monastery of Paimpont which he had founded. He left the throne to his brother, Judoc (aka Josse), and embraced the monastic life. The subsequent kings of Domnonée are unknown. Judicael died on Sunday 16 December in either 647 or 652. He was buried at Gaël Abbey, next to the founder and his abbot, Méen, and was later declared a saint. He is traditionally said to have been the brother of Judoc and Winnoc.

== Historicity ==
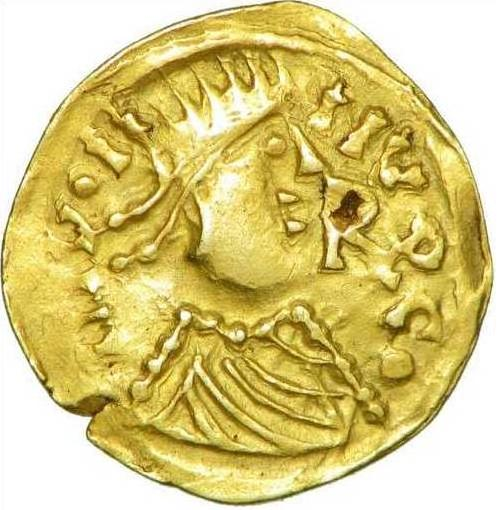
A gold coin minted by Judicael in the 630s.

Bishop Ouen of Rouen, in his 'Life of Éloi of Noyon' and the pseudo-Fredegar in his 'Chronicle' relate that in 635/636 during the reign of Dagobert I, the Bretons attacked the borders of the Franks. Threatened by the intervention of the Burgundian army which had just defeated the Basques of Soule, King Judicael agreed to come and meet the Frankish king in his palace in Clichy. Judicael exchanged presents with Dagobert, recognised his suzerainty and concluded peace. However, he was "a very religious man and had a great fear of God" and fearful of the irreligious ways of the royal court, he refused further hospitality. Judicael is known to have minted his own coins.

== Later interpretations ==
In the Cartulary of Redon, it is recorded that a noblewoman called Roiantdreh adopted King Solomon of Brittany as heir to her lands in AD 869, her son Owain having predeceased her. At the end of the document, she details her paternal ancestry over eight generations: "Jedechael begat Urbien, Urbien begat Judon, Judon begat Custentin, Custentin begat Argant, Argant begat Judwal, Judwal begat Louenan, Louenan begat Roiantdreh". Some historians, including recently Alan J. Raude, believe that, due to the presence of names from the family of the kings of Domnonée, Roiantrdreh's ancestor 'Jedechael' is King Judicael of the early 7th century. Arthur de la Borderie, however, doubted this identification because there was no mention of him being 'king and saint' as was customary.

The 'Life' of Saint Judicael written in the 11th century by a monk called Ingomar states that "all the princes who reigned in Brittany since Judicael were descended from this king" and Dom Morice uses this to postulate that he was an ancestor of a pseudo-Erispoe, Count of Rennes, and of the later kings of Brittany, designating the latter as the father of King Nominoe.

In 1514, Alain Bouchart, in his 'Grandes Chroniques' constructed a complete list of 'Kings of Brittany' largely based on the fictional work of Geoffrey of Monmouth and claimed they descended from the legendary King Conan Meriadoc. To the 10th king in the list, he gives the name, Judicael, taken from the historical king of Domnonée.

This fictional character's existence was accepted well into the eighteenth century in the works of Pierre-Hyacinthe Morice de Beaubois.

== Other reading ==
- Chardonnet, Joseph. Livre d'or des saints de Bretagne. Rennes: Armor-Éditeur, 1977. See esp. pp. 139–42.
- BHL 4503: "Bibliotheca hagiographica latina antiquae et mediae aetatis". 1898.
