= Adolphe Masselot =

French sculptor (1877–1953)

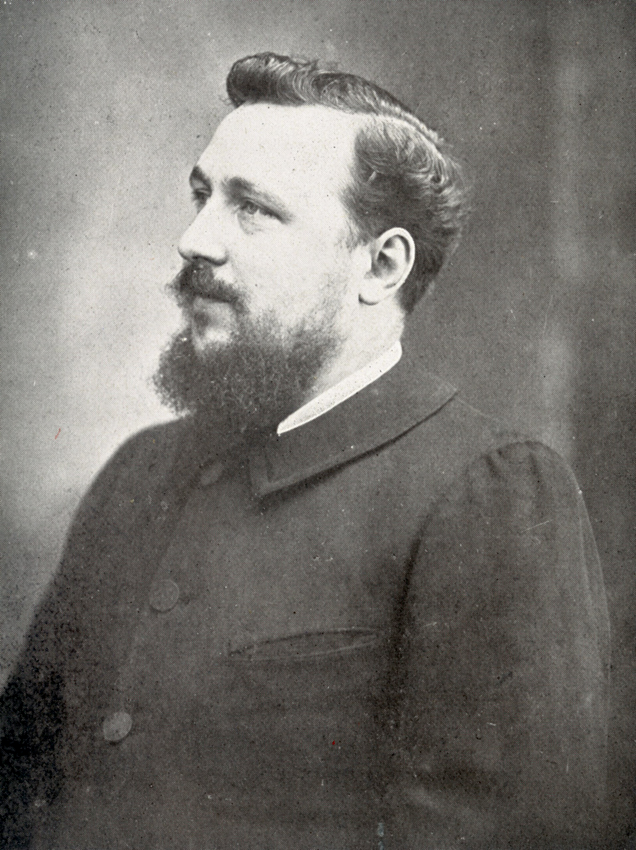
Adolphe Masselot

Adolphe Édouard Masselot (French: [adɔlf edɥaʁ maslo]; 1877–1953) was a French sculptor who is best known for his work on war memorials for which there was a huge demand after 1918. Initially he worked with Maurice Ringot. Later he would bring his sons into the business, teaching and mentoring them in the process, and ultimately forming Sociéte Alphonse Masselot. After World War II, Masselot founded a foundry with his sons.

== Early life ==
Masselot, son of Joseph Masselot (d. 1889), was born around 26 December 1877, in Lille, Nord-Pas-de-Calais, France. The family lived in central Lille near Notre Dame de Fives cathedral, east of the Grand' Place. (Note: Adolphe was at the Notre Dame de Fives cathedral on 26 December 1877, but he was not baptized on 29 December 1877. The family lived at the intersection of Rue de Calvaire and Rue Darwin, which appears to be no longer standing due to the construction of the expressway.) (Note: Adolphe's mother may have been Philomene Wilmot and died between 1935 and 1937 in Seclin, France, which is about 10 kilometers south of Lille.)

While in Lille, Masselot studied at the Saint-Pierre Institute and then attended a school of design and architecture where he learned how to sculpt. He attended the École nationale supérieure des Beaux-Arts between 1895 and 1900, when he was between 18 and 23 years of age. At the age of 18 he was awarded first prize for sculpture, under the direction of M. Boutry. In 1898 he spent three days competing for a departmental scholarship and won several medals for his work. (Note: The school of design and architecture he attended at Lille was on the corner of Rue de Monnaie and Place du Concert.)

== Career ==
Prior to World War I, Masselot was director of the "Lille Cinéma" and when in 1918 he returned from military service he was persuaded by fellow sculptor Maurice Ringot to join him in Normandy and there they worked together on monument aux morts (war memorials) in Caudebec-en-Caux, La Mailleraye-sur-Seine and other communes. Masselot began to teach his sons and founded the family company Sociéte Alphonse Masselot. Many commissions came Masselot's way including the monument at Mont Kemmel to all the French soldiers who died in the 1914–1918 war in Belgium. As well as the monument aux morts at Comines, he also worked on that at Deûlémont.

== Monument aux morts at Comines ==
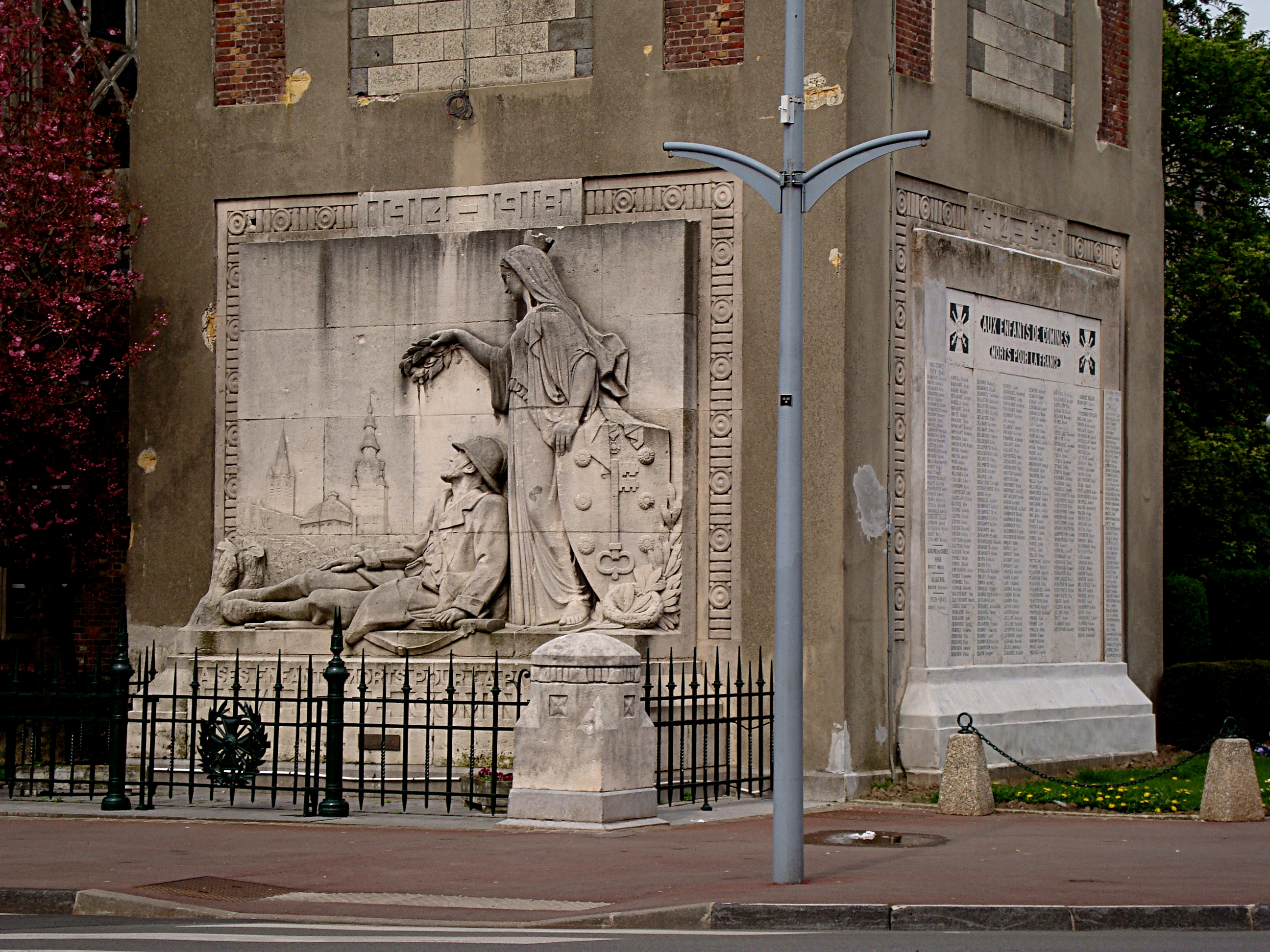
Comines monument aux morts

Comines lies on the Franco-Belgian border and is split into two parts: Comines (France) and Comines (Belgium), all part of the municipality of Comines-Warneton. The Comines monument aux morts lies at the foot of the campanile of the parish church of Saint Chrysole. This campanile replaced the old Belfry and has three bells, one of which is called the "cloche des morts" and bears the inscription "Enfants de Comines tués pendant la guerre franco-allemande de 1914–1918". Comines had been virtually destroyed during the war and the architects Maurice Storez and Dom Paul Bellot were charged with the rebuilding of the church whilst Louis-Marie Cordonnier was the architect for the new town hall and Belfry. Masselot's monument aux morts consists of a splendid bas-relief and in the background Masselot has carved the town of Comines as it was before the war with its 1623 Belfry and 1701 town hall. In the centre of the bas-relief a woman kneels and places a crown of laurels onto the head of a dying soldier.

== Other works ==
- A statue of Saint Anthony of Padua. This is in the parish church of Saint Maurice in Lille's rue de Paris.
- Also in the church of Saint Maurice is the monument to Jules-Emile Lasne. Masselot worked on the marble bust and the rest of the monument was the work of a mason. Lasne had been a popular curate at Saint Maurice. The monument was inaugurated on 10 November 1913.
- In the Musée de la Chartreuse in Douai there is a médaillon by Masselot featuring a portrait of Victor Dubron.

Working with Robert Coin and Léon Morice Masselot also worked on the Calvary at the Basilique Sainte-Thérèse in Lisieux. He also worked on a statue of the Archangel Saint Michel at the parish church of Saint-Vaast in Armentières

== Personal life and war service ==
In the town of the Northern French town of Lille, he married Marguerite Piétin. They were to have four children of which three were boys. He served in the army during the 1914–1918 war and became a prisoner of war. During the 1939–1945 war, his sons served in the forces and two of them became prisoners of war. After the war Masselot and his sons started an aluminium foundry.

== See also ==
- Masselot
