= Canard d'Estaires =

French breed of duck

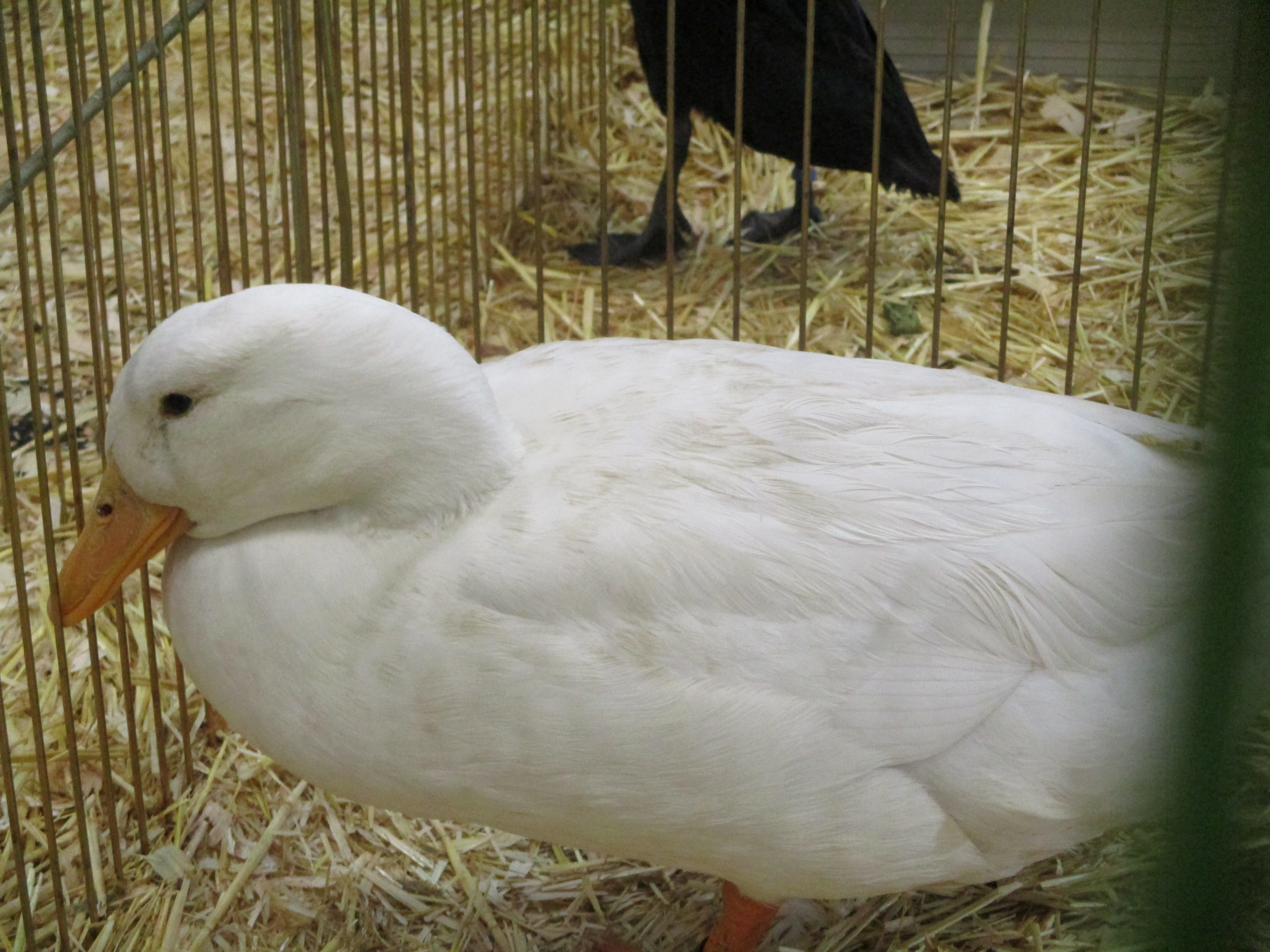
- Country of origin: France
- Distribution: Nord (Nord-Pas-de-Calais)

Classification

The Canard d'Estaires or Estaires duck is a French breed of domestic duck which originated from North France, from the same region as the Estaires chicken.

== History ==
This breed was developed in the Estaires area along the banks of the Lys river, using local ducks and the American Pekin duck. It never saw widespread development outside the Estaires area and has become quite rare today.

== Description ==
The Estaires duck shares the same shape as the Bourbourg duck (also white-feathered and also from Nord-Pas-de-Calais). However, the Estaires duck is smaller, weighing approximately 2.2 kg (4.9 lb).. The banding size is 16 mm (0.63 in) for both sexes.

== See also ==
- Estaires chicken

== Sources ==
- Dr Alain Fournier (2005). L'Élevage des oies et des canards. Artémis. p. 41.
