= Estaires chicken =

Breed of chicken

Poule d'Estaires
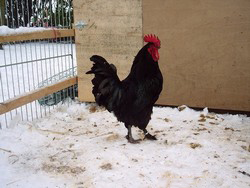
- Country of origin: France

Traits
- Weight: Male: 2.2 kg; Female: 2.2 kg

Classification
- EE: France
- Chicken; Gallus gallus domesticus

The Poule d'Estaires (French pronunciation: [pul detɛʁ]) is a breed of domestic chicken from the Nord-Pas-de-Calais region of north-eastern France. It is a variety of the Langshan breed imported to England from China in 1872, and exported from there to Europe soon after. Some were raised in the Pas-de-Calais département, and others in the neighbouring Nord département, particularly in the areas of Estaires, La Gorgue, Laventie and Merville, from which birds were supplied to Lille.

A breeders' club was formed in 1999, and in 2004 the breed came under the protection of the Centre Régional de Ressources Génétiques, the genetic resource centre of the Nord – Pas de Calais region.

== Characteristics ==
The Estaires breed is closely similar to the Croad Langshan: the comb is small and regularly serrated, the legs are dark slate-blue or almost black and are slightly feathered. The plumage is black with beetle-green lights; there are also gold- and silver-necked colour variants.

== See also ==
- Estaires duck
