= Philippe Cannissié =

French painter and architect

Jean-Baptiste Philippe Cannissié (19 January 1799, in Landau – 7 August 1877, in Lille) was a French architect and painter. He was architect to the city of Lille from 1849 to 1867, notably overseeing the restoration of the Église Saint-Maurice.

== Biography ==
Philippe Cannissié was born on January 19, 1799, in Landau.

He began studying at the Beaux-Arts de Paris in 1819. In Paris, he worked alongside his former teacher, André Chatillon (architect for the Seine department).

He served as the city architect of Lille from 1849 to 1867. Lille owes him, in particular, the restoration of Saint-Maurice, Lille. Philippe Cannissié oversaw the restoration of the church until his death. He had the sacristies built, erected on the east side of the building between 1859 and 1863, and the three western bays of the nave along with the bell tower between 1867 and 1877, all while maintaining a high degree of architectural consistency.

He was a founding member of the Society of Architects of the North in 1868, an initiative spearheaded by Auguste Mourcou and Émile Vandenbergh. He served as its first president. He was also a member of the Imperial and Central Society of Architects of Paris.

He was the father of Henri Cannissié (1843–1907), who, like him, became an architect in Lille.
