= Masselot =

Masselot is the name of a family whose origin has been attested since the Middle Ages in Flanders and in the County of Hainaut, at the Court of Mons. This family afforded persons from all kind of fields. This family is descended among others from William I of England. However, this is not attested for the Flemish branch.

The name is spelled in several ways Masselot, Masseloot, Masselos, Masselo, Maslo. All spellings are pronounced the same way "Maslo" and has an origin in Russia. Масло (transliterated Maslo) means butter, oil, and is a very common word. The name spelling is adapted to local usage when the family has emigrated a long time ago. For families more recently installed in Flanders or in France, the spelling comes directly from transliteration. The origin of this name is not the Old French word macelote, which denominated a kind of bludgeon during the Middle Ages.

The Masselot are now living all over the France, but also in Canada (Ste-Hyacinthe) and in the United States (Vermont, Illinois) where the name has changed into Lashway after the mutation of the nickname Lajoie, which was attributed to the Canadian branch of the Masselot originally coming from Lorraine (Masselot-Lajoie). Members of this family are also living in Belgium (Mons), in Italy, in Ireland and in Germany (Lower Saxony, Rhineland-Palatinate and Sarre).

== Personalities with this surname ==
- Adolphe Masselot, sculptor who realized some artworks situated in the Nord-Pas-de-Calais region of France.
- Annick Masselot, professor of law in New Zealand.
- Georges Masselot, colonel who participated to the Algerian War and the Algiers putsch of 1961.
