= Robert Coin =

French sculptor and engraver

Robert Coin (1901–1988) was a French sculptor and engraver, born in Saint-Quentin on 17 December 1901. He died in Lille on 12 February 1988.

== Works ==
=== Basilique de Lisieux ===
Some of Coin's best known works are those which he executed at the Basilique de Lisieux. Lisieux is in Calvados in Basse-Normandie. In the pediment at the front of the Basilica is a tympanum with depictions of those who had contributed to the creation of the Basilica, ranged on either side of Coin's statue of St Therese herself. These people are from left to right: Monseignor Octave Germain, Mother Agnès de Jésus (1861–1951) Sister Pauline Martin, Sister Thérèse, the Prioress of Carmel, Cardinal Pacelli (1876–1958) the future Pope Pius XII, Monseigneur Picaud, the Bishop of Bayeux who became Pope Pius XI (1857–1939), Cardinal Suhard (1874–1949) Archbishop of Paris and Father Maurice-Marie-Louis Bellière (1874–1907) a missionary. Around these people are a soldier and some children. The inscriptions on the tympanum read:

" O mon Dieu, vous avez dépassé mon attente et moi je chanterai vos miséricordes" and "Béni soit le Seigneur car il a tellement glorifié ton nom aujourd'hui que ta louange sera toujours sur les lèvres des hommes"

— inscription

A photograph of the tympanum is shown below and in the gallery are some of the carvings within the tympanum, all these photographs supplied courtesy Marc Dan.

Another of Coin's works in the Basilica was on the interior side of the main entrance. This is another tympanum depicting Jesus and the Apostles and the Virgin of Mount Carmel. The inscription reads-

"CELUI QUI SE SERA FAIT PETIT COMME CET ENFANT SERA LE PLUS GRAND DANS LE ROYAUME DES CIEUX"

— inscription

A photograph can be seen in the gallery below, this also courtesy of Marc Don. Another of Coin's works are the "Seven Virtues" on the lower gallery of the front of the Basilica. A photograph is shown below, again courtesy of Marc Don. In the centre Coin has depicted "Charity" with "Faith" on one side and "Hope" on the other. To the left of these three statues are "Justice" and "Prudence" and on the right "Strength" and "Moderation".

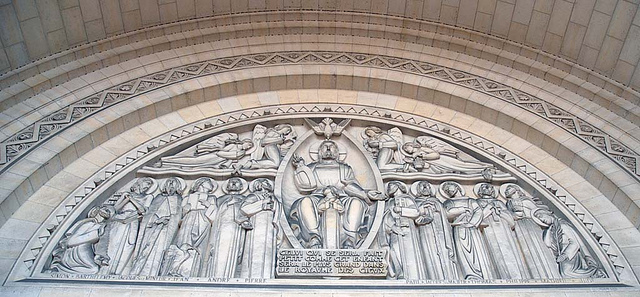
Tympanum on interior of entrance to Basilica at Lisieux. Shows Jesus with the Apostles and the Virgin of Mount Carmel.

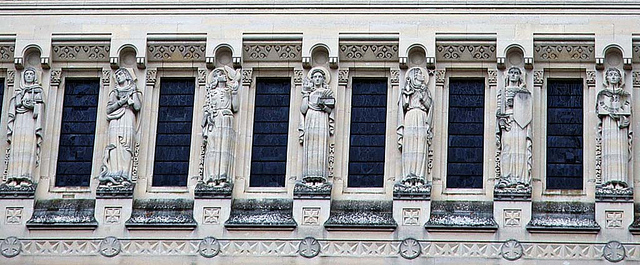
Coin's carvings of "The Seven Virtues"

=== Other works ===
Work	Location	Produced	Subject, notes and references
"Monument Commemorative de la Defense Nationale en 1870".	Lille. Nord-Pas-de-Calais	1933	The original monument which remembered the Franco-Prussian War had been destroyed by the Germans in 1918 and Coin did the sculptural work on the 1933 replacement. The monument is situated near the Pont Ramonneau. It is dedicated to Achille Testerlin.
La Bourse du Travail	Calais Nord-Pas-de-Calais		Coin carved a relief for the old "Employment Exchange" building in Calais.
Monument to Roger Salengro and Gustave Delory	Lille. Nord-Pas-de-Calais		The monument standing in front of the Lille "Mairie" pays tribute to Roger Salengro and Gustave Delory who were the first two socialist mayors of Lille. Coin carved the bas-relief on the monument.
Lille Town Hall	Lille. Nord-Pas-de-Calais	1931	Coin was commissioned to sculpt a bronze gilded bust of "Marianne" representing the Republic. Originally it was placed on a pedestal. It appears that the bust is currently in storage. Coin received a similar commission for the town hall of Béthune and this is still on display
The facade of "La Voix du Nord" building in the Grande Place, Lille.	Lille. Nord-Pas-de-Calais		Coin executed a relief for the facade of the "La Voix du Nord" building in the Grande Place, Lille. The relief bore the inscription "Défendre le travail dans la région du Nord".
Dunkirk Hôtel de Ville	Dunkerque Nord-Pas-de-Calais	1955 to 1958	The region of Flanders prides itself on her Town Halls and Dunkirk has had a town hall since 1233. It was Louis Cordonnier who designed the 1896 Town Hall which reflected Dunkirk's growing importance as a maritime and commercial centre. That building was inaugurated on 30 May 1897 by Émile Loubet, the Président of France, on the occasion of a visit to Dunkirk by Tsar Nicolas Il. This Town Hall was destroyed during the Second World War mainly as a consequence of the bombing on 27 May 1940 when Dunkirk found itself under siege. In 1947 the rebuilding project got underway and the son of Louis Cordonnier was appointed as architect. The new Town Hall was inaugurated on 15 October 1955 by the French President René Coty and work was finally completed in 1974. In 1955 that the mayor of Dunkirk, Paul Asseman commissioned Robert Coin to execute eight decorative panels in the town hall's interior. The first panels were installed in 1956 in the "Salle des Mariages ". The themes were "la Force dans l'adversité", "la Prospérité dans la paix", "l'Homme dominant la mer" and "l'Homme domptant le feu". The next series of panels were installed in 1958 in the "Salle du Conseil" and these represented Industry, Commerce, Agriculture and the Sea.
Cathédrale Notre-Dame de la Treille in Lille.	Lille. Nord-Pas de Calais	1941	Coin carried out some sculptural work for this church.
Statue of the Tourcoing poet Jules Watteeuw	Tourcoing	1973	The Watteeuw monument is located in the square Winston Churchill. Dedicated to the memory of the Tourcoing poet.
The Church of St Maurice	Lille. Nord-Pas-de-Calais		Coin carried out sculptural work for this church.
The Church of St Vaast	Estaires. Nord-Pas-de-Calais	1927 to 1930	The original church was totally destroyed by the retreating Germans in 1918 and was rebuilt between 1927 and 1930. Coin created several sculptures for the rebuilt church.
