= Saint-Maurice, Lille =

Coordinates: 50°38′08.9″N 03°04′01.7″E

Church Saint Maurice, Lille
- Église Saint Maurice
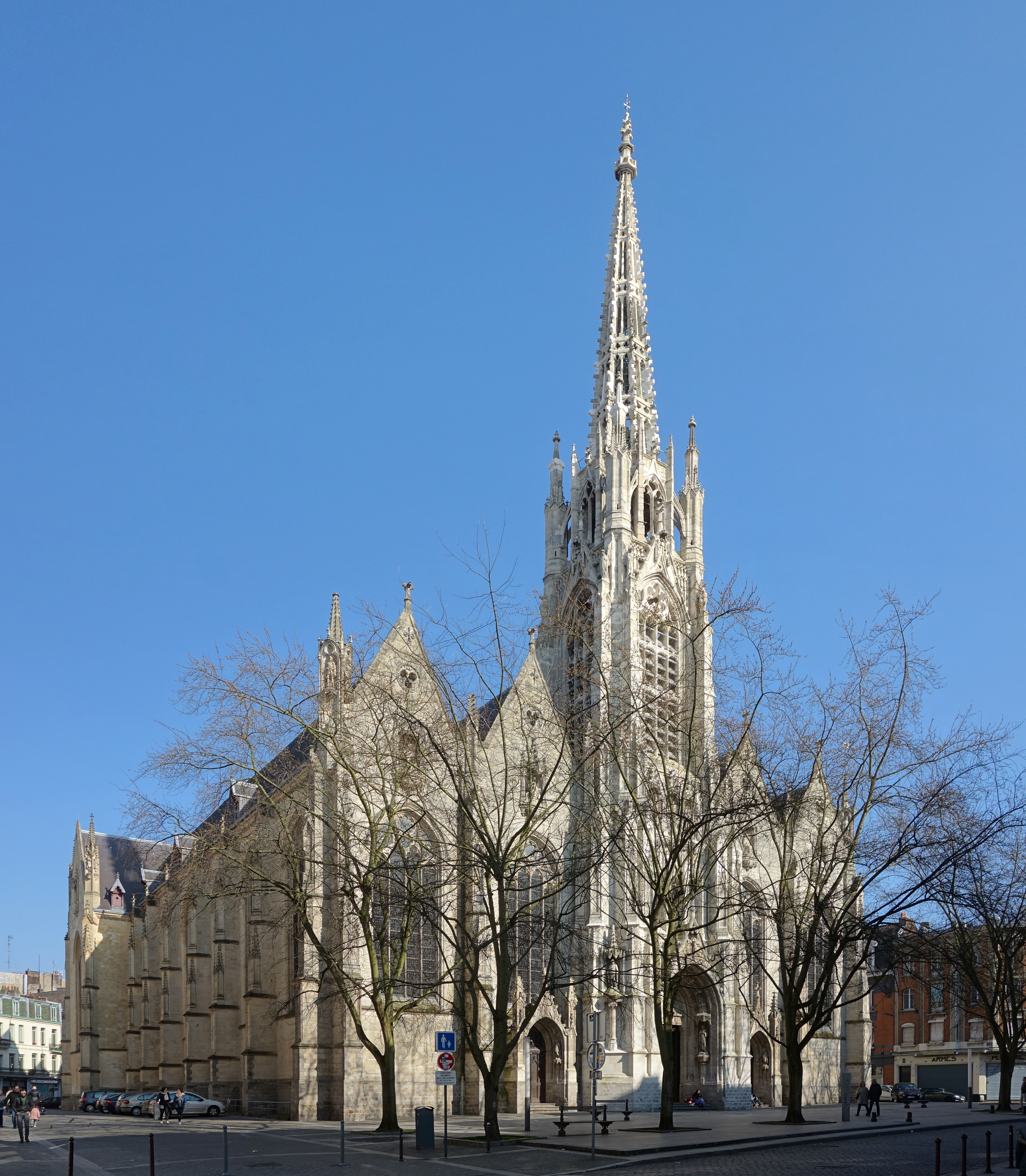
- Church Saint Maurice, Lille
- Location: Lille
- Country: France
- Denomination: Catholic Church

Architecture
- Heritage designation: Monument historique
- Designated: 1914
- Architect: Philippe Cannissié (19th century restoration)
- Style: Gothic and Neo Gothic hall church
- Completed: 14th–19th centuries

The Église Saint-Maurice is a church on Rue Pierre-Mauroy, in the historic centre of Lille, northern France. Its construction began at the end of the 14th century and completed at the end of the 19th century, and it was extended over more than four centuries. A hall church in the Gothic style, it was made a monument historique in 1914.

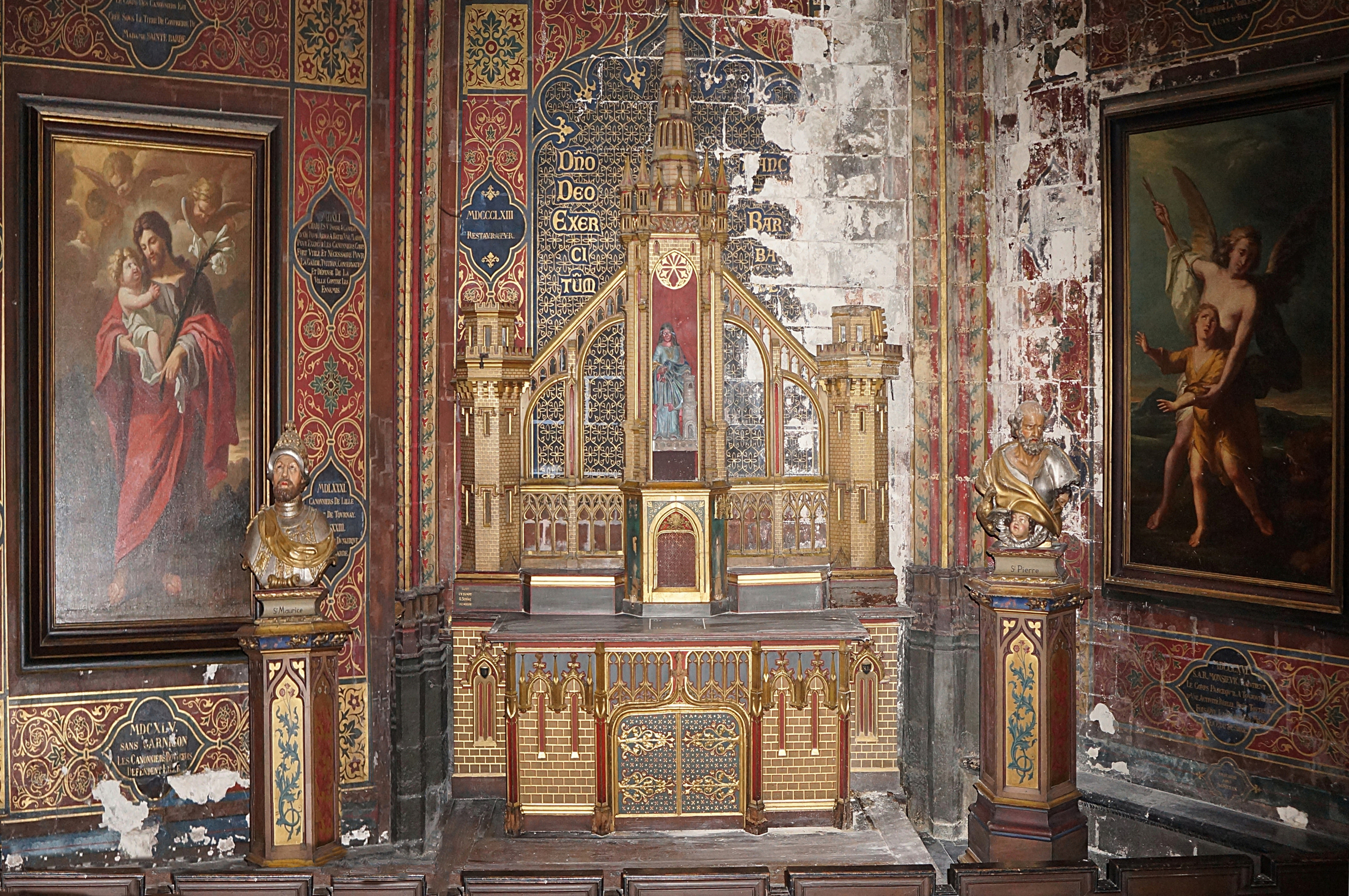
Altar in the church Saint Maurice

== Gallery ==
=== Stained Glass ===
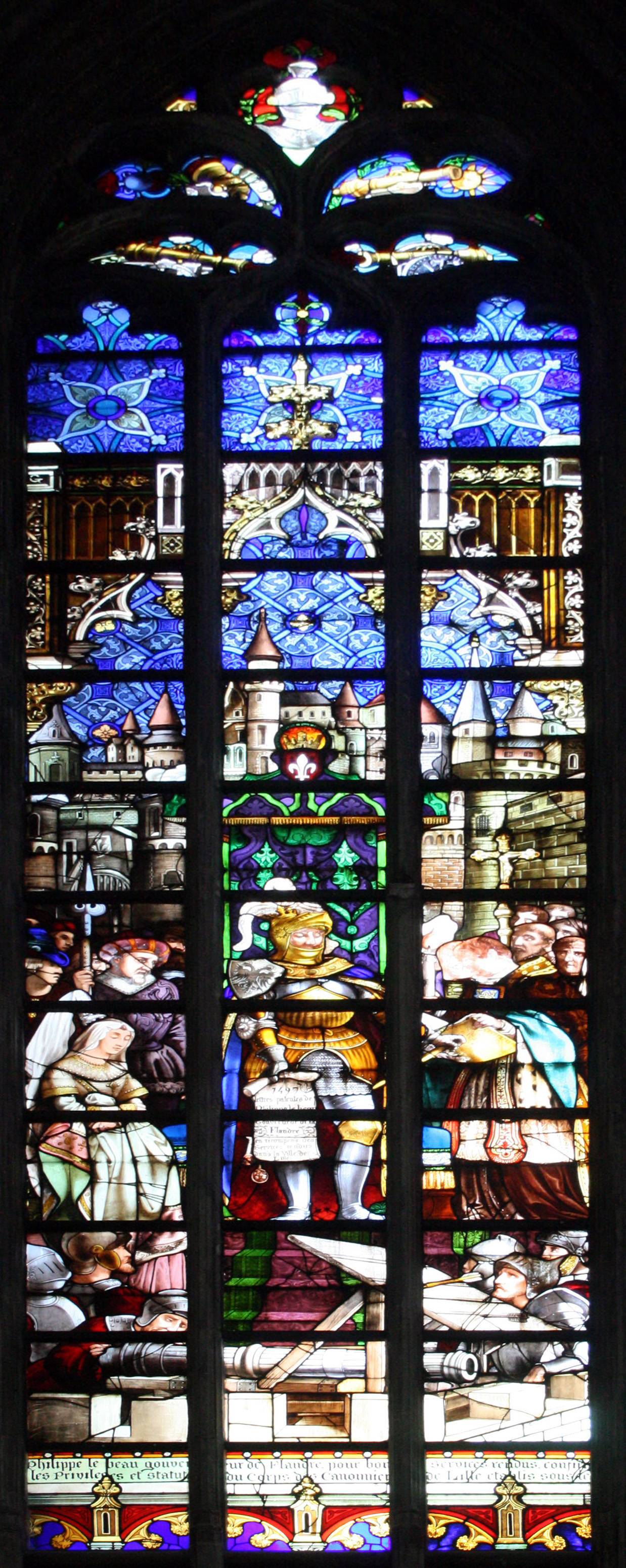

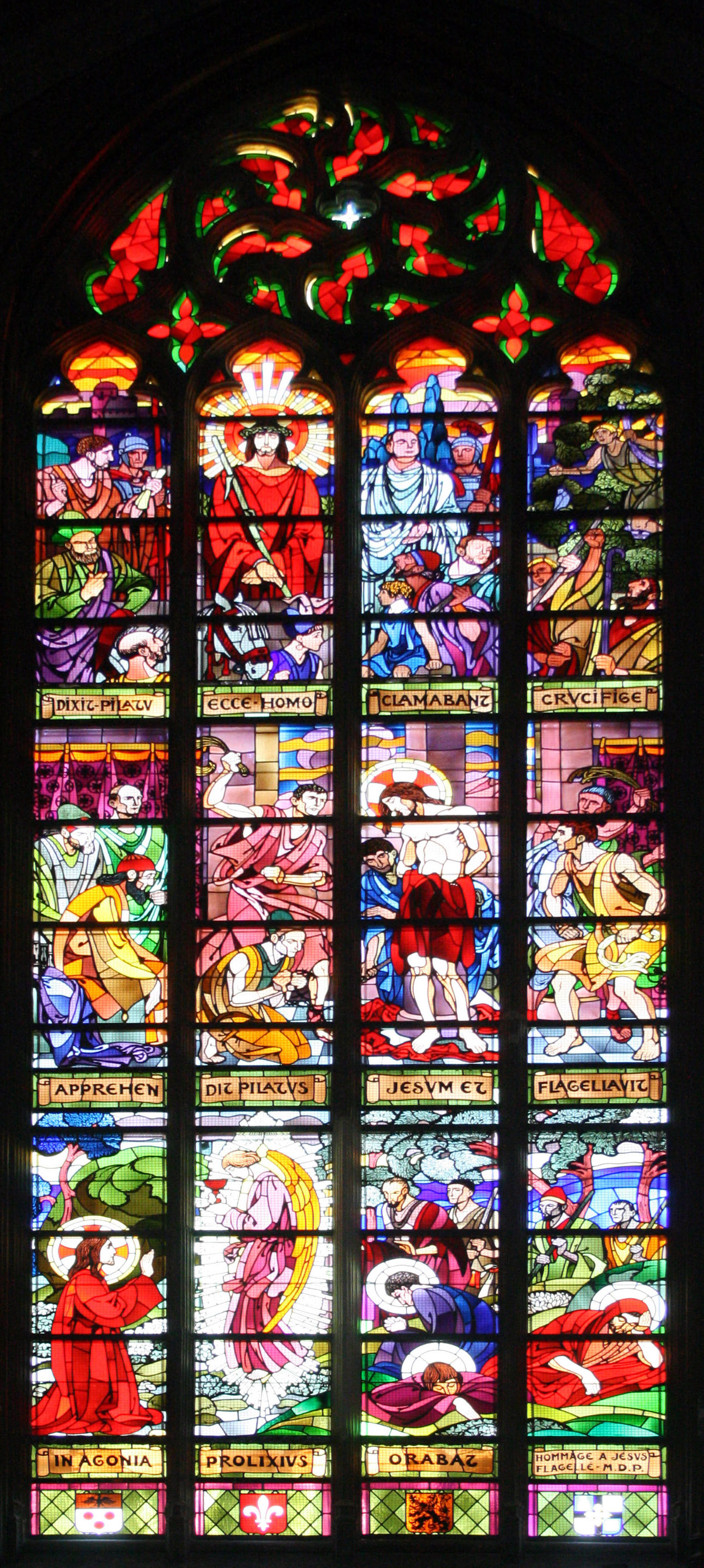

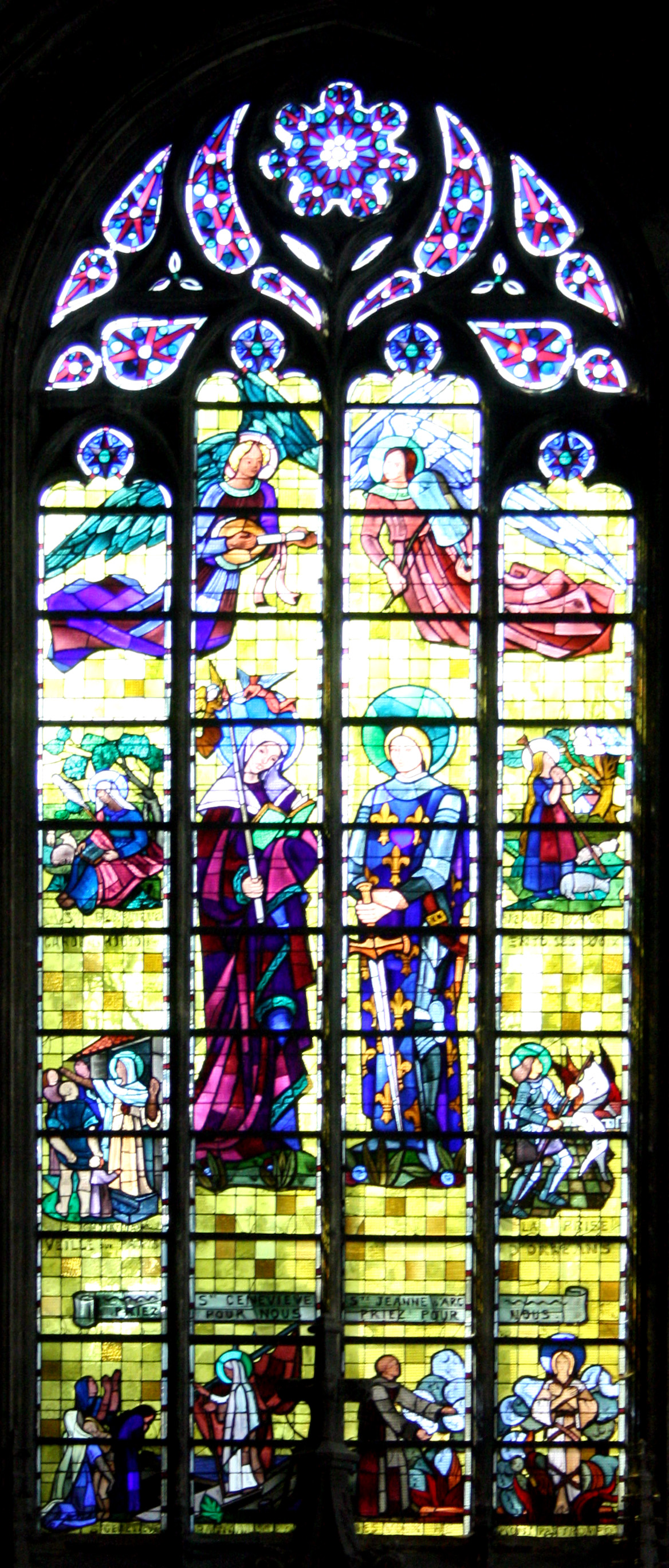

=== Statues ===
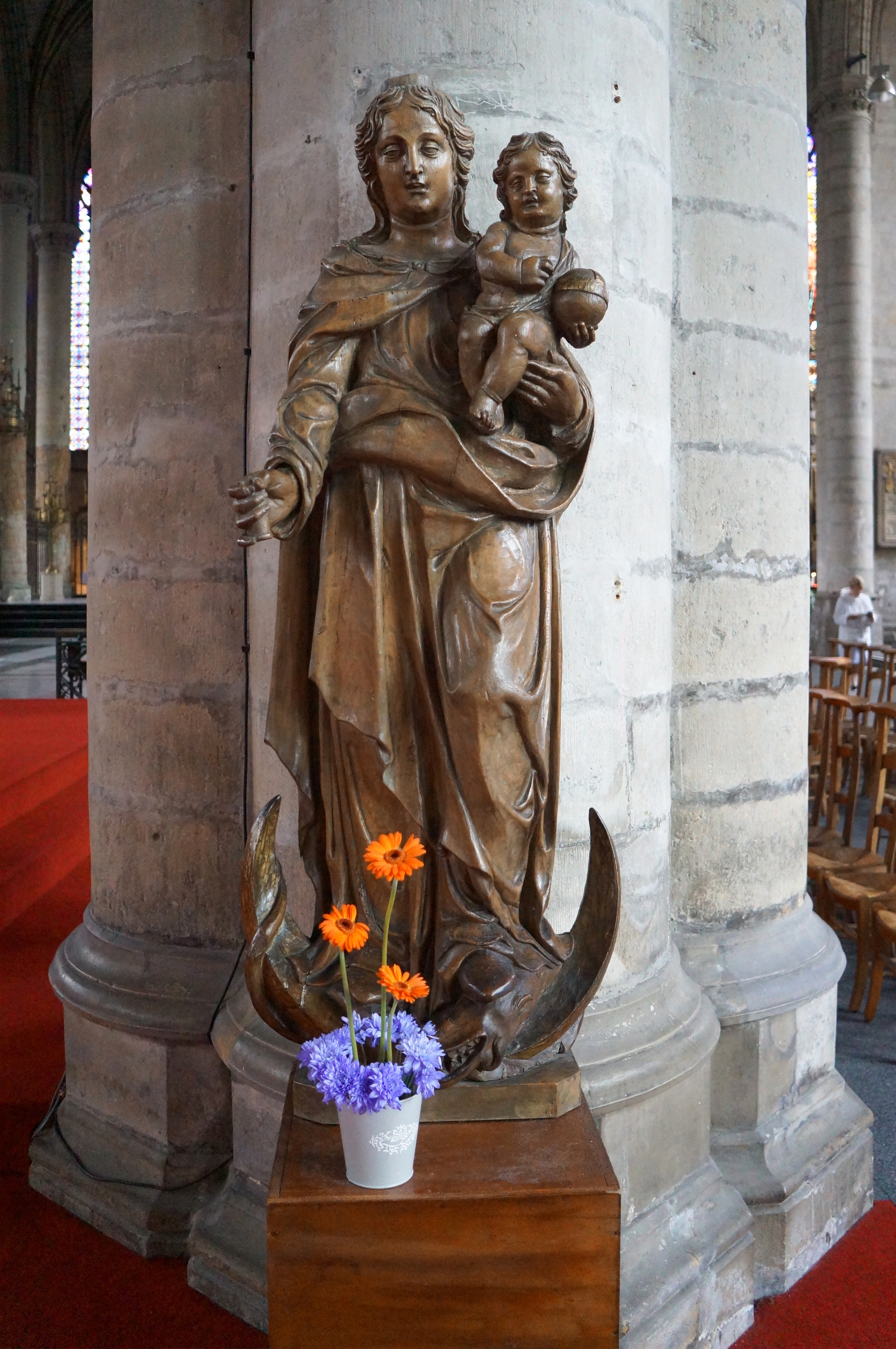

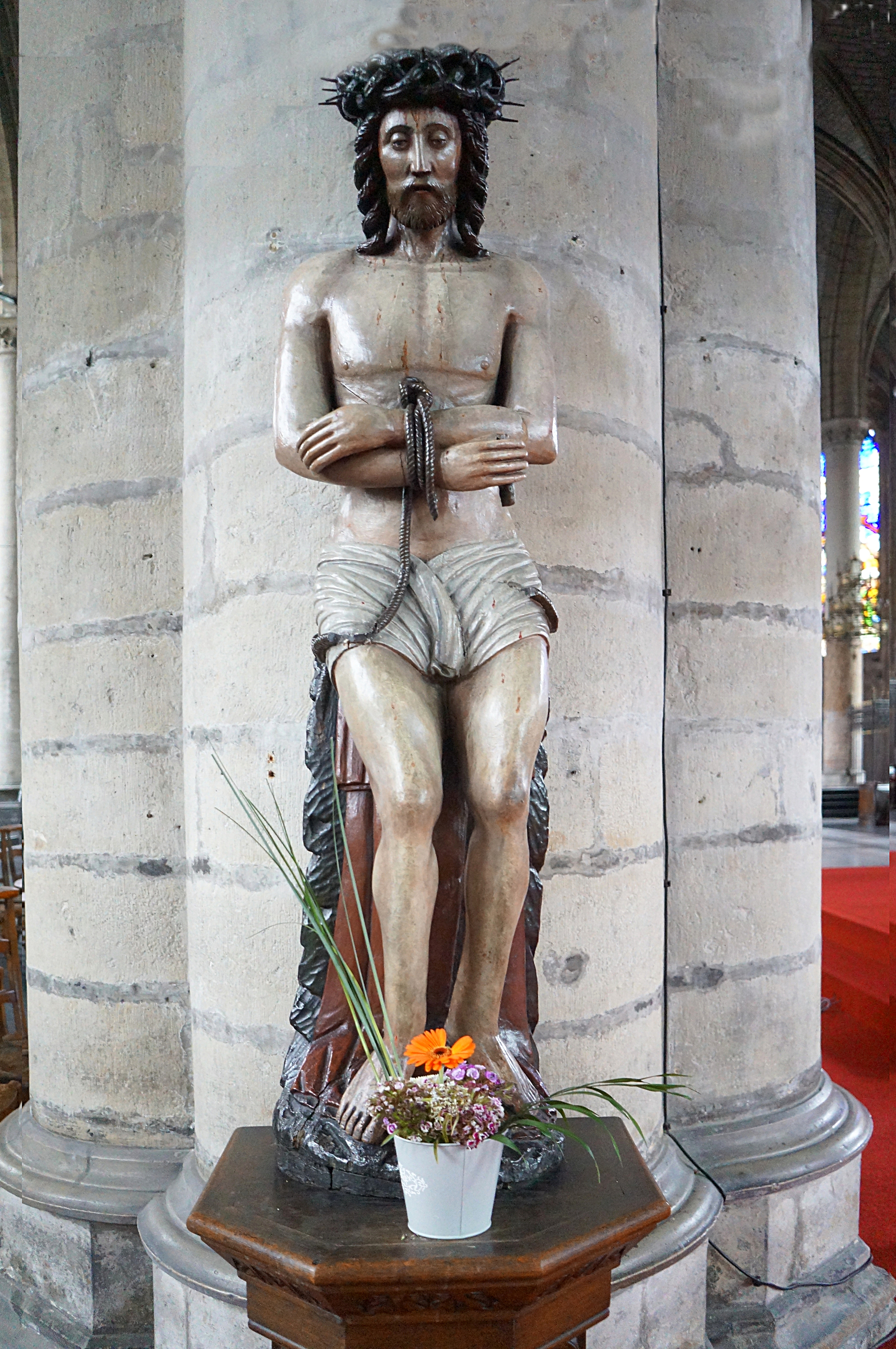

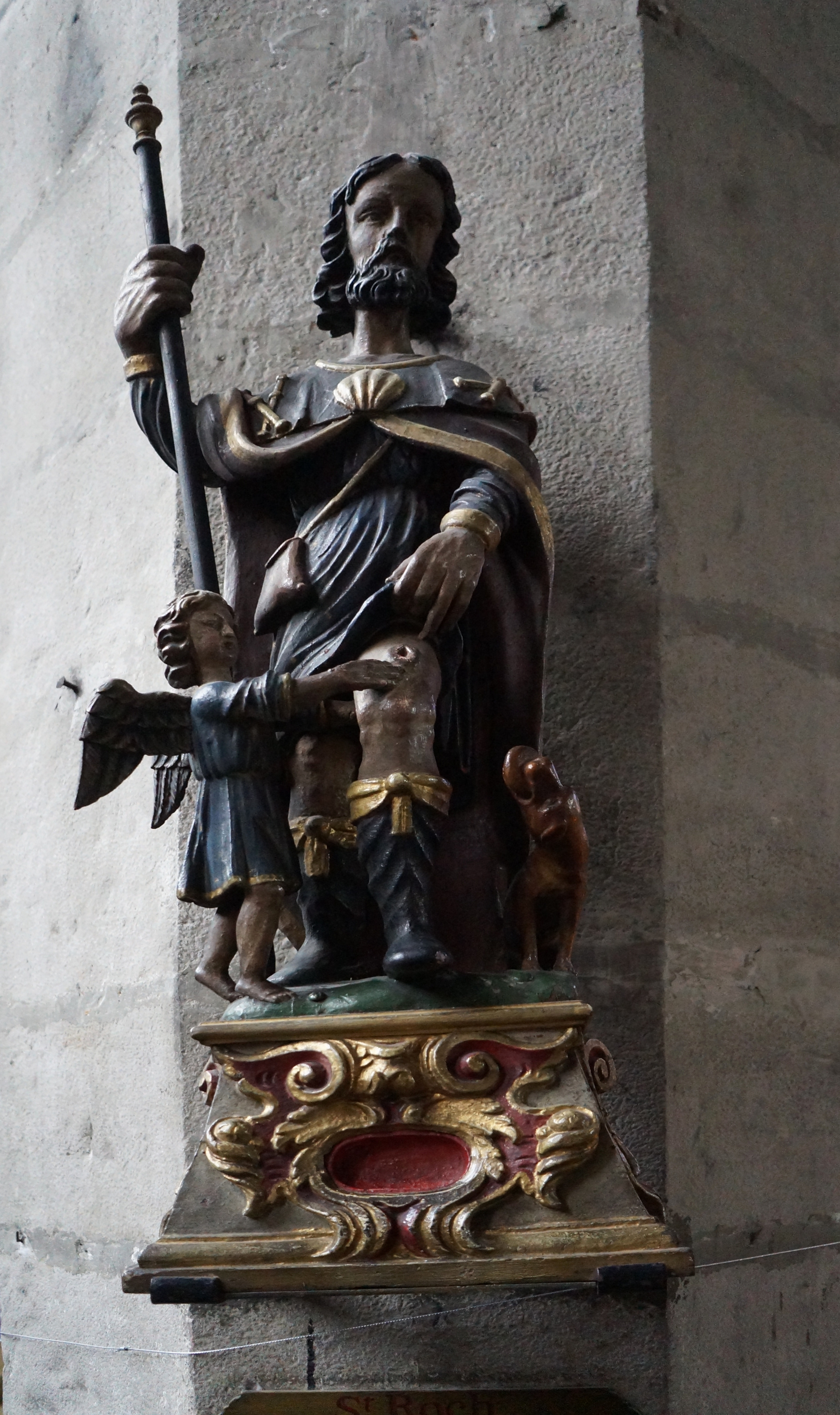
