= Maurice Ringot =

French sculptor

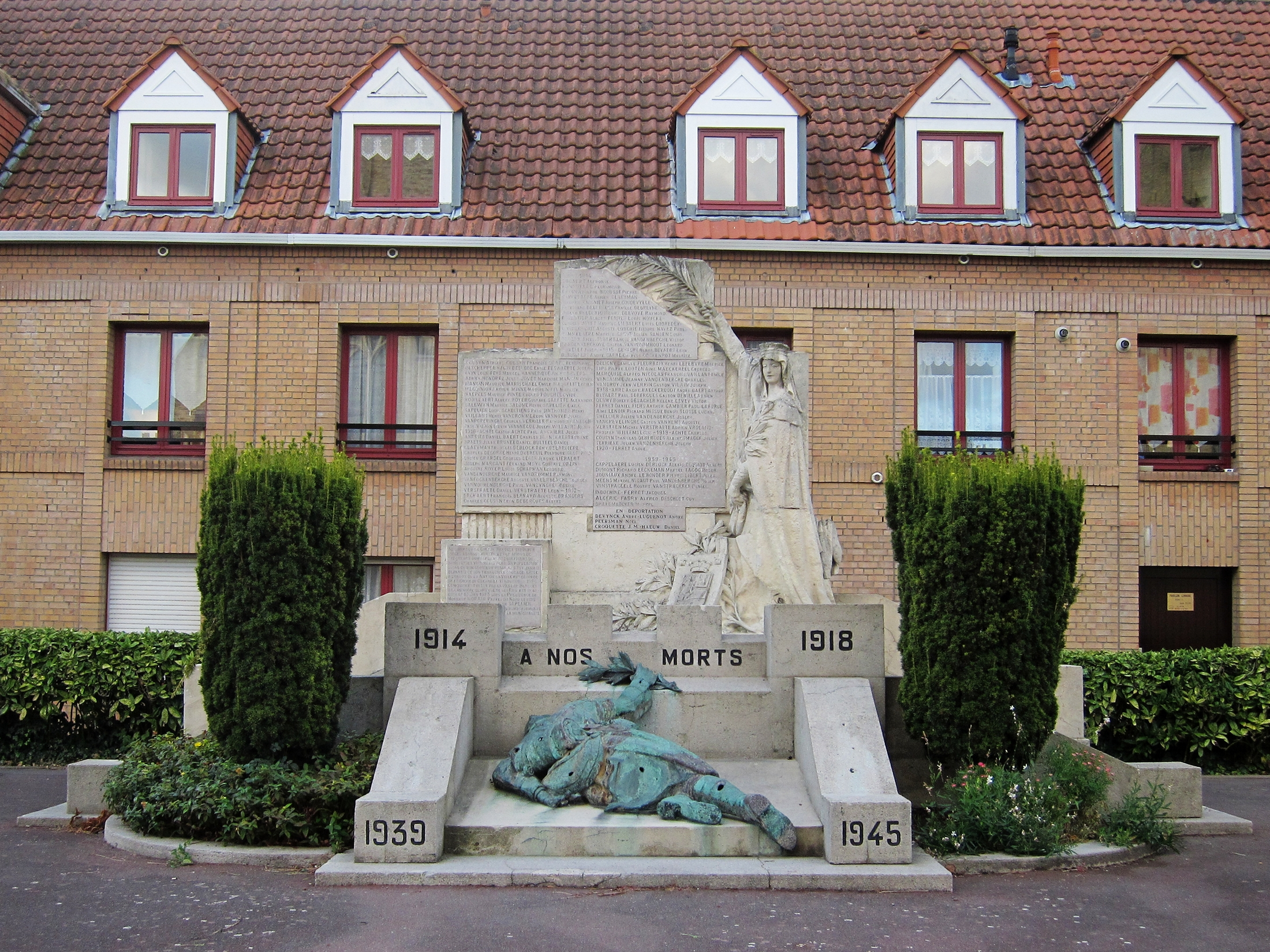
- Bergues War Memorial. Image shown courtesy Velvet.
- Born: 1880; Bergues
- Died: 1951 (aged 70–71)
- Education: At the École des Beaux-Arts in Lille.
- Known for: Sculpture
- Notable work: See listing below.

Maurice Ringot (French: [mɔʁis ʁɛ̃ɡo]; 1880 in Bergues – 1951) was a French sculptor, best known for his war memorials. He also did work for churches and private individuals.

== Early life ==
Ringot came from a family of marbriers and sculptors, and studied in local colleges before entering the École des Beaux-Arts in Lille and then Paris. After his studies he returned to Bergues, married Hélène Sagary and set up his studio in the rue de l'Arsenal. There he produced his first major monument: the figure of Johannes Gutenberg for the front of the then Le Nord Maritime newspaper building in Dunkirk. This work is now in the Jean Bart school.

In 1910 he moved to Malo-les-Bains and employed several workers and artists, one of whom was Louis Piron. Seven years later Ringot moved to the Seine-Maritime region and lived and worked there for several years before returning to Malo-les-Bains where he lived out the rest of his life.

== War memorials ==
French towns and villages often gave priority to local sculptors when erecting their war memorials and therefore Ringot was often chosen to sculpt war memorials in the Nord department. He also worked on war memorials for the Seine-Maritime area where he was a resident for some time.

Place	Location	Subject, notes and references
"Union Sportive Dunkerque-Malo" Memorial	Dunkerque, Nord	This memorial was dedicated to members of the Union Sportive Dunkerque-Malo sporting association, but it was destroyed during the Second World War. It was built in 1924.
Le Trait	Rouen, Seine-Maritime	This memorial lies in the canton of Duclair, Rouen. It was inaugurated on 12 September 1920. Ringot lived in Le Trait for a period. His brother, an architect, had been commissioned in 1917 to work on renovation of the shipyard and it is thought that Ringot would have been commissioned to execute this memorial due to his brother's contacts in the Le Trait area.
Annœullin war memorial	Annœullin, Nord	This memorial took the form of an obelisk with a funeral urn at the top and grieving figures below. It is located at the entrance of the local cemetery.
Sainte-Marguerite-sur-Duclair War Memorial	Duclair, Seine-Maritime	A soldier stands with an unfurled flag in Ringot's composition for this war memorial.
Saint-Paër War Memorial	Saint-Paër, Seine-Maritime	Ringot carried out the sculptural work for this war memorial. Saint-Paër is in the canton of Duclair near Rouen. A figure of "Marianne" carries a flag.
Malo-les-Bains War Memorial	Malo-les-Bains, Nord	Ringot was the sculptor of the original Malo-les-Bains War Memorial which now stands in the town's cemetery. Malo-les-Bains is a small town, which lies 3 kilometres east of Dunkirk. Several First World War casualties are buried in the south-western part of the cemetery. Another War memorial, erected in the town's centre, was made by Edmond Delphaut.
Bergues War Memorial	Bergues, Nord	Bergues is situated 9 kilometers to the south of Dunkirk. Ringot's memorial consists of a wall upon which are recorded the names of the dead of Bergues. A woman holding a palm leaf stands to the right of the wall. Below and on the ground in front of the wall is a dead soldier clutching a branch of laurel. The monument was inaugurated on 10 June 1923, damaged in fighting in 1940, and restored in 1945. Several bullet holes can still be seen in the body of the soldier.
Rosendaël War Memorial	Rosendaël, Nord	Ringot produced another dramatic composition for Rosendaël, which is also situated close to Dunkirk. The memorial stands in the Place de l'Abbée Bonpain and honours the 481 local citizens who were killed in the Great War. At the top of the composition are two women, one standing and representing France, the other sitting and representing "History and Letters". The woman depicting France is speaking, perhaps recounting the events of the war, whilst the seated woman is listening to her and is ready to write in the book which she holds. Below several soldiers, led by a winged Angel of Victory, appear to spring out from a grave, rising as it were from the dead. The headstone has splintered and symbolically fallen and crushed a German Imperial eagle. Around the base Ringot has sculpted some smaller groups representing the horrors of war: the death of a loved one, aerial bombings, sinking of ships, and the "forced labour" of French citizens sent to work in German factories and on German farms during the war. The monument was inaugurated on 6 November 1921 by the Rosendaël mayor Félix Coquelle. Also in Rosendaël, Ringot designed a monument honouring René Bonpain, a well-loved local cleric, active in the resistance, arrested and shot by the Germans in 1943. Gallery below includes a photograph of the Bonpain monument shown courtesy Pichasso. Monument to Rene Bonpain
Coudekerque Branche War Memorial	Coudekerque-Branche, Nord	This memorial can be found in the local Coudekerque Branche cemetery.
Saint-Pol-sur-Mer War Memorial	Saint-Pol-sur-Mer, Nord	In Ringot's composition a woman kneels before a pile of rubble and a soldier's helmet.
Bois Grenier War Memorial	Bois-Grenier, Nord	Two women grieve over the body of a dead soldier. One is the mother, stricken with grief and the second, a young woman, who tenderly kisses his forehead. Ringot's composition includes the Croix de Guerre. Bois Grenier is a small village 3.5 kilometres south of Armentières and the monument aux morts was inaugurated on 11 September 1927.
Leffrinckoucke War Memorial	Leffrinckoucke, Nord	Ringot was the sculptor of the original Leffrinckoucke War Memorial which showed a family grieving over a soldier's grave but this was destroyed in World War II when the Germans dynamited the church of Sainte-Catherine, judging it to be strategically dangerous. What is left of the memorial is kept in the local cemetery, hidden it seems behind a hedge.
Armentières War Memorial	Armentières, Nord	This war memorial takes the form of an obelisk in the Place du Général de Gaulle and was erected in 1920. On the sides of the obelisk Ringot depicts two soldiers, one of them dying, two grieving women, one a wife, the "Angel of Victory" and a family in mourning. Also included are the arms of Armentières, a palm leaf, and a funeral crown. The monument honours the 238 men of Armentières who lay down their lives in the Great War.
Don War Memorial	Don, Nord	The War Memorial, near the local church, depicts a family group of grandmother, mother and child at the grave of a soldier. On the grave are some thistles and the soldier's helmet.
La Bassée War Memorial	La Bassée, Nord	At the top of the memorial's column is the figure of Joan of Arc and at her feet is written "France". The memorial also has the coat of arms of La Bassée and the Croix de guerre. At the base of the column are two women and a soldier. The soldier and one of the women look up at Joan of Arc. It seems that this memorial was originally destined for Orchamps Vennes but they turned it down, possibly because of the inclusion of Joan of Arc. Certainly when the unveiling took place in La Bassée several ex-soldiers refused to attend saying that the inclusion of Joan of Arc was "inappropriate". The memorial is situated in the Place Jeanne d'Arc at the back of the local church. Monument aux morts at La Bassée
Jumièges War Memorial	Jumièges, Seine-Maritime	In Ringot's composition we have a soldier carrying the flag of France. It was inaugurated on 13 November 1921.

== Other works: Churches and architectural embellishments ==
Place	Location	Subject, notes and references
Notre-Dame-du-Fort Parish Church	Fort-Mardyck, Nord	Ringot carried out some sculptural work for the church's altar.
St Nicolas Parish Church	Zuydcoote, Nord	For this rue du Général-De-Gaulle church, Ringot completed sculptural work that was later destroyed along with the church during the Second World War. The church was rebuilt but Ringot's work lost.
Saint-Zéphirin Parish Church	Rosendaël, Nord	Saint-Zéphirin is another church where Ringot's work was lost due to war damage. The church needed to be rebuilt. Ringot had carved a statue of Saint Antoine.
St Leonard Church	Spycker, Nord	Ringot worked on a baptismal font for this church.
Chateau Coquelle	Dunkirk, Nord	Ringot executed sculptural work for the Chateau's interior.
Église Notre Dame des Affligés	Merville, Nord	Ringot's exterior sculpture on this church is a tympanum celebrating the local discovery of a statue of the Virgin Mary, which was the reason the church was built in this particular location.
Saint-Gohard Parish Church	Merville, Nord	Ringot carried out sculptural work for this church at Caudescure, near Merville.
Carvings on 51 avenue Gustave Lemaire in Malo-les-Bains	Malo-les-Bains, Nord	Ringot completed sculptural work beneath the main windows of this building, which was built between 1903 and 1910. Ringot's work includes depictions of "Day" and "Night" in the Art Nouveau style. He carved the faces of two young women, one of whom is awake whilst the other is sleeping. For the same building Ringot carved two tympani featuring a cockerel.
The Parish Church of St Vaast	La Bassée, Nord	The parish church of St Vaast was rebuilt after the 1914–1918 war and the furnishings were completed between 1930 and 1932. The sculptural work was done by Ringot.
Tympanum in Bergues	Bergues, Nord	Ringot carved a tympanum over the main window of the 58 Rue Carnot building, which was the office of a grain dealer. Ringot's composition was an allegory for the trade in cereals and the central figure was Mercury surrounded by country scenes: farms, windmills, etc.
The Parish Church of St Roch	Armentières, Nord	Ringot was responsible for some of the church furnishings.
Monument marking Rosendael's 50th Anniversary.	Rosendael, Nord	The monument celebrates Rosendael's two main activities: fishing and gardening.
Sculpture on 1 place de la Petite Chapelle	Dunkirk, Nord	Ringot carved a Madonna and child for an external corner of the building.

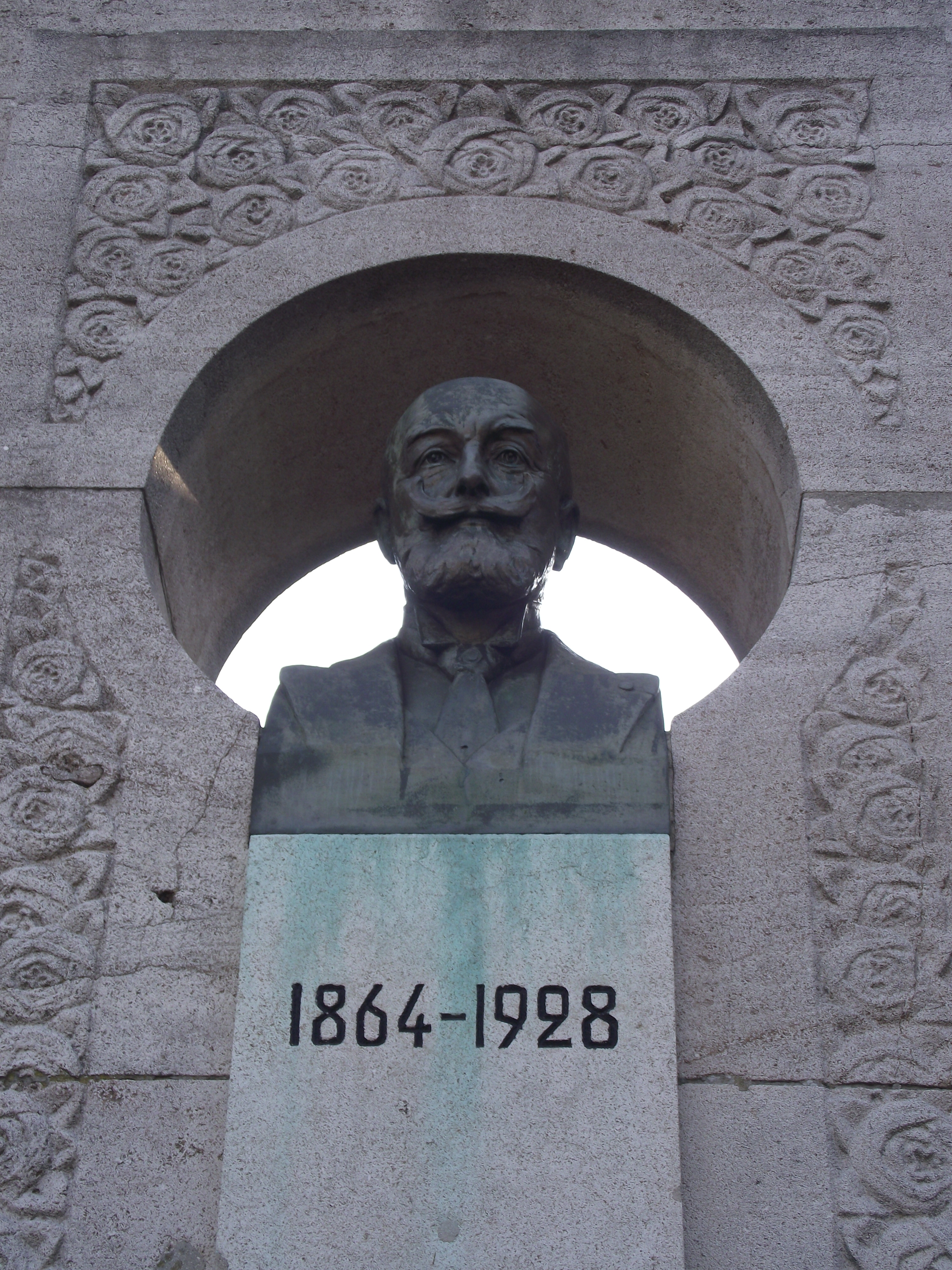
Bust of Felix Coquelle

== Churchyard headstones ==
Place	Location	Subject, notes and references
Family grave of Coops Busgers	Dunkirk, Nord	The headstone has a medallion featuring Mr.Coops-Busgers.
Family grave of the Lutzer-Allemes in the Art nouveau style	Dunkirk, Nord	Ringot carried out some ornate carvings on the headstone.
Grave of Chiroutre family	Dunkirk, Nord	Ringot carved a depiction of Christ on the Cross for this grave.
Grave of Charles Valentin	Dunkirk, Nord	Ringot sculpted Valentin's bust on the top of a pillar.
Grave of Paulette Kleinmann	Dunkirk, Nord	Ringot carved in bas-relief on the headstone a funeral urn with a garland of roses.
Grave of the family Verley-Châtillon	Dunkirk, Nord	Headstone has a bas-relief depiction of Paul Verley who was a former mayor of Dunkirk.
Grave of Paul Macau another former Dunkirk mayor.	Dunkirk, Nord	Ringot added a médaillon to the headstone, this depicting Paul Macau.

== Recommended reading ==
- "Un grand sculpteur de notre Flandre maritime : Maurice Ringot, 1880–1951" by Laurentine Moritz-Bart. Published in 1981 in Dunkirk by Amis du vieux Dunkerque.
