= Estaires =

Estaires Stegers
- Commune
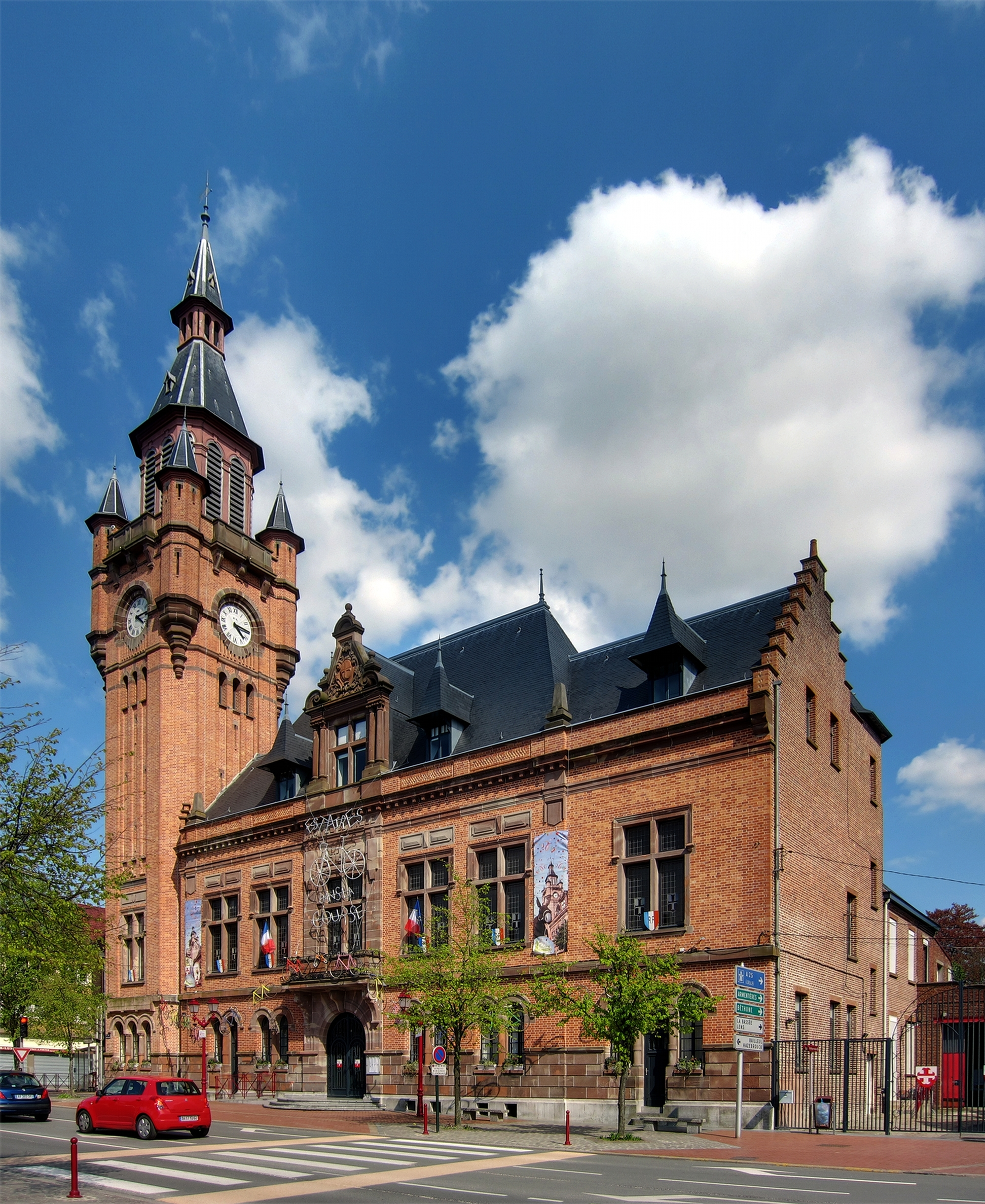
- The town hall in Estaires

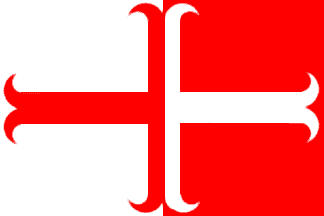
- Flag Coat of arms
- Location of Estaires
- Location within France Location within Hauts-de-France
- Coordinates: 50°38′40″N 2°43′25″E
- Country: France
- Region: Hauts-de-France
- Department: Nord
- Arrondissement: Dunkerque
- Canton: Hazebrouck
- Intercommunality: Flandre Lys

Government
  - Mayor (2020–2026): Bruno Ficheux
- Area^{1}: 12.82 km^{2} (4.95 sq mi)
- Elevation: 16 m (52 ft)
- Highest elevation: 19 m (62 ft)
- Lowest elevation: 12 m (39 ft)
- Population (2023): 6,525
  - Density: 509.0/km^{2} (1,318/sq mi)
- Demonym(s): Estairois, Estairoises
- Time zone: UTC+01:00 (CET)
  - Summer (DST): UTC+02:00 (CEST)
- INSEE/Postal code: 59212 /59940
- ^{1} French Land Register data, which excludes lakes, ponds, glaciers > 1 km^{2} (0.386 sq mi or 247 acres) and river estuaries.

Estaires (French pronunciation: [etɛʁ]; West Flemish: Stegers) is a commune in the Nord department of the Hauts-de-France region in northern France.

The town gives its name to a type of chicken bred in the area: the Estaires chicken.

== Geography ==
Estaires is located in French Flanders, in the Lys valley at an altitude of 16 m. The Meteren Becque flows into the Lys at this point. It stands 30 km west of Lille, 17 km from Hazebrouck and 14 km from Armentieres. It is twinned with Wielun in Poland.

== History ==
The town stands on the site of a Roman Gaul city called Minariacum which features in the Antonine Itinerary, in the area of the town now known as Pont d'Estaires. Its earlier name is probably Celtic, but the etymology is obscure. It was positioned strategically on the road linking Castellum Menapiorum (Cassel) to the capital of the Atrebates peoples, Nemetacum Atrebatum (Arras), at the narrowest crossing of the Lys.

Converted to Christianity in the ninth century by St Vaast, the city took the name of Stegers from the Old Dutch steger meaning a berth or mooring. It was part of the County of Flanders from its inception as was most of the Lys plain and was a lordship manor.

The Lys formed a language border; to the north they spoke Flemish and to the south Picard (Romance Flanders). The town's name is the romanised Estaires, but the Estairois spoke both. In the Middle Ages the town developed through textile production. However it also suffered from the many conflicts between the Flemish, French, English, and also the Burgundians, Austrians and Spaniards.

Flanders was strongly Catholic, but advent of Lutheran thought in the sixteenth century led to religious unrest. In 1566, the Geuzen Revolt broke out, affecting Estaires. Catholic iconography was destroyed by the Calvinists. In Estaires, on the day of Corpus Christi, the Geuzen mockingly processed with a donkey under a canopy in place of a priest. This episode remains part of the town's heritage and the Estairois are nicknamed Donkeys.

The town became French in 1769 following the exchange of several enclaves with the Netherlands. At that time it was a flourishing textile producer, as was Armentières.

The industrial base of the town was destroyed during the First World War. It was taken by the Germans in the spring of 1918 and was reconquered by the Allies towards the end of the war. Almost the entire town was destroyed by the German army during the Battle of the Lys (9 April 1918). In recognition, the town received the 1914-1918 Croix de Guerre.

With the subsequent economic crisis in the textile sector, the town never really recovered. From a peak of over 7,000 residents in the 1870s, the population plunged to under 4,000 in 1920. By 2023 it had recovered to 6,525.

== Population ==
Historical population
| Year | Pop. | ±% p.a. |
|---|---|---|
| 1968 | 5,003 | — |
| 1975 | 5,350 | +0.96% |
| 1982 | 5,317 | −0.09% |
| 1990 | 5,434 | +0.27% |
| 1999 | 5,691 | +0.51% |
| 2007 | 5,966 | +0.59% |
| 2012 | 5,935 | −0.10% |
| 2017 | 6,379 | +1.45% |
| 2023 | 6,525 | +0.38% |
Source: INSEE

== Heraldry ==
| Arms of Estaires | The arms of Estaires are blazoned : Per fess argent and gules, a cross moline counterchanged. |

== Principal buildings ==
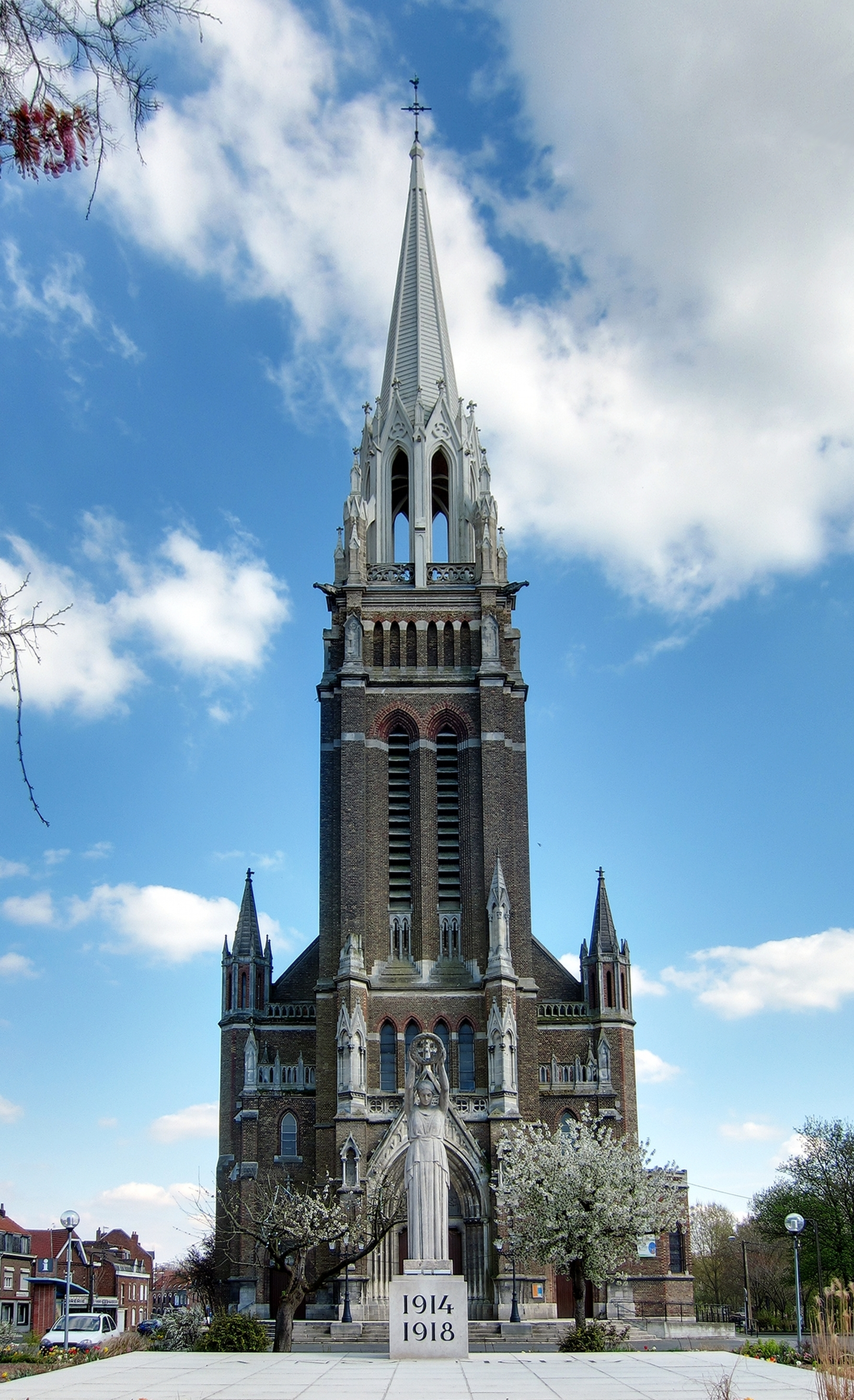
Church of St Vaast

There are virtually no buildings dating from before 1918; the town was completely destroyed by German bombing on 9 and 10 April 1918, then by the allies until October 1918.

The neo-Renaissance Flemish-style town hall was built between 1928 and 1930 by the architect Georges Dumas. It replaced a town hall that was built between 1600 and 1612 destroyed in the First World War. The belfry and the facade were renovated in 2007 and 2008.

The church of St Vaast was also built between 1927 and 1930 by Dumas on the location of a previous church dating from 1858 by Charles Leroy, a notable architect of the region. It is a Neo-Gothic Latin cross, 76m x 29m, surmounted by a 76m spire. The portal tympanums and the internal frieze were executed by the sculptor Robert Coin. It was much damaged again by bombing on 25 and 26 May 1940 and had to be renovated after the war. The spire was restored in 1988.

== See also ==
- Communes of the Nord department
